= 2018 United States gubernatorial elections =

- November 6, 2018

39 governorships 36 states; 3 territories
	Majority party	Minority party
Party	Republican	Democratic
Seats before	33	16
Seats after	27	23
Seat change	▼6	▲7
Popular vote	43,452,881	46,253,757
Percentage	48.28%	51.39%
Seats up	26	9
Seats won	20	16
	Third party
Party	Independent
Seats before	1
Seats after	0
Seat change	▼1
Popular vote	299,612
Percentage	0.33%
Seats up	1
Seats won	0
- Map of the results Democratic hold Democratic gain Republican hold Republican gain No election

United States gubernatorial elections were held on November 6, 2018, in 36 states and three territories. These elections formed part of the 2018 United States elections. Other coinciding elections were the 2018 United States Senate elections and the 2018 United States House of Representatives elections.

Many of the states holding gubernatorial elections have term limits which made some multi-term governors ineligible for re-election. Two Democratic governors were term-limited while six incumbent Democratic governors were eligible for re-election. Among Republican governors, twelve were term-limited while eleven could seek re-election. One independent governor was eligible for re-election.

Elections were held in 26 of the 33 states with Republican governors, nine of the 16 states with Democratic governors, one state (Alaska) with an independent governor, two territories (Guam and Northern Mariana Islands) with Republican governors, one territory (U.S. Virgin Islands) with an independent governor, and the District of Columbia with a Democratic mayor. Incumbent state governors running to be reelected included 14 Republicans, five Democrats, and one independent. Territorial incumbents running included one Republican and one independent. The incumbent Democratic mayor of Washington, D.C. also ran for re-election.

Democrats gained control of nine state and territorial governorships that had previously been held by Republicans and an independent. They picked up Republican-held open seats in the states of Kansas, Maine, Michigan, Nevada, and New Mexico, in addition to defeating Republican incumbents in Illinois and Wisconsin and not losing any seats of their own. Additionally, they won the Republican-controlled territory of Guam and the independent-controlled territory of the U.S. Virgin Islands. Republicans won the governorship of Alaska previously held by an independent. Democrats also won the total popular vote for the year's gubernatorial elections for the second year in a row.

As of 2026, this is the last time that Republicans won governorships in Arizona, Maryland, and Massachusetts.

Six women won election for the first time as Governor in 2018.

== Election predictions ==
Several sites and individuals publish predictions of competitive seats. These predictions look at factors such as the strength of the incumbent (if the incumbent is running for re-election), the strength of the candidates, and the partisan leanings of the state (reflected in part by the state's Cook Partisan Voting Index rating). The predictions assign ratings to each seat, with the rating indicating the predicted advantage that a party has in winning that seat. Most election predictors use "tossup" to indicate that neither party has an advantage, "lean" to indicate that one party has a slight advantage, "likely" or "favored" to indicate that one party has a significant but not insurmountable advantage and "safe" or "solid" to indicate that one party has a near-certain chance of victory. Some predictions also include a "tilt" rating that indicates that one party has an advantage that is not quite as strong as the "lean" rating would indicate (except Fox News, where "likely" is the highest rating given). Governors whose names are in parentheses are not contesting the election.

State	PVI	Incumbent	Last race	Cook October 26, 2018	IE November 1, 2018	Sabato November 5, 2018	RCP November 4, 2018	Daily Kos November 5, 2018	Fox News October 10, 2018 (Note: The Fox News Midterm Power Rankings uniquely does not contain a category for safe/solid races.)	Politico November 5, 2018	538 (Note: Reflects the classic version of the forecast model.) November 5, 2018	Winner
Alabama	R+14	Kay Ivey (R)	63.6% R	Safe R	Safe R	Safe R	Safe R	Safe R	Likely R ^	Safe R	Safe R	Ivey; 59.46% R
Alaska	R+9	Bill Walker (I)	48.1% I	Lean R (flip)	Tilt R (flip)	Lean R (flip)	Tossup	Lean R (flip)	Tossup	Lean R (flip)	Lean R (flip)	Dunleavy; 51.44% R (flip)
Arizona	R+5	Doug Ducey (R)	53.4% R	Likely R	Likely R	Likely R	Likely R	Safe R	Likely R ^	Likely R	Safe R	Ducey; 56.00% R
Arkansas	R+15	Asa Hutchinson (R)	55.4% R	Safe R	Safe R	Safe R	Safe R	Safe R	Likely R ^	Safe R	Safe R	Hutchinson (R); 65.33% R
California	D+12	Jerry Brown (D) (term-limited)	60.0% D	Safe D	Safe D	Safe D	Likely D	Safe D	Likely D ^	Safe D	Safe D	Newsom; 61.94% D
Colorado	D+1	John Hickenlooper (D) (term-limited)	48.4% D	Lean D	Lean D	Lean D	Lean D	Lean D	Lean D	Lean D	Likely D	Polis; 53.42% D
Connecticut	D+6	Dan Malloy (D) (retiring)	50.9% D	Tossup	Lean D	Lean D	Tossup	Lean D	Lean D	Lean D	Likely D	Lamont; 49.37% D
Florida	R+2	Rick Scott (R) (term-limited)	48.1% R	Tossup	Tilt D (flip)	Lean D (flip)	Tossup	Tossup	Tossup	Tossup	Lean D (flip)	DeSantis; 49.59% R
Georgia	R+5	Nathan Deal (R) (term-limited)	52.8% R	Tossup	Tilt R	Tossup	Tossup	Tossup	Tossup	Tossup	Lean R	Kemp; 50.22% R
Hawaii	D+18	David Ige (D)	49.0% D	Safe D	Safe D	Safe D	Safe D	Safe D	Likely D ^	Safe D	Safe D	Ige; 62.67% D
Idaho	R+19	Butch Otter (R) (retiring)	53.5% R	Safe R	Safe R	Safe R	Safe R	Safe R	Likely R ^	Safe R	Safe R	Little; 59.76% R
Illinois	D+7	Bruce Rauner (R)	50.3% R	Likely D (flip)	Likely D (flip)	Likely D (flip)	Likely D (flip)	Likely D (flip)	Likely D (flip)	Likely D (flip)	Likely D (flip)	Pritzker; 54.53% D (flip)
Iowa	R+3	Kim Reynolds (R)	59.0% R	Tossup	Tilt D (flip)	Lean D (flip)	Tossup	Tossup	Tossup	Tossup	Tossup	Reynolds; 50.26% R
Kansas	R+13	Jeff Colyer (R) (lost nomination)	49.8% R	Tossup	Tossup	Lean D (flip)	Tossup	Tossup	Tossup	Tossup	Tossup	Kelly; 48.01% D (flip)
Maine	D+3	Paul LePage (R) (term-limited)	48.2% R	Tossup	Tilt D (flip)	Lean D (flip)	Lean D (flip)	Tossup	Tossup	Tossup	Likely D (flip)	Mills; 50.89% D (flip)
Maryland	D+12	Larry Hogan (R)	51.0% R	Likely R	Likely R	Likely R	Likely R	Likely R	Likely R ^	Likely R	Safe R	Hogan; 55.35% R
Massachusetts	D+12	Charlie Baker (R)	48.5% R	Safe R	Safe R	Safe R	Safe R	Safe R	Likely R ^	Safe R	Safe R	Baker; 66.60% R
Michigan	D+1	Rick Snyder (R) (term-limited)	50.9% R	Lean D (flip)	Lean D (flip)	Likely D (flip)	Lean D (flip)	Likely D (flip)	Lean D (flip)	Likely D (flip)	Likely D (flip)	Whitmer; 53.31% D (flip)
Minnesota	D+1	Mark Dayton (D) (retiring)	50.1% D	Likely D	Likely D	Lean D	Lean D	Likely D	Lean D	Likely D	Likely D	Walz; 53.84% D
Nebraska	R+14	Pete Ricketts (R)	57.2% R	Safe R	Safe R	Safe R	Safe R	Safe R	Likely R ^	Safe R	Safe R	Ricketts; 59.00% R
Nevada	D+1	Brian Sandoval (R) (term-limited)	70.6% R	Tossup	Tilt D (flip)	Lean D (flip)	Tossup	Tossup	Tossup	Tossup	Tossup	Sisolak; 49.39% D (flip)
New Hampshire	EVEN	Chris Sununu (R)	48.8% R	Lean R	Lean R	Lean R	Tossup	Likely R	Lean R	Lean R	Likely R	Sununu; 52.78% R
New Mexico	D+3	Susana Martinez (R) (term-limited)	57.3% R	Lean D (flip)	Lean D (flip)	Lean D (flip)	Lean D (flip)	Lean D (flip)	Lean D (flip)	Likely D (flip)	Likely D (flip)	Grisham; 57.20% D (flip)
New York	D+12	Andrew Cuomo (D)	54.2% D	Safe D	Safe D	Safe D	Safe D	Safe D	Likely D ^	Safe D	Safe D	Cuomo; 59.62% D
Ohio	R+3	John Kasich (R) (term-limited)	63.8% R	Tossup	Tossup	Lean D (flip)	Tossup	Tossup	Tossup	Tossup	Tossup	DeWine; 50.39% R
Oklahoma	R+20	Mary Fallin (R) (term-limited)	55.8% R	Tossup	Lean R	Lean R	Lean R	Lean R	Likely R ^	Lean R	Likely R	Stitt; 54.33% R
Oregon	D+5	Kate Brown (D)	50.9% D	Tossup	Tilt D	Lean D	Tossup	Lean D	Lean D	Lean D	Likely D	Brown; 50.05% D
Pennsylvania	EVEN	Tom Wolf (D)	54.9% D	Likely D	Likely D	Safe D	Safe D	Safe D	Likely D ^	Likely D	Safe D	Wolf; 57.77% D
Rhode Island	D+10	Gina Raimondo (D)	40.7% D	Lean D	Lean D	Likely D	Likely D	Lean D	Likely D ^	Lean D	Safe D	Raimondo; 52.64% D
South Carolina	R+8	Henry McMaster (R)	55.9% R	Likely R	Safe R	Safe R	Safe R	Safe R	Likely R ^	Likely R	Safe R	McMaster; 53.96% R
South Dakota	R+14	Dennis Daugaard (R) (term-limited)	70.5% R	Tossup	Tilt R	Lean R	Tossup	Lean R	Likely R ^	Tossup	Lean R	Noem; 50.97% R
Tennessee	R+14	Bill Haslam (R) (term-limited)	70.3% R	Likely R	Safe R	Safe R	Likely R	Safe R	Likely R ^	Likely R	Safe R	Lee; 59.56% R
Texas	R+8	Greg Abbott (R)	59.3% R	Safe R	Safe R	Safe R	Safe R	Safe R	Likely R ^	Safe R	Safe R	Abbott; 55.81% R
Vermont	D+15	Phil Scott (R)	52.9% R	Safe R	Safe R	Safe R	Likely R	Likely R	Likely R ^	Lean R	Likely R	Scott; 55.19% R
Wisconsin	EVEN	Scott Walker (R)	52.3% R	Tossup	Tossup	Lean D (flip)	Tossup	Tossup	Lean D (flip)	Tossup	Tossup	Evers; 49.54% D (flip)
Wyoming	R+25	Matt Mead (R) (term-limited)	58.3% R	Safe R	Safe R	Safe R	Safe R	Safe R	Likely R ^	Safe R	Safe R	Gordon; 67.12% R

^ Highest rating given

== Race summary ==
=== States ===
State	Incumbent	Party	First elected	Result	Candidates
Alabama	Kay Ivey	Republican	2017 (Note: Ivey took office after her predecessor (Robert J. Bentley) resigned.)	Incumbent elected to full term.	▌ ✓ Kay Ivey (Republican) 59.5%; ▌Walt Maddox (Democratic) 40.4%
Alaska	Bill Walker	Independent	2014	Incumbent retired. New governor elected. Republican gain.	▌ ✓ Mike Dunleavy (Republican) 51.4%; ▌Mark Begich (Democratic) 44.4%; ▌Bill Walker (Independent) 2.0%; ▌William Toien (Libertarian) 1.9%
Arizona	Doug Ducey	Republican	2014	Incumbent re-elected.	▌ ✓ Doug Ducey (Republican) 56.0%; ▌David Garcia (Democratic) 41.8%; ▌Angel Torres (Green) 2.1%
Arkansas	Asa Hutchinson	Republican	2014	Incumbent re-elected.	▌ ✓ Asa Hutchinson (Republican) 65.3%; ▌Jared Henderson (Democratic) 31.8%; ▌Mark West (Libertarian) 2.9%
California	Jerry Brown	Democratic	1974; 1982 (retired); 2010	Incumbent term-limited. New governor elected. Democratic hold.	▌ ✓ Gavin Newsom (Democratic) 61.9%; ▌John H. Cox (Republican) 38.1%
Colorado	John Hickenlooper	Democratic	2010	Incumbent term-limited. New governor elected. Democratic hold.	▌ ✓ Jared Polis (Democratic) 53.4%; ▌Walker Stapleton (Republican) 42.8%; ▌Scott Helker (Libertarian) 2.7%; ▌Bill Hammons (Unity) 1.0%
Connecticut	Dannel Malloy	Democratic	2010	Incumbent retired. New governor elected. Democratic hold.	▌ ✓ Ned Lamont (Democratic) 49.4%; ▌Bob Stefanowski (Republican) 46.2%; ▌Oz Griebel (Independent) 3.9%
Florida	Rick Scott	Republican	2010	Incumbent term-limited. New governor elected. Republican hold.	▌ ✓ Ron DeSantis (Republican) 49.6%; ▌Andrew Gillum (Democratic) 49.2%
Georgia	Nathan Deal	Republican	2010	Incumbent term-limited. New governor elected. Republican hold.	▌ ✓ Brian Kemp (Republican) 50.2%; ▌Stacey Abrams (Democratic) 48.8%
Hawaii	David Ige	Democratic	2014	Incumbent re-elected.	▌ ✓ David Ige (Democratic) 62.7%; ▌Andria Tupola (Republican) 33.7%; ▌Jim Brewer (Green) 2.6%; ▌Terrence Teruya (Nonpartisan) 1.0%
Idaho	Butch Otter	Republican	2006	Incumbent retired. New governor elected. Republican hold.	▌ ✓ Brad Little (Republican) 59.8%; ▌Paulette Jordan (Democratic) 38.2%; ▌Bev Boeck (Libertarian) 1.1%; ▌Walter L. Bayes (Constitution) 1.0%
Illinois	Bruce Rauner	Republican	2014	Incumbent lost re-election. New governor elected. Democratic gain.	▌ ✓ J. B. Pritzker (Democratic) 54.5%; ▌Bruce Rauner (Republican) 38.8%; ▌Sam McCann (Conservative) 4.2%; ▌Kash Jackson (Libertarian) 2.4%
Iowa	Kim Reynolds	Republican	2017 (Note: Reynolds took office after her predecessor (Terry Branstad) resigned.)	Incumbent elected to full term.	▌ ✓ Kim Reynolds (Republican) 50.3%; ▌Fred Hubbell (Democratic) 47.5%; ▌Jake Porter (Libertarian) 1.6%
Kansas	Jeff Colyer	Republican	2018 (Note: Colyer took office after his predecessor (Sam Brownback) was term-limited but resigned.)	Incumbent lost nomination to full term. New governor elected. Democratic gain.	▌ ✓ Laura Kelly (Democratic) 48.0%; ▌Kris Kobach (Republican) 43.0%; ▌Greg Orman (Independent) 6.5%; ▌Jeff Caldwell (Libertarian) 1.9%
Maine	Paul LePage	Republican	2010	Incumbent term-limited. New governor elected. Democratic gain.	▌ ✓ Janet Mills (Democratic) 50.9%; ▌Shawn Moody (Republican) 43.2%; ▌Terry Hayes (Independent) 5.9%
Maryland	Larry Hogan	Republican	2014	Incumbent re-elected.	▌ ✓ Larry Hogan (Republican) 55.3%; ▌Ben Jealous (Democratic) 43.5%
Massachusetts	Charlie Baker	Republican	2014	Incumbent re-elected.	▌ ✓ Charlie Baker (Republican) 66.6%; ▌Jay Gonzalez (Democratic) 33.1%
Michigan	Rick Snyder	Republican	2010	Incumbent term-limited. New governor elected. Democratic gain.	▌ ✓ Gretchen Whitmer (Democratic) 53.3%; ▌Bill Schuette (Republican) 43.7%; ▌Bill Gelineau (Libertarian) 1.3%
Minnesota	Mark Dayton	DFL	2010	Incumbent retired. New governor elected. Democratic–Farmer–Labor hold.	▌ ✓ Tim Walz (DFL) 53.8%; ▌Jeff Johnson (Republican) 42.4%; ▌Chris Wright (GLC) 2.6%; ▌Josh Welter (Libertarian) 1.0%
Nebraska	Pete Ricketts	Republican	2014	Incumbent re-elected.	▌ ✓ Pete Ricketts (Republican) 59.0%; ▌Bob Krist (Democratic) 41.0%
Nevada	Brian Sandoval	Republican	2010	Incumbent term-limited. New governor elected. Democratic gain.	▌ ✓ Steve Sisolak (Democratic) 49.4%; ▌Adam Laxalt (Republican) 45.3%; ▌None of These Candidates 1.9%; ▌Ryan C. Bundy (Independent) 1.4%; ▌Russell Best (Independent American) 1.0%
New Hampshire	Chris Sununu	Republican	2016	Incumbent re-elected.	▌ ✓ Chris Sununu (Republican) 52.8%; ▌Molly Kelly (Democratic) 45.7%; ▌Jilletta Jarvis (Libertarian) 1.4%
New Mexico	Susana Martinez	Republican	2010	Incumbent term-limited. New governor elected. Democratic gain.	▌ ✓ Michelle Lujan Grisham (Democratic) 57.2%; ▌Steve Pearce (Republican) 42.8%
New York	Andrew Cuomo	Democratic	2010	Incumbent re-elected.	▌ ✓ Andrew Cuomo (Democratic) 59.6%; ▌Marc Molinaro (Republican) 36.2%; ▌Howie Hawkins (Green) 1.7%; ▌Larry Sharpe (Libertarian) 1.6%
Ohio	John Kasich	Republican	2010	Incumbent term-limited. New governor elected. Republican hold.	▌ ✓ Mike DeWine (Republican) 50.4%; ▌Richard Cordray (Democratic) 46.7%; ▌Travis Irvine (Libertarian) 1.8%; ▌Constance Gadell-Newton (Green) 1.1%
Oklahoma	Mary Fallin	Republican	2010	Incumbent term-limited. New governor elected. Republican hold.	▌ ✓ Kevin Stitt (Republican) 54.3%; ▌Drew Edmondson (Democratic) 42.2%; ▌Chris Powell (Libertarian) 3.4%
Oregon	Kate Brown	Democratic	2015 (Note: Brown took office after her predecessor (John Kitzhaber) resigned. She was subsequently elected in the 2016 Oregon gubernatorial special election.)	Incumbent re-elected.	▌ ✓ Kate Brown (Democratic) 50.0%; ▌Knute Buehler (Republican) 43.6%; ▌Patrick Starnes (Independent) 2.9%; ▌Nick Chen (Libertarian) 1.5%; ▌Aaron Auer (Constitution) 1.1%
Pennsylvania	Tom Wolf	Democratic	2014	Incumbent re-elected.	▌ ✓ Tom Wolf (Democratic) 57.8%; ▌Scott Wagner (Republican) 40.7%; ▌Ken Krawchuk (Libertarian) 1.0%
Rhode Island	Gina Raimondo	Democratic	2014	Incumbent re-elected.	▌ ✓ Gina Raimondo (Democratic) 52.6%; ▌Allan Fung (Republican) 37.2%; ▌Joe Trillo (Independent) 4.4%; ▌Bill Gilbert (Moderate) 2.7%; ▌Luis-Daniel Munoz (Independent) 1.6%; ▌Anne Armstrong (Compassion) 1.1%
South Carolina	Henry McMaster	Republican	2017 (Note: McMaster took office after his predecessor (Nikki Haley) resigned.)	Incumbent elected to full term.	▌ ✓ Henry McMaster (Republican) 54.0%; ▌James E. Smith Jr. (Democratic) 45.9%
South Dakota	Dennis Daugaard	Republican	2010	Incumbent term-limited. New governor elected. Republican hold.	▌ ✓ Kristi Noem (Republican) 51.0%; ▌Billie Sutton (Democratic) 47.6%; ▌Kurt Evans (Libertarian) 1.4%
Tennessee	Bill Haslam	Republican	2010	Incumbent term-limited. New governor elected. Republican hold.	▌ ✓ Bill Lee (Republican) 59.6%; ▌Karl Dean (Democratic) 38.5%
Texas	Greg Abbott	Republican	2014	Incumbent re-elected.	▌ ✓ Greg Abbott (Republican) 55.8%; ▌Lupe Valdez (Democratic) 42.5%; ▌Mark Tippetts (Libertarian) 1.7%
Vermont	Phil Scott	Republican	2016	Incumbent re-elected.	▌ ✓ Phil Scott (Republican) 55.2%; ▌Christine Hallquist (Democratic) 40.2%; ▌Trevor Barlow (Independent) 1.2%
Wisconsin	Scott Walker	Republican	2010	Incumbent lost re-election. New governor elected. Democratic gain.	▌ ✓ Tony Evers (Democratic) 49.5%; ▌Scott Walker (Republican) 48.4%
Wyoming	Matt Mead	Republican	2010	Incumbent term-limited. New governor elected. Republican hold.	▌ ✓ Mark Gordon (Republican) 67.1%; ▌Mary Throne (Democratic) 27.5%; ▌Rex Rammell (Constitution) 3.3%; ▌Lawrence Struempf (Libertarian) 1.5%

=== Territories and federal district ===
Territory	Incumbent	Party	First elected	Result	Candidates
District of Columbia	Muriel Bowser	Democratic	2014	Incumbent re-elected.	▌ ✓ Muriel Bowser (Democratic) 76.4%; ▌Ann Wilcox (Statehood Green) 9.3%; ▌Dustin Canter (Independent) 6.9%; ▌Martin Moulton (Libertarian) 3.4%
Guam	Eddie Baza Calvo	Republican	2010	Incumbent term-limited. New governor elected. Democratic gain.	▌ ✓ Lou Leon Guerrero (Democratic) 50.8%; ▌Ray Tenorio (Republican) 26.4%; ▌Frank Aguon (Democratic/write-in) 22.8%
Northern Mariana Islands	Ralph Torres	Republican	2015 (Note: Torres took office after his predecessor (Eloy Inos) died.)	Incumbent elected to full term.	▌ ✓ Ralph Torres (Republican) 62.2%; ▌Juan Babauta (Independent) 37.8%
U.S. Virgin Islands	Kenneth Mapp	Independent	2014	Incumbent lost re-election. New governor elected. Democratic gain.	▌ ✓ Albert Bryan (Democratic) 54.5%; ▌Kenneth Mapp (Independent) 45.1%

== Closest races ==
States where the margin of victory was under 1%:

1. Florida, 0.4%

States where the margin of victory was under 5%:

1. Wisconsin, 1.1%
2. Georgia, 1.4%
3. Iowa, 2.8%
4. Connecticut, 3.2%
5. South Dakota, 3.4%
6. Ohio, 3.7%
7. Nevada, 4.1%

States where the margin of victory was under 10%:

1. Kansas, 5.0%
2. Oregon, 6.4%
3. Alaska, 7.0%
4. New Hampshire, 7.0%
5. Maine, 7.7%
6. South Carolina, 8.1%
7. U.S. Virgin Islands, 9.3%
8. Michigan, 9.5%

Red denotes states won by Republicans. Blue denotes states won by Democrats.

== Alabama ==
2018 Alabama gubernatorial election
- November 6, 2018
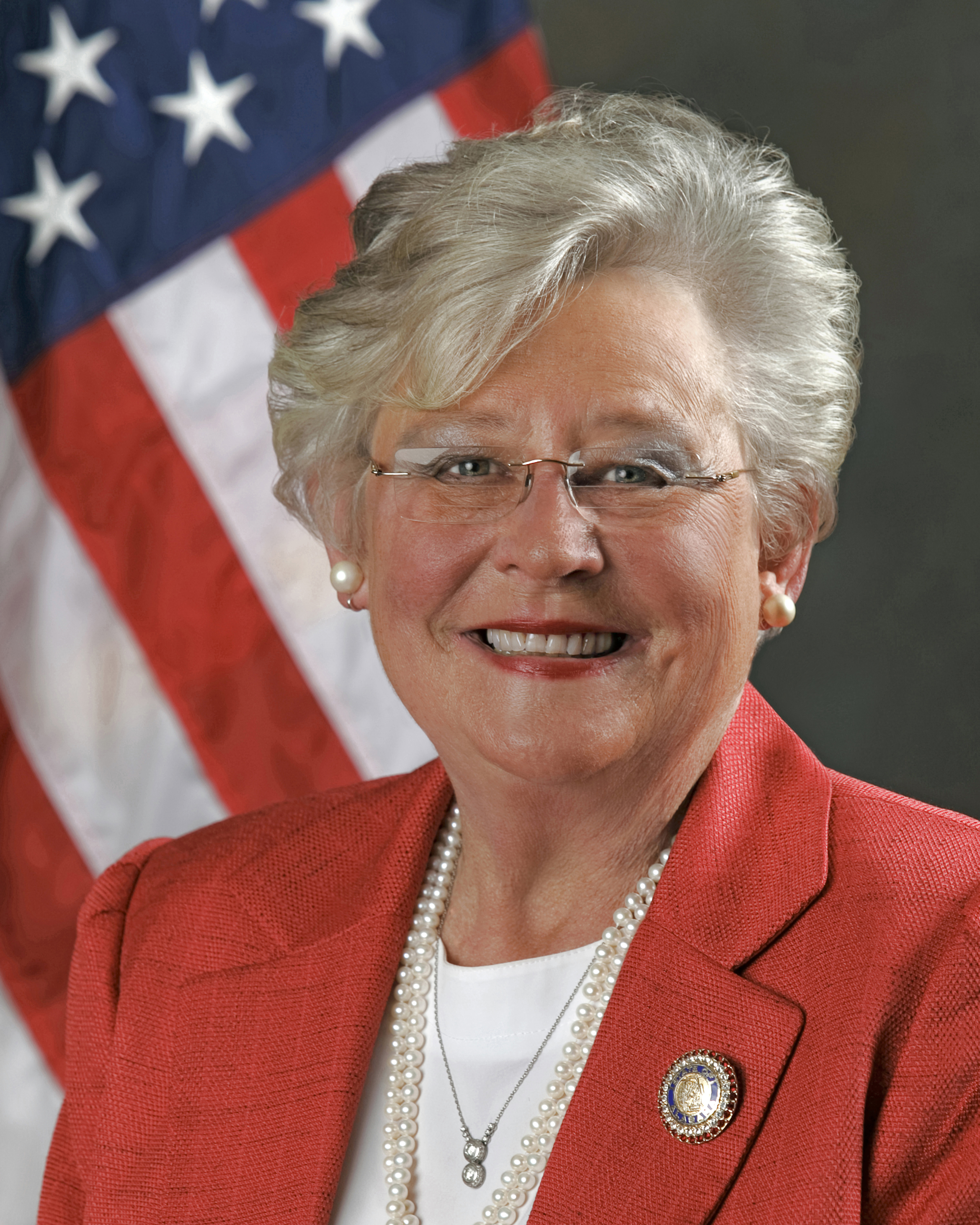

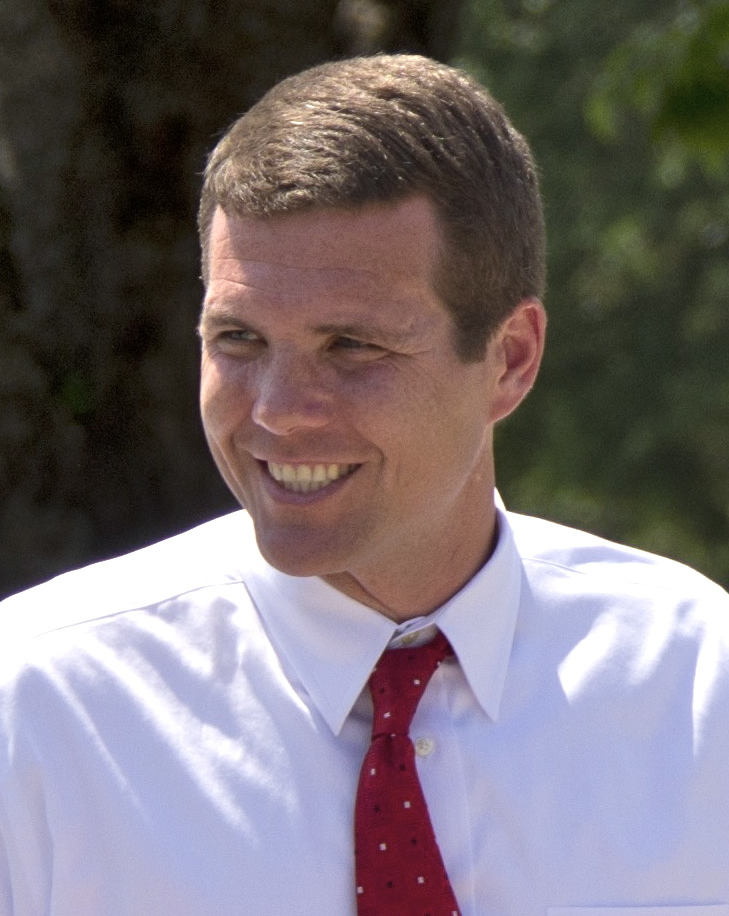
Nominee	Kay Ivey	Walt Maddox
Party	Republican	Democratic
Popular vote	1,022,457	694,495
Percentage	59.5%	40.4%
- County results Ivey: 50–60% 60–70% 70–80% 80–90% Maddox: 40–50% 50–60% 60–70% 70–80% 80–90%
Governor before election
Kay Ivey
Republican
Elected Governor
Kay Ivey
Republican

Incumbent Kay Ivey took office upon Robert Bentley's resignation in April 2017.

Ivey won election to a full term.

Alabama Republican primary
Party	Candidate	Votes	%
Republican	Kay Ivey (incumbent)	330,743	56.10
Republican	Tommy Battle	146,887	24.92
Republican	Scott Dawson	79,302	13.45
Republican	Bill Hightower	29,275	4.97
Republican	Michael McAllister	3,326	0.56
Total votes		589,533	100.00

Alabama Democratic primary
Party	Candidate	Votes	%
Democratic	Walt Maddox	154,559	54.60
Democratic	Sue Bell Cobb	82,043	28.98
Democratic	James Fields	22,635	8.00
Democratic	Anthony White	9,677	3.42
Democratic	Doug Smith	9,244	3.27
Democratic	Christopher Countryman	4,923	1.74
Total votes		283,081	100.00

Alabama general election
Party	Candidate	Votes	%	±%
Republican	Kay Ivey (incumbent)	1,022,457	59.46%	–4.10
Democratic	Walt Maddox	694,495	40.39%	+4.15
Write-in		2,637	0.15%	–0.05
Total votes		1,719,589	100.00%	
Republican hold				

== Alaska ==
2018 Alaska gubernatorial election
- November 6, 2018
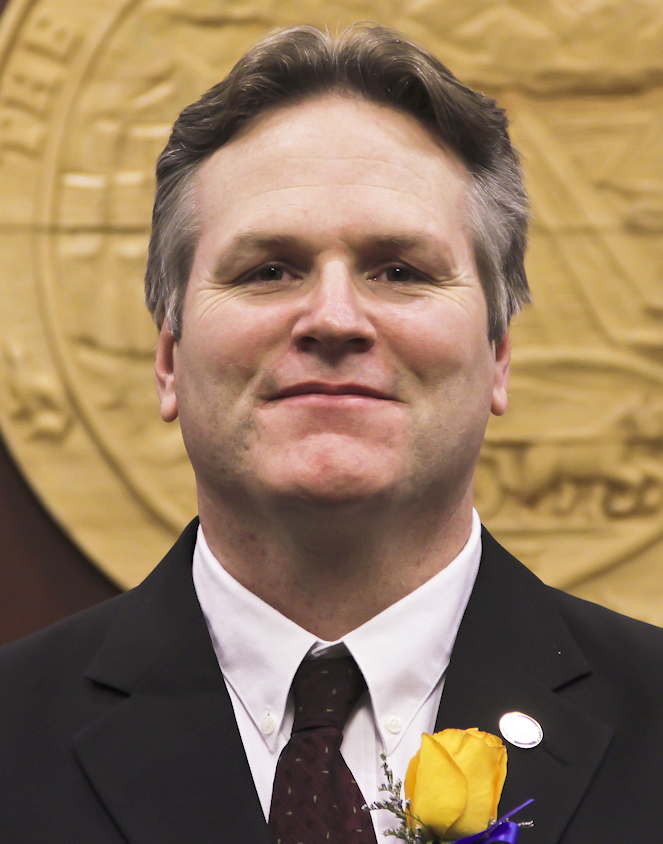

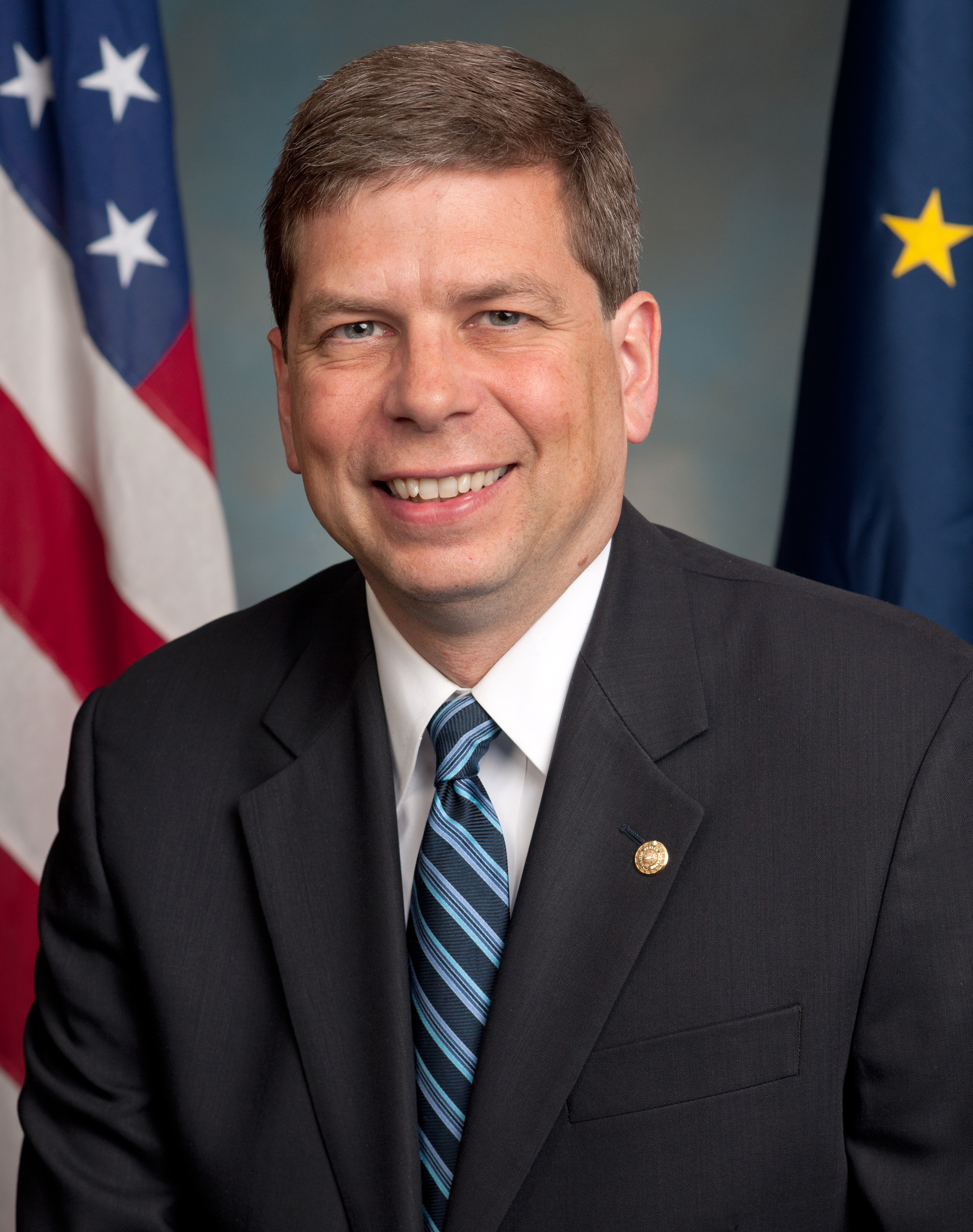
Nominee	Mike Dunleavy	Mark Begich
Party	Republican	Democratic
Running mate	Kevin Meyer	Debra Call
Popular vote	145,631	125,739
Percentage	51.4%	44.4%
- State house district results Dunleavy: 40–50% 50–60% 60–70% 70–80% Begich: 40–50% 50–60% 60–70%
Governor before election
Bill Walker
Independent
Elected Governor
Mike Dunleavy
Republican

One-term incumbent Bill Walker ran for re-election as an independent but dropped out of the race on October 19 to endorse Mark Begich (several days after Lieutenant Governor Byron Mallott resigned and several weeks before election day).

Former Alaska Senate member Mike Dunleavy won the Republican nomination.

Former U.S. Senator Mark Begich ran uncontested for the Democratic nomination.

Billy Tolein ran for governor on the Libertarian party ticket.

Dunleavy won the election.

Alaska Democratic-Libertarian-Independence primary
Party	Candidate	Votes	%
Democratic	Mark Begich	33,451	85.24
Libertarian	William Toien	5,790	14.75
Total votes		39,241	100.00

Alaska Republican primary
Party	Candidate	Votes	%
Republican	Mike Dunleavy	43,802	61.52
Republican	Mead Treadwell	22,780	32.00
Republican	Michael Sheldon	1,640	2.30
Republican	Merica Hlatu	1,064	1.49
Republican	Thomas Gordon	884	1.24
Republican	Gerald Heikes	499	0.70
Republican	Darin Colbry	416	0.58
Total votes		71,195	100.00

Alaska general election
Party	Candidate	Votes	%	±%
Republican	Mike Dunleavy	145,631	51.44%	+5.56
Democratic	Mark Begich	125,739	44.41%	N/A
Independent	Bill Walker (incumbent, withdrawn)	5,757	2.03%	–46.07
Libertarian	William Toien	5,402	1.91%	–1.30
Write-in		605	0.21%	–0.11
Total votes		283,134	100.00%	
Republican gain from Independent				

== Arizona ==
2018 Arizona gubernatorial election
- November 6, 2018
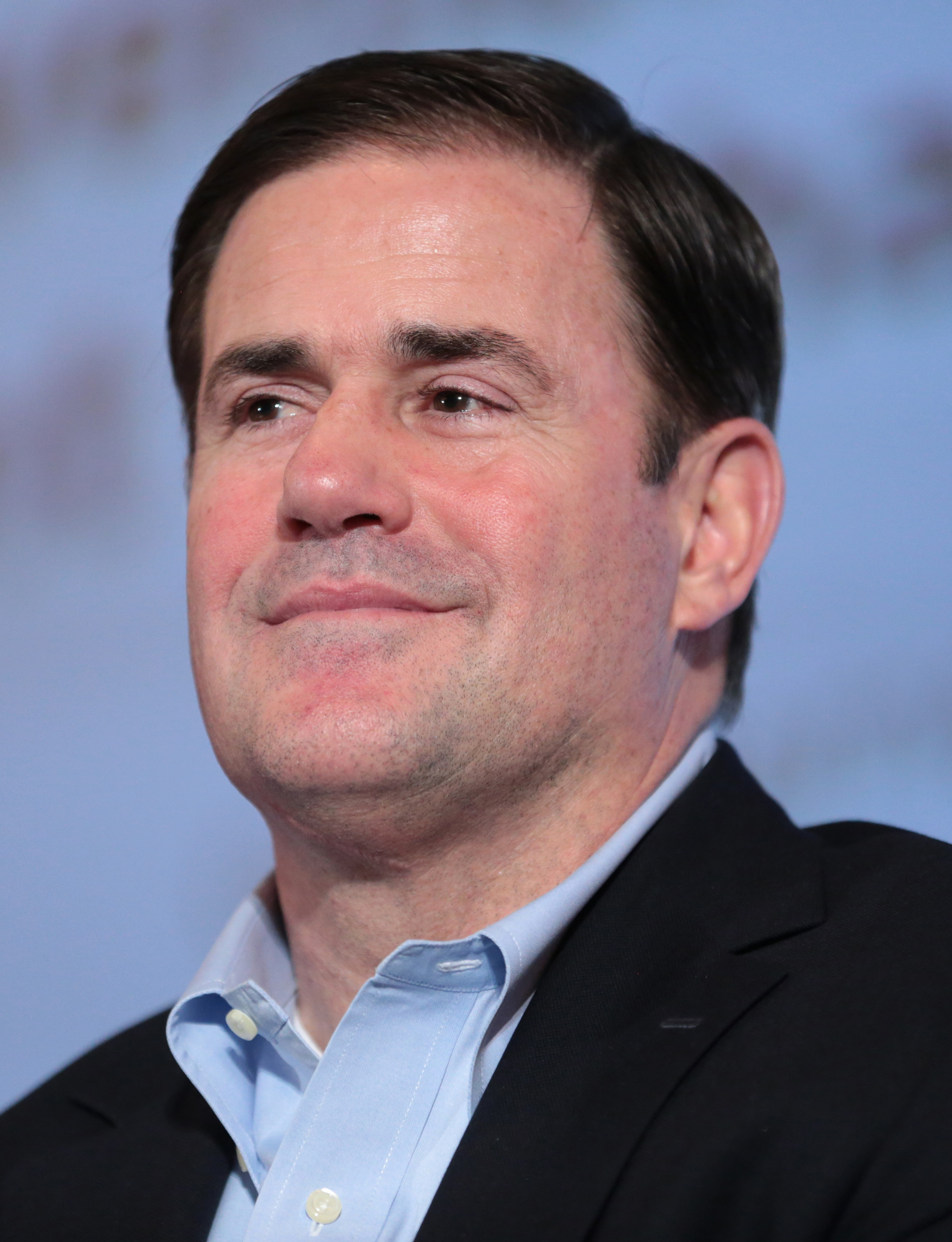

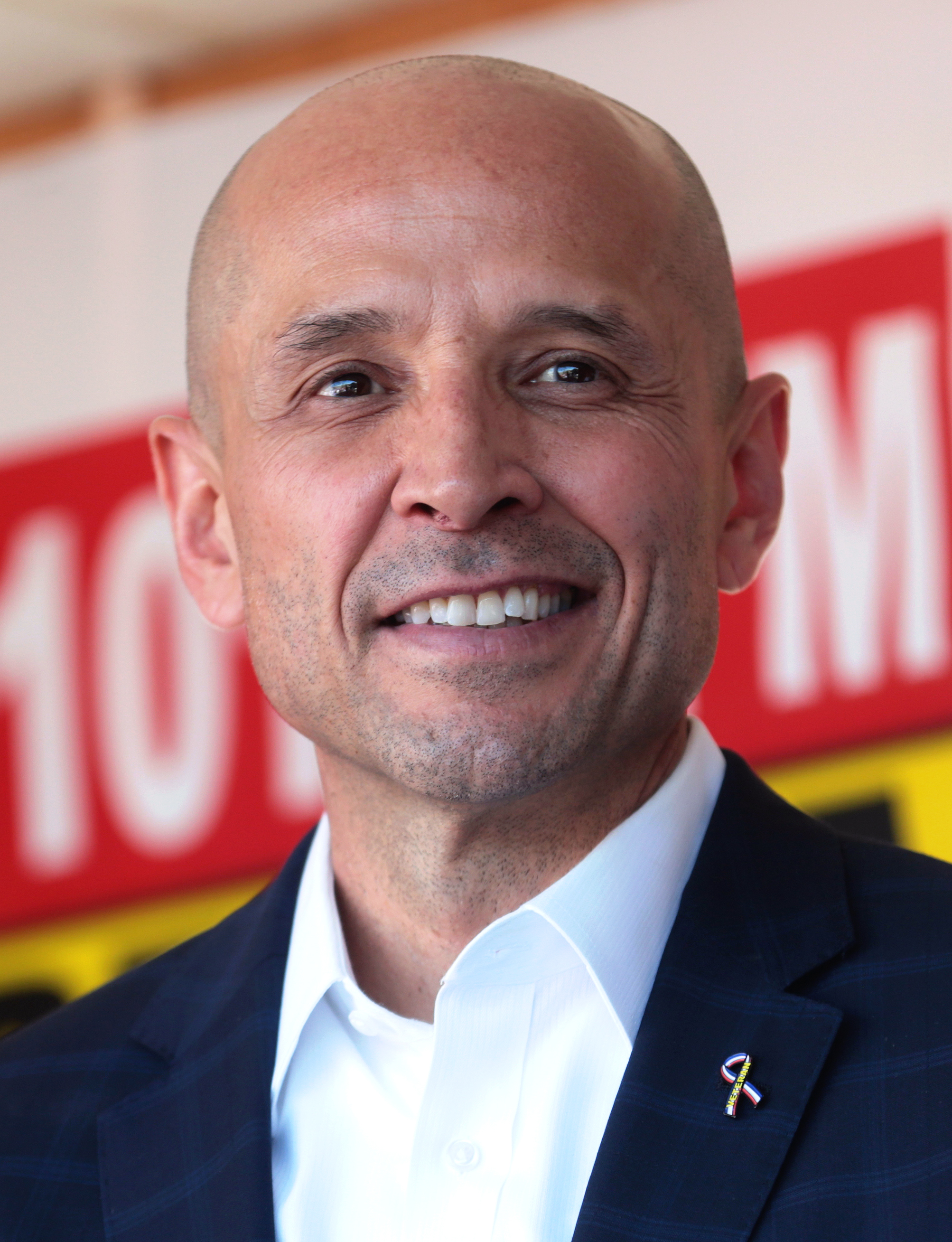
Nominee	Doug Ducey	David Garcia
Party	Republican	Democratic
Popular vote	1,330,863	994,341
Percentage	56.0%	41.8%
- County results Ducey: 50–60% 60–70% 70–80% Garcia: 50–60% 60–70%
Governor before election
Doug Ducey
Republican
Elected Governor
Doug Ducey
Republican

One-term incumbent Doug Ducey sought re-election.

Professor David Garcia won the Democratic gubernatorial nomination.

Libertarian candidate for president in 2016 Kevin McCormick declared his candidacy.

Ducey won re-election.

Arizona Republican primary
Party	Candidate	Votes	%
Republican	Doug Ducey (incumbent)	463,672	70.73
Republican	Ken Bennett	191,775	29.25
Write-in		91	0.01
Total votes		655,538	100.00

Arizona Democratic primary
Party	Candidate	Votes	%
Democratic	David Garcia	255,555	50.56
Democratic	Steve Farley	163,072	32.26
Democratic	Kelly Fryer	86,810	17.17
Write-in		44	0.01
Total votes		505,481	100.00

Arizona general election
Party	Candidate	Votes	%	±%
Republican	Doug Ducey (incumbent)	1,330,863	56.00%	+2.56
Democratic	David Garcia	994,341	41.84%	+0.22
Green	Angel Torres	50,962	2.14%	N/A
Write-in		275	0.01%	–0.10
Total votes		2,376,441	100.00%	
Republican hold				

== Arkansas ==
2018 Arkansas gubernatorial election
- November 6, 2018
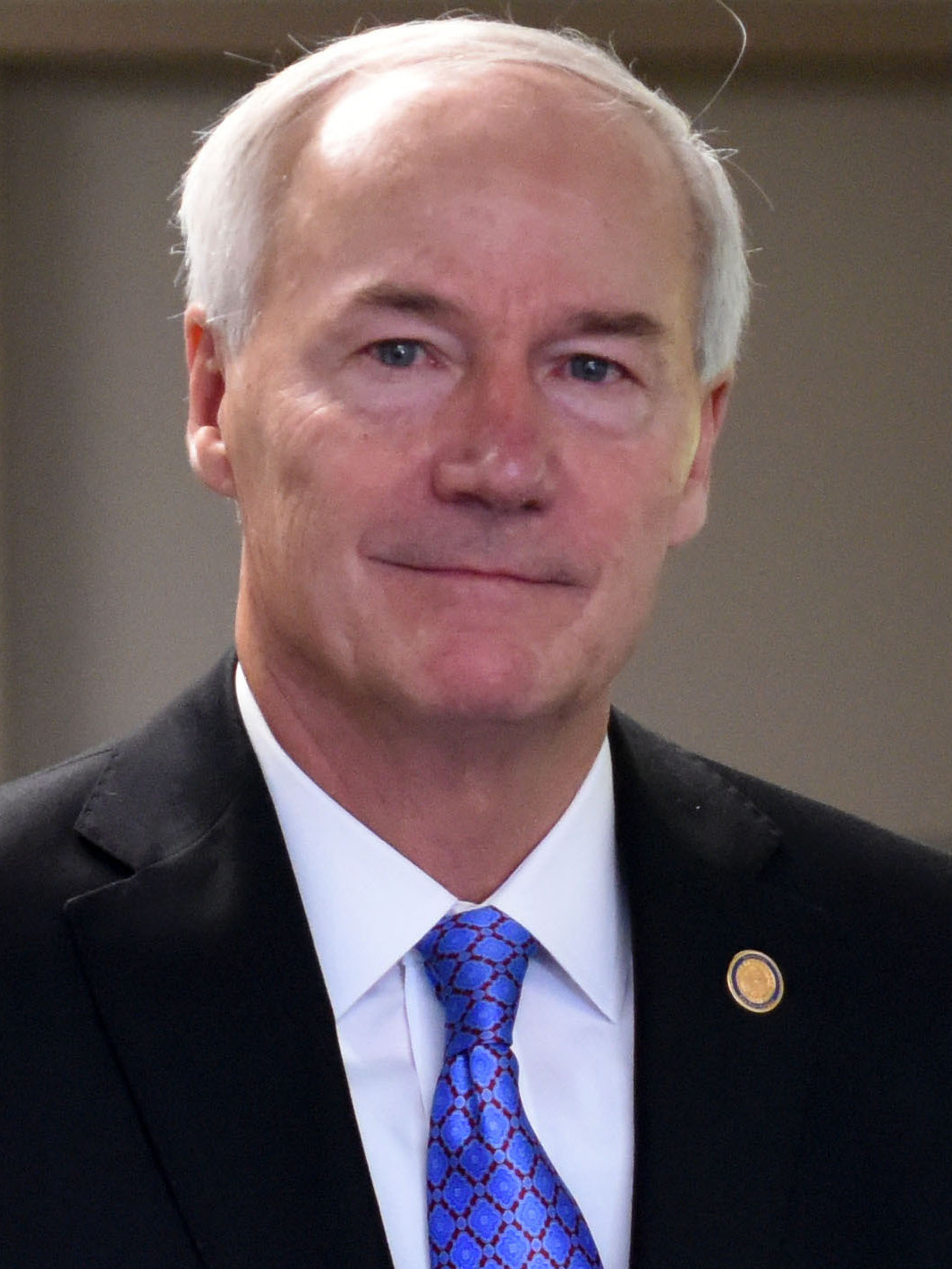

Nominee	Asa Hutchinson	Jared Henderson
Party	Republican	Democratic
Popular vote	582,406	283,218
Percentage	65.3%	31.8%
- County results Hutchinson: 50–60% 60–70% 70–80% 80–90% Henderson: 40-50% 50–60%
Governor before election
Asa Hutchinson
Republican
Elected Governor
Asa Hutchinson
Republican

One-term incumbent Asa Hutchinson ran for re-election.

Jared Henderson, a former state executive director for Teach For America, won the Democratic nomination.

Libertarian Mark West sought his party's nomination.

Hutchinson won re-election.

Arkansas Republican primary
Party	Candidate	Votes	%
Republican	Asa Hutchinson (incumbent)	145,251	69.75
Republican	Jan Morgan	63,009	30.25
Total votes		208,260	100.00

Arkansas Democratic primary
Party	Candidate	Votes	%
Democratic	Jared Henderson	68,340	63.44
Democratic	Leticia Sanders	39,382	36.56
Total votes		107,722	100.00

Arkansas general election
Party	Candidate	Votes	%	±%
Republican	Asa Hutchinson (incumbent)	582,406	65.33%	+9.89
Democratic	Jared Henderson	283,218	31.77%	–9.72
Libertarian	Mark West	25,885	2.90%	+0.98
Total votes		891,509	100.00%	
Republican hold				

== California ==
2018 California gubernatorial election
- November 6, 2018
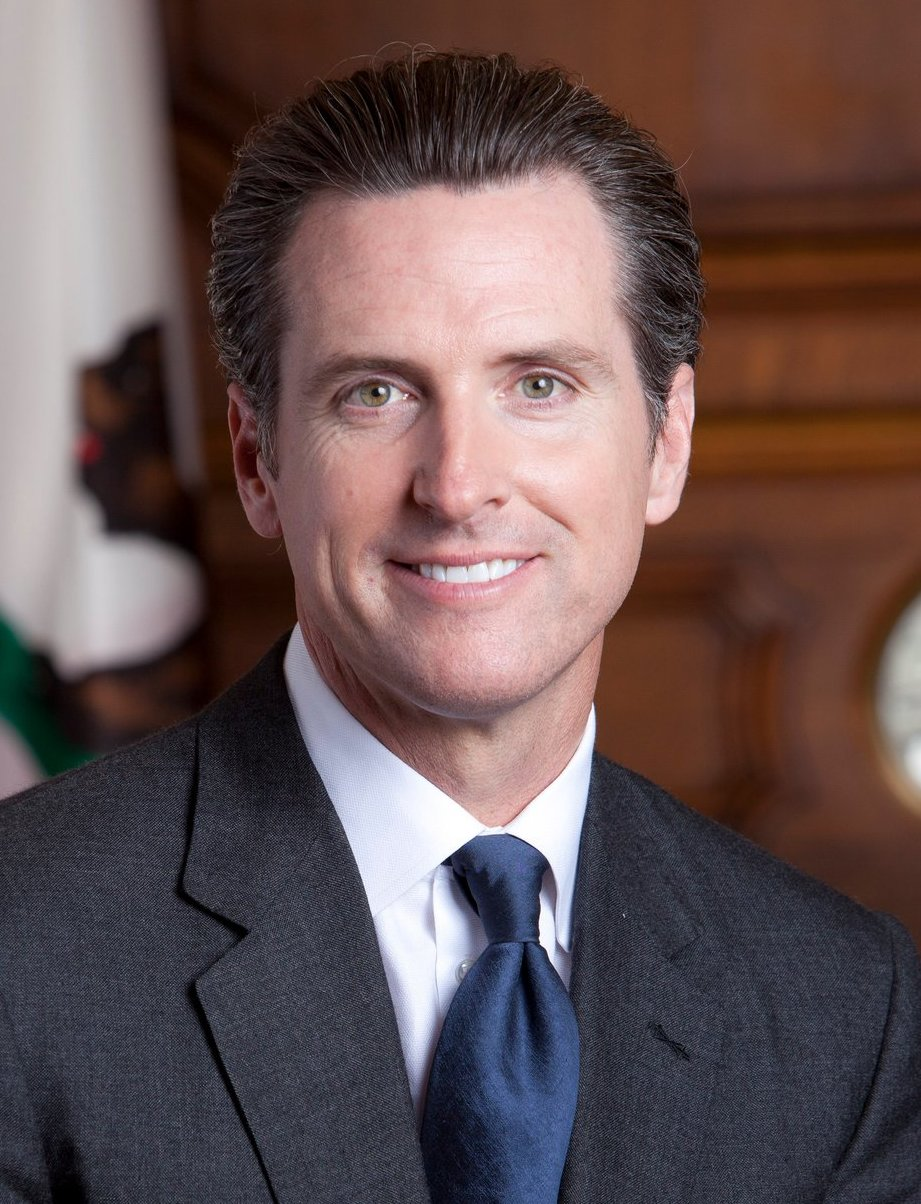

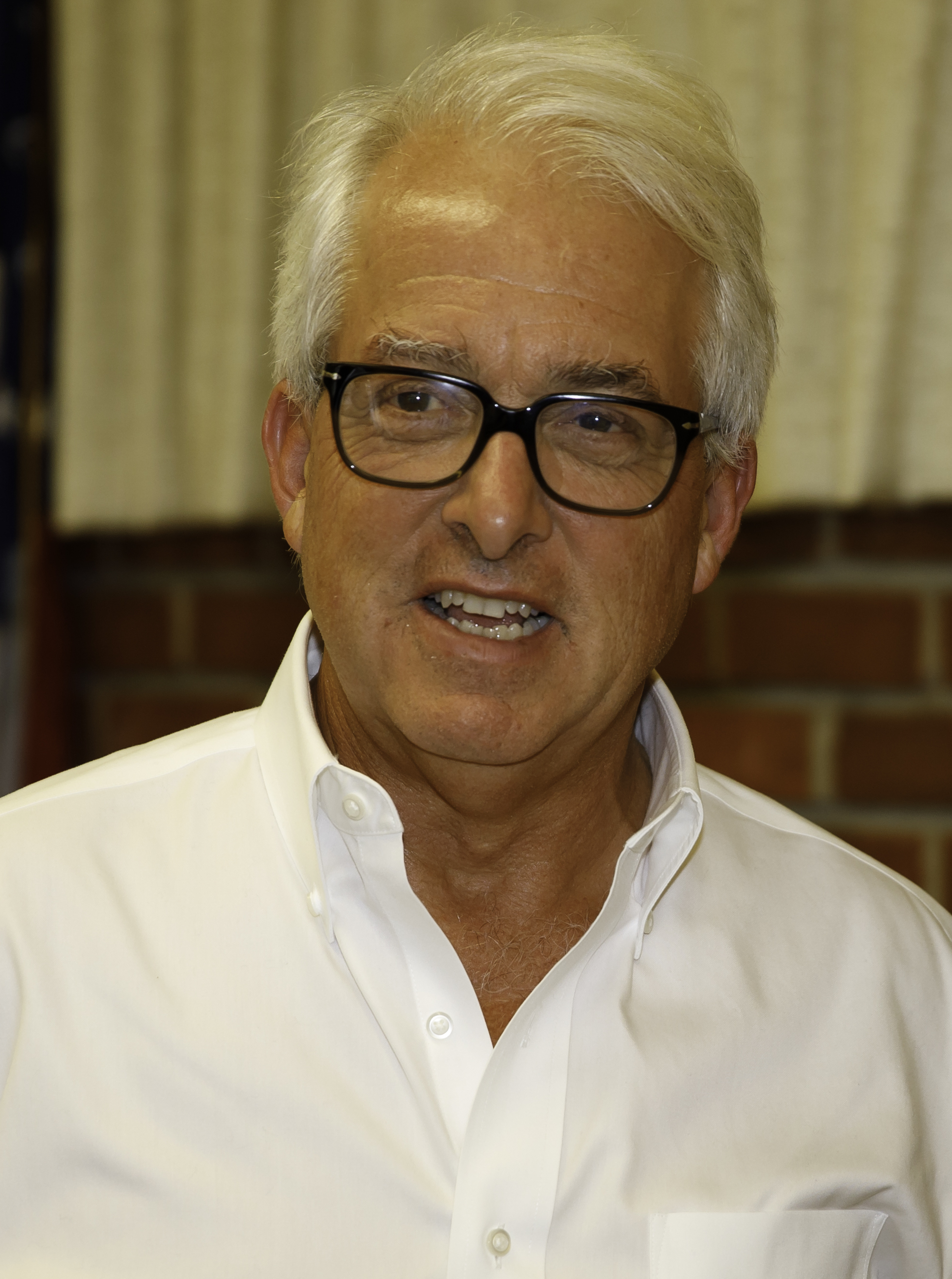
Nominee	Gavin Newsom	John Cox
Party	Democratic	Republican
Popular vote	7,721,410	4,742,825
Percentage	61.9%	38.1%
- County results Newsom: 50–60% 60–70% 70–80% 80–90% Cox: 50–60% 60–70% 70–80%
Governor before election
Jerry Brown
Democratic
Elected Governor
Gavin Newsom
Democratic

Two-term consecutive, four-term non-consecutive Governor Jerry Brown was term-limited, as California governors are limited to lifetime service of two terms in office. Brown previously served as governor from 1975 to 1983; California law affects only terms served after 1990.

The Democratic nominee was Lieutenant Governor Gavin Newsom.

The Republican nominee was businessman John H. Cox.

Libertarian candidates included transhumanist activist Zoltan Istvan.

Newsom won the election in a landslide, breaking the record for the largest number of votes received in a gubernatorial election.

California blanket primary
Party	Candidate	Votes	%
Democratic	Gavin Newsom	2,343,792	34.15
Republican	John H. Cox	1,766,488	25.74
Democratic	Antonio Villaraigosa	926,394	13.50
Republican	Travis Allen	658,798	9.60
Democratic	John Chiang	655,920	9.56
Democratic	Delaine Eastin	234,869	3.42
Democratic	Amanda Renteria	93,446	1.36
Republican	Robert C. Newman II	44,674	0.65
Democratic	Michael Shellenberger	31,692	0.46
Republican	Peter Y. Liu	27,336	0.40
Republican	Yvonne Girard	21,840	0.32
Peace and Freedom	Gloria La Riva	19,075	0.28
Democratic	J. Bribiesca	18,586	0.27
Green	Josh Jones	16,131	0.24
Libertarian	Zoltan Istvan	14,462	0.21
Democratic	Albert C. Mezzetti	12,026	0.18
Libertarian	Nickolas Wildstar	11,566	0.17
Democratic	Robert D. Griffis	11,103	0.16
Democratic	Akinyemi Agbede	9,380	0.14
Democratic	Thomas J. Cares	8,937	0.13
Green	Christopher N. Carlson	7,302	0.11
Democratic	Klement Tinaj	5,368	0.08
No party preference	Hakan Mikado	5,346	0.08
No party preference	Johnny Wattenburg	4,973	0.07
No party preference	Desmond Silveira	4,633	0.07
No party preference	Shubham Goel	4,020	0.06
No party preference	Jeffrey E. Taylor	3,973	0.06
Write-in		124	0.00
Total votes		6,862,254	100.00

California general election
Party	Candidate	Votes	%	±%
Democratic	Gavin Newsom	7,721,410	61.95%	+1.98
Republican	John H. Cox	4,742,825	38.05%	–1.98
Total votes		12,464,235	100.00%	
Democratic hold				

== Colorado ==
2018 Colorado gubernatorial election
- November 6, 2018
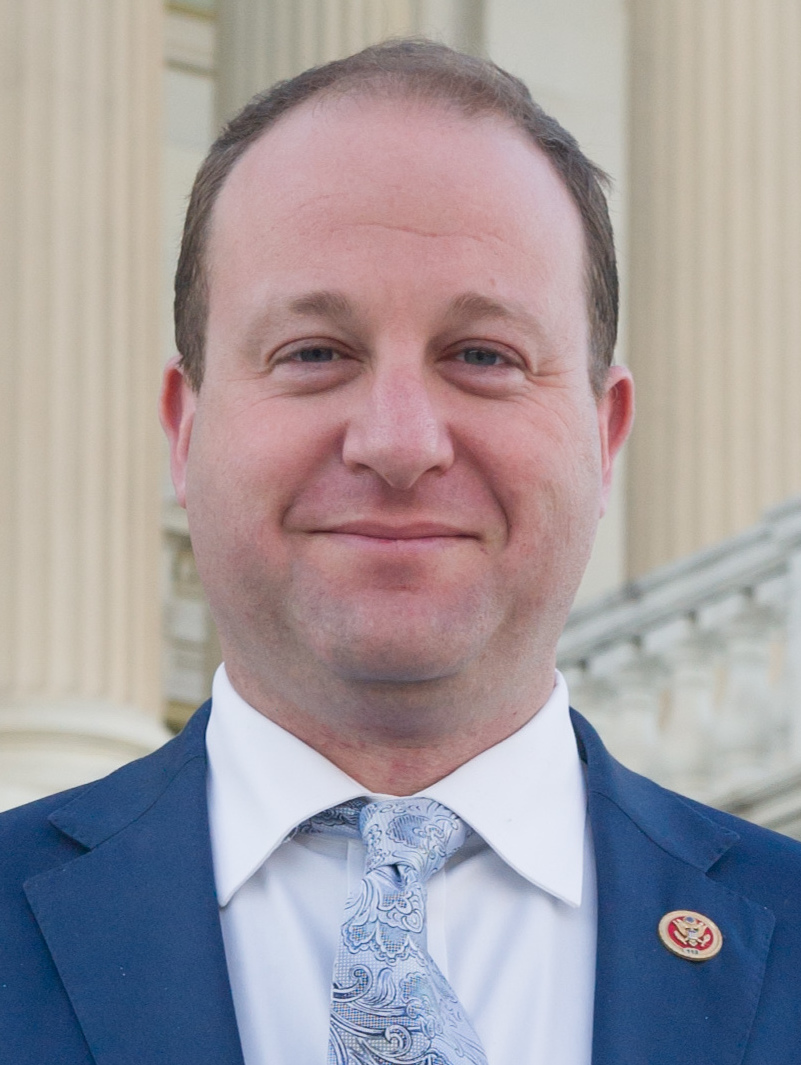

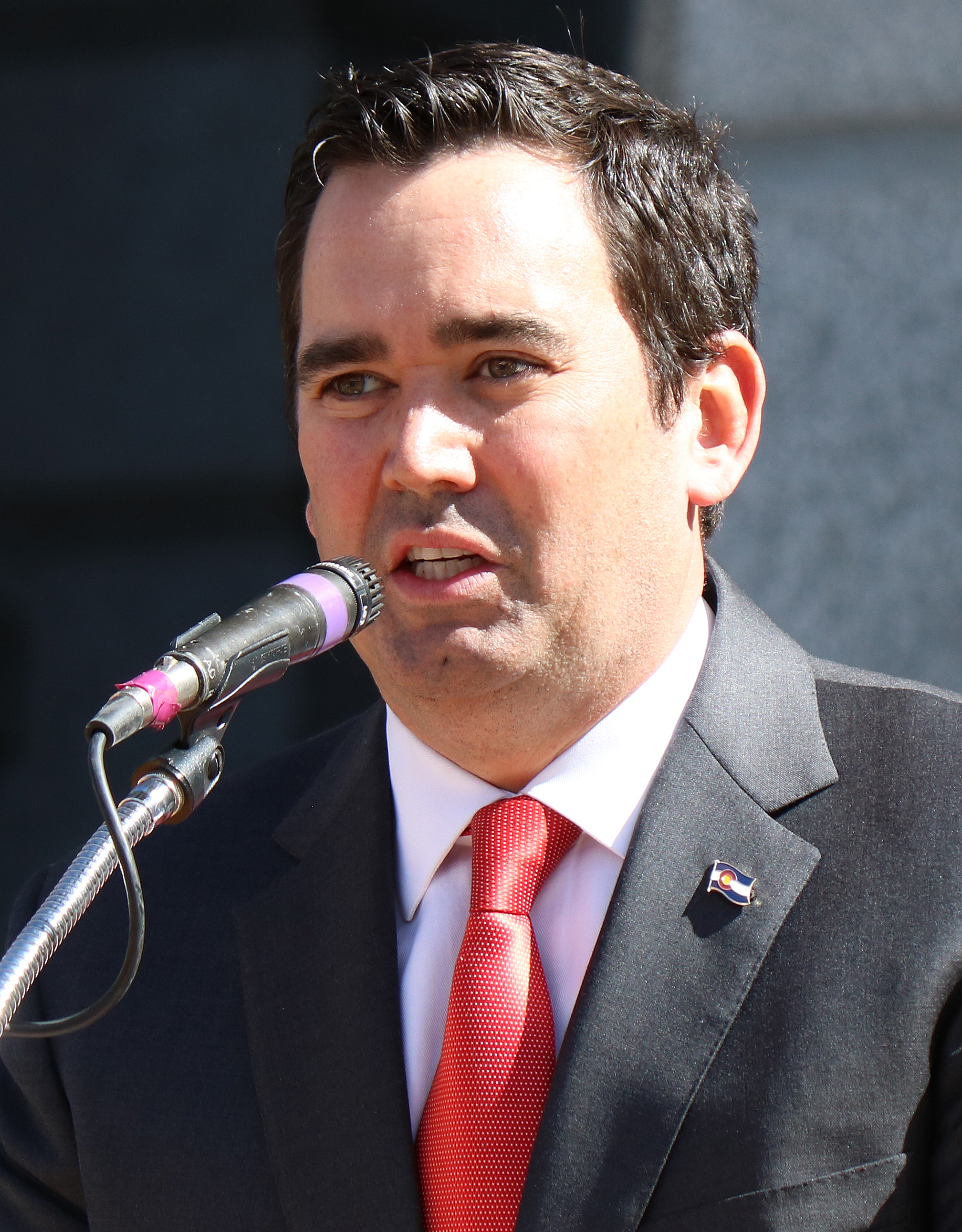
Nominee	Jared Polis	Walker Stapleton
Party	Democratic	Republican
Running mate	Dianne Primavera	Lang Sias
Popular vote	1,348,888	1,080,801
Percentage	53.4%	42.8%
- County results Polis: 40–50% 50–60% 60–70% 70–80% Stapleton: 40–50% 50–60% 60–70% 70–80% 80–90%
Governor before election
John Hickenlooper
Democratic
Elected Governor
Jared Polis
Democratic

Two-term Governor John Hickenlooper was term-limited, as Colorado does not allow governors to serve three consecutive terms.

The Democratic nominee was U.S. Representative Jared Polis.

The Republican nominee was Colorado State Treasurer Walker Stapleton.

Polis won the election.

Colorado Democratic primary
Party	Candidate	Votes	%
Democratic	Jared Polis	282,725	44.46
Democratic	Cary Kennedy	157,098	24.71
Democratic	Mike Johnston	149,717	23.55
Democratic	Donna Lynne	46,316	7.28
Total votes		635,856	100.00

Colorado Republican primary
Party	Candidate	Votes	%
Republican	Walker Stapleton	239,415	47.66
Republican	Victor Mitchell	151,365	30.13
Republican	Greg Lopez	66,330	13.20
Republican	Doug Robinson	45,245	9.01
Total votes		502,355	100.00

Colorado general election
Party	Candidate	Votes	%	±%
Democratic	Jared Polis	1,348,888	53.42%	+4.12
Republican	Walker Stapleton	1,080,801	42.80%	–3.15
Libertarian	Scott Helker	69,519	2.75%	+0.81
Unity	Bill Hammons	25,854	1.02%	N/A
Total votes		2,525,062	100.00%	
Democratic hold				

== Connecticut ==
2018 Connecticut gubernatorial election
- November 6, 2018
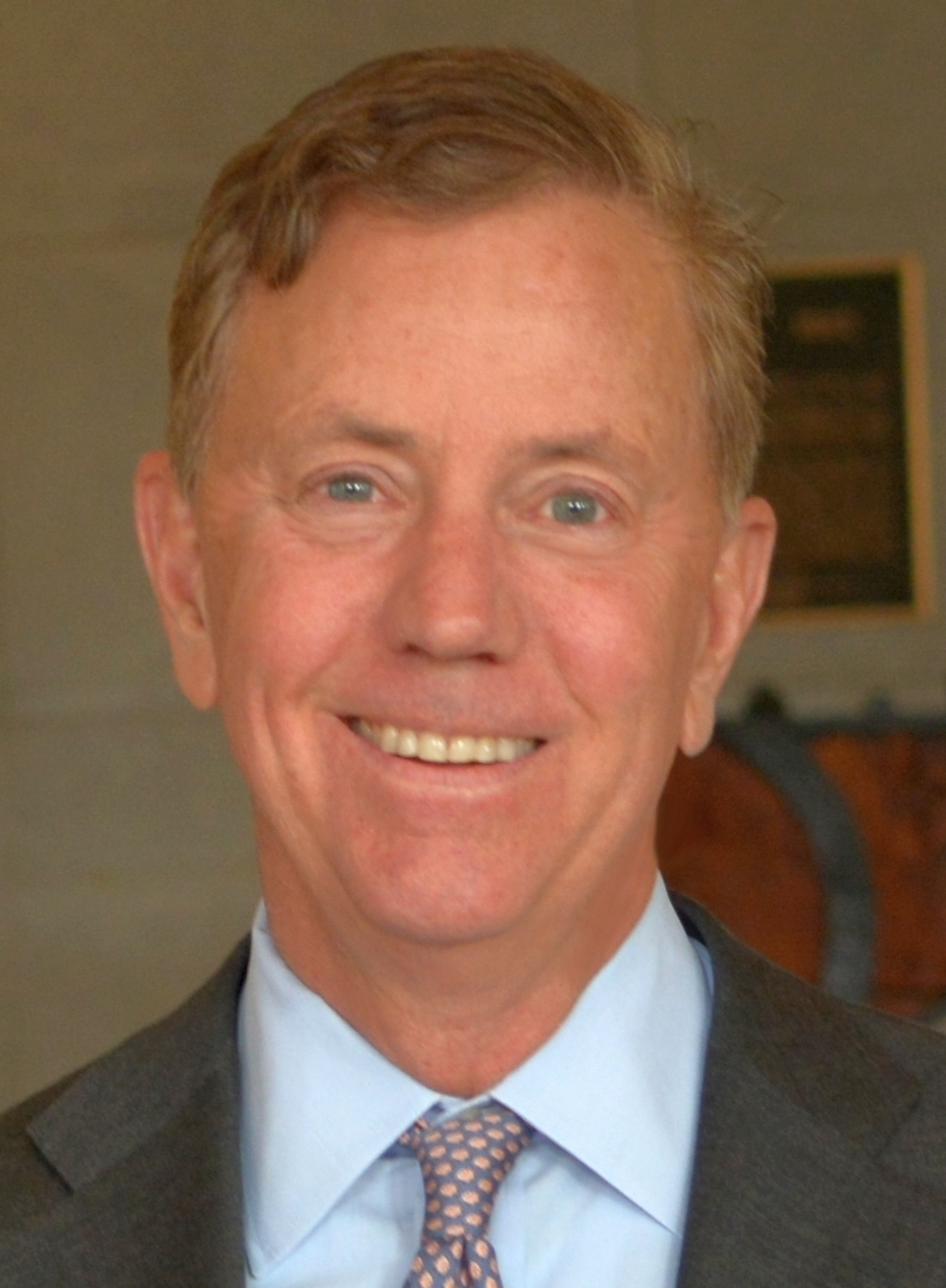

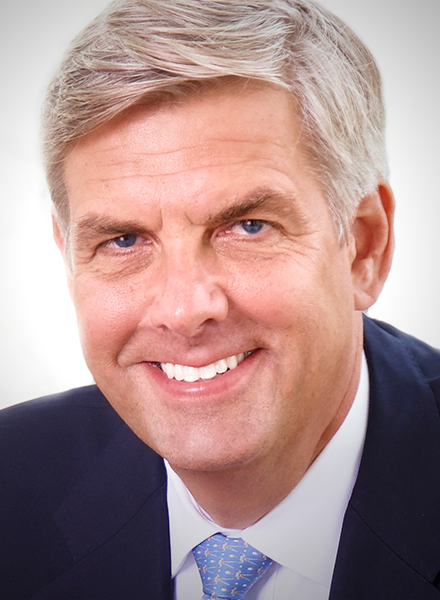
Nominee	Ned Lamont	Bob Stefanowski
Party	Democratic	Republican
Running mate	Susan Bysiewicz	Joe Markley
Popular vote	694,510	650,138
Percentage	49.4%	46.2%
- County results Lamont: 40–50% 50–60% Stefanowski: 40–50% 50–60%
Governor before election
Dannel Malloy
Democratic
Elected Governor
Ned Lamont
Democratic

Two-term Governor Dan Malloy was eligible to seek re-election, but declined to do so.

The Democratic nominee was former selectman from Greenwich Ned Lamont.

Republicans endorsed Mark Boughton, mayor of Danbury, at the statewide nominating convention held on May 11 and 12, 2018, at Foxwoods Resort Casino in Ledyard. Candidates qualifying to primary at the convention were former First Selectman of Trumbull Tim Herbst and former candidate for Congress Steve Obsitnik. Failing to qualify at the convention to primary were Shelton Mayor Mark Lauretti, former secretary of state candidate Peter Lumaj, state representative Prasad Srinivasan, former U.S. Comptroller General David Walker and Stamford Director of Administration, Mike Handler.

Businessman Bob Stefanowski became the second candidate in the history of Connecticut to petition to be on the primary ballot on June 18, 2018, and the first for a gubernatorial race. Businessman David Stemerman became the third to do so on June 19, 2018. Neither Stefanowski nor Stemerman participated in the statewide convention. Both Lauretti and Handler pledged to conduct a petition drive to get on the August 14, 2018, primary election ballot, but dropped out.

Micah Welintukonis, former vice chair of the Coventry Town Council ran as an independent.

Lamont won the election in a close race.

Connecticut Democratic primary
Party	Candidate	Votes	%
Democratic	Ned Lamont	172,024	81.17
Democratic	Joe Ganim	39,913	18.83
Total votes		211,937	100.00

Connecticut Republican primary
Party	Candidate	Votes	%
Republican	Bob Stefanowski	42,119	29.41
Republican	Mark Boughton	30,505	21.30
Republican	David Stemerman	26,276	18.35
Republican	Tim Herbst	25,144	17.56
Republican	Steve Obsitnik	19,151	13.37
Total votes		143,195	100.00

Connecticut general election
Party	Candidate	Votes	%	±%
Democratic	Ned Lamont	694,510	49.37%	–1.36
Republican	Bob Stefanowski	650,138	46.21%	–1.95
Independent	Oz Griebel	54,741	3.89%	N/A
Libertarian	Rod Hanscomb	6,086	0.43%	N/A
Constitution	Mark Greenstein	1,254	0.09%	N/A
Write-in		74	0.01%	–0.05
Total votes		1,406,803	100.00%	
Democratic hold				

== Florida ==
2018 Florida gubernatorial election
- November 6, 2018
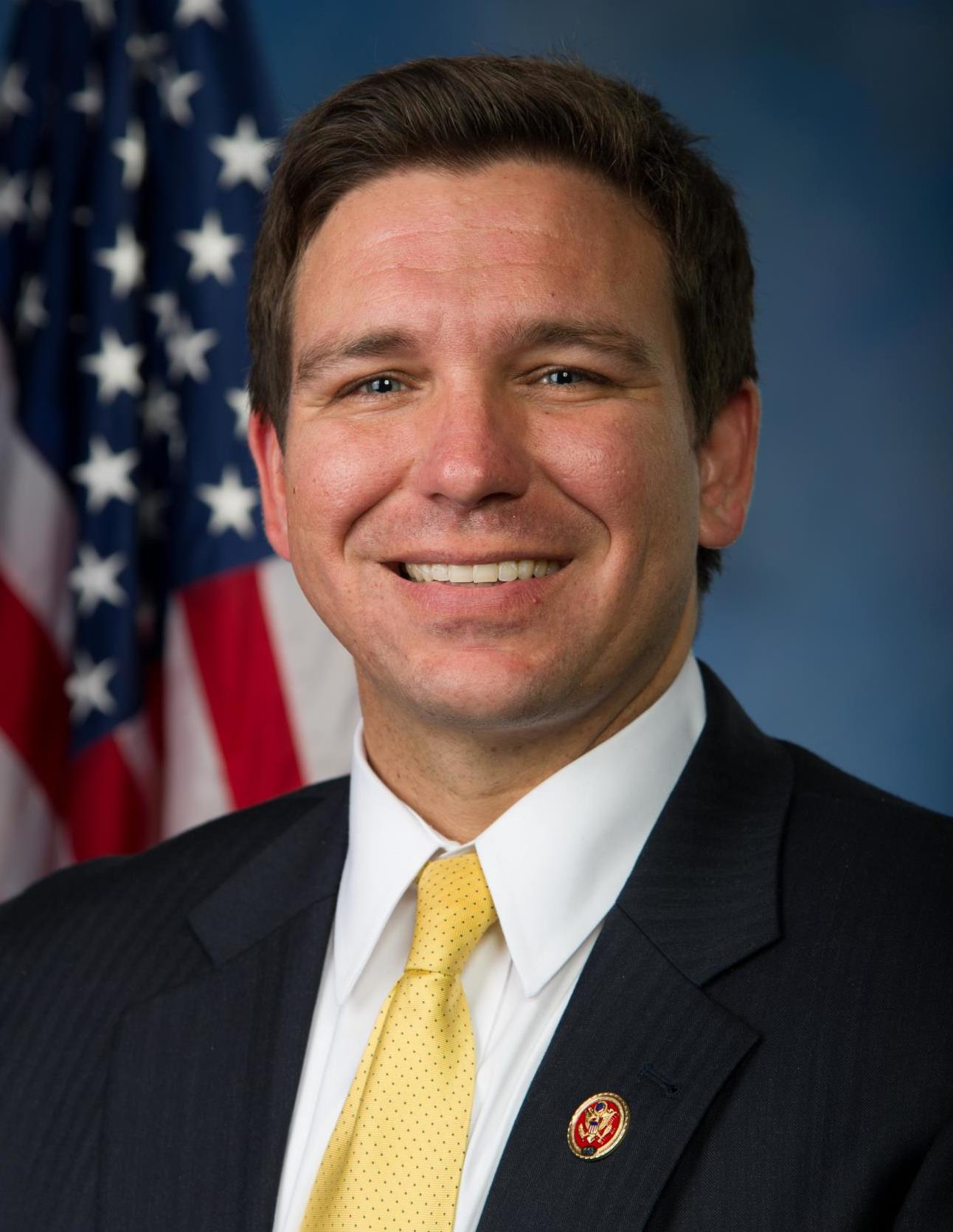

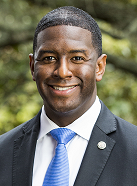
Nominee	Ron DeSantis	Andrew Gillum
Party	Republican	Democratic
Running mate	Jeanette Núñez	Chris King
Popular vote	4,076,186	4,043,723
Percentage	49.6%	49.2%
- County results DeSantis: 50–60% 60–70% 70–80% 80–90% Gillum: 50–60% 60–70%
Governor before election
Rick Scott
Republican
Elected Governor
Ron DeSantis
Republican

Two-term Governor Rick Scott was term-limited, as Florida does not allow governors to serve three consecutive terms.

U.S. Representative Ron DeSantis won the Republican nomination.

Tallahassee Mayor Andrew Gillum won the Democratic nomination.

Randy Wiseman sought the Libertarian nomination.

DeSantis narrowly won the election in a close race.

Florida Republican primary
Party	Candidate	Votes	%
Republican	Ron DeSantis	913,679	56.47
Republican	Adam Putnam	591,449	36.55
Republican	Bob White	32,580	2.01
Republican	Timothy M. Devine	21,320	1.32
Republican	Bob Langford	19,771	1.22
Republican	Bruce Nathan	14,487	0.90
Republican	Don Baldauf	13,125	0.81
Republican	John J. Mercadante	11,602	0.72
Total votes		1,618,013	100.00

Florida Democratic primary
Party	Candidate	Votes	%
Democratic	Andrew Gillum	517,417	34.29
Democratic	Gwen Graham	472,735	31.33
Democratic	Philip Levine	306,450	20.31
Democratic	Jeff Greene	151,935	10.07
Democratic	Chris King	37,464	2.48
Democratic	John Wetherbee	14,355	0.95
Democratic	Alex Lundmark	8,628	0.57
Total votes		1,508,984	100.00

Florida general election
Party	Candidate	Votes	%	±%
Republican	Ron DeSantis	4,076,186	49.59%	+1.45
Democratic	Andrew Gillum	4,043,723	49.19%	+2.12
Reform	Darcy Richardson	47,140	0.57%	N/A
Independent	Kyle Gibson	24,310	0.30%	N/A
Independent	Ryan C. Foley	14,630	0.18%	N/A
Independent	Bruce Stanley	14,505	0.18%	N/A
Write-in		67	0.00%	±0.00
Total votes		8,220,561	100.00%	
Republican hold				

== Georgia ==
2018 Georgia gubernatorial election
- November 6, 2018
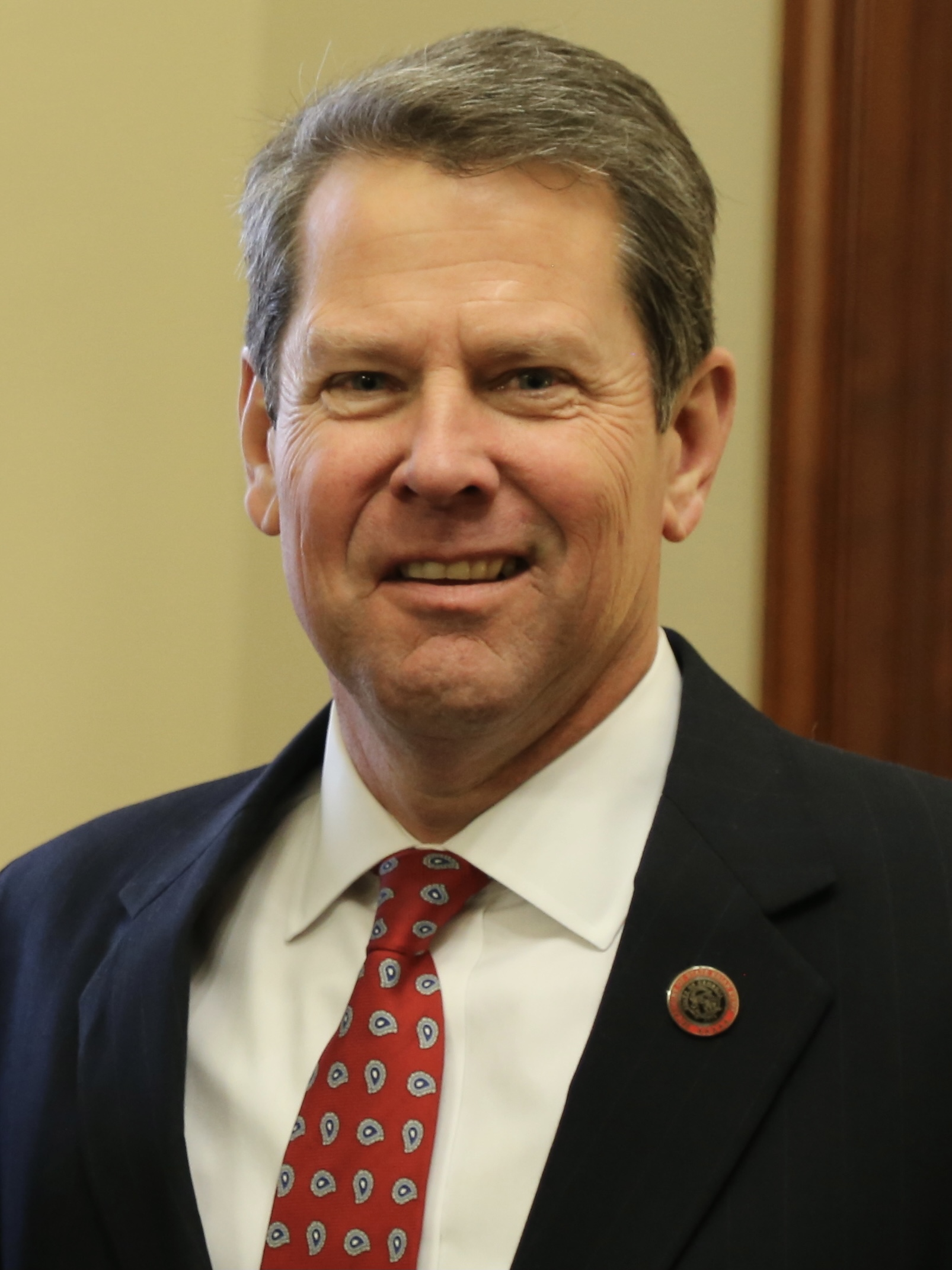

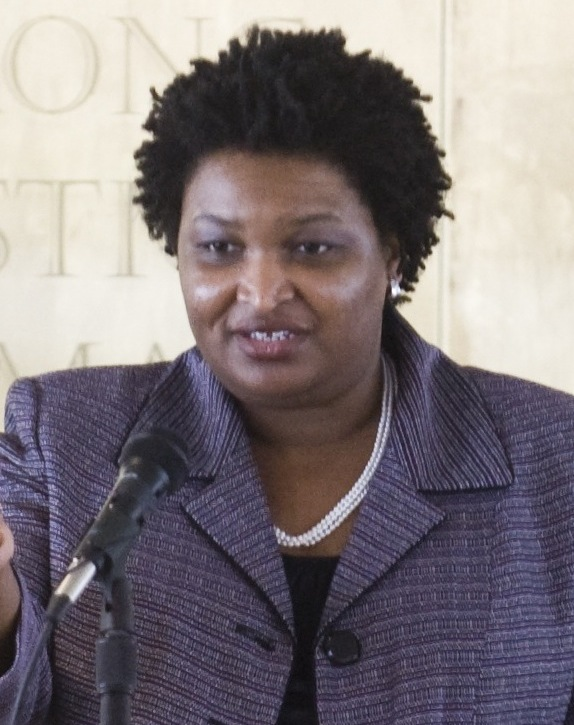
Nominee	Brian Kemp	Stacey Abrams
Party	Republican	Democratic
Popular vote	1,978,408	1,923,685
Percentage	50.2%	48.8%
- County results Kemp: 50–60% 60–70% 70–80% 80–90% >90% Abrams: 40–50% 50–60% 60–70% 70–80% 80–90%
Governor before election
Nathan Deal
Republican
Elected Governor
Brian Kemp
Republican

Two-term Governor Nathan Deal was term-limited, as Georgia does not allow governors to serve three consecutive terms.

Lieutenant Governor Casey Cagle and Secretary of State Brian Kemp won first and second place in the May 22 Republican primary; Cagle lost the runoff to Kemp on July 24, 2018.

State Representative Stacey Abrams garnered the Democratic nomination outright.

Ted Metz, chair of the Libertarian Party of Georgia, ran unopposed in the Libertarian primary.

Kemp won the election.

Georgia Republican primary
Party	Candidate	Votes	%
Republican	Casey Cagle	236,987	38.95
Republican	Brian Kemp	155,189	25.51
Republican	Hunter Hill	111,464	18.32
Republican	Clay Tippins	74,182	12.19
Republican	Michael Williams	29,619	4.87
Republican	Eddie Hayes	939	0.15
Total votes		608,380	100.00

Georgia Republican primary runoff
Party	Candidate	Votes	%
Republican	Brian Kemp	408,595	69.45
Republican	Casey Cagle	179,712	30.55
Total votes		588,307	100.00

Georgia Democratic primary
Party	Candidate	Votes	%
Democratic	Stacey Abrams	424,305	76.44
Democratic	Stacey Evans	130,784	23.56
Total votes		555,089	100.00

Georgia general election
Party	Candidate	Votes	%	±%
Republican	Brian Kemp	1,978,408	50.22%	–2.52
Democratic	Stacey Abrams	1,923,685	48.83%	+3.95
Libertarian	Ted Metz	37,235	0.95%	–1.41
Write-in		81	0.00%	–0.02
Total votes		3,939,409	100.00%	
Republican hold				

== Hawaii ==
2018 Hawaii gubernatorial election
- November 6, 2018
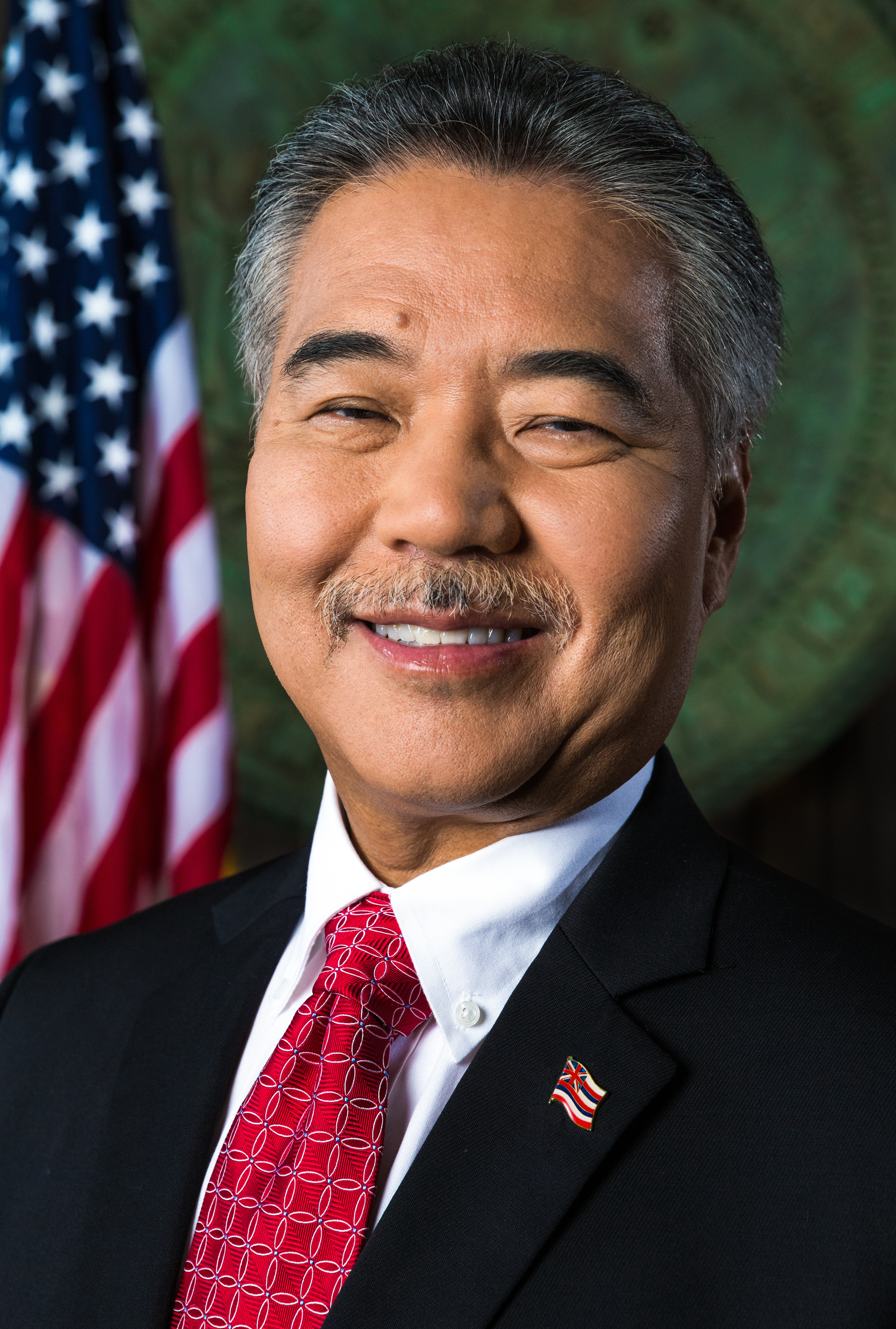

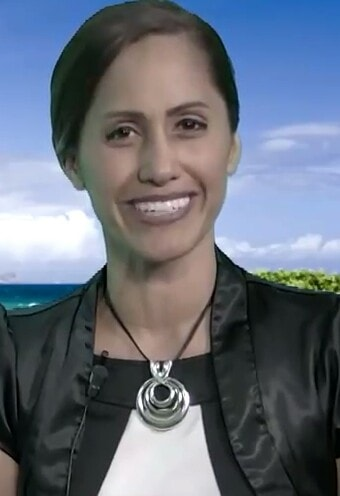
Nominee	David Ige	Andria Tupola
Party	Democratic	Republican
Running mate	Josh Green	Marissa Kerns
Popular vote	244,934	131,719
Percentage	62.7%	33.7%
- County results Ige: 60–70% 70–80%
Governor before election
David Ige
Democratic
Elected Governor
David Ige
Democratic

One-term Governor David Ige ran for re-election. Ige took office after defeating previous Governor Neil Abercrombie in the Democratic primary and then winning the general election. Ige was nominated again, after defeating a primary challenge by Congresswoman Colleen Hanabusa.

The Republican nominee was state house minority leader Andria Tupola.

Ige won re-election.

Hawaii Democratic primary
Party	Candidate	Votes	%
Democratic	David Ige (incumbent)	124,572	51.37
Democratic	Colleen Hanabusa	107,631	44.38
Democratic	Ernest Caravalho	5,662	2.33
Democratic	Wendell Ka'ehu'ae'a	2,298	0.95
Democratic	Richard Kim	1,576	0.65
Democratic	Van Tanabe	775	0.32
Total votes		242,514	100.00

Hawaii Republican primary
Party	Candidate	Votes	%
Republican	Andria Tupola	17,297	55.52
Republican	John Carroll	10,974	35.22
Republican	Ray L'Heureux	2,885	9.26
Total votes		31,156	100.0

Hawaii general election
Party	Candidate	Votes	%	±%
Democratic	David Ige (incumbent)	244,934	62.67%	+13.22
Republican	Andria Tupola	131,719	33.70%	–3.38
Green	Jim Brewer	10,123	2.59%	N/A
Nonpartisan	Terrence Teruya	4,067	1.04%	N/A
Total votes		390,843	100.00%	
Democratic hold				

== Idaho ==
2018 Idaho gubernatorial election
- November 6, 2018
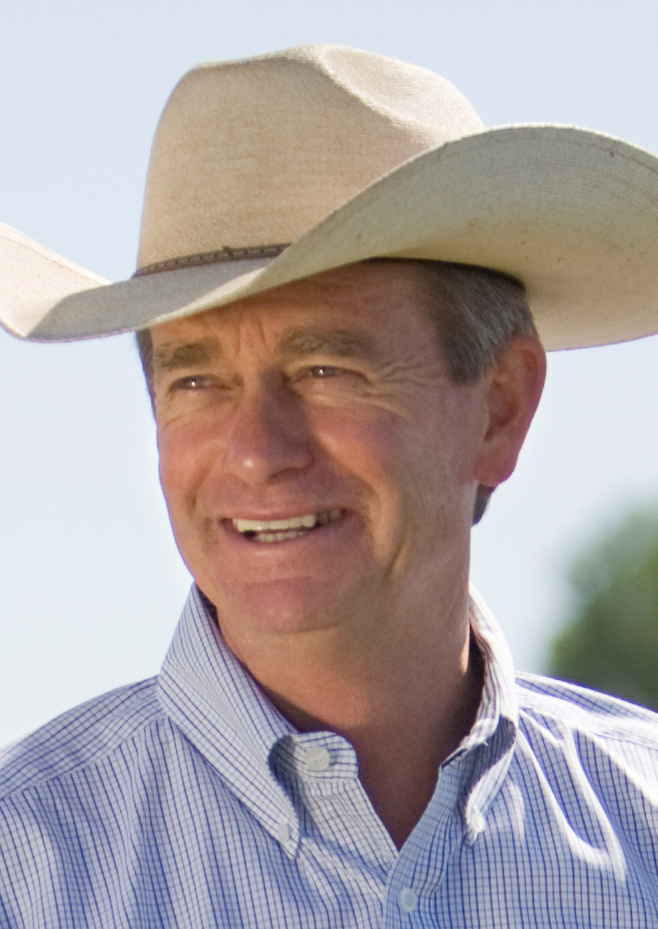

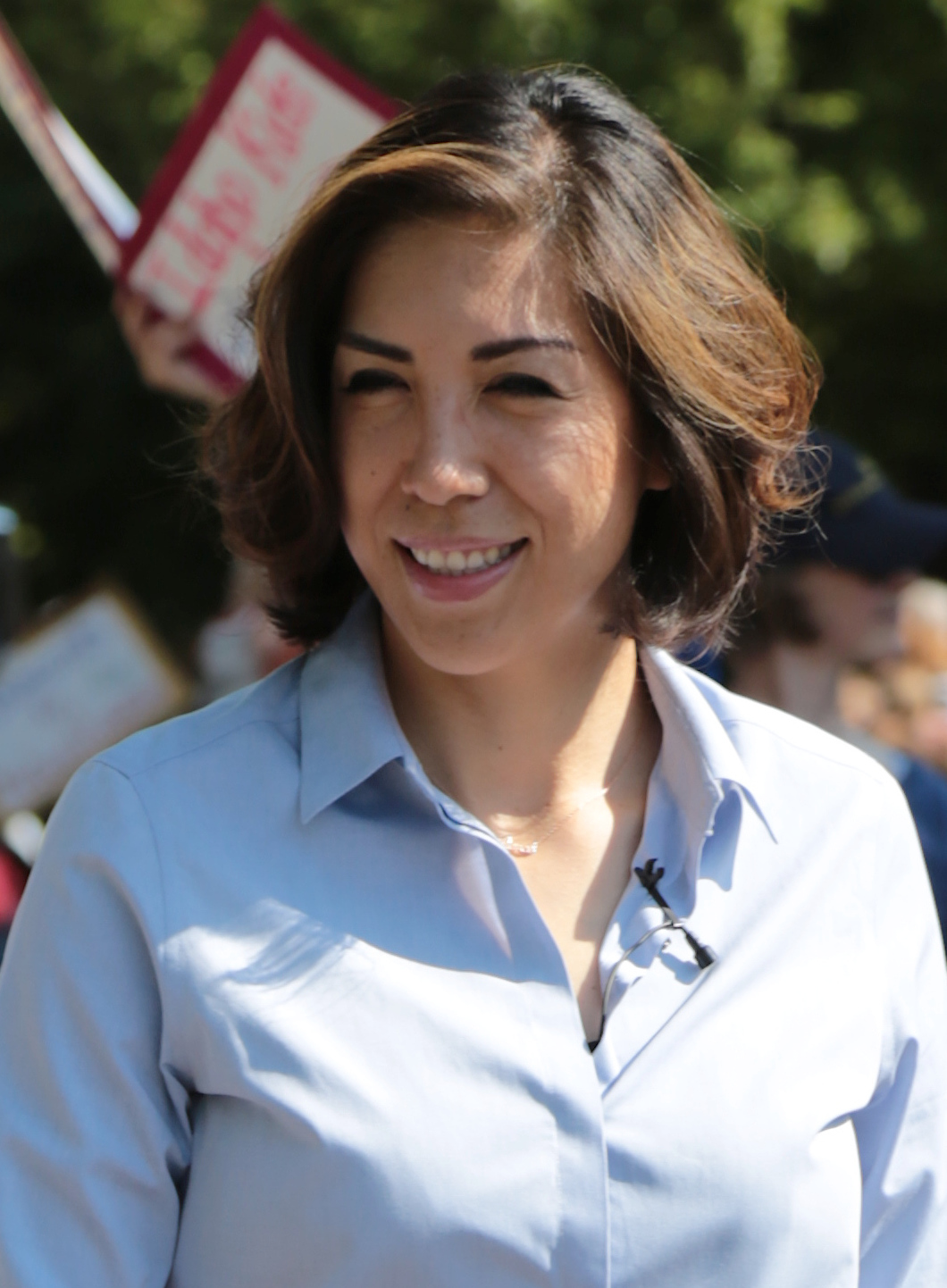
Nominee	Brad Little	Paulette Jordan
Party	Republican	Democratic
Popular vote	361,661	231,081
Percentage	59.8%	38.2%
- County Results; Little: 50–60% 60–70% 70–80% 80–90% Jordan: 40–50% 50–60% 60–70%
Governor before election
Butch Otter
Republican
Elected Governor
Brad Little
Republican

Three-term Governor Butch Otter was eligible to seek re-election, but did not do so.

Lieutenant Governor Brad Little won the Republican nomination.

Paulette Jordan, a former state representative, was nominated in the Democratic primary.

Little won the election.

Idaho Republican primary
Party	Candidate	Votes	%
Republican	Brad Little	72,518	37.29
Republican	Raúl Labrador	63,460	32.64
Republican	Tommy Ahlquist	50,977	26.22
Republican	Lisa Marie	3,390	1.74
Republican	Steve Pankey	2,701	1.39
Republican	Harley Brown	874	0.45
Republican	Dalton Cannady	528	0.27
Total votes		194,448	100.00

Idaho Democratic primary
Party	Candidate	Votes	%
Democratic	Paulette Jordan	38,483	58.44
Democratic	A.J. Balukoff	26,403	40.09
Democratic	Peter Dill	964	1.47
Total votes		65,850	100.00

Idaho general election
Party	Candidate	Votes	%	±%
Republican	Brad Little	361,661	59.76%	+6.24
Democratic	Paulette Jordan	231,081	38.19%	–0.36
Libertarian	Bev Boeck	6,551	1.08%	–2.99
Constitution	Walter L. Bayes	5,787	0.96%	–0.23
Write-in		51	0.00%	–0.02
Total votes		605,131	100.00%	
Republican hold				

== Illinois ==
2018 Illinois gubernatorial election
- November 6, 2018
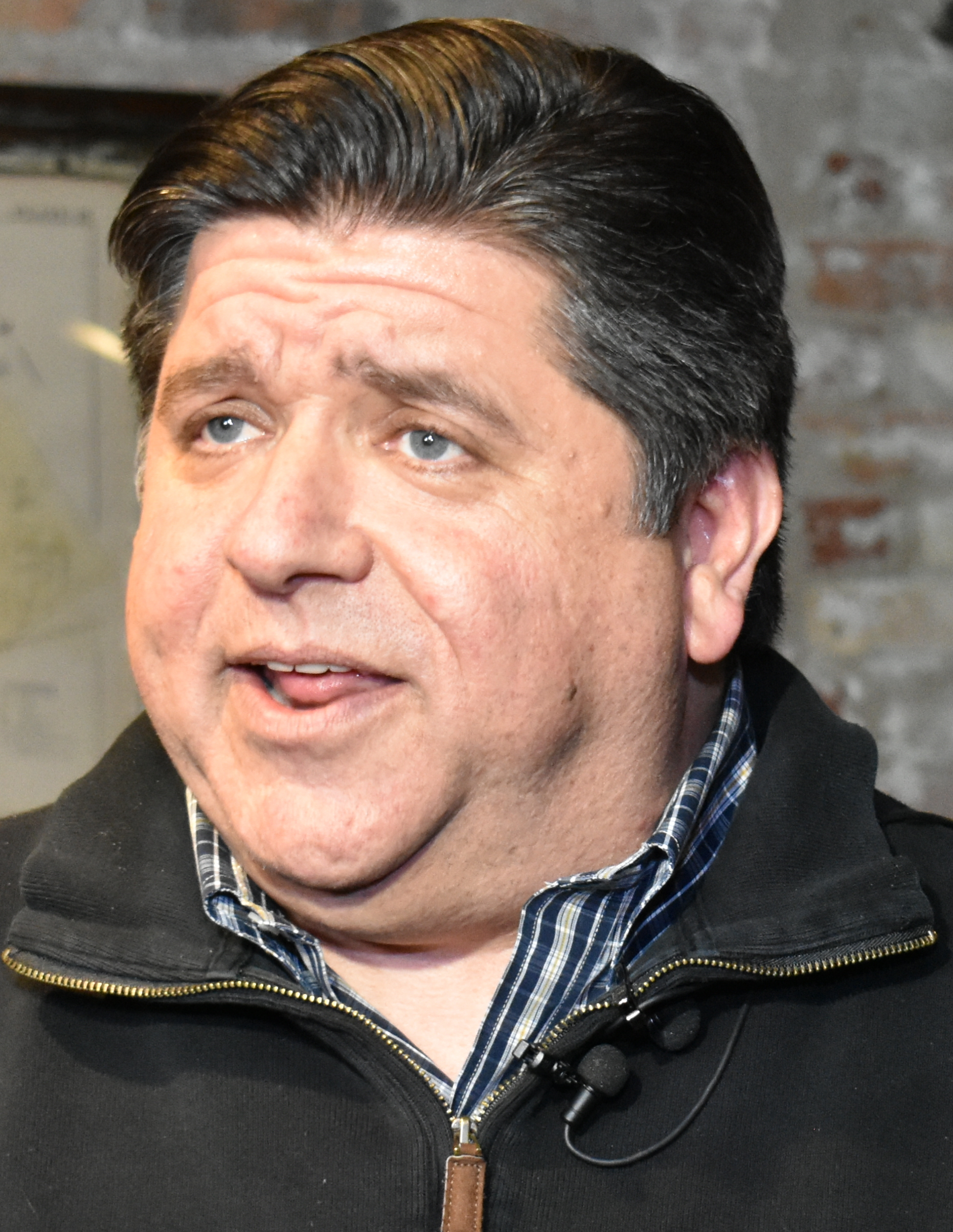

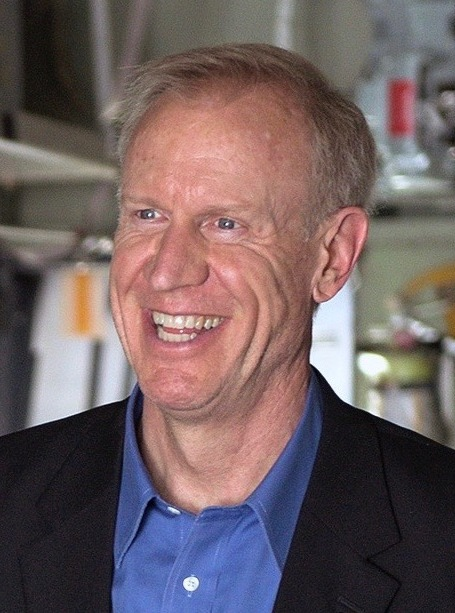
Nominee	J. B. Pritzker	Bruce Rauner
Party	Democratic	Republican
Running mate	Juliana Stratton	Evelyn Sanguinetti
Popular vote	2,479,746	1,765,751
Percentage	54.5%	38.8%
- County Results; Pritzker: 40-50% 50–60% 60–70% 70–80% Rauner: 40–50% 50–60% 60–70% 70–80%
Governor before election
Bruce Rauner
Republican
Elected Governor
J. B. Pritzker
Democratic

One-term incumbent Republican Bruce Rauner ran for re-election. State Representative Jeanne Ives also ran for the Republican nomination, but lost narrowly to Rauner.

On the Democratic side, Madison County Regional Superintendent of Schools Bob Daiber, former chairman of the University of Illinois Board of Trustees and member of the Kennedy family Chris Kennedy, State Representative Scott Drury, State Senator Daniel Biss, and venture capitalist J. B. Pritzker all ran for the Democratic nomination. Pritzker, who is related to former United States Secretary of Commerce Penny Pritzker, won the primary, and became one of the wealthiest governors in United States history upon election.

Libertarian candidate Kash Jackson was nominated at the state party convention on March 3. He defeated Matt Scaro and Jon Stewart.

Pritzker won the election in a landslide.

Illinois Republican primary
Party	Candidate	Votes	%
Republican	Bruce Rauner (incumbent)	372,124	51.53
Republican	Jeanne Ives	350,038	48.47
Total votes		744,248	100.00

Illinois Democratic primary
Party	Candidate	Votes	%
Democratic	J. B. Pritzker	597,756	45.13
Democratic	Daniel Biss	353,625	26.70
Democratic	Chris Kennedy	322,730	24.37
Democratic	Tio Hardiman	21,075	1.59
Democratic	Bob Daiber	15,009	1.13
Democratic	Robert Marshall	14,353	1.08
Total votes		1,324,548	100.00

Illinois general election
Party	Candidate	Votes	%	±%
Democratic	J. B. Pritzker	2,479,746	54.53%	+8.18
Republican	Bruce Rauner (incumbent)	1,765,751	38.83%	–11.44
Conservative	Sam McCann	192,527	4.23%	N/A
Libertarian	Kash Jackson	109,518	2.40%	–0.95
Write-in		115	0.01%	–0.02
Total votes		4,547,657	100.00%	
Democratic gain from Republican				

== Iowa ==
2018 Iowa gubernatorial election
- November 6, 2018
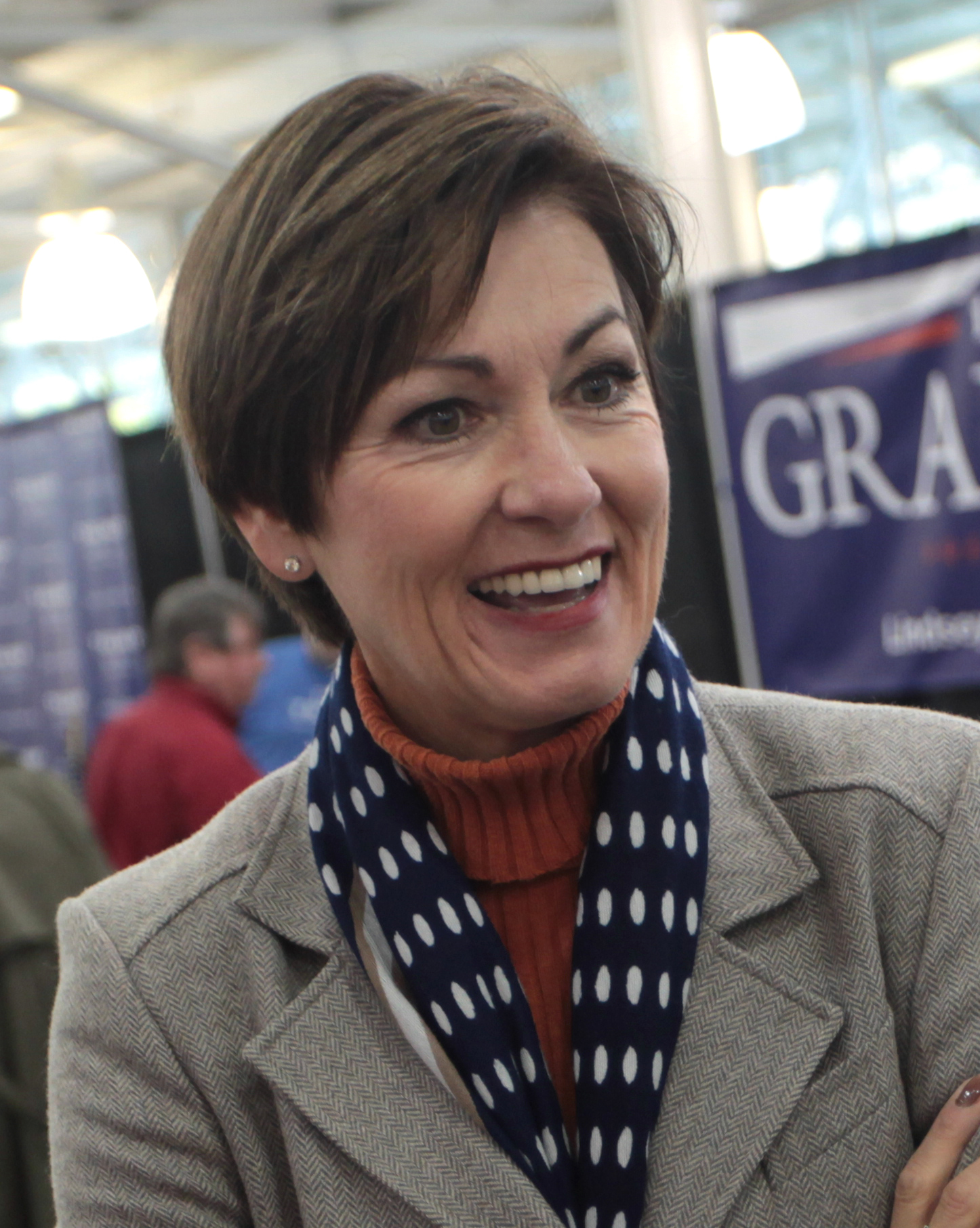

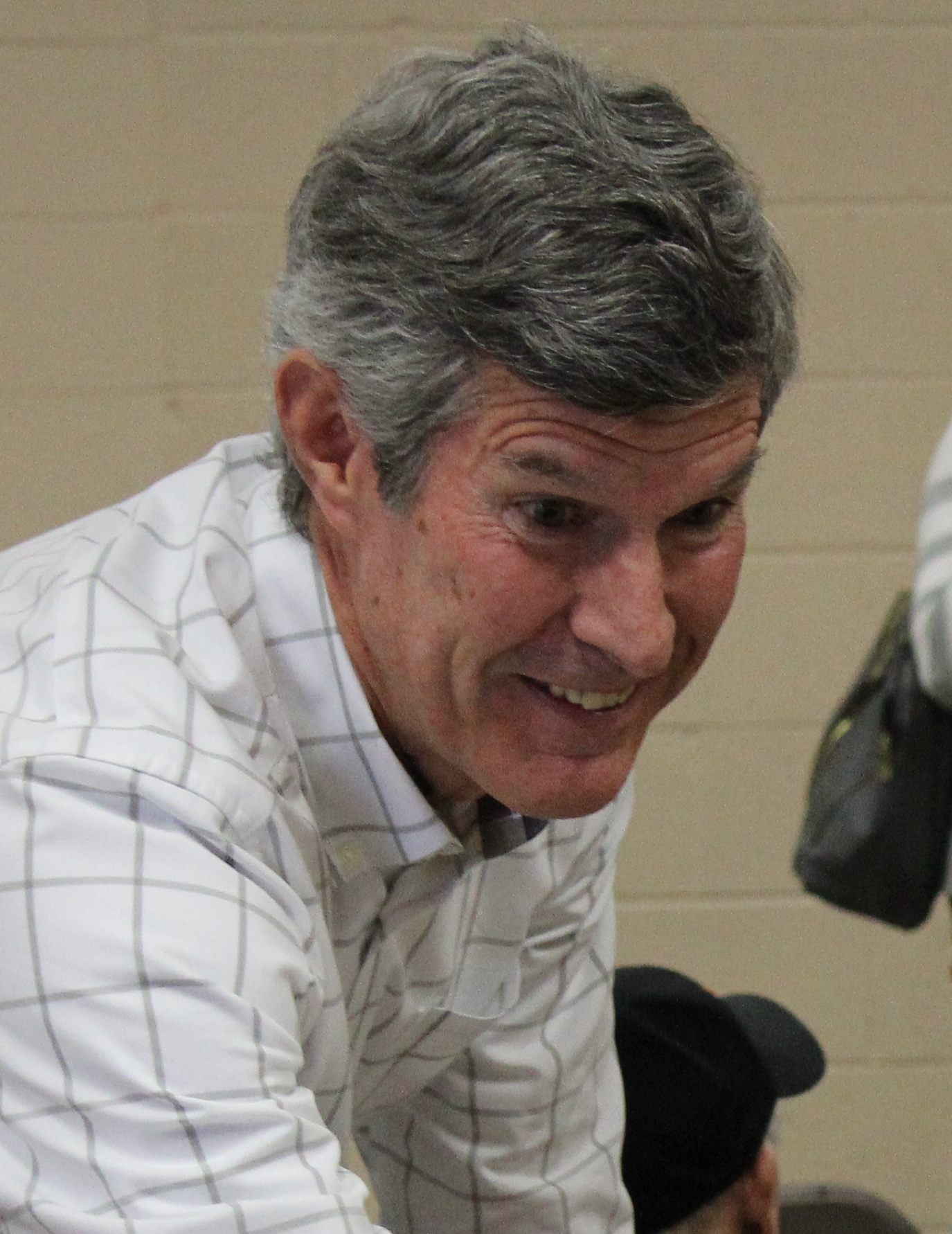
Nominee	Kim Reynolds	Fred Hubbell
Party	Republican	Democratic
Running mate	Adam Gregg	Rita Hart
Popular vote	667,275	630,986
Percentage	50.3%	47.5%
- County results Reynolds: 40–50% 50–60% 60–70% 70-80% Hubbell: 40–50% 50–60% 70–80%
Governor before election
Kim Reynolds
Republican
Elected Governor
Kim Reynolds
Republican

Incumbent governor Kim Reynolds took office in 2017, upon the resignation of Terry Branstad, following his confirmation as ambassador to China. Reynolds sought election to a full term in 2018.

Former gubernatorial aide John Norris, state Senator Nate Boulton, former state party chairwoman Andy McGuire, SEIU leader Cathy Glasson, attorney Jon Neiderbach, former Iowa City Mayor Ross Wilburn, and businessman Fred Hubbell sought the Democratic nomination, which Hubbell won.

Jake Porter, who was the Libertarian nominee for secretary of state in 2010 and 2014, ran for the Libertarian nomination for governor.

Reynolds won the election.

Iowa Republican primary
Party	Candidate	Votes	%
Republican	Kim Reynolds (incumbent)	94,118	98.63
Write-in		1,307	1.37
Total votes		95,425	100.00

Iowa Democratic primary
Party	Candidate	Votes	%
Democratic	Fred Hubbell	99,245	55.41
Democratic	Cathy Glasson	36,815	20.55
Democratic	John Norris	20,498	11.44
Democratic	Andy McGuire	9,404	5.25
Democratic	Nate Boulton	9,082	5.07
Democratic	Ross Wilburn	3,880	2.17
Write-in		200	0.01
Total votes		179,124	100.00

Iowa general election
Party	Candidate	Votes	%	±%
Republican	Kim Reynolds (incumbent)	667,275	50.26%	–8.73
Democratic	Fred Hubbell	630,986	47.53%	+10.26
Libertarian	Jake Porter	21,426	1.61%	–0.19
Independent	Gary Siegwarth	7,463	0.56%	N/A
Write-in		488	0.04%	–0.05
Total votes		1,327,638	100.00%	
Republican hold				

== Kansas ==
2018 Kansas gubernatorial election
- November 6, 2018
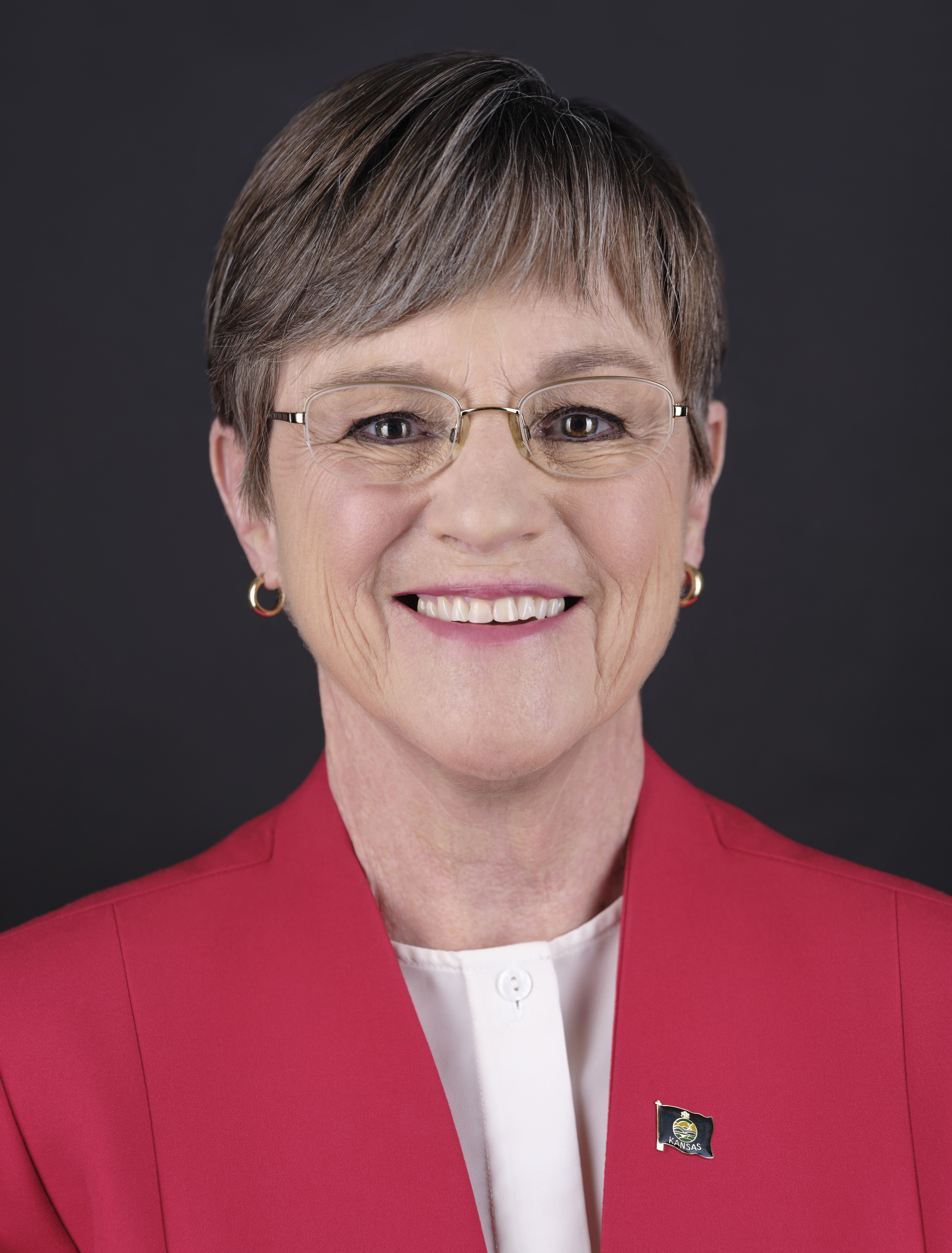

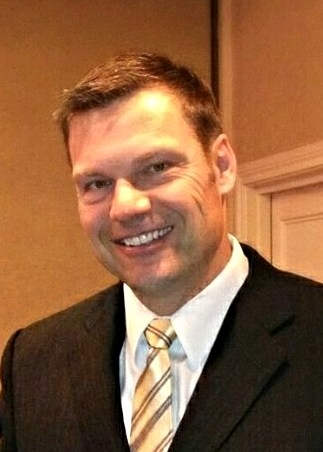

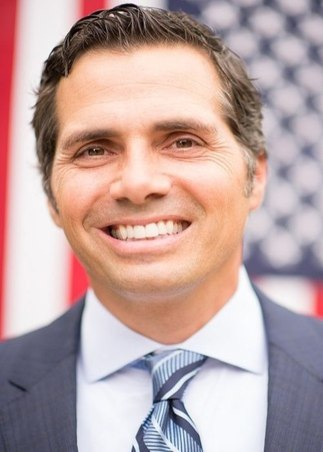
Nominee	Laura Kelly	Kris Kobach	Greg Orman
Party	Democratic	Republican	Independent
Running mate	Lynn Rogers	Wink Hartman	John Doll
Popular vote	506,727	453,645	68,590
Percentage	48.0%	43.0%	6.5%
- County Results; Kelly: 40-50% 50–60% 60–70% 70–80% Kobach: 40–50% 50–60% 60–70% 70–80%
Governor before election
Jeff Colyer
Republican
Elected Governor
Laura Kelly
Democratic

Jeff Colyer succeeded Sam Brownback in January 2018 after he was confirmed as the United States Ambassador-at-Large for International Religious Freedom.

Secretary of State Kris Kobach defeated Governor Colyer, Kansas Insurance Commissioner Ken Selzer, former state Senator Jim Barnett, and former state Representative Mark Hutton for the Republican nomination.

The Democratic nominee was state Senator Laura Kelly.

Businessman Greg Orman, who finished second in the 2014 U.S. Senate election in Kansas, ran as an independent.

Kelly won the election.

Kansas Republican primary
Party	Candidate	Votes	%
Republican	Kris Kobach	128,838	40.62
Republican	Jeff Colyer (incumbent)	128,488	40.51
Republican	Jim Barnett	27,993	8.83
Republican	Ken Selzer	24,807	7.82
Republican	Patrick Kucera	3,212	1.01
Republican	Tyler Ruzich	2,276	0.72
Republican	Joseph Tutera Jr.	1,559	0.49
Total votes		317,173	100.00

Kansas Democratic primary
Party	Candidate	Votes	%
Democratic	Laura Kelly	78,746	51.5
Democratic	Carl Brewer	30,693	20.1
Democratic	Josh Svaty	26,722	17.5
Democratic	Arden Andersen	12,845	8.4
Democratic	Jack Bergeson	3,850	2.5
Total votes		152,856	100.0

Kansas general election
Party	Candidate	Votes	%	±%
Democratic	Laura Kelly	506,727	48.01%	+1.88
Republican	Kris Kobach	453,645	42.98%	–6.84
Independent	Greg Orman	68,590	6.50%	N/A
Libertarian	Jeff Caldwell	20,020	1.90%	–2.15
Independent	Rick Kloos	6,584	0.62%	N/A
Total votes		1,055,566	100.00%	
Democratic gain from Republican				

== Maine ==
2018 Maine gubernatorial election
- November 6, 2018
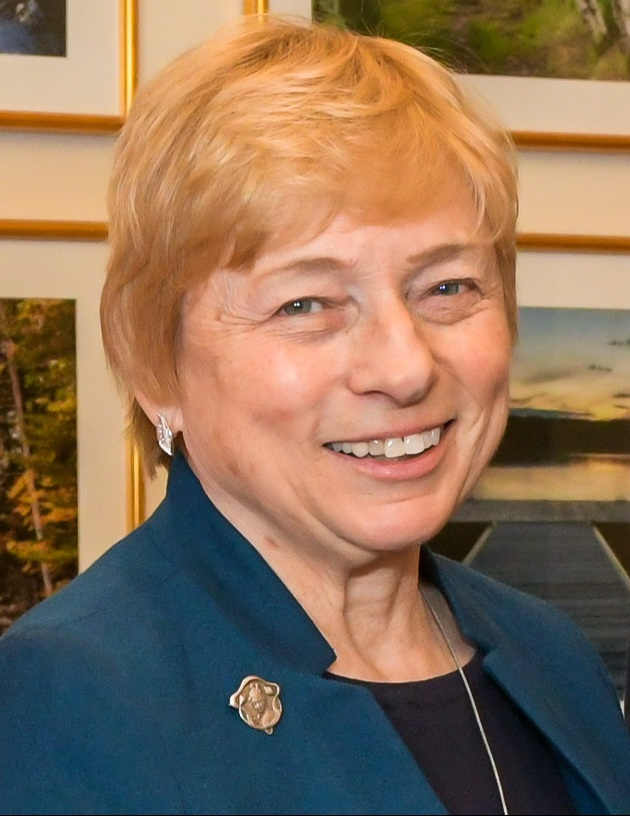

Nominee	Janet Mills	Shawn Moody	Terry Hayes
Party	Democratic	Republican	Independent
Popular vote	320,962	272,311	37,268
Percentage	50.9%	43.2%	5.9%
- County results Mills: 40-50% 50–60% 60–70% Moody: 40–50% 50–60%
Governor before election
Paul LePage
Republican
Elected Governor
Janet Mills
Democratic

Two-term governor Paul LePage was term-limited, as Maine does not allow governors to serve three consecutive terms. LePage won re-election in a three-way race over Democrat Mike Michaud and independent Eliot Cutler, in 2014. The primary election was June 12, and conducted with ranked choice voting, a system recently implemented and being used for the first time in the 2018 elections in Maine. It was not used in the general election due to an advisory opinion by the Maine Supreme Judicial Court calling its use in general elections for state offices unconstitutional.

Businessman and 2010 independent candidate for governor Shawn Moody won the Republican nomination.

The Democratic nominee was Attorney General Janet Mills.

Two independent candidates qualified for the ballot; State Treasurer Terry Hayes and businessman and newspaper columnist Alan Caron.

Mills won the election.

Maine Republican primary results
Party	Candidate	Votes	%
Republican	Shawn Moody	53,436	52.60
Republican	Garrett Mason	21,571	21.23
Republican	Mary Mayhew	14,034	13.82
Republican	Blank ballots	7,203	7.09
Republican	Ken Fredette	5,341	5.26
Total votes		101,585	100.00

Maine Democratic primary
Party	Candidate	Round 1			Round 2			Round 3			Round 4	
Party	Candidate	Votes	%	Transfer	Votes	%	Transfer	Votes	%	Transfer	Votes	%
Democratic	Janet Mills	41,735	33.09	+ 2,307	44,042	35.49	+ 5,903	49,945	40.77	+ 13,439	63,384	54.06
Democratic	Adam Cote	35,478	28.13	+ 2,065	37,543	30.25	+ 5,080	42,623	34.79	+ 11,243	53,866	45.94
Democratic	Betsy Sweet	20,767	16.46	+ 2,220	22,987	18.52	+ 6,957	29,944	24.44	29,944	Eliminated	
Democratic	Mark Eves	17,887	14.18	+ 1,634	19,521	15.73	19,521	Eliminated				
Democratic	Mark Dion	5,200	4.12	5,200	Eliminated							
Democratic	Diane Russell	2,728	2.16	2,728	Eliminated							
Democratic	Donna Dion	1,596	1.27	1,596	Eliminated							
Write-ins		748	0.59	748	Eliminated							
Total votes											132,250	100.00

Maine general election
Party	Candidate	Votes	%	±%
Democratic	Janet Mills	320,962	50.89%	+7.52
Republican	Shawn Moody	272,311	43.18%	–5.01
Independent	Terry Hayes	37,268	5.91%	N/A
Write-in		126	0.02%	+0.01
Total votes		630,667	100.00%	
Democratic gain from Republican				

== Maryland ==
2018 Maryland gubernatorial election
- November 6, 2018
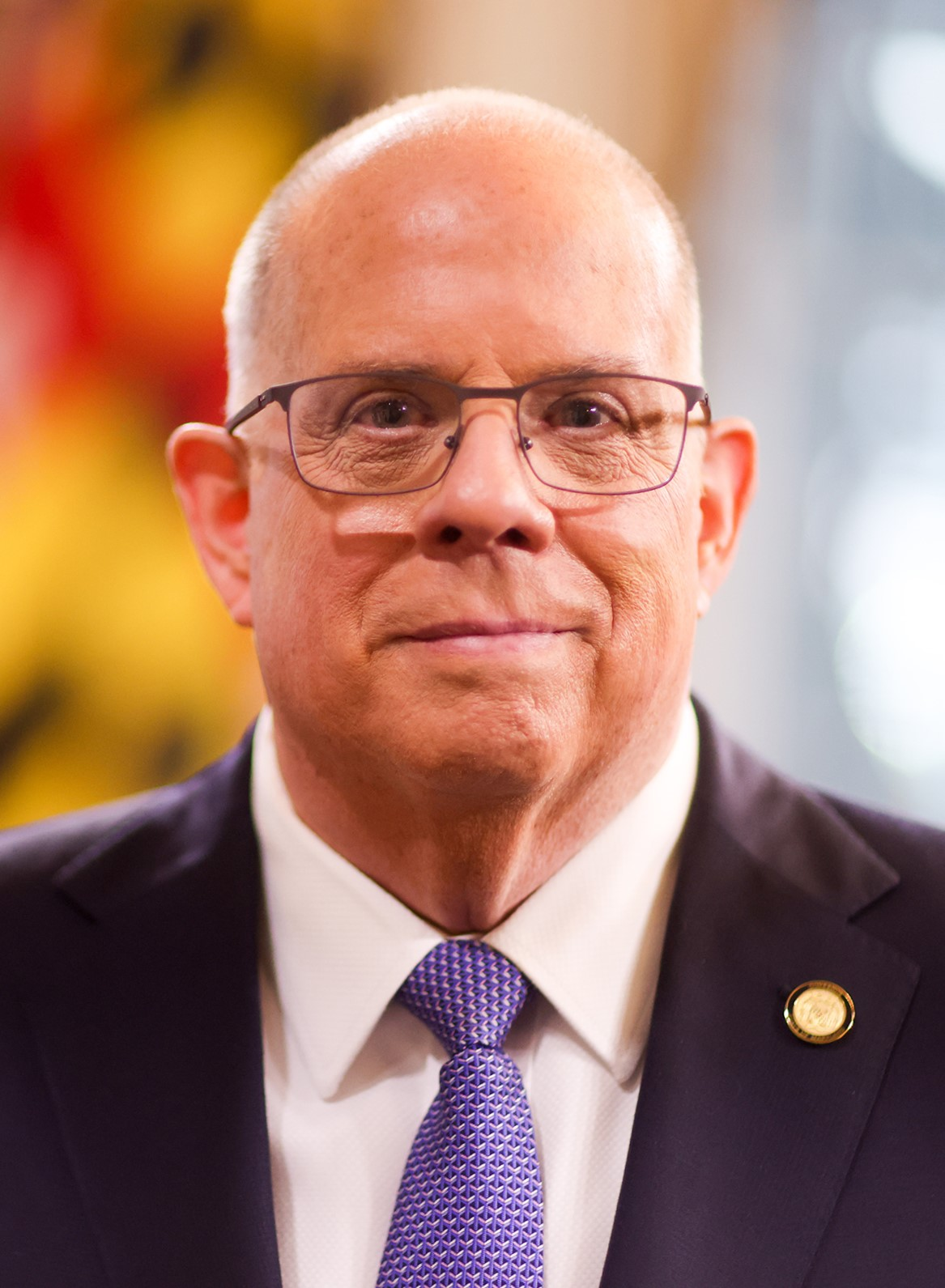

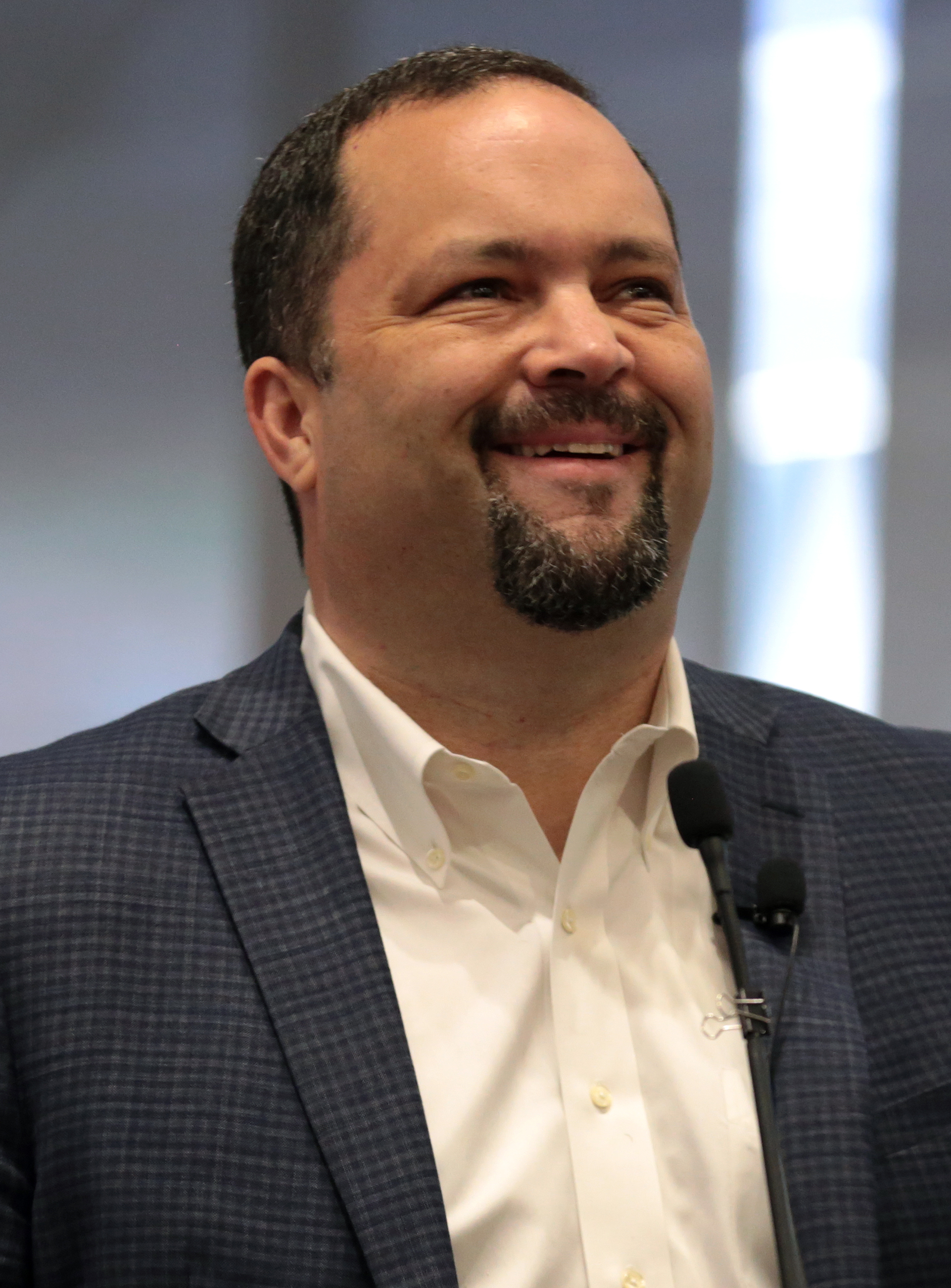
Nominee	Larry Hogan	Ben Jealous
Party	Republican	Democratic
Running mate	Boyd Rutherford	Susan Turnbull
Popular vote	1,275,644	1,002,639
Percentage	55.4%	43.5%
- County results Hogan: 50–60% 60–70% 70–80% 80–90% Jealous: 40–50% 50–60% 60–70% 70–80%
Governor before election
Larry Hogan
Republican
Elected Governor
Larry Hogan
Republican

One-term Republican incumbent Larry Hogan ran for re-election.

Former president of the NAACP Benjamin Jealous was the Democratic nominee.

Green Party candidate and entrepreneur Ian Schlakman sought his party's nomination. Libertarian Shawn Quinn was nominated the LP's candidate by convention.

Hogan won re-election.

Maryland Republican primary
Party	Candidate	Votes	%
Republican	Larry Hogan (incumbent)	210,935	100.00
Total votes		210,935	100.00

Maryland Democratic primary
Party	Candidate	Votes	%
Democratic	Ben Jealous	231,895	39.59
Democratic	Rushern Baker	171,696	29.31
Democratic	Jim Shea	48,647	8.31
Democratic	Krish O'Mara Vignarajah	48,041	8.20
Democratic	Richard Madaleno	34,184	5.84
Democratic	Valerie Ervin	18,851	3.22
Democratic	Alec Ross	13,780	2.35
Democratic	Ralph Jaffe	9,405	1.61
Democratic	James Jones	9,188	1.57
Total votes		585,687	100.00

Maryland general election
Party	Candidate	Votes	%	±%
Republican	Larry Hogan (incumbent)	1,275,644	55.35%	+4.32
Democratic	Ben Jealous	1,002,639	43.51%	–3.74
Libertarian	Shawn Quinn	13,241	0.57%	–0.89
Green	Ian Schlakman	11,175	0.48%	N/A
Write-in		1,813	0.08%	–0.18
Total votes		2,304,512	100.00%	
Republican hold				

== Massachusetts ==
2018 Massachusetts gubernatorial election
- November 6, 2018
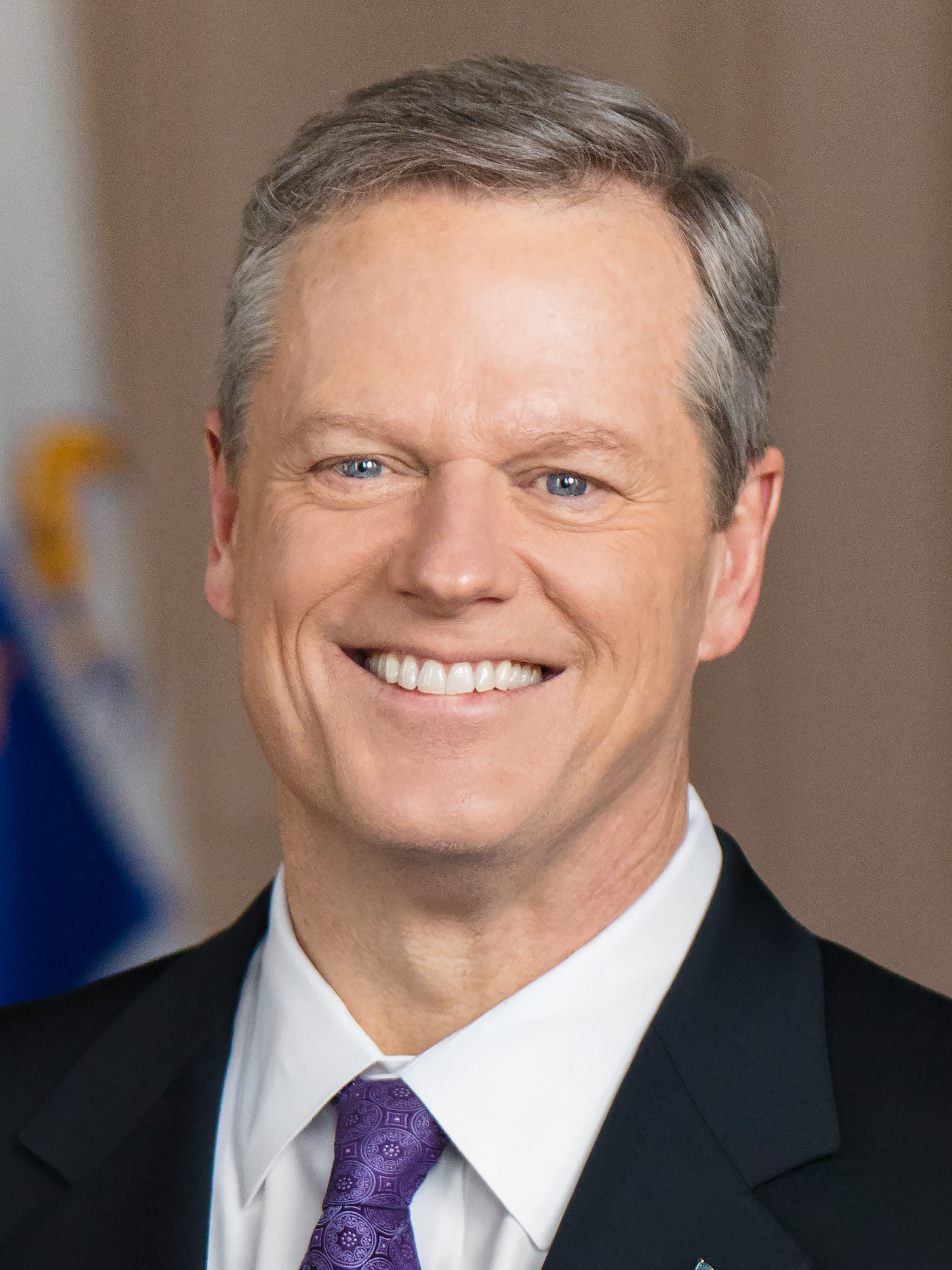

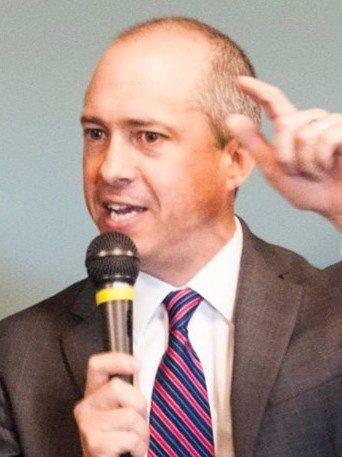
Nominee	Charlie Baker	Jay Gonzalez
Party	Republican	Democratic
Running mate	Karyn Polito	Quentin Palfrey
Popular vote	1,781,341	885,770
Percentage	66.6%	33.1%
- Baker: 50–60% 60–70% 70–80% 80–90% Gonzalez: 50–60% 60–70%
Governor before election
Charlie Baker
Republican
Elected Governor
Charlie Baker
Republican

One-term Republican incumbent Charlie Baker ran for re-election.

Former State Secretary of Administration and Finance Jay Gonzalez, environmentalist Bob Massie, and former Newton Mayor Setti Warren announced their candidacies for the Democratic nomination. Warren withdrew from the race, leaving only Gonzalez and Massie.

Baker won re-election.

Massachusetts Republican primary
Party	Candidate	Votes	%
Republican	Charlie Baker (incumbent)	174,126	63.78
Republican	Scott Lively	98,421	36.05
Write-in		464	0.17
Total votes		273,011	100.00

Massachusetts Democratic primary
Party	Candidate	Votes	%
Democratic	Jay Gonzalez	348,434	63.17
Democratic	Bob Massie	192,404	34.88
Write-in		10,742	1.95
Total votes		551,580	100.00

Massachusetts general election
Party	Candidate	Votes	%	±%
Republican	Charlie Baker (incumbent)	1,781,341	66.60%	+18.21
Democratic	Jay Gonzalez	885,770	33.12%	–13.42
Write-in		7,504	0.28%	+0.19
Total votes		2,674,615	100.00%	
Republican hold				

== Michigan ==
2018 Michigan gubernatorial election
- November 6, 2018
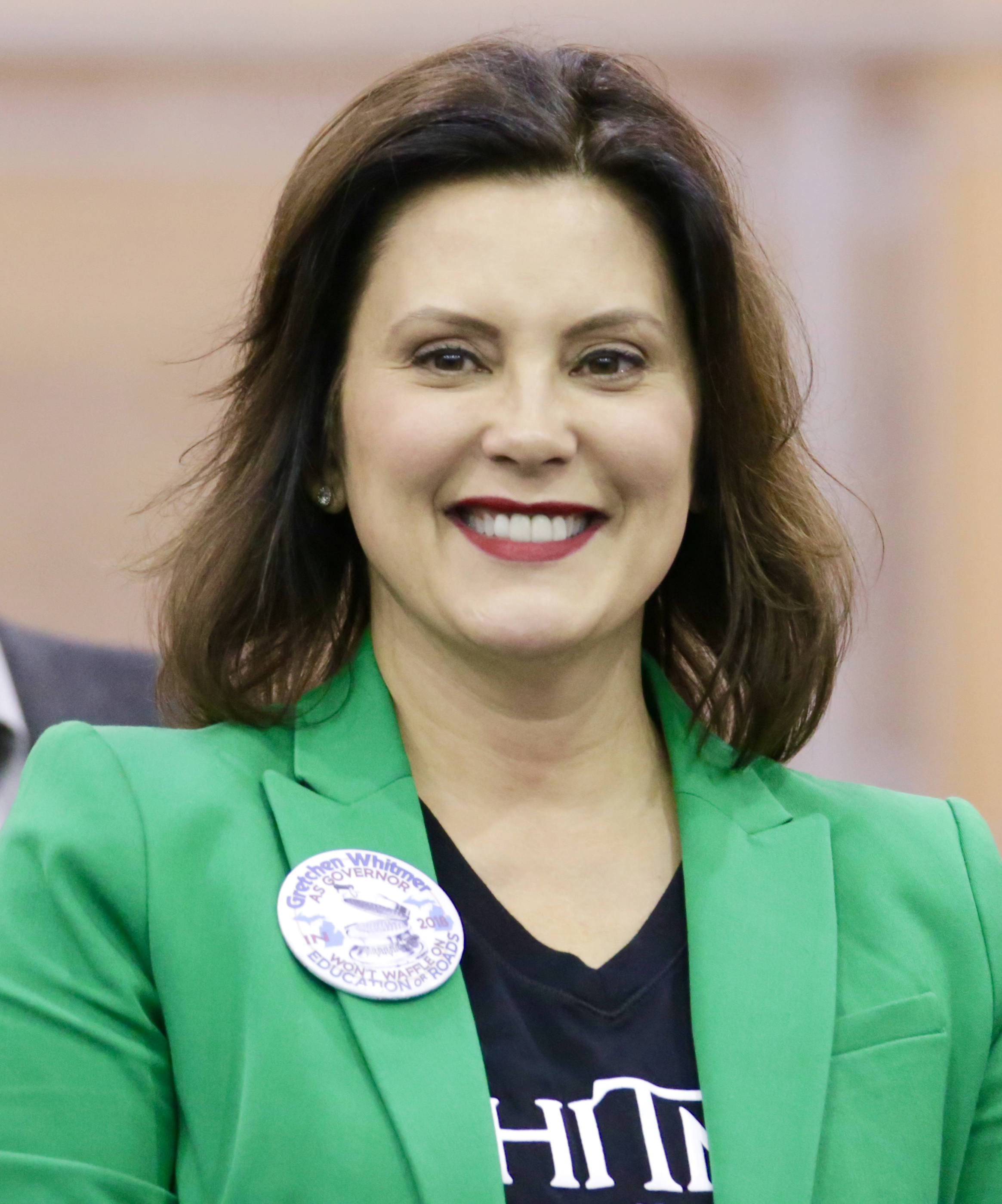

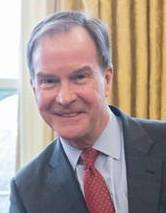
Nominee	Gretchen Whitmer	Bill Schuette
Party	Democratic	Republican
Running mate	Garlin Gilchrist	Lisa Posthumus Lyons
Popular vote	2,266,139	1,859,534
Percentage	53.3%	43.8%
- County results Whitmer: 40–50% 50–60% 60–70% 70–80% Schuette: 40–50% 50–60% 60–70% 70–80%
Governor before election
Rick Snyder
Republican
Elected Governor
Gretchen Whitmer
Democratic

Two-term Governor Rick Snyder was term-limited, as Michigan does not allow governors to serve more than two terms.

Attorney General Bill Schuette, Lieutenant Governor Brian Calley, state Senator Patrick Colbeck, and physician Jim Hines were seeking the Republican nomination.

Former state Senate Minority Leader Gretchen Whitmer, former executive director of the Detroit Department of Health and Wellness Promotion Abdul El-Sayed, and businessman Shri Thanedar were seeking the Democratic nomination.

Bill Gelineau and John Tatar were seeking the Libertarian nomination.

Whitmer won the election.

Michigan Republican primary
Party	Candidate	Votes	%
Republican	Bill Schuette	501,959	50.73
Republican	Brian Calley	249,185	25.18
Republican	Patrick Colbeck	129,646	13.10
Republican	Jim Hines	108,735	10.99
Total votes		989,525	100.00

Michigan Democratic primary
Party	Candidate	Votes	%
Democratic	Gretchen Whitmer	588,436	52.01
Democratic	Abdul El-Sayed	342,179	30.24
Democratic	Shri Thanedar	200,645	17.73
Total votes		1,131,447	100.00

Michigan general election
Party	Candidate	Votes	%	±%
Democratic	Gretchen Whitmer	2,266,193	53.31%	+6.45
Republican	Bill Schuette	1,859,534	43.75%	–7.17
Libertarian	Bill Gelineau	56,606	1.33%	+0.20
U.S. Taxpayers'	Todd Schleiger	29,219	0.69%	+0.08
Green	Jennifer Kurland	28,799	0.68%	+0.21
Natural Law	Keith Butkovich	10,202	0.24%	N/A
Write-in		32	0.00%	±0.00
Total votes		4,250,585	100.00%	
Democratic gain from Republican				

== Minnesota ==
2018 Minnesota gubernatorial election
- November 6, 2018
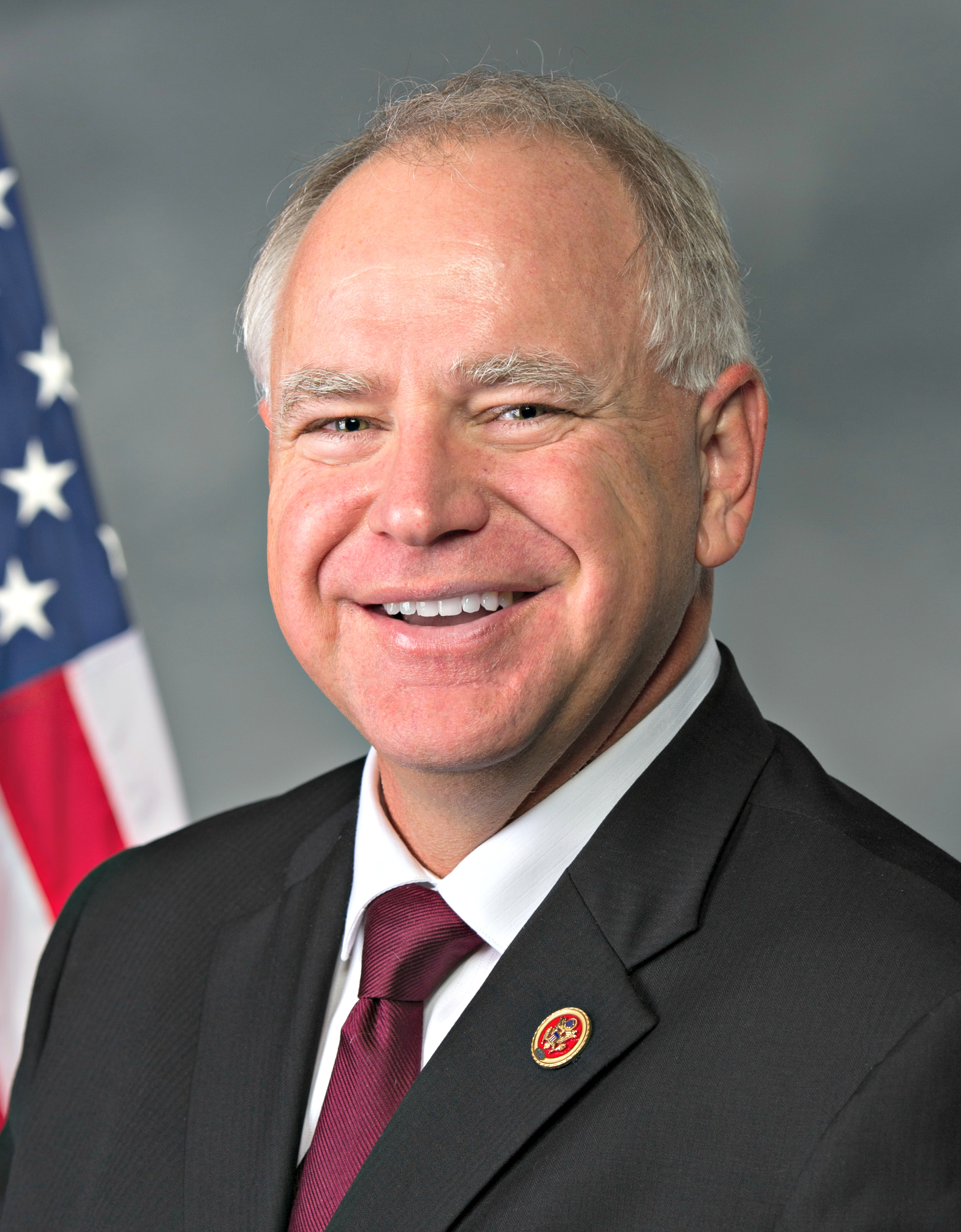

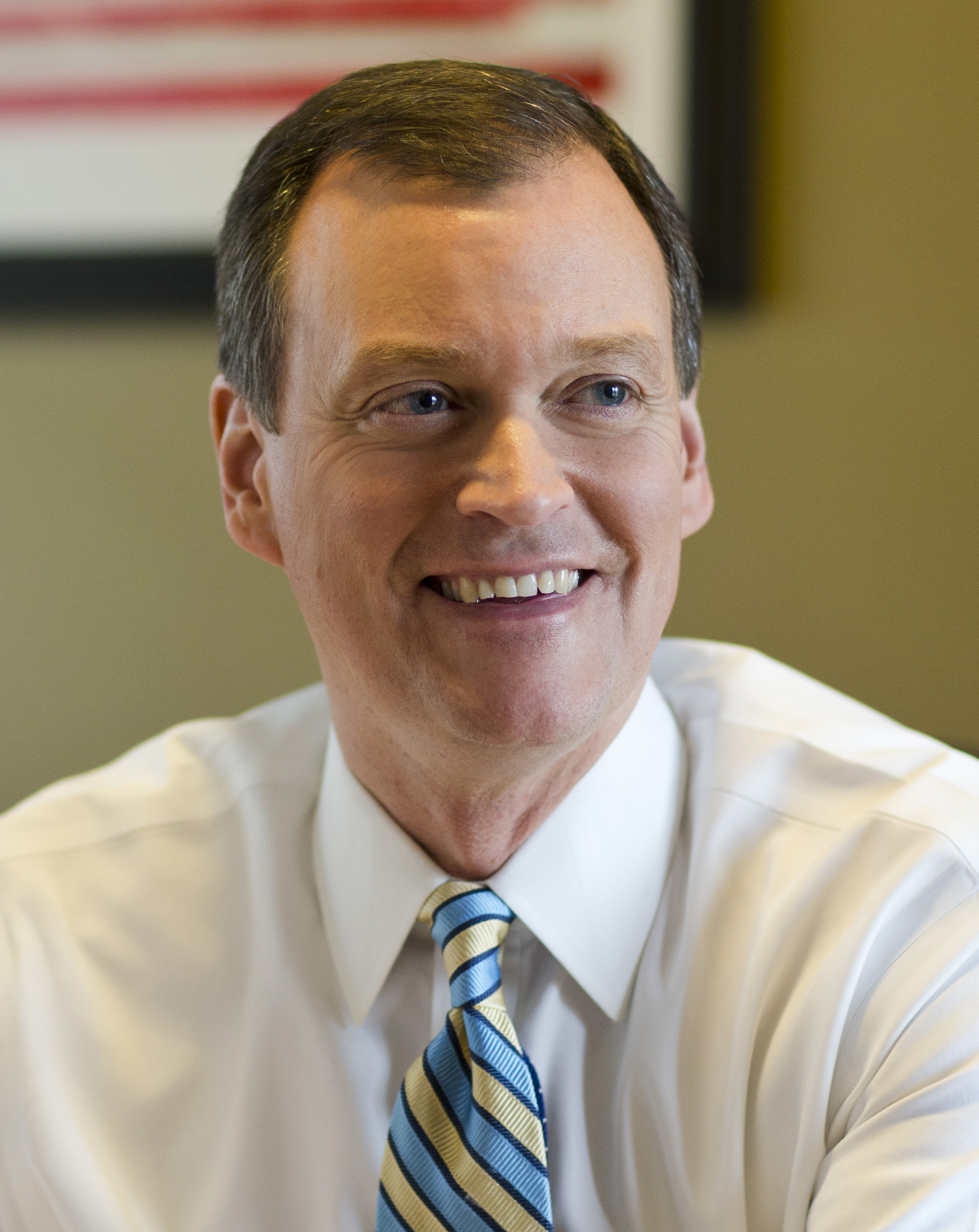
Nominee	Tim Walz	Jeff Johnson
Party	Democratic (DFL)	Republican
Running mate	Peggy Flanagan	Donna Bergstrom
Popular vote	1,393,096	1,097,705
Percentage	53.8%	42.4%
- Walz: 40–50% 50–60% 60–70% Tie: 40–50% Johnson: 40–50% 50–60% 60–70%
Governor before election
Mark Dayton
Democratic (DFL)
Elected Governor
Tim Walz
Democratic (DFL)

Two-term Governor Mark Dayton was eligible to seek re-election, but did not do so.

The Democratic-Farmer-Labor nominee was U.S. Representative Tim Walz. The Republican nominee was Hennepin County Commissioner and 2014 gubernatorial nominee Jeff Johnson.

Former Independence Party Governor Jesse Ventura expressed interest in running again, but ultimately declined.

Walz won the election.

Minnesota Democratic (DLF) primary
Party	Candidate	Votes	%
Democratic (DFL)	Tim Walz	242,832	41.60
Democratic (DFL)	Erin Murphy	186,969	32.03
Democratic (DFL)	Lori Swanson	143,517	24.59
Democratic (DFL)	Tim Holden	6,398	1.10
Democratic (DFL)	Olé Savior	4,019	0.69
Total votes		583,735	100.00

Minnesota Republican primary
Party	Candidate	Votes	%
Republican	Jeff Johnson	168,841	52.61
Republican	Tim Pawlenty	140,743	43.86
Republican	Mathew Kruse	11,330	3.53
Total votes		320,914	100.00

Minnesota general election
Party	Candidate	Votes	%	±%
Democratic (DFL)	Tim Walz	1,393,096	53.84%	+3.77
Republican	Jeff Johnson	1,097,705	42.43%	−2.08
Grassroots—LC	Chris Wright	68,667	2.65%	+1.07
Libertarian	Josh Welter	26,735	1.03%	+0.11
Write-in		1,084	0.04%	±0.00
Total votes		2,587,287	100.00%	
Democratic (DFL) hold				

== Nebraska ==
2018 Nebraska gubernatorial election
- November 6, 2018
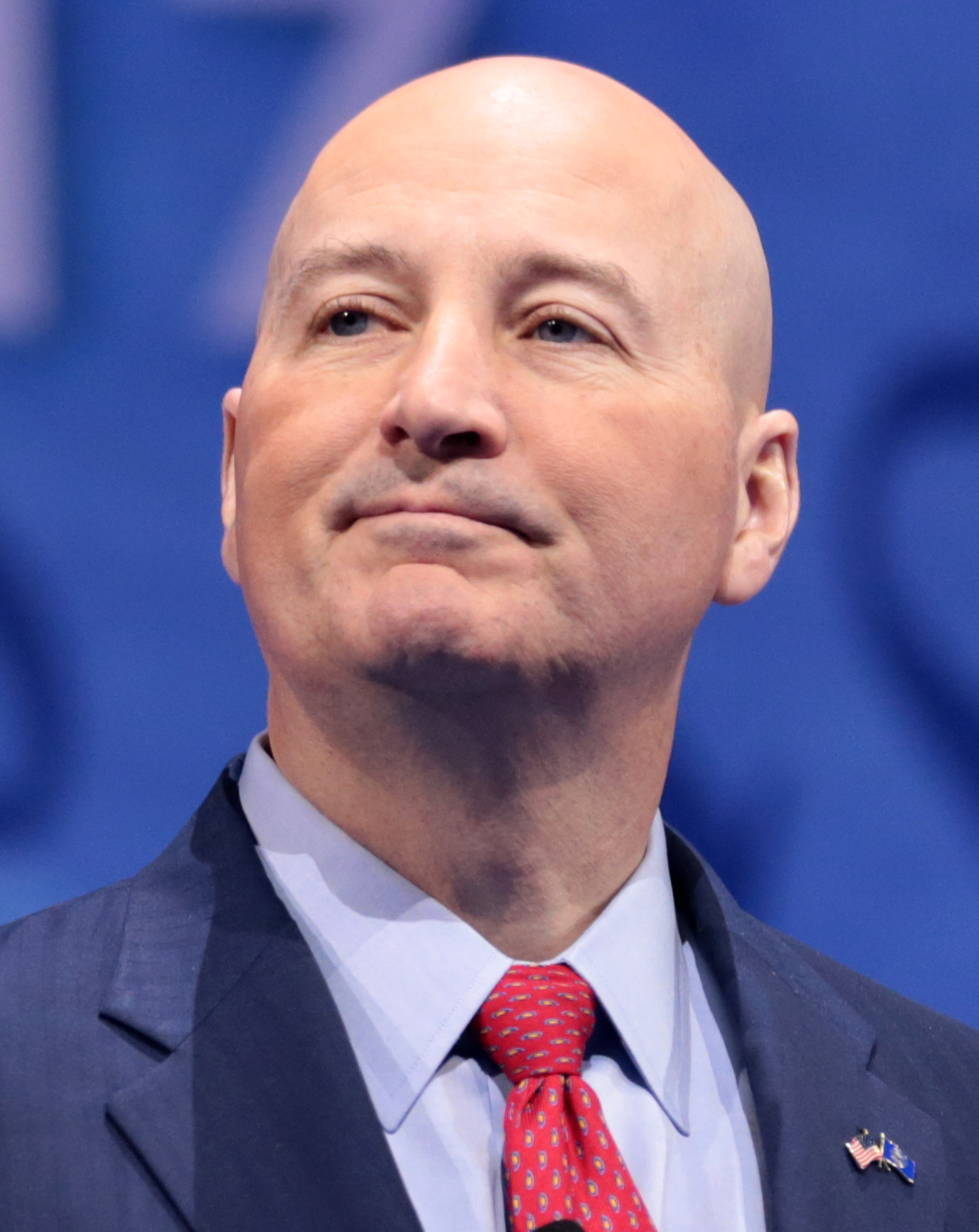

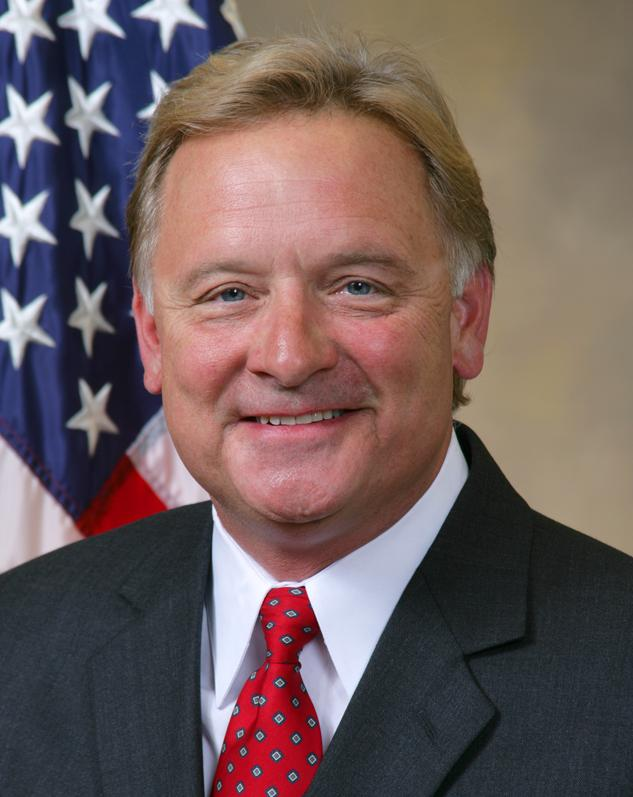
Nominee	Pete Ricketts	Bob Krist
Party	Republican	Democratic
Running mate	Mike Foley	Lynne Walz
Popular vote	411,812	286,169
Percentage	59.0%	41.0%
- County results Ricketts: 50–60% 60–70% 70–80% 80–90% >90% Krist: 50–60%
Governor before election
Pete Ricketts
Republican
Elected Governor
Pete Ricketts
Republican

One-term incumbent Pete Ricketts ran for re-election. Former governor Dave Heineman considered a primary challenge to Ricketts.

State Senator Bob Krist won the Democratic nomination. He intended to create a third party to run, but abandoned this plan.

Ricketts won re-election.

Nebraska Republican primary
Party	Candidate	Votes	%
Republican	Pete Ricketts (incumbent)	138,292	81.42
Republican	Krystal Gabel	31,568	18.58
Total votes		169,860	100.00

Nebraska Democratic primary
Party	Candidate	Votes	%
Democratic	Bob Krist	54,992	59.81
Democratic	Vanessa Gayle Ward	26,478	28.80
Democratic	Tyler Davis	10,472	11.39
Total votes		91,942	100.00

Nebraska general election
Party	Candidate	Votes	%	±%
Republican	Pete Ricketts (incumbent)	411,812	59.00%	+1.85
Democratic	Bob Krist	286,169	41.00%	+1.77
Total votes		697,981	100.00%	
Republican hold				

== Nevada ==
2018 Nevada gubernatorial election
- November 6, 2018
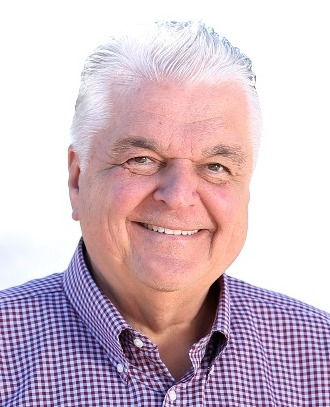

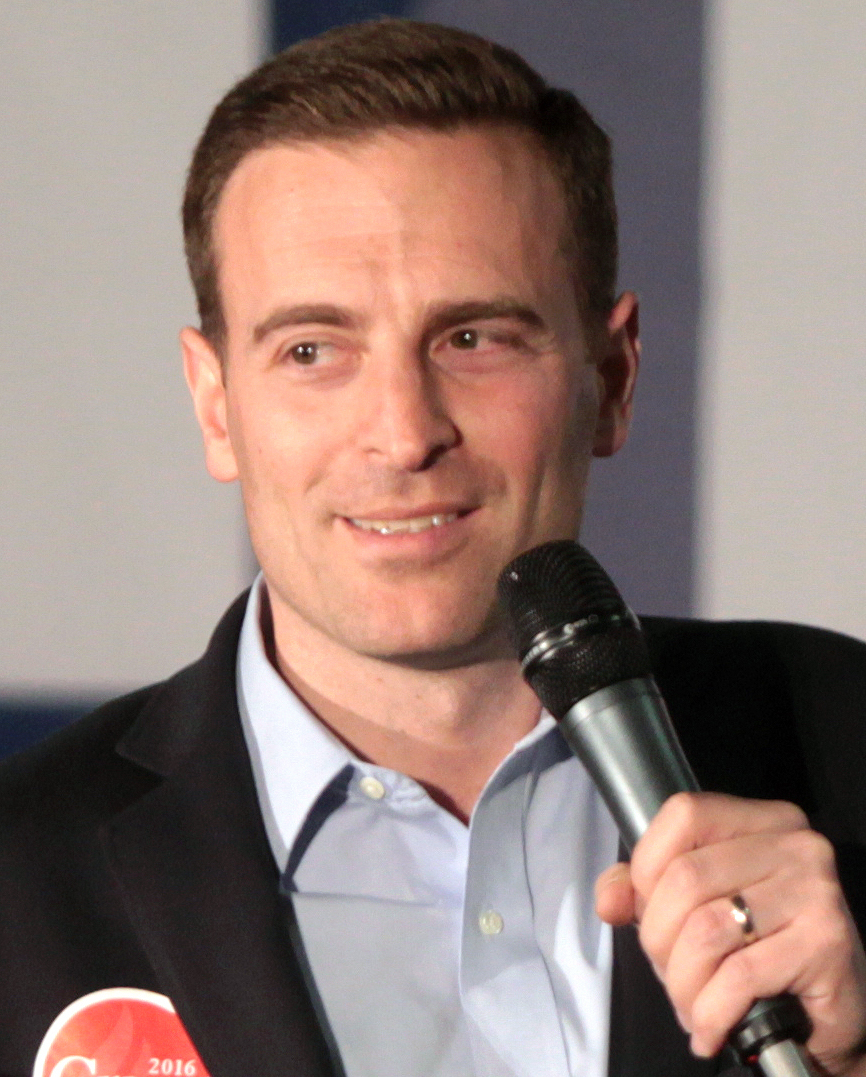
Nominee	Steve Sisolak	Adam Laxalt
Party	Democratic	Republican
Popular vote	480,007	440,320
Percentage	49.4%	45.3%
- County results Sisolak: 40–50% 50–60% Laxalt: 50–60% 60–70% 70–80% 80–90%
Governor before election
Brian Sandoval
Republican
Elected Governor
Steve Sisolak
Democratic

Two-term Governor Brian Sandoval was term-limited, as Nevada does not allow governors to serve more than two terms.

Attorney General Adam Laxalt and State Treasurer Dan Schwartz ran for the Republican nomination, which Laxalt won.

Clark County Commissioners Steve Sisolak and Chris Giunchigliani sought the Democratic nomination, which Sisolak won.

Sisolak won the election.

Nevada Republican primary
Party	Candidate	Votes	%
Republican	Adam Laxalt	101,651	71.64
Republican	Dan Schwartz	12,919	9.10
Republican	Jared Fisher	6,696	4.72
Republican	Stephanie Carlisle	6,401	4.51
None of These Candidates		6,136	4.32
Republican	William Boyd	6,028	4.25
Republican	Stan Lusak	1,011	0.71
Republican	Frederick Conquest	766	0.54
Republican	Edward Dundas	576	0.41
Total votes		141,884	100.00

Nevada Democratic primary
Party	Candidate	Votes	%
Democratic	Steve Sisolak	72,749	50.03
Democratic	Chris Giunchigliani	56,511	38.86
None of These Candidates		5,069	3.49
Democratic	John Bonaventura	4,351	2.99
Democratic	Henry Thorns	2,761	1.90
Democratic	David Jones	2,511	1.73
Democratic	Asheesh Dewan	1,468	1.01
Total votes		145,420	100.00

Nevada general election
Party	Candidate	Votes	%	±%
Democratic	Steve Sisolak	480,007	49.39%	+25.51
Republican	Adam Laxalt	440,320	45.31%	–25.27
None of These Candidates		18,865	1.94%	–0.94
Independent	Ryan Bundy	13,891	1.43%	N/A
Independent American	Russell Best	10,076	1.04%	–1.62
Libertarian	Jared Lord	8,640	0.89%	N/A
Total votes		971,799	100.00%	
Democratic gain from Republican				

== New Hampshire ==
2018 New Hampshire gubernatorial election
- November 6, 2018
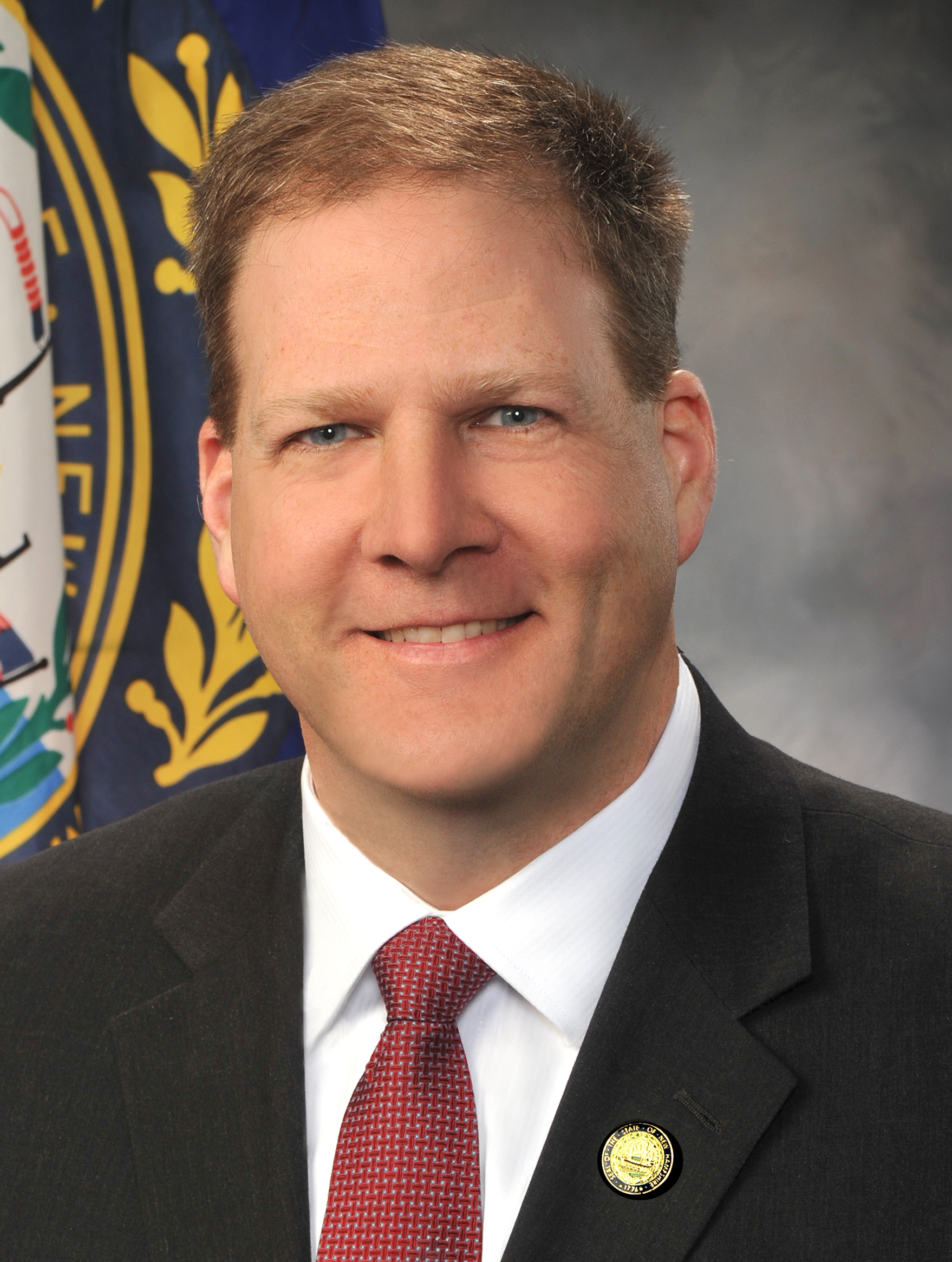

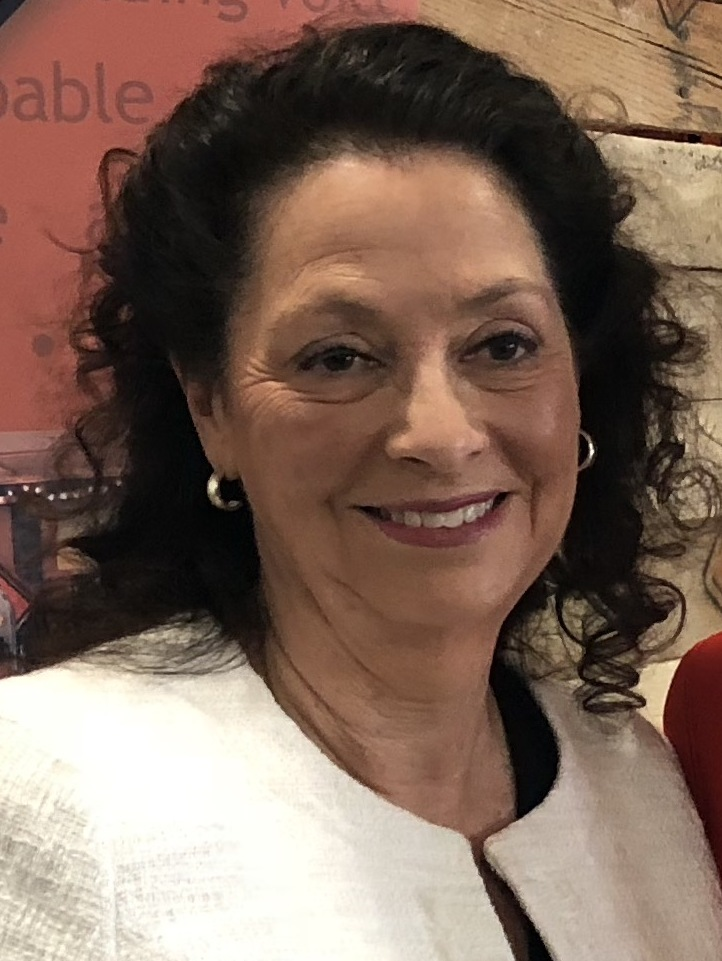
Nominee	Chris Sununu	Molly Kelly
Party	Republican	Democratic
Popular vote	302,764	262,359
Percentage	52.8%	45.8%
- County results Sununu: 50–60% 60–70% Kelly: 40–50% 50–60%
Governor before election
Chris Sununu
Republican
Elected Governor
Chris Sununu
Republican

Chris Sununu, who was elected in 2016 by a margin of two percent, sought re-election.

Former Portsmouth mayor and 2016 candidate Steve Marchand and former state senator Molly Kelly ran for the Democratic nomination. Kelly won the nomination.

Jilletta Jarvis sought the Libertarian nomination.

Sununu won re-election.

New Hampshire Republican primary
Party	Candidate	Votes	%
Republican	Chris Sununu (incumbent)	91,025	98.32
Write-in		1,558	1.68
Total votes		92,583	100.00

New Hampshire Democratic primary
Party	Candidate	Votes	%
Democratic	Molly Kelly	80,598	65.54
Democratic	Steve Marchand	41,612	33.84
Write-in		755	0.61
Total votes		122,965	100.00

New Hampshire general election
Party	Candidate	Votes	%	±%
Republican	Chris Sununu (incumbent)	302,764	52.78%	+3.94
Democratic	Molly Kelly	262,359	45.74%	–0.83
Libertarian	Jilletta Jarvis	8,197	1.43%	–2.88
Write-in		282	0.05%	–0.23
Total votes		573,602	100.00%	
Republican hold				

== New Mexico ==
2018 New Mexico gubernatorial election
- November 6, 2018
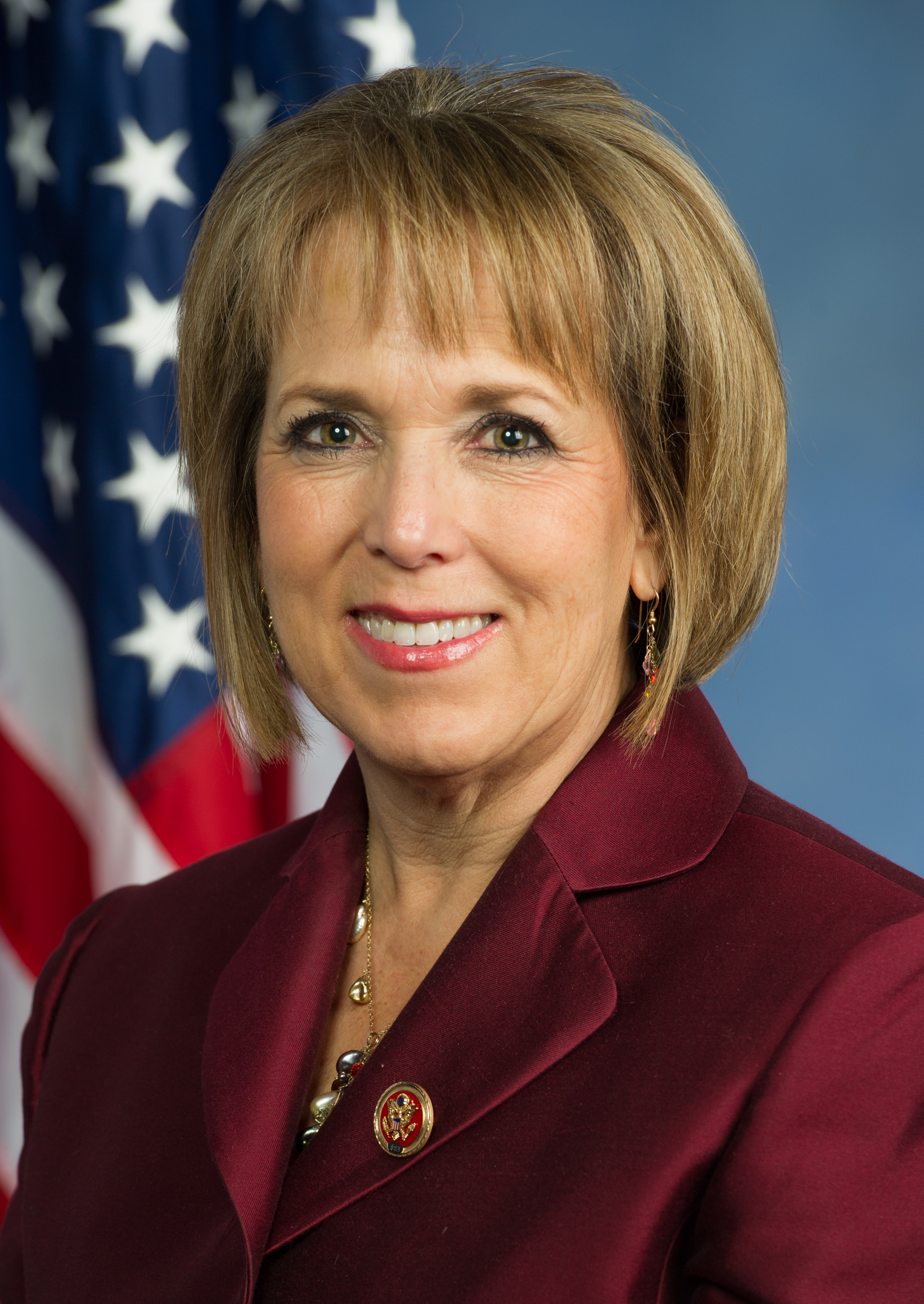

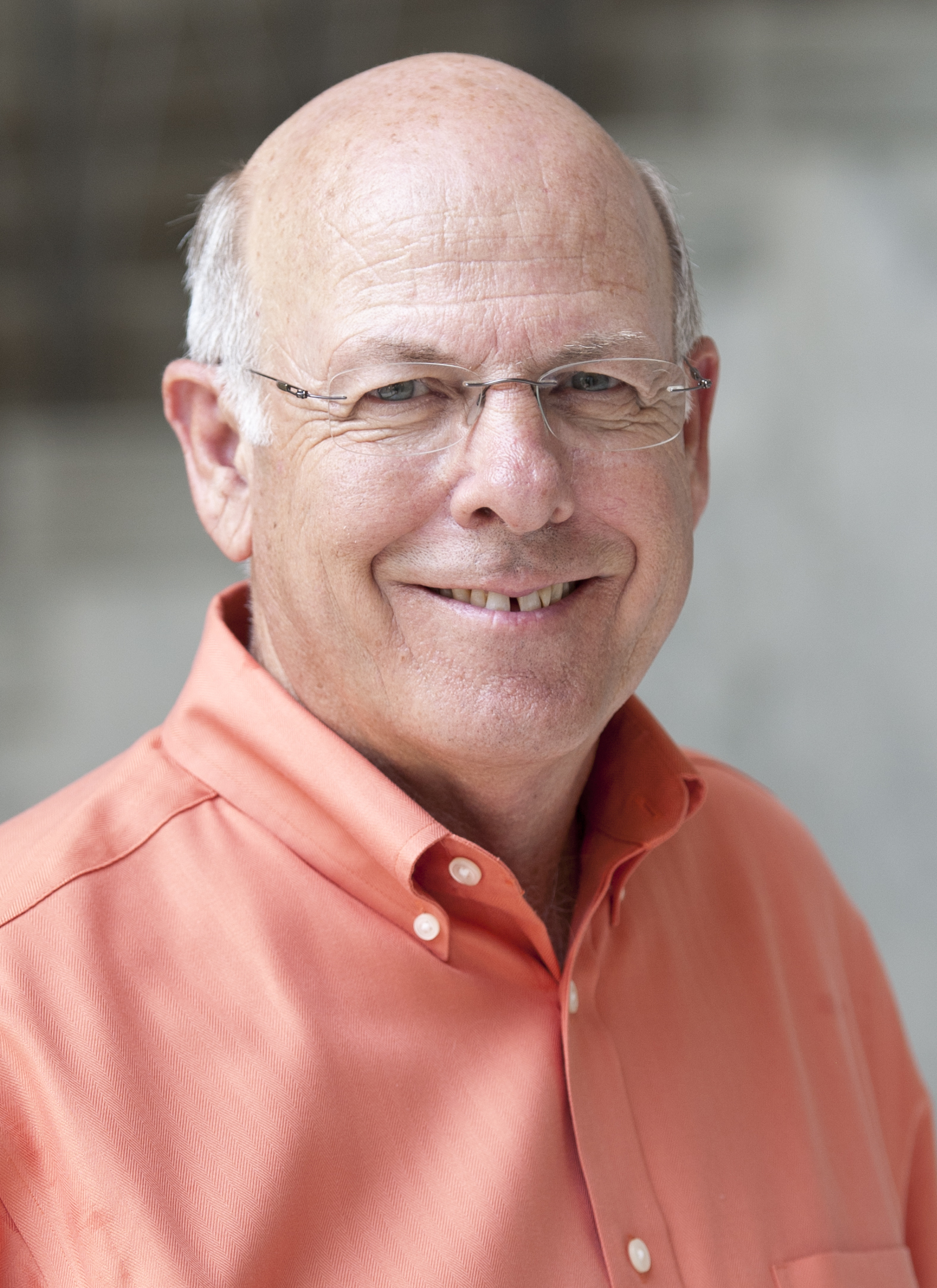
Nominee	Michelle Lujan Grisham	Steve Pearce
Party	Democratic	Republican
Running mate	Howie Morales	Michelle Garcia Holmes
Popular vote	398,368	298,091
Percentage	57.2%	42.8%
- County results Lujan Grisham: 50–60% 60–70% 70–80% 80–90% Pearce: 50–60% 60–70% 70–80%
Governor before election
Susana Martinez
Republican
Elected Governor
Michelle Lujan Grisham
Democratic

Two-term Governor Susana Martinez was term-limited, as New Mexico does not allow governors to serve three consecutive terms.

U.S. Representative Michelle Lujan Grisham faced U.S. Representative Steve Pearce in the general election.

Lujan Grisham won the election.

New Mexico Republican primary
Party	Candidate	Votes	%
Republican	Steve Pearce	74,705	100.00
Total votes		74,705	100.00

New Mexico Democratic primary
Party	Candidate	Votes	%
Democratic	Michelle Lujan Grisham	116,311	66.39
Democratic	Jeff Apodaca	38,779	22.14
Democratic	Joe Cervantes	20,092	11.47
Total votes		175,182	100.00

New Mexico general election
Party	Candidate	Votes	%	±%
Democratic	Michelle Lujan Grisham	398,368	57.20%	+14.42
Republican	Steve Pearce	298,091	42.80%	–14.42
Total votes		696,459	100.00%	
Democratic gain from Republican				

== New York ==
2018 New York gubernatorial election
- November 6, 2018
- Turnout: 48.0%
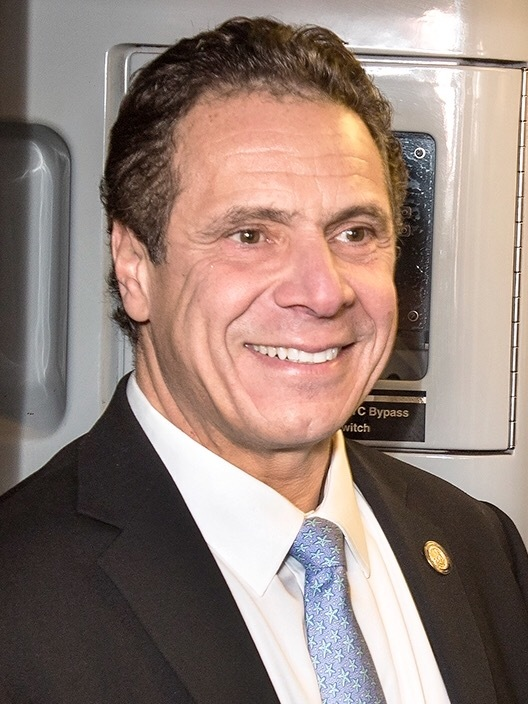

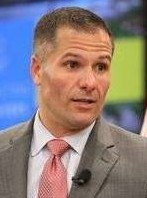
Nominee	Andrew Cuomo	Marc Molinaro
Party	Democratic	Republican
Alliance	Parties: Independence; Women's Equality; Working Families	Parties: Conservative; Reform
Running mate	Kathy Hochul	Julie Killian
Popular vote	3,635,340	2,207,602
Percentage	59.6%	36.2%
- County results Cuomo: 40–50% 50–60% 60–70% 70–80% 80–90% >90% Molinaro: 40–50% 50–60% 60–70% 70–80%
Governor before election
Andrew Cuomo
Democratic
Elected Governor
Andrew Cuomo
Democratic

Two-term Governor Andrew Cuomo ran for re-election, as New York does not have gubernatorial term limits.

Actress and activist Cynthia Nixon challenged Cuomo for the Democratic Party nomination, but did not win.

Dutchess County Executive Marcus Molinaro was the Republican nominee.

Libertarian Larry Sharpe was the first opponent to declare his candidacy in the race, declaring his candidacy on July 12, 2017 – and won the Libertarian nomination for governor.

Cuomo won re-election.

New York Democratic primary
Party	Candidate	Votes	%
Democratic	Andrew Cuomo (incumbent)	1,021,160	65.53
Democratic	Cynthia Nixon	537,192	34.47
Total votes		1,558,352	100.00

New York general election
Party	Candidate	Votes	%	±%
Democratic	Andrew Cuomo	3,424,416	56.16%	+8.64
Working Families	Andrew Cuomo	114,478	1.88%	–1.43
Independence	Andrew Cuomo	68,713	1.13%	–0.91
Women's Equality	Andrew Cuomo	27,733	0.45%	+0.96
Total	Andrew Cuomo (incumbent)	3,635,340	59.62%	+5.34
Republican	Marc Molinaro	1,926,485	31.60%	–0.79
Conservative	Marc Molinaro	253,624	4.16%	–2.41
Reform	Marc Molinaro	27,493	0.45%	N/A
Total	Marc Molinaro	2,207,602	36.21%	–4.10
Green	Howie Hawkins	103,946	1.70%	–3.14
Libertarian	Larry Sharpe	95,033	1.56%	+1.12
SAM	Stephanie Miner	55,441	0.91%	N/A
Total votes		6,097,362	100.00%	
Democratic hold				

== Ohio ==
2018 Ohio gubernatorial election
- November 6, 2018
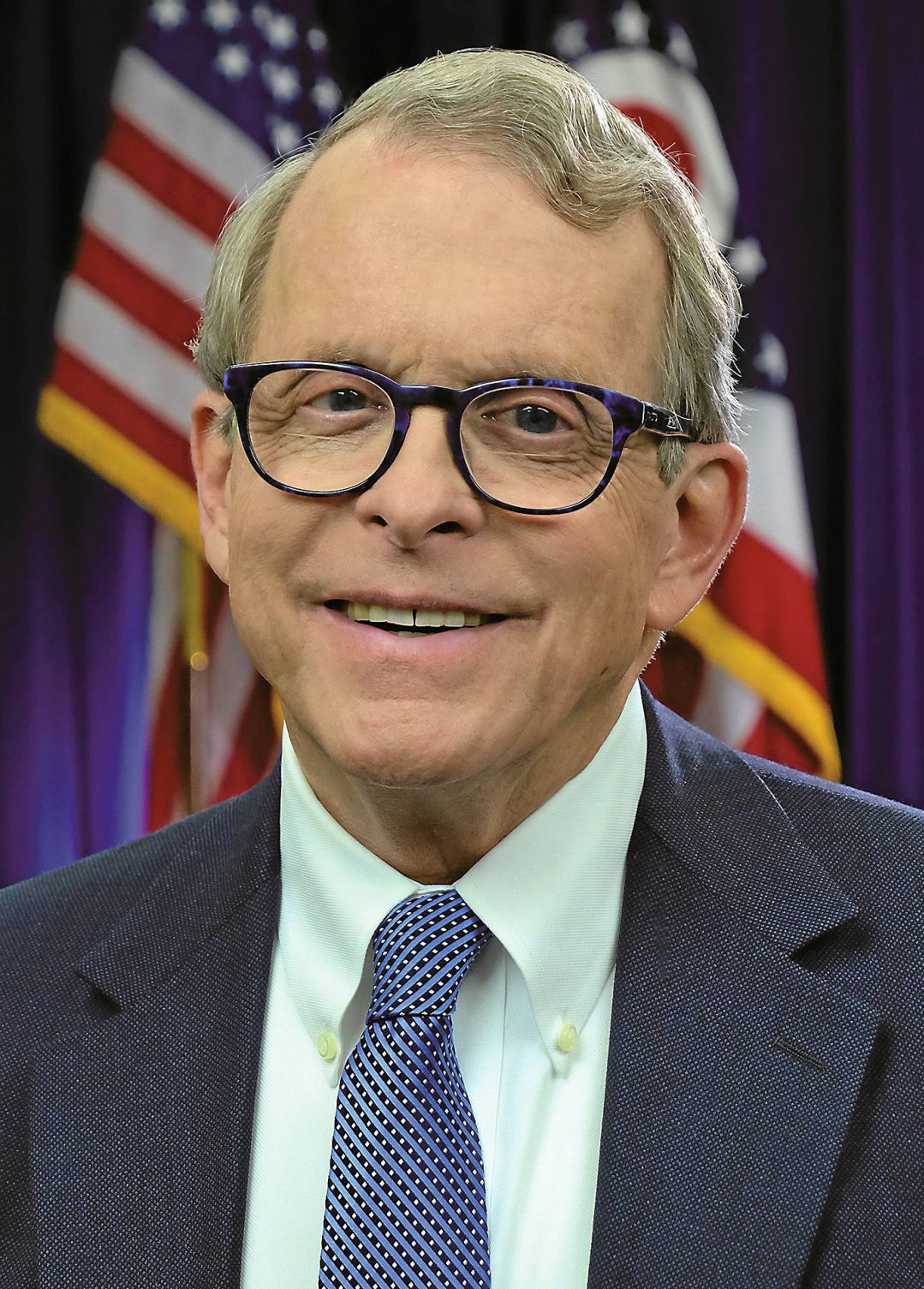

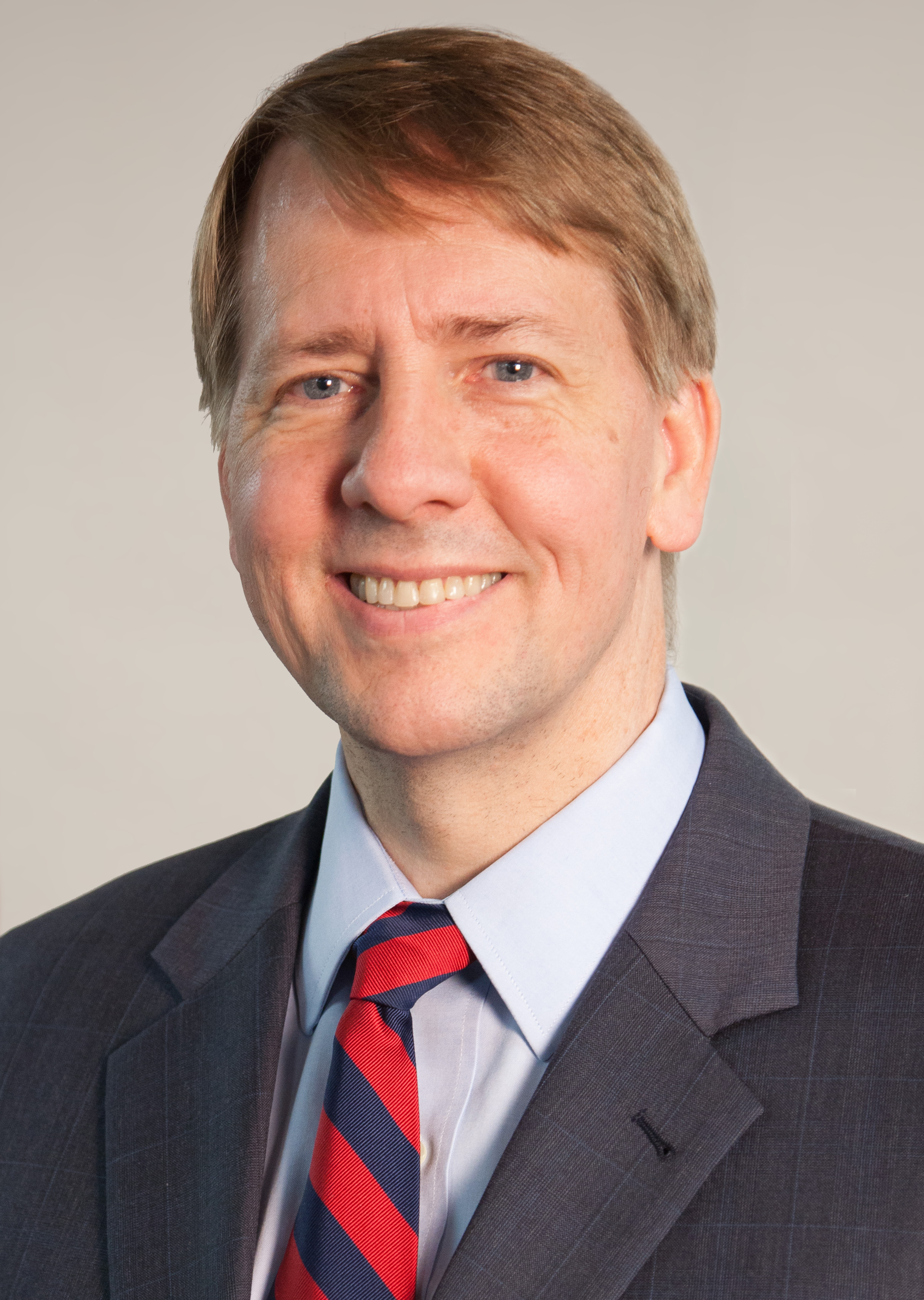
Nominee	Mike DeWine	Richard Cordray
Party	Republican	Democratic
Running mate	Jon Husted	Betty Sutton
Popular vote	2,235,825	2,070,046
Percentage	50.4%	46.7%
- County Results; DeWine: 40-50% 50-60% 60-70% 70-80% Cordray: 50–60% 60–70%
Governor before election
John Kasich
Republican
Elected Governor
Mike DeWine
Republican

Two-term Governor John Kasich was term-limited, as Ohio does not allow governors to serve three consecutive terms.

Attorney General Mike DeWine and Lieutenant Governor Mary Taylor ran for the Republican nomination, which DeWine won.

Former U.S. Representative and two-time presidential candidate Dennis Kucinich, Ohio Attorney General and Consumer Financial Protection Bureau director Richard Cordray, and state Senator Joe Schiavoni ran for the Democratic nomination, which was won by Cordray.

Green Party nominee for State House in 2016 Constance Gadell-Newton declared her candidacy.

Filmmaker and comedian Travis Irvine was the Libertarian Party's candidate for governor.

DeWine won the election.

Ohio Republican primary
Party	Candidate	Votes	%
Republican	Mike DeWine	494,766	59.82
Republican	Mary Taylor	332,273	40.18
Total votes		827,039	100.00

Ohio Democratic primary
Party	Candidate	Votes	%
Democratic	Richard Cordray	423,264	62.27
Democratic	Dennis Kucinich	155,694	22.90
Democratic	Joe Schiavoni	62,315	9.17
Democratic	Bill O'Neill	22,196	3.26
Democratic	Paul Ray	9,373	1.38
Democratic	Larry Ealy	6,896	1.01
Total votes		679,738	100.00

Ohio general election
Party	Candidate	Votes	%	±%
Republican	Mike DeWine	2,235,825	50.39%	–13.25
Democratic	Richard Cordray	2,070,046	46.68%	+13.65
Libertarian	Travis Irvine	79,985	1.81%	N/A
Green	Constance Gadell-Newton	49,475	1.12%	–2.21
Write-in		358	0.01%	N/A
Total votes		4,429,582	100.00%	
Republican hold				

== Oklahoma ==
2018 Oklahoma gubernatorial election
- November 6, 2018
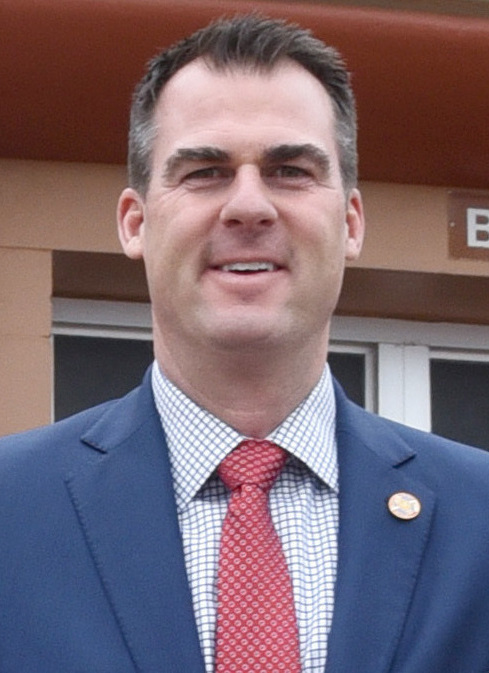

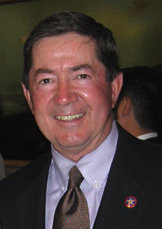
Nominee	Kevin Stitt	Drew Edmondson
Party	Republican	Democratic
Popular vote	644,579	500,973
Percentage	54.3%	42.2%
- County results Stitt: 40–50% 50–60% 60–70% 70–80% 80–90% Edmondson: 40–50% 50–60%
Governor before election
Mary Fallin
Republican
Elected Governor
Kevin Stitt
Republican

Two-term Governor Mary Fallin was term-limited as Oklahoma does not allow governors to serve more than two terms.

Businessman Kevin Stitt advanced to a runoff in the Republican primary, eventually winning.

With only one opponent in the primary, former Attorney General Drew Edmondson won the Democratic nomination outright.

The Libertarian nominee was Chris Powell.

Stitt won the general election.

Oklahoma Republican primary
Party	Candidate	Votes	%
Republican	Mick Cornett	132,806	29.34
Republican	Kevin Stitt	110,479	24.41
Republican	Todd Lamb	107,985	23.86
Republican	Dan Fisher	35,818	7.91
Republican	Gary Jones	25,243	5.58
Republican	Gary Richardson	18,185	4.02
Republican	Blake Stephens	12,211	2.70
Republican	Christopher Barnett	5,240	1.16
Republican	Barry Gowdy	2,347	0.52
Republican	Eric Foutch	2,292	0.51
Total votes		452,606	100.00

Oklahoma Republican primary runoff
Party	Candidate	Votes	%
Republican	Kevin Stitt	164,892	54.56
Republican	Mick Cornett	137,316	45.44
Total votes		302,208	100.00

Democratic primary results
Party	Candidate	Votes	%
Democratic	Drew Edmondson	242,764	61.38
Democratic	Connie Johnson	152,730	38.62
Total votes		395,494	100.00

Oklahoma general election
Party	Candidate	Votes	%	±%
Republican	Kevin Stitt	644,579	54.33%	–1.47
Democratic	Drew Edmondson	500,973	42.23%	+1.22
Libertarian	Chris Powell	40,833	3.44%	N/A
Total votes		1,186,385	100.00%	
Republican hold				

== Oregon ==
2018 Oregon gubernatorial election
- November 6, 2018
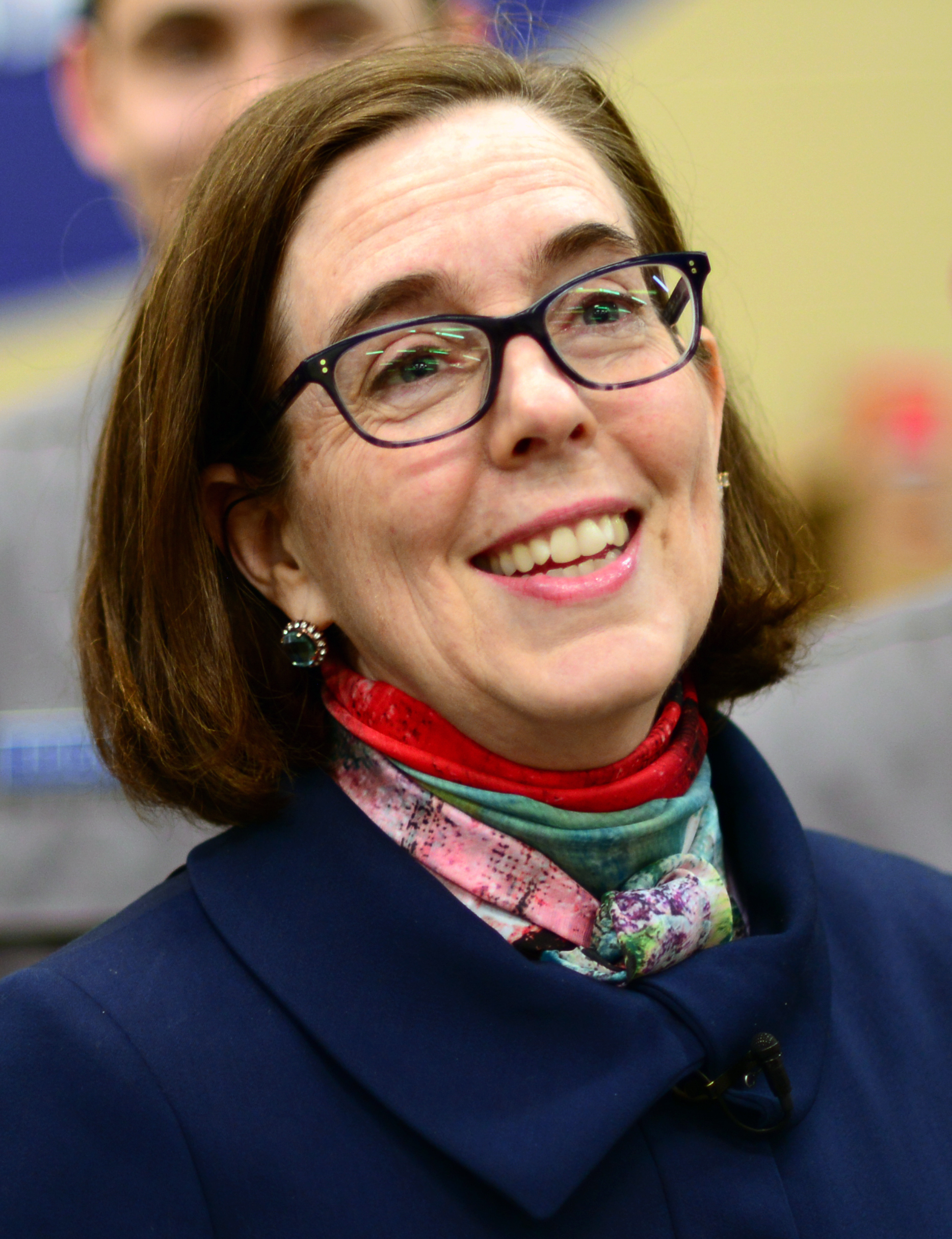

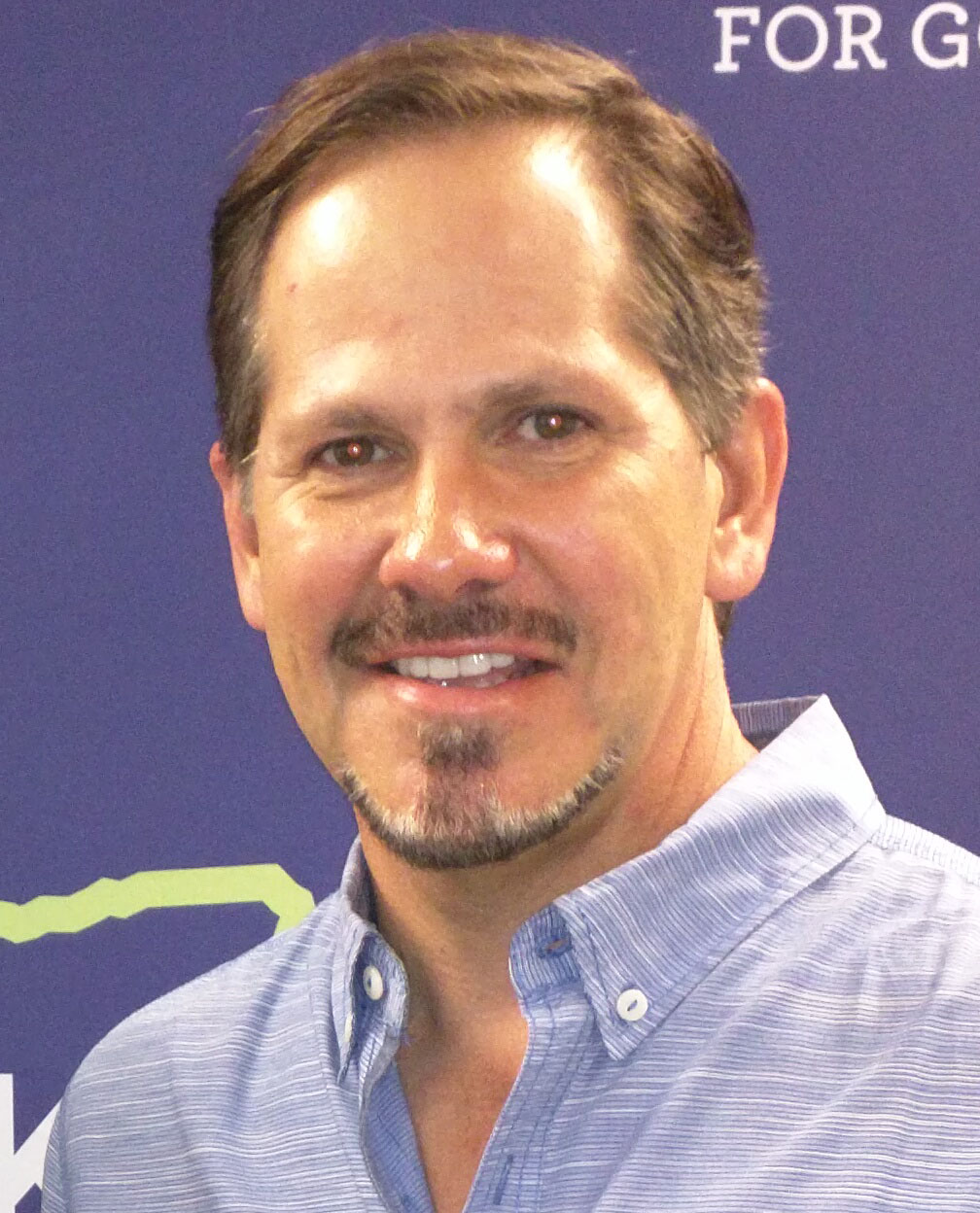
Nominee	Kate Brown	Knute Buehler
Party	Democratic	Republican
Popular vote	934,498	814,988
Percentage	50.1%	43.7%
- County results Brown: 40-50% 50–60% 60–70% 70–80% Buehler: 40–50% 50–60% 60–70% 70–80%
Governor before election
Kate Brown
Democratic
Elected Governor
Kate Brown
Democratic

Kate Brown became governor of Oregon in February 2015 following the resignation of John Kitzhaber. In accordance with Oregon law, a special election was held in 2016, which Brown won. She ran for a full term and won the primary.

State Representative Knute Buehler won the Republican nomination.

Brown won election to a full term.

Oregon Democratic primary
Party	Candidate	Votes	%
Democratic	Kate Brown (incumbent)	324,541	81.95
Democratic	Ed Jones	33,464	8.45
Democratic	Candace Neville	29,110	7.35
Write-in		8,912	2.25
Total votes		396,027	100.00

Oregon Republican primary
Party	Candidate	Votes	%
Republican	Knute Buehler	144,103	45.89
Republican	Sam Carpenter	90,572	28.85
Republican	Greg C. Wooldridge	63,049	20.08
Republican	Bruce Cuff	4,857	1.55
Republican	Jeff Smith	4,691	1.49
Republican	David Stauffer	2,096	0.67
Republican	Jonathan Edwards III	861	0.27
Republican	Keenan Bohach	787	0.25
Republican	Brett Hyland	755	0.24
Republican	Jack W. Tacy	512	0.16
Write-in		1,701	0.54
Total votes		313,984	100.00

Oregon general election
Party	Candidate	Votes	%	±%
Democratic	Kate Brown (incumbent)	934,498	50.05%	–0.57
Republican	Knute Buehler	814,988	43.65%	+0.20
Independent Party	Patrick Starnes	53,392	2.86%	+0.42
Libertarian	Nick Chen	28,927	1.55%	–0.77
Constitution	Aaron Auer	21,145	1.13%	+0.13
Progressive	Chris Henry	11,013	0.59%	N/A
Write-in		3,034	0.16%	–0.01
Total votes		1,866,997	100.00%	
Democratic hold				

== Pennsylvania ==
2018 Pennsylvania gubernatorial election
- November 6, 2018
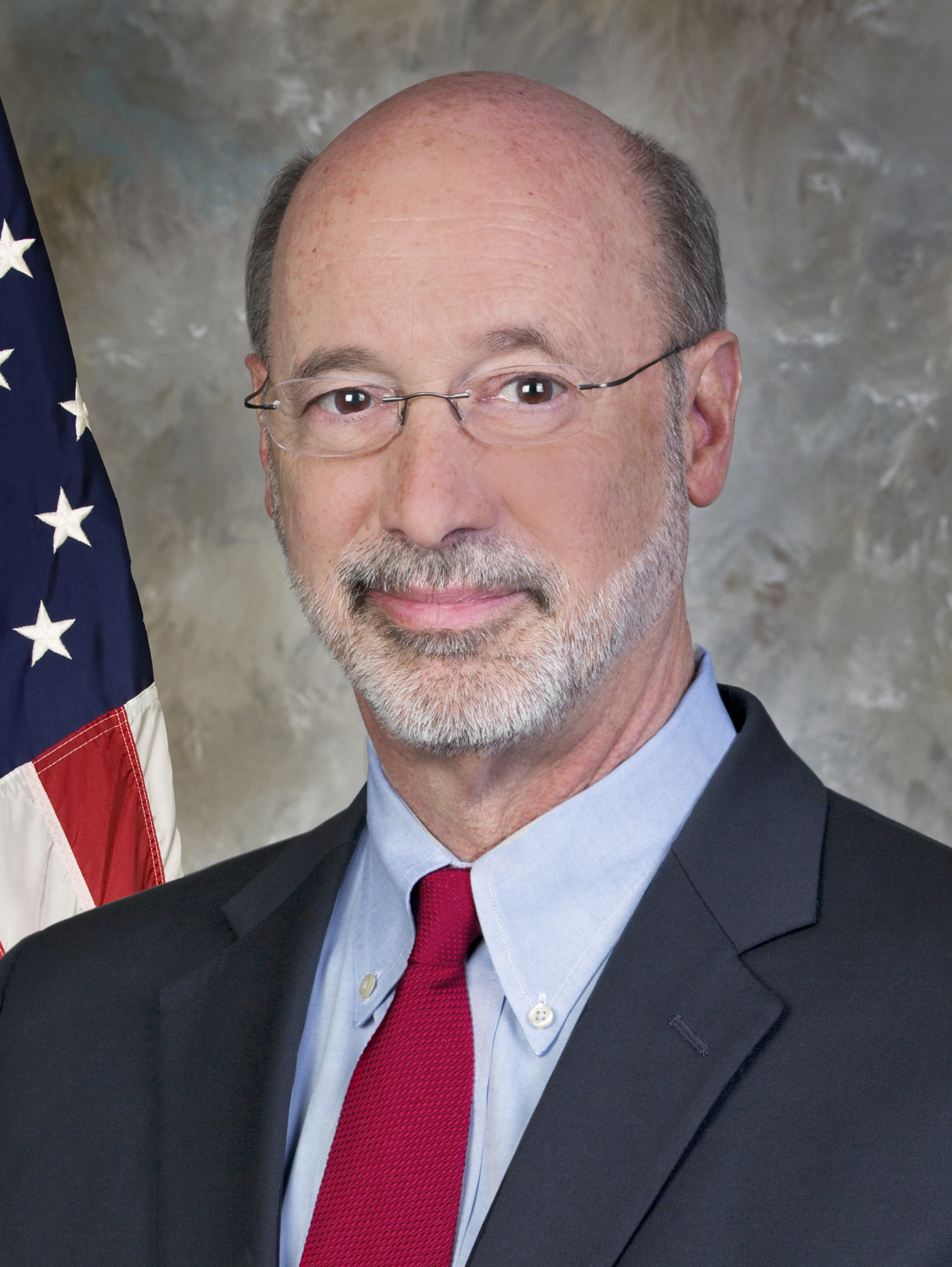

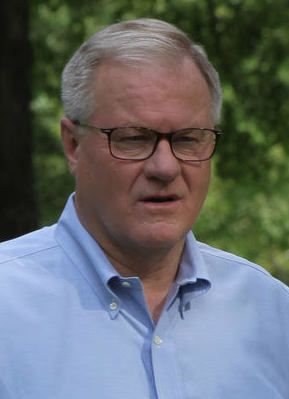
Nominee	Tom Wolf	Scott Wagner
Party	Democratic	Republican
Running mate	John Fetterman	Jeff Bartos
Popular vote	2,895,662	2,039,899
Percentage	57.8%	40.7%
- County results Wolf: 50–60% 60–70% 80–90% Wagner: 40–50% 50–60% 60–70% 70–80%
Governor before election
Tom Wolf
Democratic
Elected Governor
Tom Wolf
Democratic

One-term Governor Tom Wolf was eligible for re-election and was unopposed in the primary.

State Senator Scott Wagner won the Republican nomination.

Ken Krawchuk ran as a Libertarian.

Wolf won re-election.

Pennsylvania Democratic primary
Party	Candidate	Votes	%
Democratic	Tom Wolf (incumbent)	741,676	100.0
Total votes		741,676	100.00

Pennsylvania Republican primary
Party	Candidate	Votes	%
Republican	Scott Wagner	324,013	44.28
Republican	Paul Mango	270,014	36.90
Republican	Laura Ellsworth	137,650	18.81
Total votes		731,677	100.00

Pennsylvania general election
Party	Candidate	Votes	%	±%
Democratic	Tom Wolf (incumbent)	2,895,652	57.77%	+2.84
Republican	Scott Wagner	2,039,882	40.70%	–4.37
Libertarian	Ken Krawchuk	49,229	0.98%	N/A
Green	Paul Glover	27,792	0.55%	N/A
Total votes		5,012,555	100.00%	
Democratic hold				

== Rhode Island ==
2018 Rhode Island gubernatorial election
- November 6, 2018
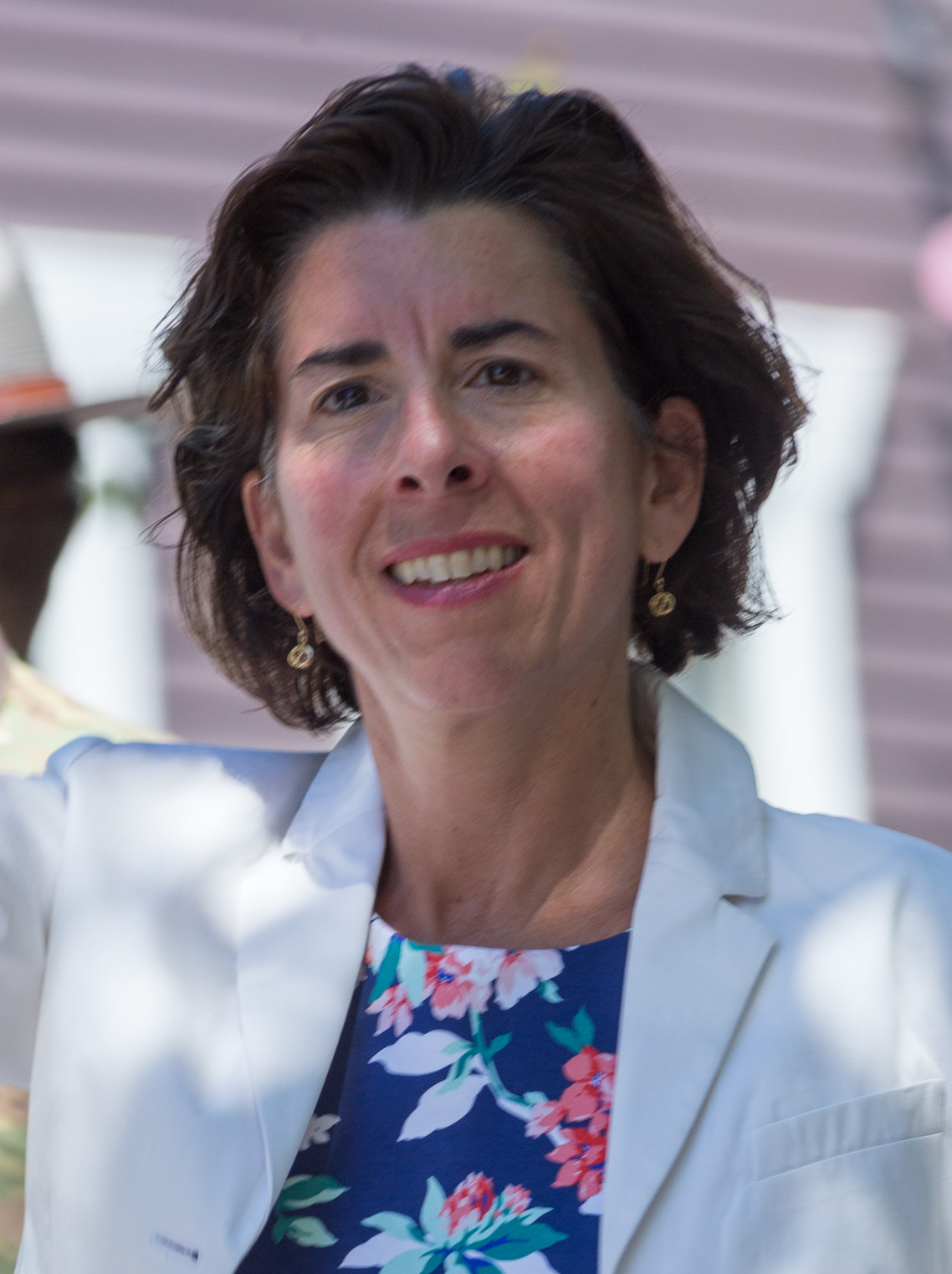

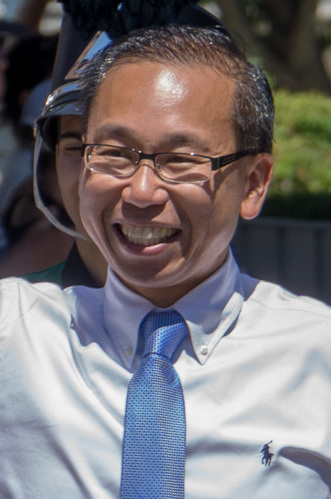
Nominee	Gina Raimondo	Allan Fung
Party	Democratic	Republican
Popular vote	198,122	139,932
Percentage	52.6%	37.2%
- County results Raimondo: 50–60% Fung: 40–50%
Governor before election
Gina Raimondo
Democratic
Elected Governor
Gina Raimondo
Democratic

First-term Governor Gina Raimondo ran for re-election.

Raimondo won re-election.

Rhode Island Democratic primary
Party	Candidate	Votes	%
Democratic	Gina Raimondo (incumbent)	66,978	57.15
Democratic	Matt Brown	39,300	33.53
Democratic	Spencer Dickinson	10,926	9.32
Total votes		117,204	100.00

Rhode Island Republican primary
Party	Candidate	Votes	%
Republican	Allan Fung	18,577	56.41
Republican	Patricia Morgan	13,208	40.11
Republican	Giovanni Feroce	1,147	3.48
Total votes		32,932	100.00

Rhode Island general election
Party	Candidate	Votes	%	±%
Democratic	Gina Raimondo (incumbent)	198,122	52.64%	+11.94
Republican	Allan Fung	139,932	37.18%	+0.94
Independent	Joe Trillo	16,532	4.39%	N/A
Moderate	Bill Gilbert	10,155	2.70%	–18.68
Independent	Luis-Daniel Munoz	6,223	1.65%	N/A
Compassion	Anne Armstrong	4,191	1.11%	N/A
Write-in		1,246	0.33%	+0.10
Total votes		376,401	100.00%	
Democratic hold				

== South Carolina ==
2018 South Carolina gubernatorial election
- November 6, 2018
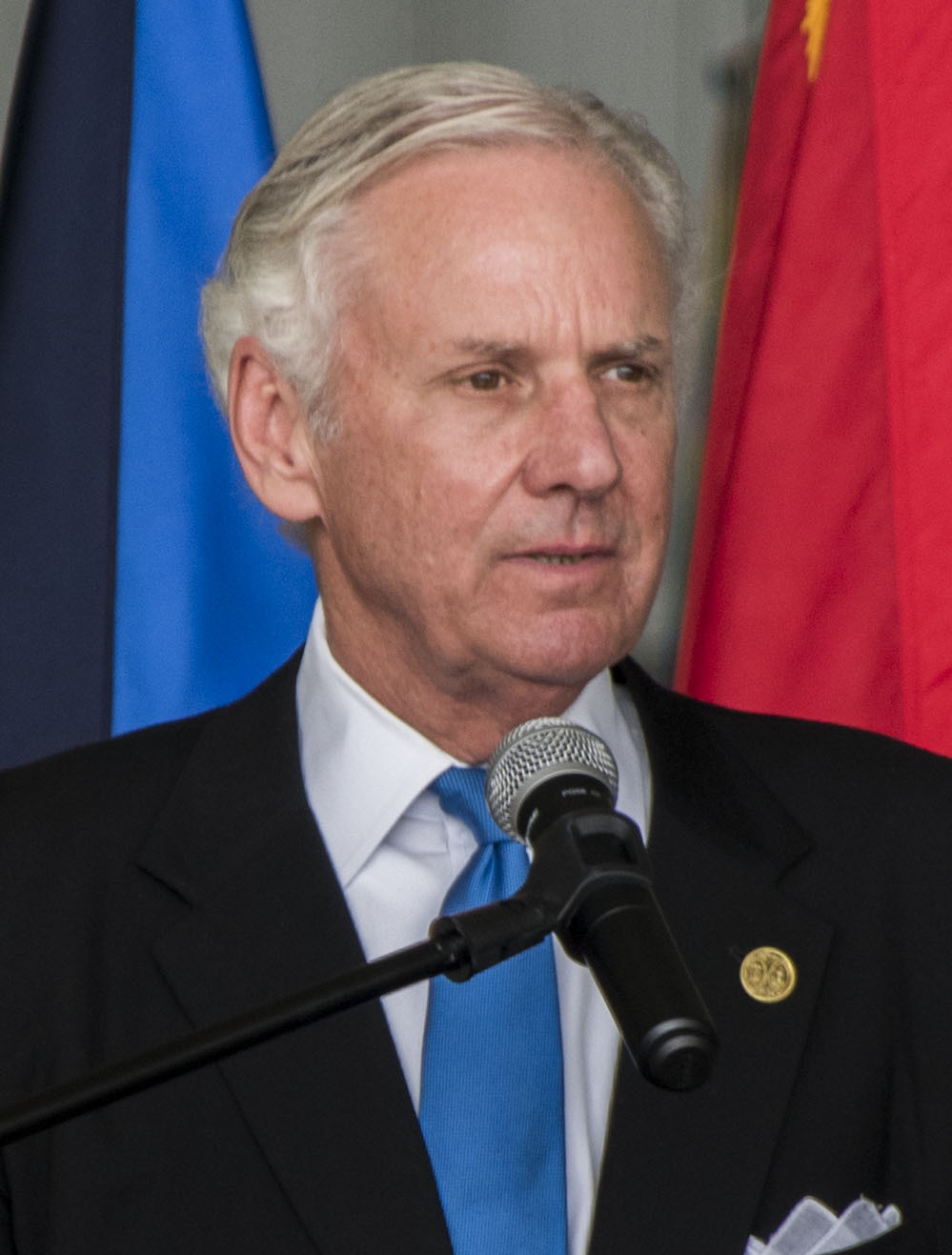

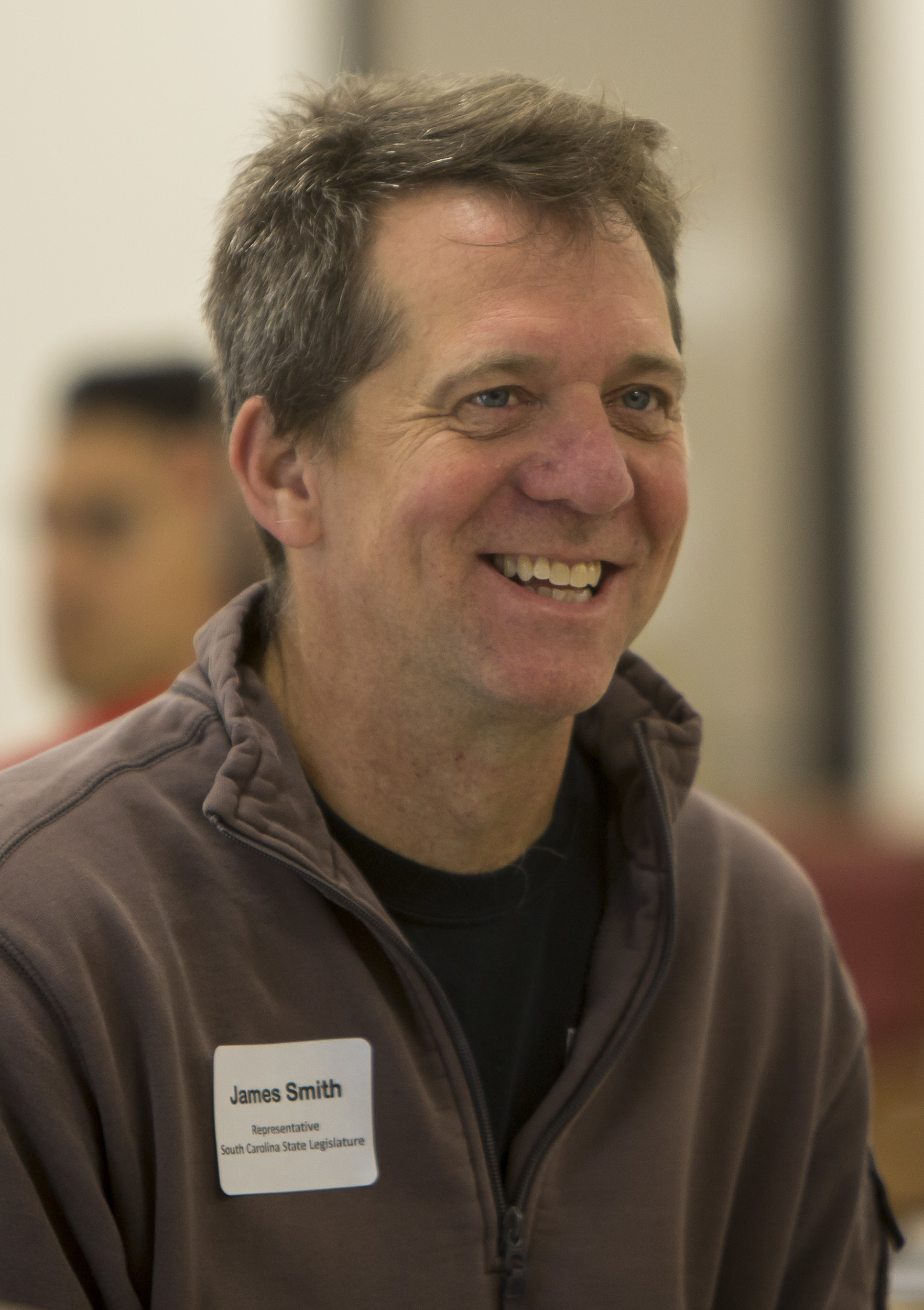
Nominee	Henry McMaster	James Smith
Party	Republican	Democratic
Running mate	Pamela Evette	Mandy Powers Norrell
Popular vote	921,342	784,182
Percentage	54.0%	45.9%
- County Results; McMaster: 50-60% 60-70% 70-80% Smith: 50–60% 60–70% 70–80%
Governor before election
Henry McMaster
Republican
Elected Governor
Henry McMaster
Republican

Henry McMaster succeeded Nikki Haley in January 2017 after she was confirmed as the U.S. Ambassador to the United Nations. McMaster sought election to a full term in 2018.

No candidate won a majority in the June 12 Republican primary. Hence, the top two finishers, McMaster and John Warren, competed in a runoff, which McMaster won.

State Representative James E. Smith Jr. won the Democratic primary outright.

McMaster won election to a full term.

South Carolina Republican primary
Party	Candidate	Votes	%
Republican	Henry McMaster (incumbent)	155,723	42.32
Republican	John Warren	102,390	27.82
Republican	Catherine Templeton	78,705	21.39
Republican	Kevin Bryant	24,790	6.74
Republican	Yancey McGill	6,375	1.73
Total votes		367,983	100.00

South Carolina Republican primary runoff
Party	Candidate	Votes	%
Republican	Henry McMaster (incumbent)	184,286	53.63
Republican	John Warren	159,349	46.37
Total votes		343,635	100.00

South Carolina Democratic primary
Party	Candidate	Votes	%
Democratic	James Smith	148,633	61.81
Democratic	Marguerite Willis	66,248	27.55
Democratic	Phil Noble	25,587	10.64
Total votes		240,468	100.00

South Carolina general election
Party	Candidate	Votes	%	±%
Republican	Henry McMaster (incumbent)	921,342	53.96%	–1.94
Democratic	James Smith	784,182	45.92%	+4.50
Write-in		2,045	0.12%	+0.05
Total votes		1,707,569	100.00%	
Republican hold				

== South Dakota ==
2018 South Dakota gubernatorial election
- November 6, 2018
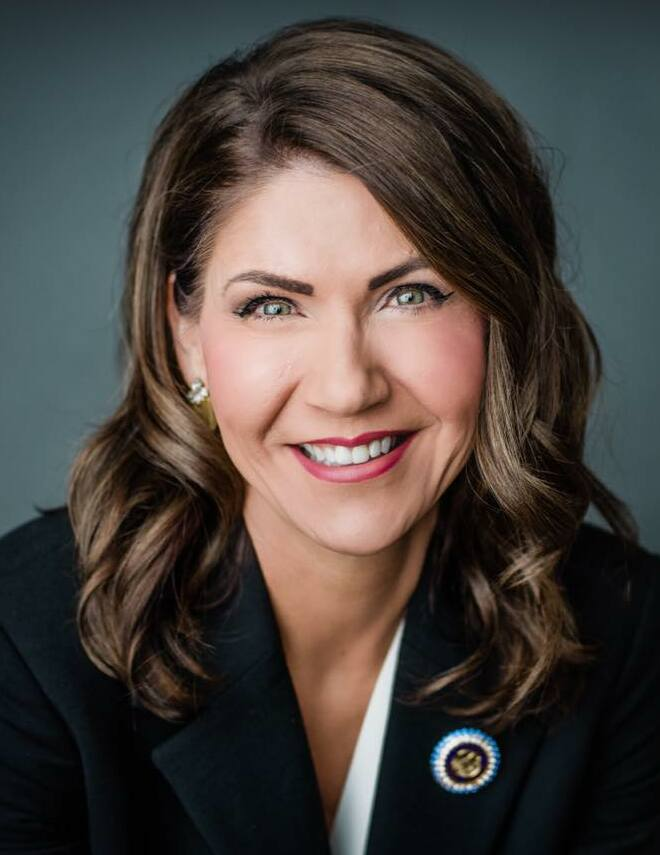

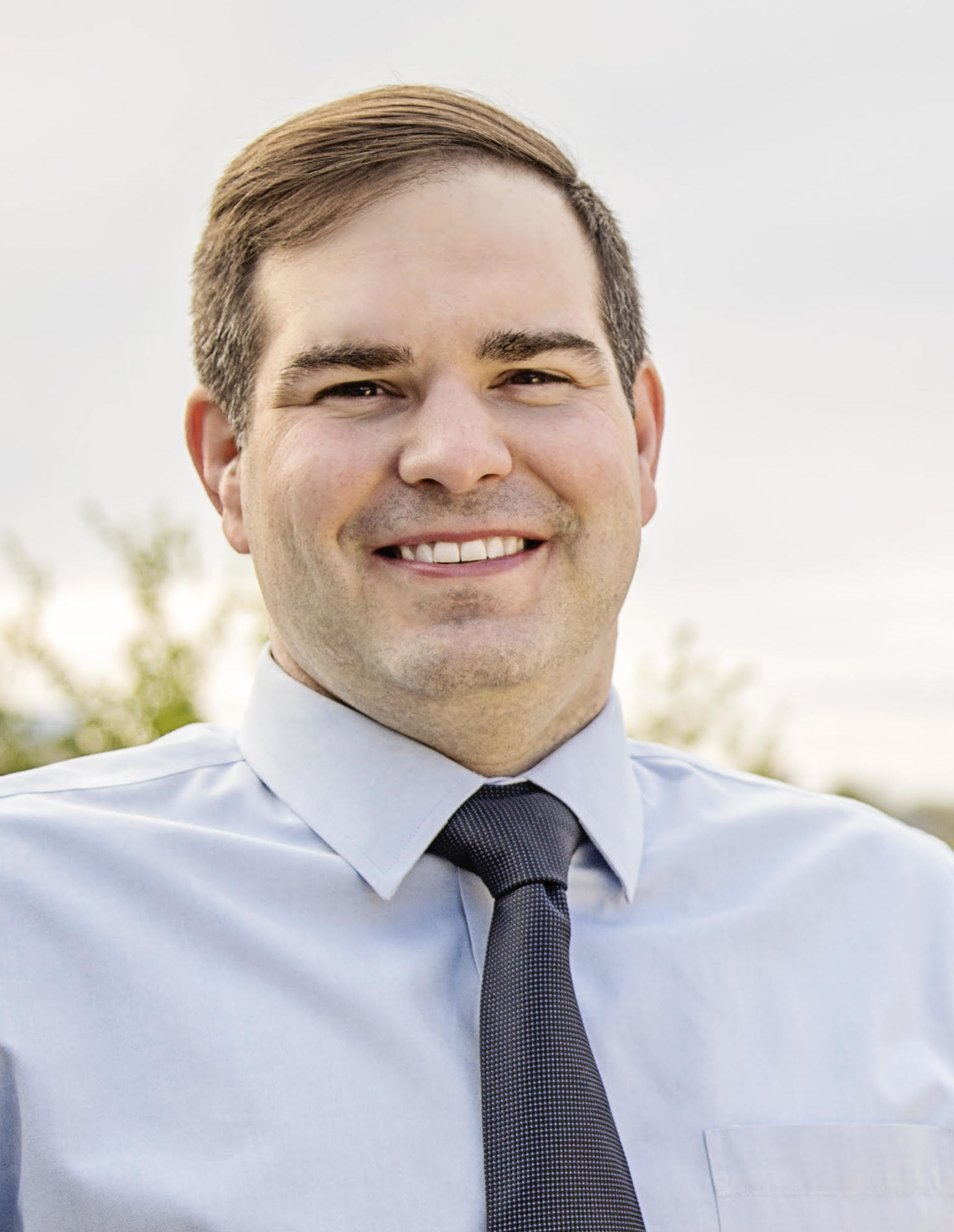
Nominee	Kristi Noem	Billie Sutton
Party	Republican	Democratic
Running mate	Larry Rhoden	Michelle Lavallee
Popular vote	172,912	161,454
Percentage	51.0%	47.6%
- County Results; Noem: 40–50% 50–60% 60–70% 70–80% Sutton: 40-50% 50–60% 60–70% 70–80% 80–90% >90%
Governor before election
Dennis Daugaard
Republican
Elected Governor
Kristi Noem
Republican

Two-term Governor Dennis Daugaard was term-limited, as South Dakota does not allow governors to serve three consecutive terms.

U.S. Representative Kristi Noem and Billie Sutton, the minority leader of the South Dakota Senate, won the Republican and Democratic nominations, respectively.

Noem won the election.

South Dakota Republican primary
Party	Candidate	Votes	%
Republican	Kristi Noem	57,437	56.03
Republican	Marty Jackley	45,069	43.97
Total votes		102,506	100.00

South Dakota general election
Party	Candidate	Votes	%	±%
Republican	Kristi Noem	172,912	50.97%	–19.50
Democratic	Billie Sutton	161,454	47.60%	+22.17
Libertarian	Kurt Evans	4,848	1.43%	N/A
Total votes		339,214	100.00%	
Republican hold				

== Tennessee ==
2018 Tennessee gubernatorial election
- November 6, 2018
- Turnout: 54.46% ▲20.49 pp
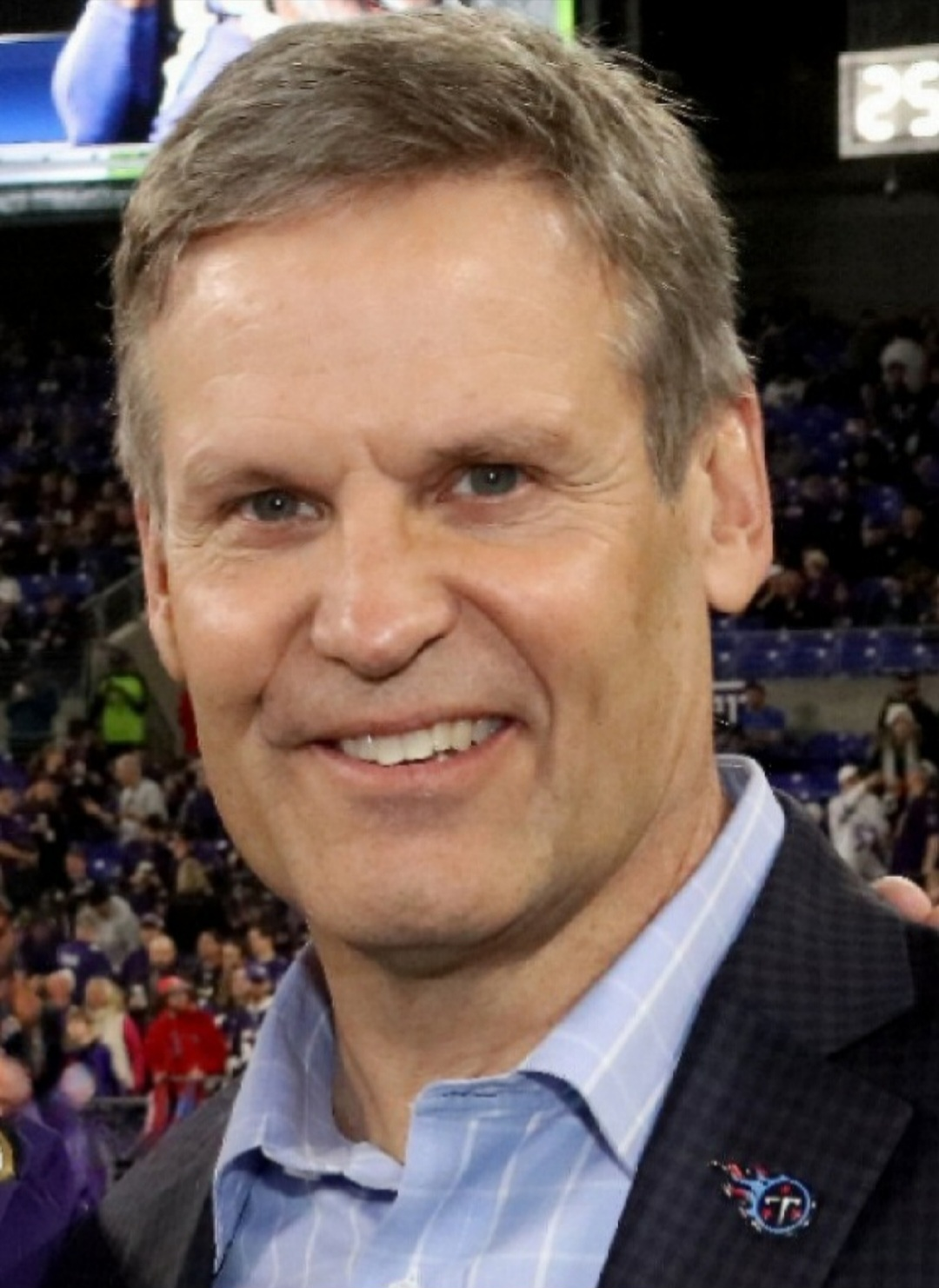

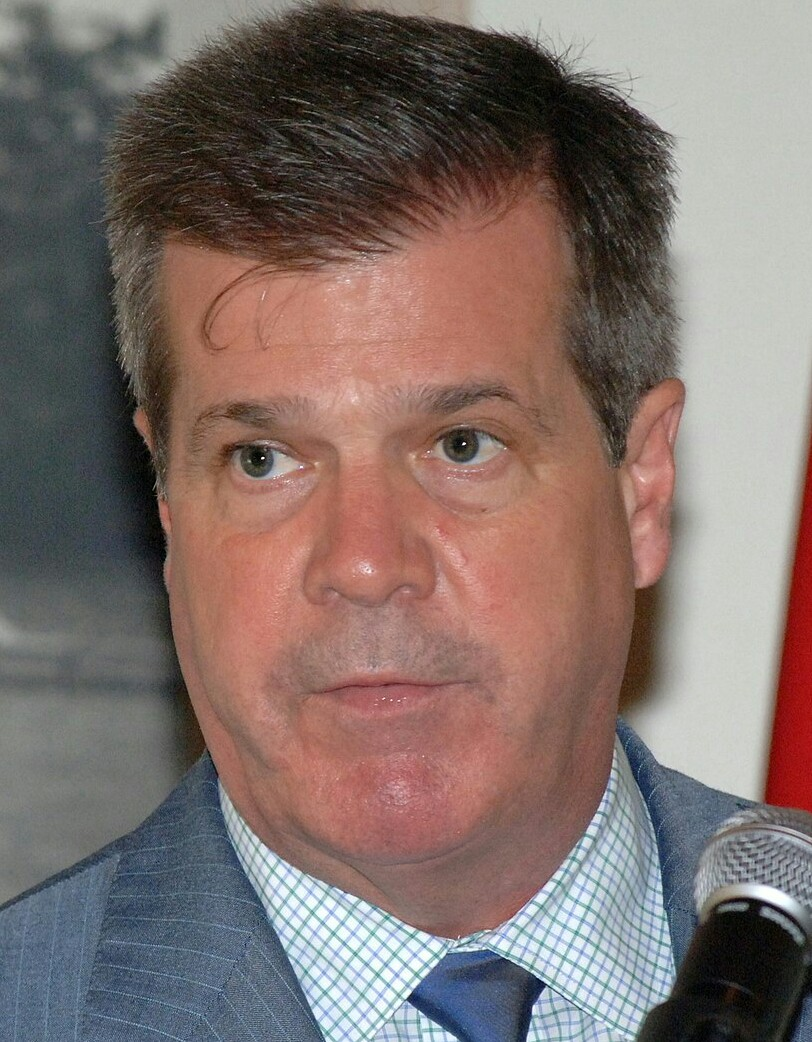
Nominee	Bill Lee	Karl Dean
Party	Republican	Democratic
Popular vote	1,336,106	864,863
Percentage	59.6%	38.6%
- Lee: 40–50% 50–60% 60–70% 70–80% 80–90% >90% Dean: 40–50% 50–60% 60–70% 70–80% 80–90% >90% Tie: 40–50% No data
Governor before election
Bill Haslam
Republican
Elected Governor
Bill Lee
Republican

Two-term Governor Bill Haslam was term-limited, as Tennessee does not allow governors to serve three consecutive terms.

Businessman Bill Lee defeated former Haslam administration official Randy Boyd, U.S. Representative Diane Black, and speaker of the Tennessee House of Representatives Beth Harwell for the Republican nomination.

Former Nashville Mayor Karl Dean defeated House Minority Leader Craig Fitzhugh for the Democratic nomination.

Bill Lee won the election in a landslide.

Tennessee Republican primary
Party	Candidate	Votes	%
Republican	Bill Lee	291,414	36.75
Republican	Randy Boyd	193,054	24.35
Republican	Diane Black	182,457	23.01
Republican	Beth Harwell	121,484	15.32
Republican	Kay White	3,215	0.41
Republican	Basil Marceaux	1,264	0.16
Total votes		792,888	100.00

Tennessee Democratic primary
Party	Candidate	Votes	%
Democratic	Karl Dean	280,553	75.14
Democratic	Craig Fitzhugh	72,553	23.42
Democratic	Mezianne Vale Payne	20,284	5.44
Total votes		373,390	100.00

Tennessee general election
Party	Candidate	Votes	%	±%
Republican	Bill Lee	1,336,106	59.56%	–10.75
Democratic	Karl Dean	864,863	38.55%	+15.71
Independent	Other candidates	42,314	1.89%	–4.96
Write-in		11	0.00%	±0.00
Total votes		2,243,294	100.00%	
Republican hold				

== Texas ==
2018 Texas gubernatorial election
- November 6, 2018
- Turnout: 53.01% (of registered voters) ▲19.31pp 42.07% (of voting age population)
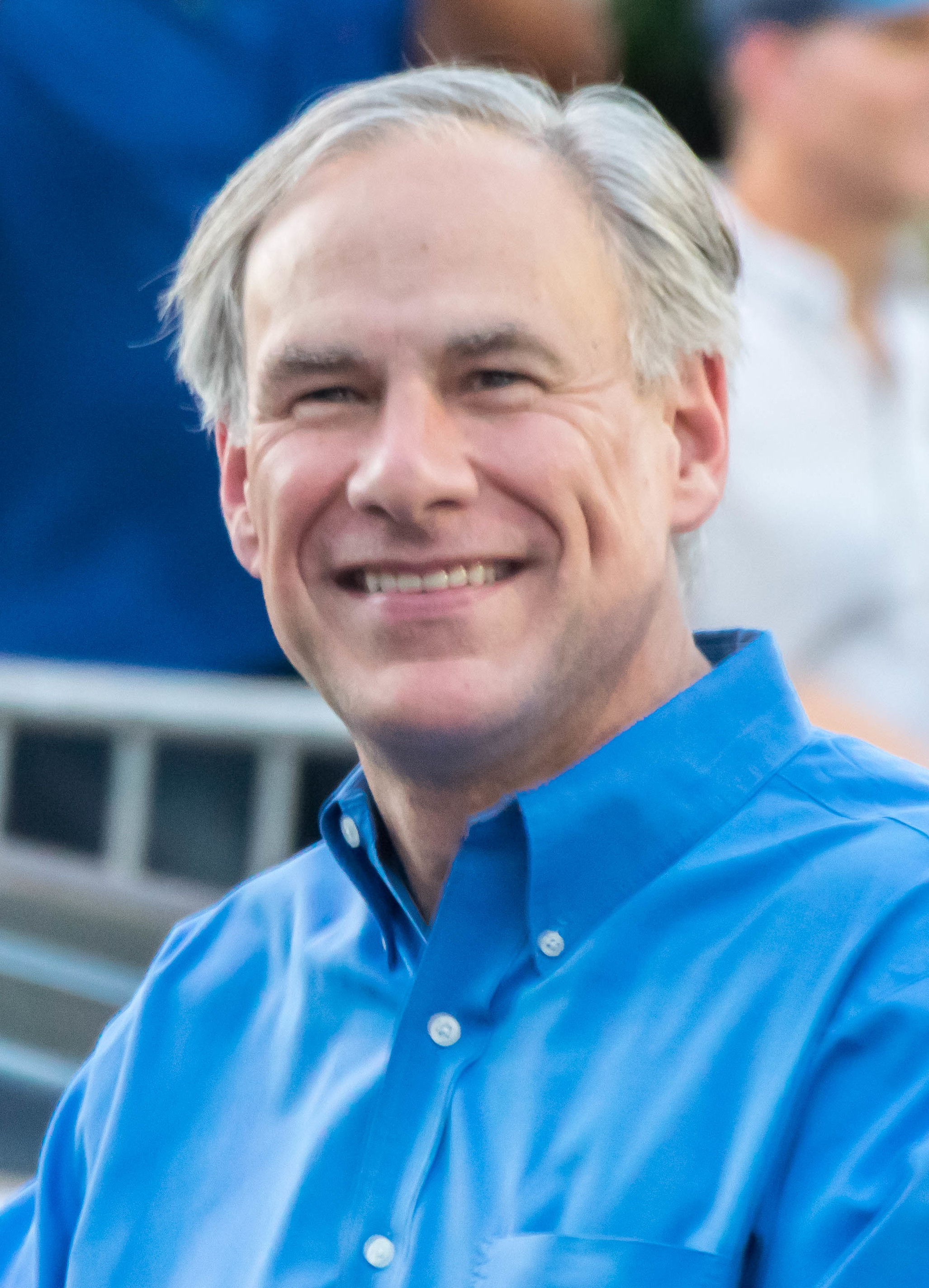

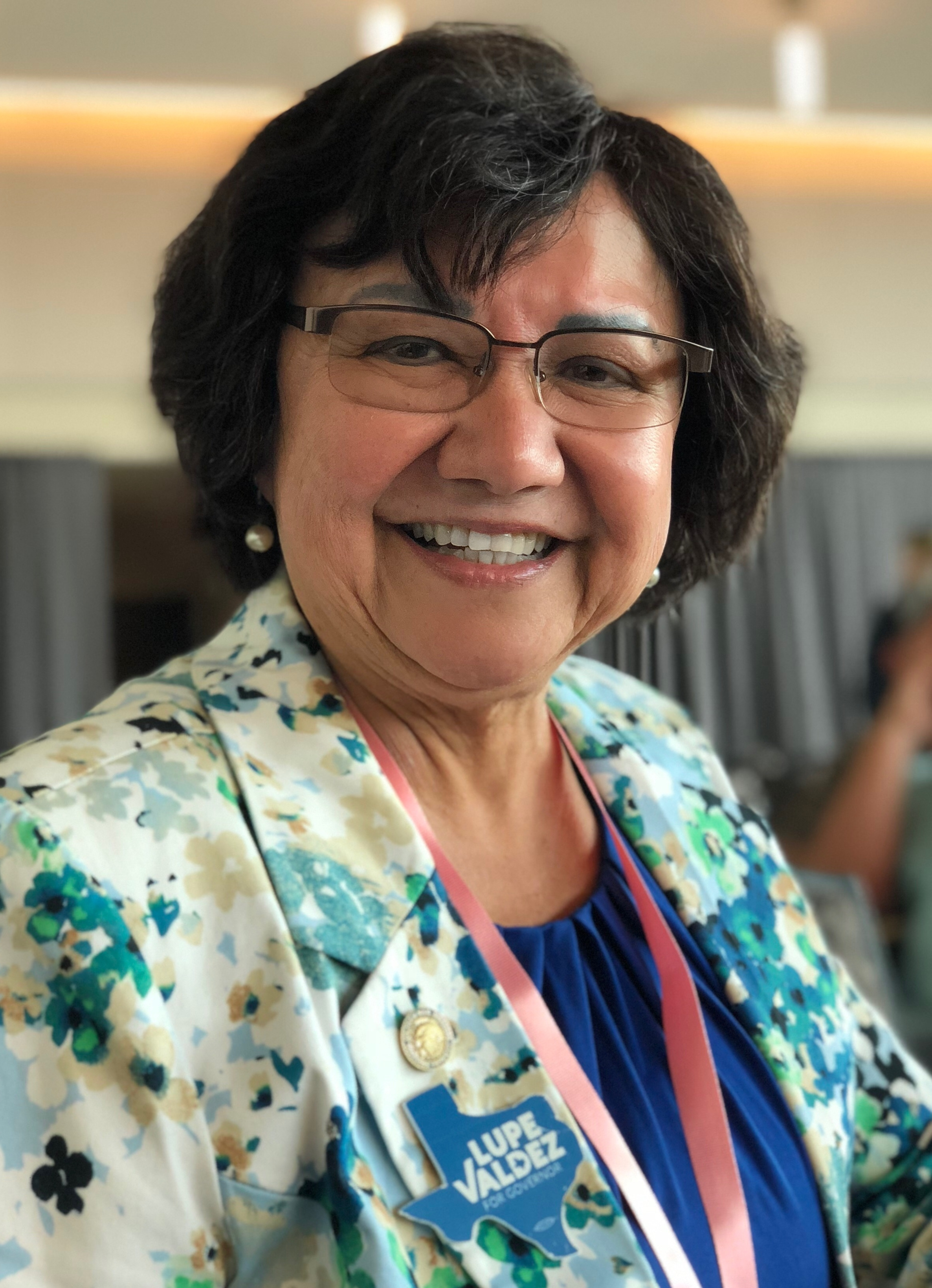
Nominee	Greg Abbott	Lupe Valdez
Party	Republican	Democratic
Popular vote	4,656,196	3,546,615
Percentage	55.8%	42.5%
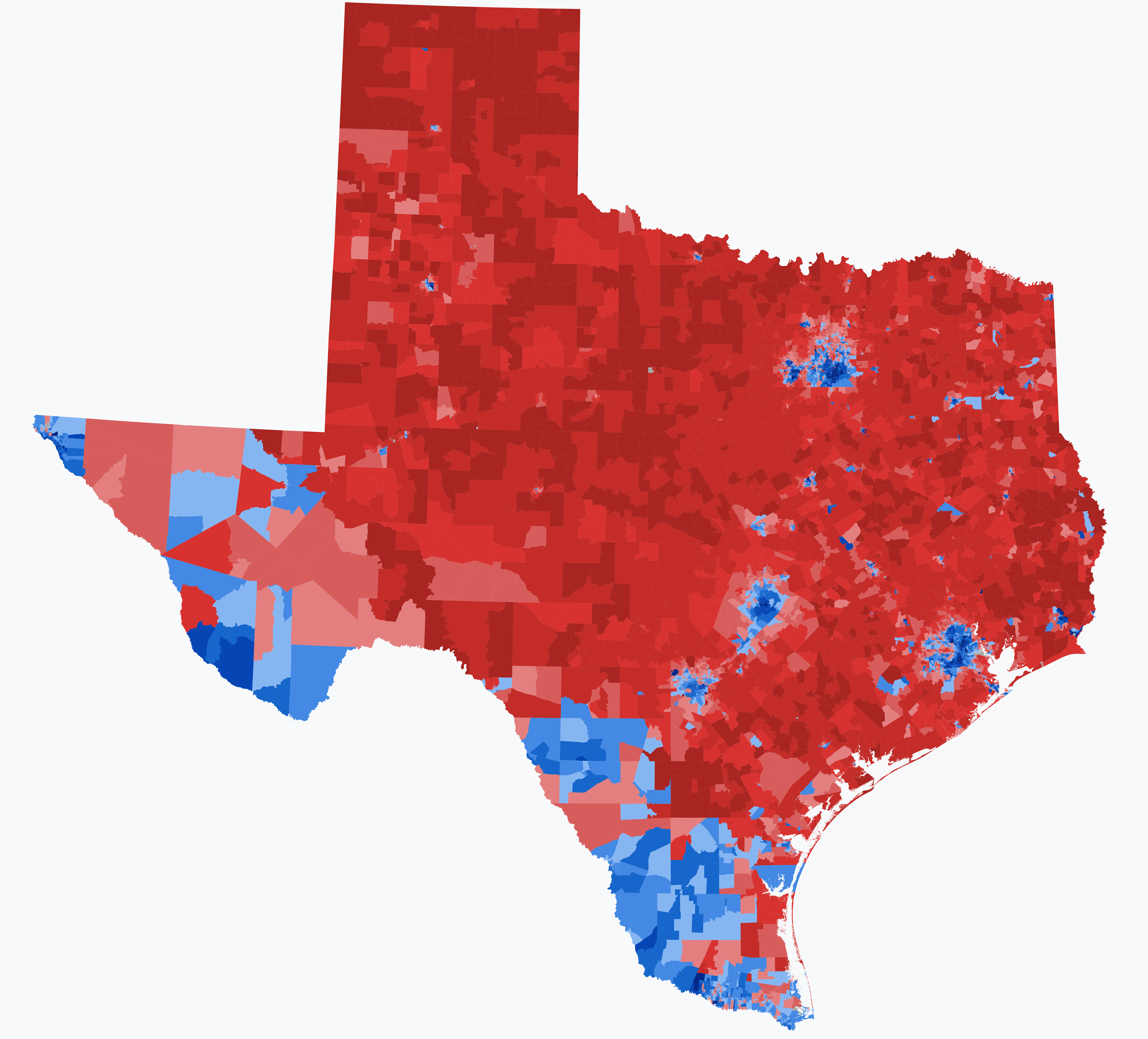
- Abbott: 40–50% 50–60% 60–70% 70–80% 80–90% >90% Valdez: 40–50% 50–60% 60–70% 70–80% 80–90% >90% No data
Governor before election
Greg Abbott
Republican
Elected Governor
Greg Abbott
Republican

One-term incumbent Greg Abbott ran for re-election.

Lupe Valdez, Dallas County sheriff, announced her bid on December 6, 2017, and, after a runoff primary with Andrew White, entrepreneur and son of Governor Mark White, won the Democratic nomination.

Both Kathie Glass and Kory Watkins sought the Libertarian nomination.

Abbott won re-election.

Texas Republican primary
Party	Candidate	Votes	%
Republican	Greg Abbott (incumbent)	1,392,310	90.38
Republican	Barbara Krueger	127,549	8.28
Republican	Larry Kilgore	20,504	1.33
Total votes		1,540,363	100.00

Texas Democratic primary
Party	Candidate	Votes	%
Democratic	Lupe Valdez	436,666	42.89
Democratic	Andrew White	278,708	27.37
Democratic	Cedric Davis Sr.	83,938	8.24
Democratic	Grady Yarbrough	54,660	5.36
Democratic	Jeffrey Payne	48,407	4.75
Democratic	Adrian Ocegueda	44,825	4.40
Democratic	Tom Wakely	34,889	3.42
Democratic	James Clark	21,945	2.15
Democratic	Joe Mumbach	13,921	1.36
Total votes		1,017,959	100.00

Texas Democratic primary runoff
Party	Candidate	Votes	%
Democratic	Lupe Valdez	227,577	52.66
Democratic	Andrew White	201,356	46.59
Total votes		432,180	100.00

Texas general election
Party	Candidate	Votes	%	±%
Republican	Greg Abbott (incumbent)	4,656,196	55.81%	–3.46
Democratic	Lupe Valdez	3,546,615	42.51%	+3.61
Libertarian	Mark Tippetts	140,632	1.69%	+0.28
Total votes		8,343,443	100.00%	
Republican hold				

== Vermont ==
2018 Vermont gubernatorial election
- November 6, 2018
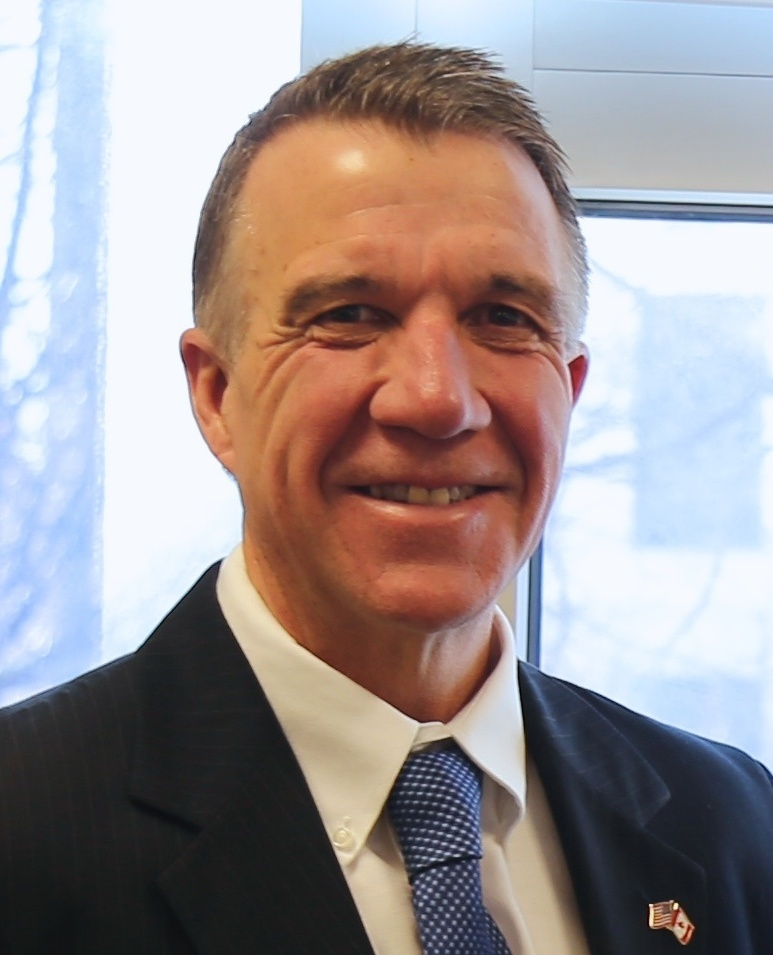

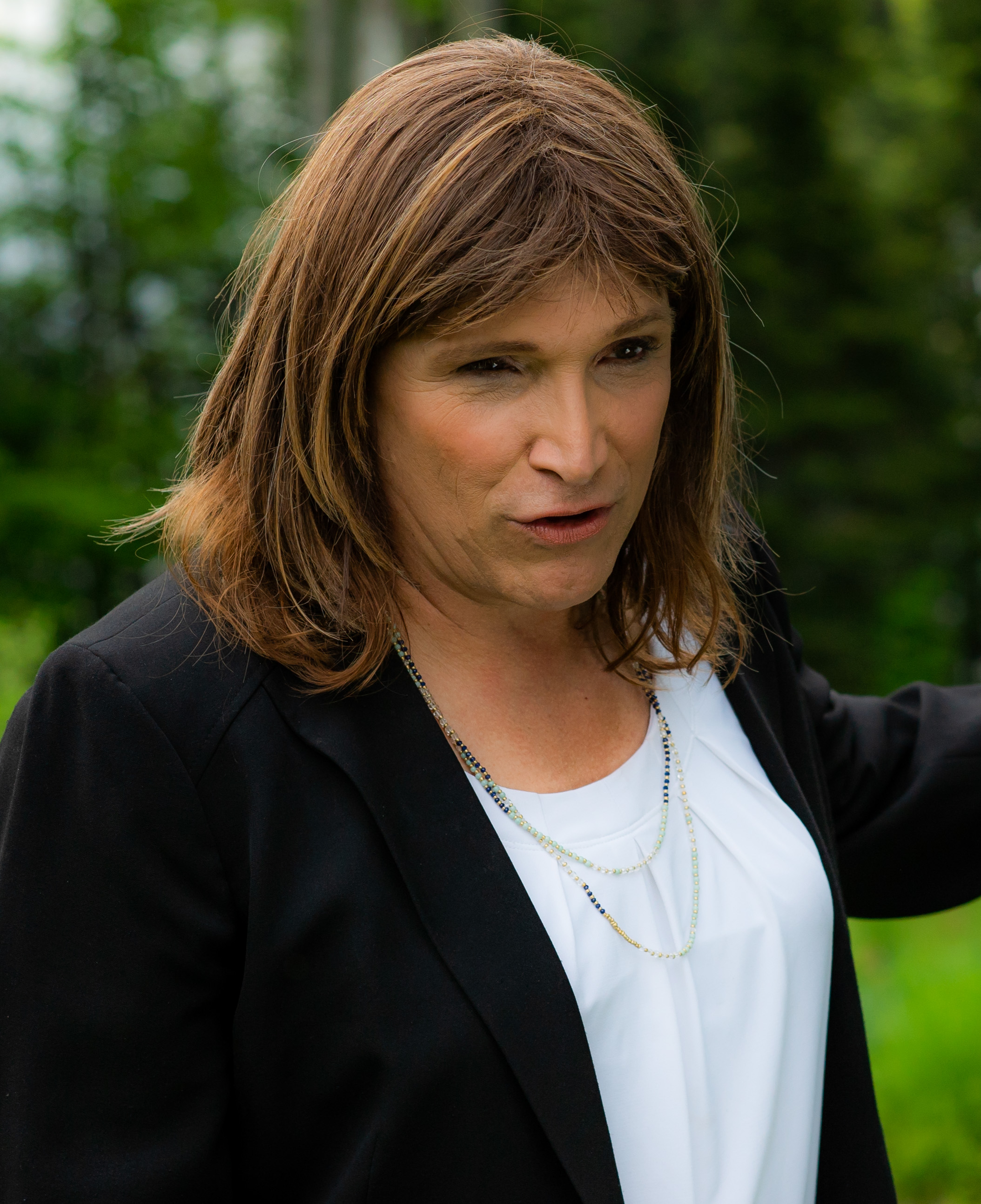
Nominee	Phil Scott	Christine Hallquist
Party	Republican	Democratic
Popular vote	151,261	110,335
Percentage	54.4%	39.7%
- County results Scott: 50–60% 60–70% 70–80% Hallquist: 50–60%
Governor before election
Phil Scott
Republican
Elected Governor
Phil Scott
Republican

As the governor of Vermont can serve a two-year term, Phil Scott, who was elected in 2016, ran for re-election. He was nominated in the primary.

Former Vermont Electric Cooperative CEO Christine Hallquist was the Democratic nominee. She was the first transgender woman to be nominated for governor by a major party.

Incumbent lieutenant governor David Zuckerman declined to run as a Progressive in the election and instead ran for re-election to that position.

Scott won re-election.

Vermont Republican primary
Party	Candidate	Votes	%
Republican	Phil Scott (incumbent)	24,042	66.67
Republican	Keith Stern	11,617	32.22
Write-in		401	1.11
Total votes		36,060	100.00

Vermont Democratic primary
Party	Candidate	Votes	%
Democratic	Christine Hallquist	27,622	45.07
Democratic	James Ehlers	12,668	20.67
Democratic	Brenda Siegel	12,260	20.01
Democratic	Ethan Sonneborn	4,696	7.66
Write-in		4,024	6.57
Total votes		61,279	100.00

Vermont general election
Party	Candidate	Votes	%	±%
Republican	Phil Scott (incumbent)	151,261	55.19%	+2.29
Democratic	Christine Hallquist	110,335	40.25%	–3.92
Independent	Trevor Barlow	3,266	1.19%	N/A
Independent	Charles Laramie	2,287	0.83%	N/A
Marijuana	Cris Ericson	2,129	0.78%	N/A
Earth Rights	Stephen Marx	1,855	0.68%	N/A
Liberty Union	Emily Peyton	1,839	0.66%	–2.17
Write-in		1,115	0.41%	+0.31
Total votes		274,087	100.00%	
Republican hold				

== Wisconsin ==
2018 Wisconsin gubernatorial election
- November 6, 2018
- Turnout: 61.2%
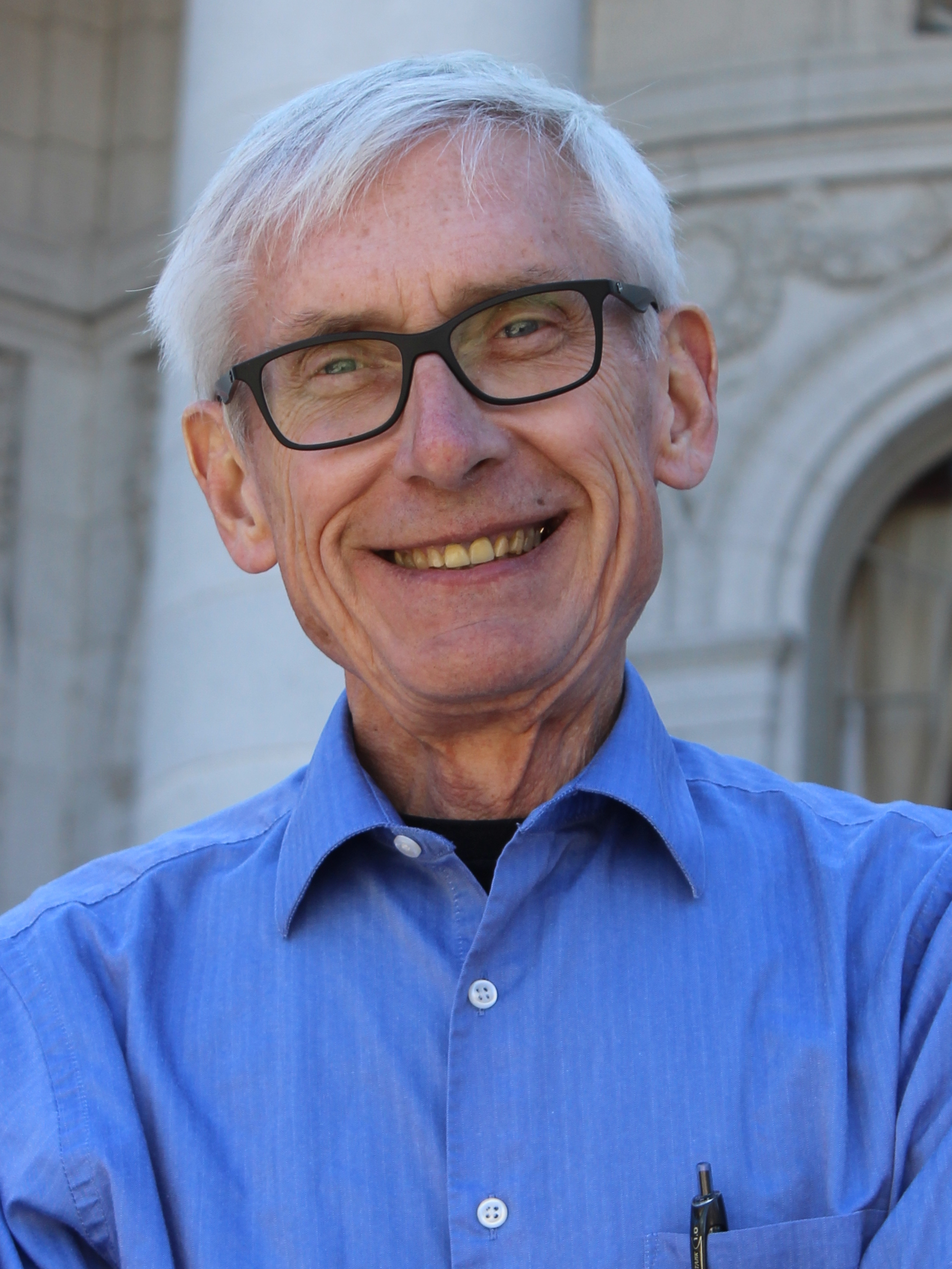

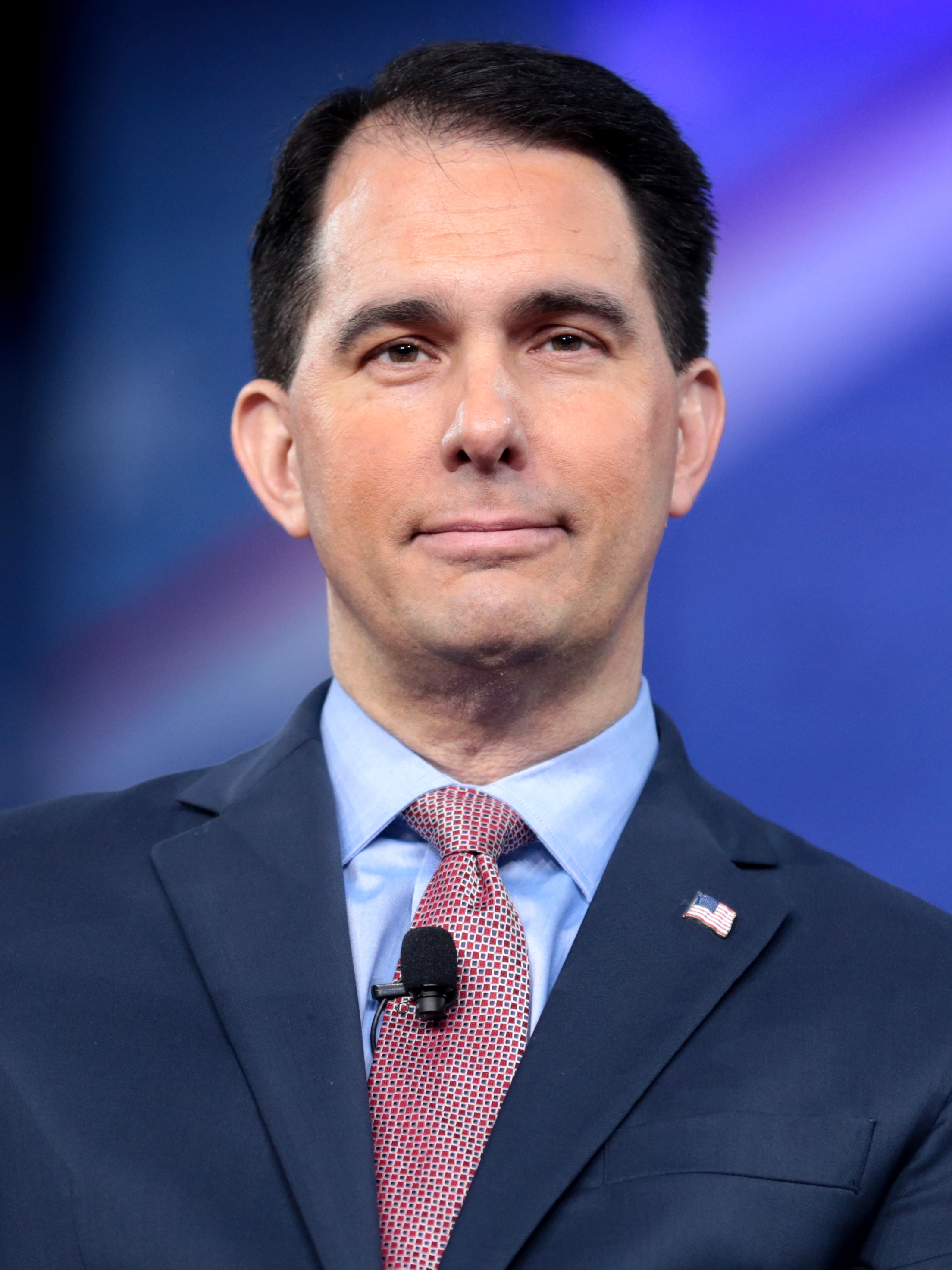
Nominee	Tony Evers	Scott Walker
Party	Democratic	Republican
Running mate	Mandela Barnes	Rebecca Kleefisch
Popular vote	1,324,307	1,295,080
Percentage	49.5%	48.4%
- County results Evers: 40–50% 50–60% 60–70% 70–80% Walker: 40–50% 50–60% 60–70% 70–80%
Governor before election
Scott Walker
Republican
Elected Governor
Tony Evers
Democratic

Two-term incumbent Scott Walker was eligible for re-election, as Wisconsin does not have gubernatorial term limits.

State schools superintendent Tony Evers won the Democratic nomination.

2016 Libertarian candidate for U.S. Senate Phil Anderson ran as a Libertarian.

Michael White was the candidate for the Green Party.

Evers won the election.

Wisconsin Republican primary
Party	Candidate	Votes	%
Republican	Scott Walker (incumbent)	417,619	91.59
Republican	Robert Meyer	38,347	8.41
Total votes		455,966	100.00

Wisconsin Democratic primary
Party	Candidate	Votes	%
Democratic	Tony Evers	224,502	41.75
Democratic	Mahlon Mitchell	88,077	16.38
Democratic	Kelda Roys	68,952	12.82
Democratic	Kathleen Vinehout	43,975	8.18
Democratic	Mike McCabe	39,745	7.39
Democratic	Matt Flynn	31,539	5.87
Democratic	Paul Soglin	28,128	5.23
Democratic	Josh Pade	1,929	0.36
Write-in		10,872	2.02
Total votes		537,719	100.00

Wisconsin general election
Party	Candidate	Votes	%	±%
Democratic	Tony Evers	1,324,307	49.54%	+2.95
Republican	Scott Walker (incumbent)	1,295,080	48.44%	–3.82
Libertarian	Phil Anderson	20,225	0.76%	N/A
Independent	Maggie Turnbull	18,884	0.71%	N/A
Green	Michael White	11,087	0.41%	N/A
Independent	Arnie Enz	2,745	0.10%	N/A
Write-in		980	0.04%	–0.02
Total votes		2,673,308	100.00%	
Democratic gain from Republican				

== Wyoming ==
2018 Wyoming gubernatorial election
- November 6, 2018
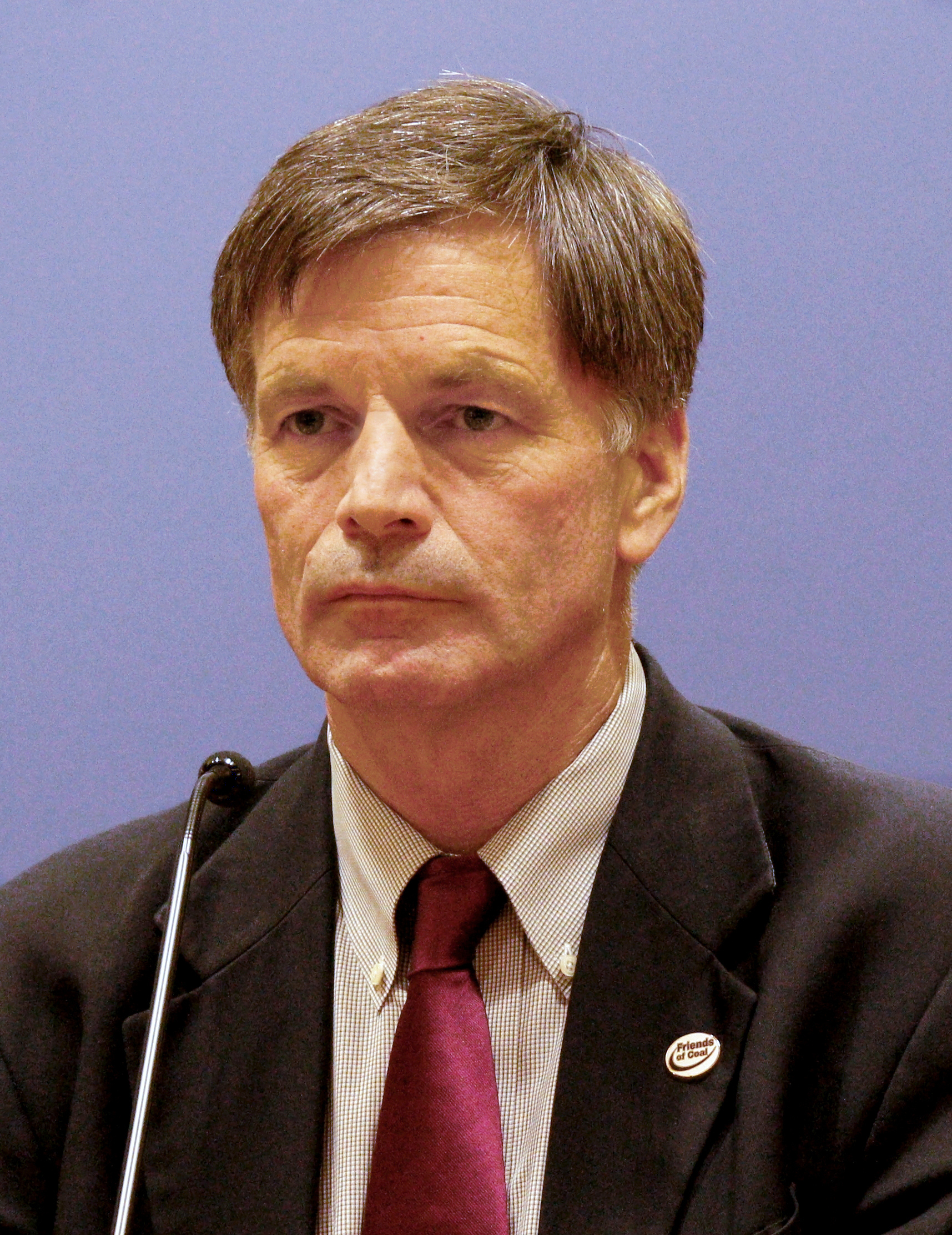

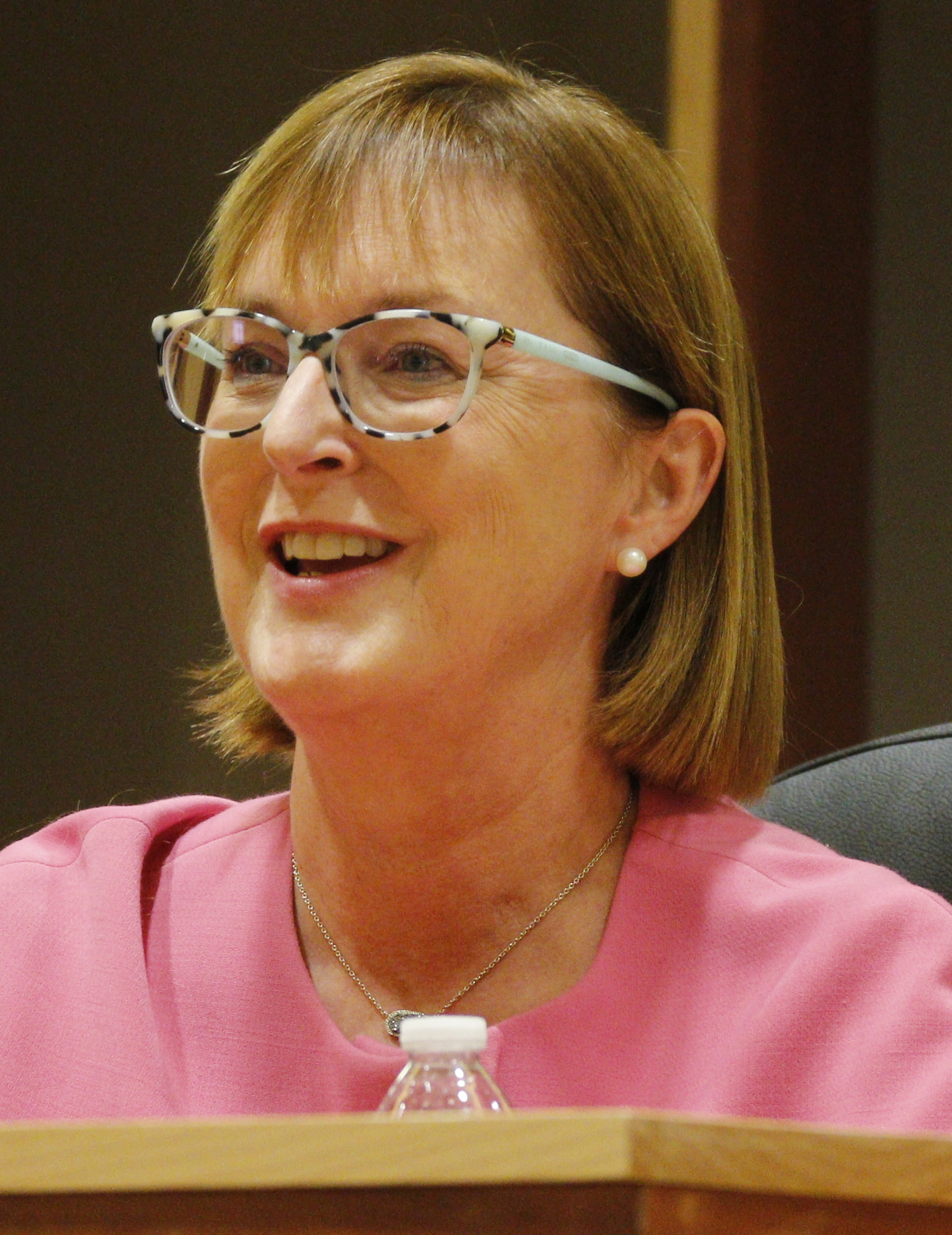
Nominee	Mark Gordon	Mary Throne
Party	Republican	Democratic
Popular vote	136,412	55,965
Percentage	67.1%	27.3%
- County results Gordon: 60–70% 70–80% 80–90% Throne: 40–50% 50–60%
Governor before election
Matt Mead
Republican
Elected Governor
Mark Gordon
Republican

Two-term Governor Matt Mead was term-limited as Wyoming limits governors to serving for eight years in a sixteen-year period.

The Republican nominee was State Treasurer Mark Gordon.

Former state House Minority leader Mary Throne won the Democratic nomination.

Mark Gordon won the election in a landslide.

Wyoming Republican primary
Party	Candidate	Votes	%
Republican	Mark Gordon	38,951	32.98
Republican	Foster Friess	29,842	25.27
Republican	Harriet Hageman	25,052	21.21
Republican	Sam Galeotos	14,554	12.32
Republican	Taylor Haynes	6,511	5.51
Republican	Bill Dahlin	1,763	1.49
Write-in		1,428	1.21
Total votes		118,101	100.00

Wyoming Democratic primary
Party	Candidate	Votes	%
Democratic	Mary Throne	12,948	66.49
Democratic	Michael Green	2,391	12.28
Democratic	Kenneth Casner	1,213	6.23
Democratic	Rex Wilde	1,201	6.17
Write-in		1,721	8.83
Total votes		19,474	100.00

Wyoming general election
Party	Candidate	Votes	%	±%
Republican	Mark Gordon	136,412	67.12%	+7.73
Democratic	Mary Throne	55,965	27.54%	+0.29
Constitution	Rex Rammell	6,751	3.32%	N/A
Libertarian	Lawrence Struempf	3,010	1.48%	–0.93
Write-in		1,100	0.54%	–4.52
Total votes		203,238	100.00%	
Republican hold				

== Territories and federal district ==
=== District of Columbia ===
2018 Washington, D.C., mayoral election
- November 6, 2018
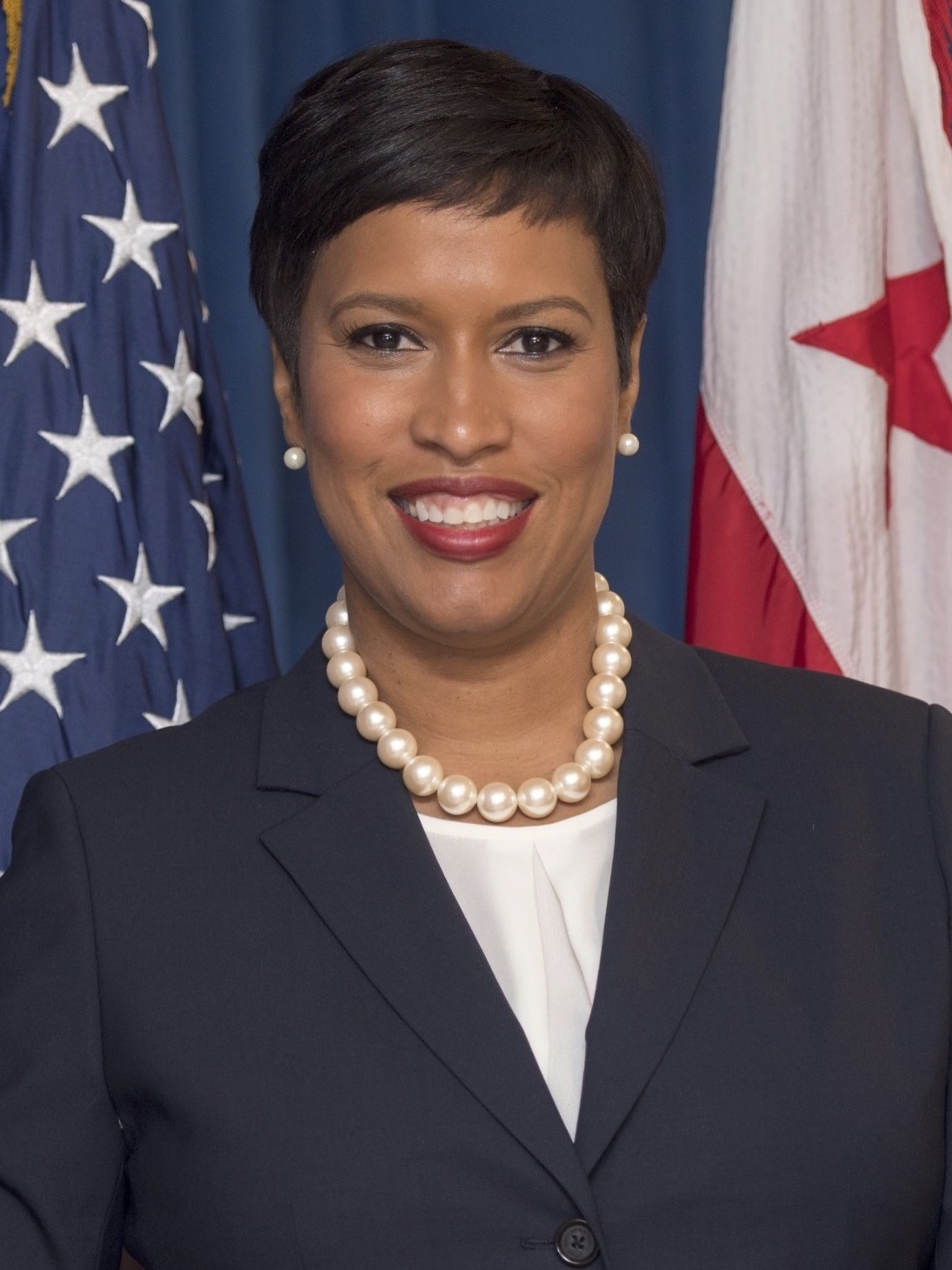

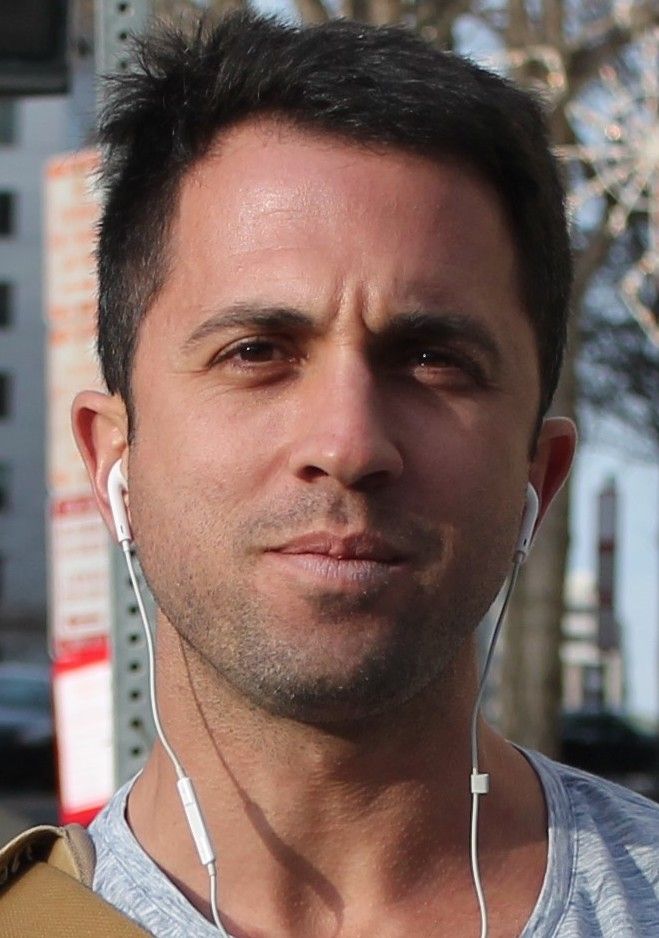
Nominee	Muriel Bowser	Ann Wilcox	Dustin Canter
Party	Democratic	DC Statehood Green	Independent
Popular vote	171,608	20,950	15,478
Percentage	76.4%	9.3%	6.9%
- Ward results Bowser: 70-80%
Mayor before election
Muriel Bowser
Democratic
Elected Mayor
Muriel Bowser
Democratic

One term incumbent Muriel Bowser ran for re-election with little competition in the primary. She was the Democratic nominee.

Ann Wilcox, a former Board of Education member, won the nomination of the D.C. Statehood Green Party. Dustin Canter, an entrepreneur and fitness businessman, ran as an independent.

Bowser won re-election.

District of Columbia Democratic primary
Party	Candidate	Votes	%
Democratic	Muriel Bowser (incumbent)	61,855	79.99
Democratic	James Butler	7,915	10.24
Democratic	Ernest E. Johnson	4,674	6.04
Write-in		2,887	3.73
Total votes		77,331	100.00

District of Columbia Green primary
Party	Candidate	Votes	%
DC Statehood Green	Ann C. Wilcox	379	82.21
Write-in		82	17.79
Total votes		461	100.00

District of Columbia general election
Party	Candidate	Votes	%	±%
Democratic	Muriel Bowser (incumbent)	171,608	76.39%	+21.89
DC Statehood Green	Ann C. Wilcox	20,950	9.33%	+8.47
Independent	Dustin Canter	15,478	6.89%	N/A
Libertarian	Martin Moulton	7,569	3.37%	+2.64
Write-in		9,053	4.03%	+3.12
Total votes		224,658	100.00%	
Democratic hold				

=== Guam ===
2018 Guamanian gubernatorial election
- Tuesday, November 6, 2018
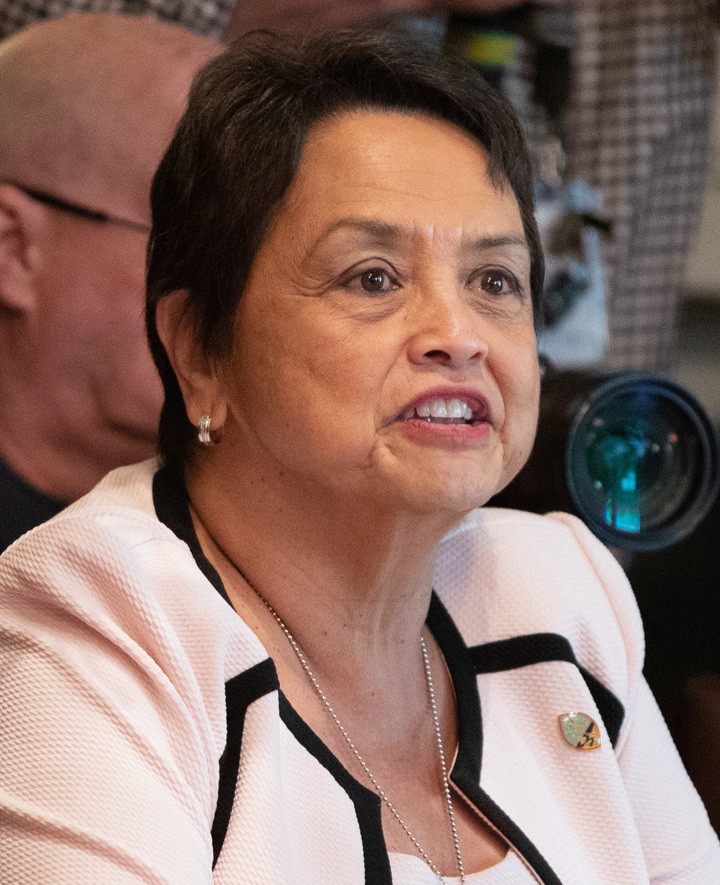

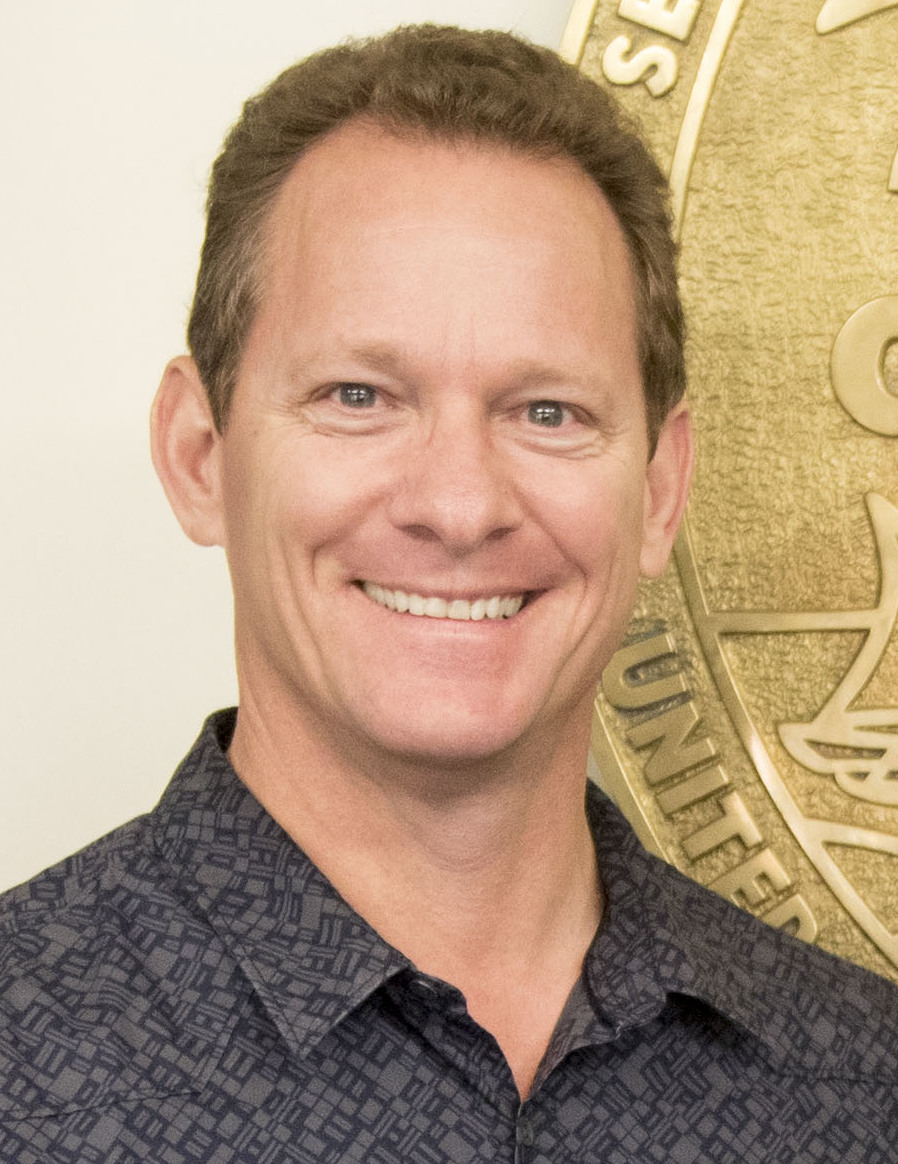

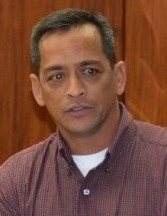
Nominee	Lourdes Guerrero	Ray Tenorio	Frank Aguon Jr.
Party	Democratic	Republican	Write-in
Running mate	Josh Tenorio	Tony Ada	Alicia Limtiaco
Popular vote	18,081	9,419	8,161
Percentage	50.7%	26.4%	22.9%
- Village results Guerrero: 40–50% 50–60% 60–70%
Governor before election
Eddie Baza Calvo
Republican
Elected Governor
Lou Leon Guerrero
Democratic

The incumbent two-term governor Eddie Baza Calvo was term-limited, after his recent re-election win in 2014, as Guam does not allow governors to serve more than two consecutive terms.

Republican Lt. Governor Ray Tenorio officially declared his bid to succeed Eddie Calvo as the next governor of Guam. Tenorio won the Republican nomination without opposition.

The Democratic nominee was former Territorial Senator Lou Leon Guerrero, who defeated three other politicians in the August 24 primary.

Guerrero won the election.

Guam Republican primary
Party	Candidate	Votes	%
Republican	Ray Tenorio	3,148	97.98
Write-in		65	2.02
Total votes		3,213	100.00

Guam Democratic primary
Party	Candidate	Votes	%
Democratic	Lou Leon Guerrero	8,218	32.14
Democratic	Frank B. Aguon Jr.	7,958	31.12
Democratic	Carl T.C. Gutierrez	5,609	21.94
Democratic	Dennis Rodriguez Jr.	3,761	14.71
Write-in		22	0.09
Total votes		25,568	100.00

Guam general election
Party	Candidate	Votes	%	±%
Democratic	Lou Leon Guerrero	18,258	50.79%	+14.82
Republican	Ray Tenorio	9,487	26.39%	–37.31
Write-in	Frank B. Aguon Jr.	8,205	22.82%	N/A
Total votes		35,950	100.00%	
Democratic gain from Republican				

=== Northern Mariana Islands ===
2018 Northern Mariana Islands gubernatorial election
- November 13, 2018
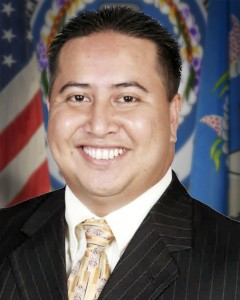

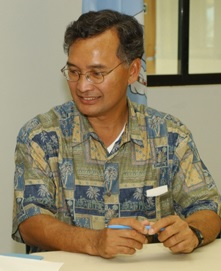
Nominee	Ralph Torres	Juan Babauta
Party	Republican	Independent
Running mate	Arnold Palacios	Rita Sablan
Popular vote	7,053	4,293
Percentage	62.16%	37.84%
- Results by voting district: Ralph Torres: 55–60% 60–65% 65–70% 70–75%
Governor before election
Ralph Torres
Republican
Elected Governor
Ralph Torres
Republican

Incumbent governor Ralph Torres, who took office upon Eloy Inos's death in December 2015, sought election to a full term. Former governor Juan Babauta also sought the governorship, running as an independent.

Torres won election to a full term.

Northern Mariana Islands general election
Party	Candidate	Votes	%	±%
Republican	Ralph Torres (incumbent)	8,922	62.21%	+5.25
Independent	Juan Babauta	5,420	37.79%	N/A
Total votes		14,342	100.00%	
Republican hold				

=== U.S. Virgin Islands ===
2018 Virgin Islands gubernatorial election
- November 6, 2018 (general); November 20, 2018 (runoff)
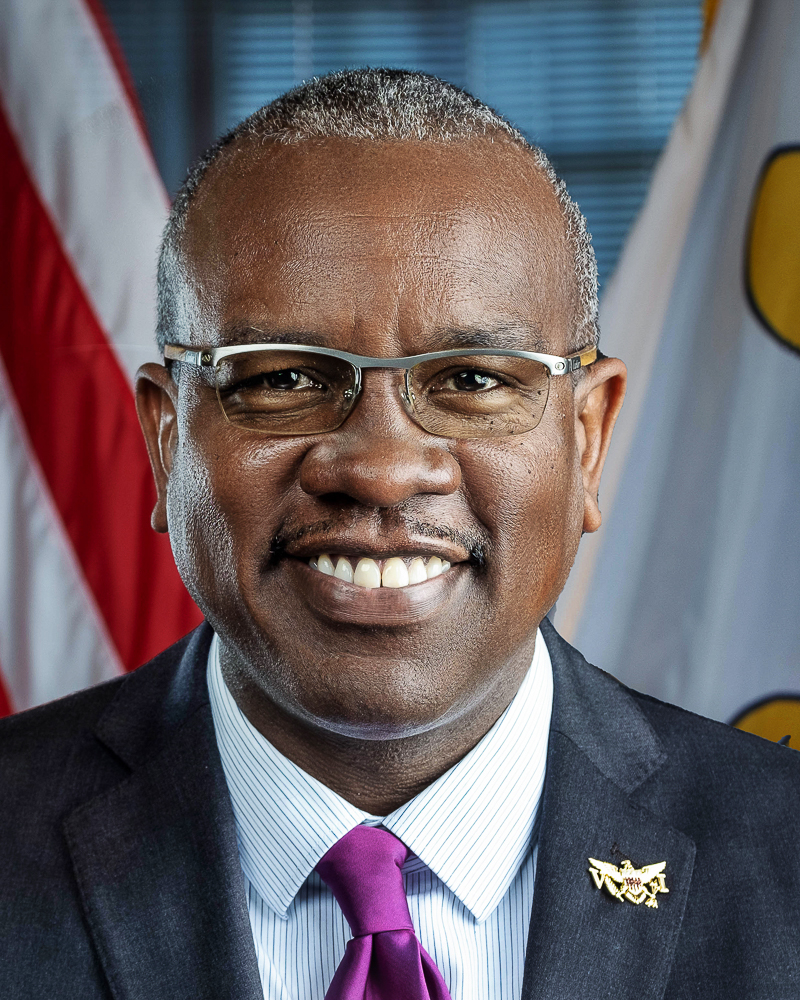

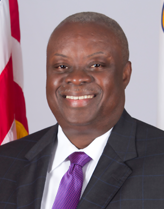
Candidate	Albert Bryan	Kenneth Mapp
Party	Democratic	Independent
Running mate	Tregenza Roach	Osbert Potter
First round	9,711; 38.1%	8,529; 33.4%
Runoff	11,796; 54.5%	9,766; 45.1%
- District results
Governor before election
Kenneth Mapp
Independent
Elected Governor
Albert Bryan
Democratic

Albert Bryan (the Democratic nominee) won the runoff election on November 20, 2018, defeating Independent incumbent Kenneth Mapp.

U.S. Virgin Islands general election
Party	Candidate	Votes	%
Democratic	Albert Bryan Jr.	9,711	38.08
Independent	Kenneth Mapp (incumbent)	8,529	33.45
Independent	Adlah "Foncie" Donastorg	4,201	16.47
Independent	Warren Mosler	1,199	4.70
Independent	Soraya Diase Coffelt	1,195	4.69
Independent	Moleto A. Smith	400	1.57
Independent	Janette Millin Young	237	0.93
Write-in		20	0.11
Total votes		25,501	100.00

U.S. Virgin Islands general runoff election
Party	Candidate	Votes	%	±%
Democratic	Albert Bryan Jr.	11,796	54.54%	+18.67
Independent	Kenneth Mapp (incumbent)	9,766	45.15%	–18.74
Write-in		66	0.31%	+0.07
Total votes		21,635	100.00%	
Democratic gain from Independent				
