= Gina Raimondo =

American politician and businesswoman (born 1971)

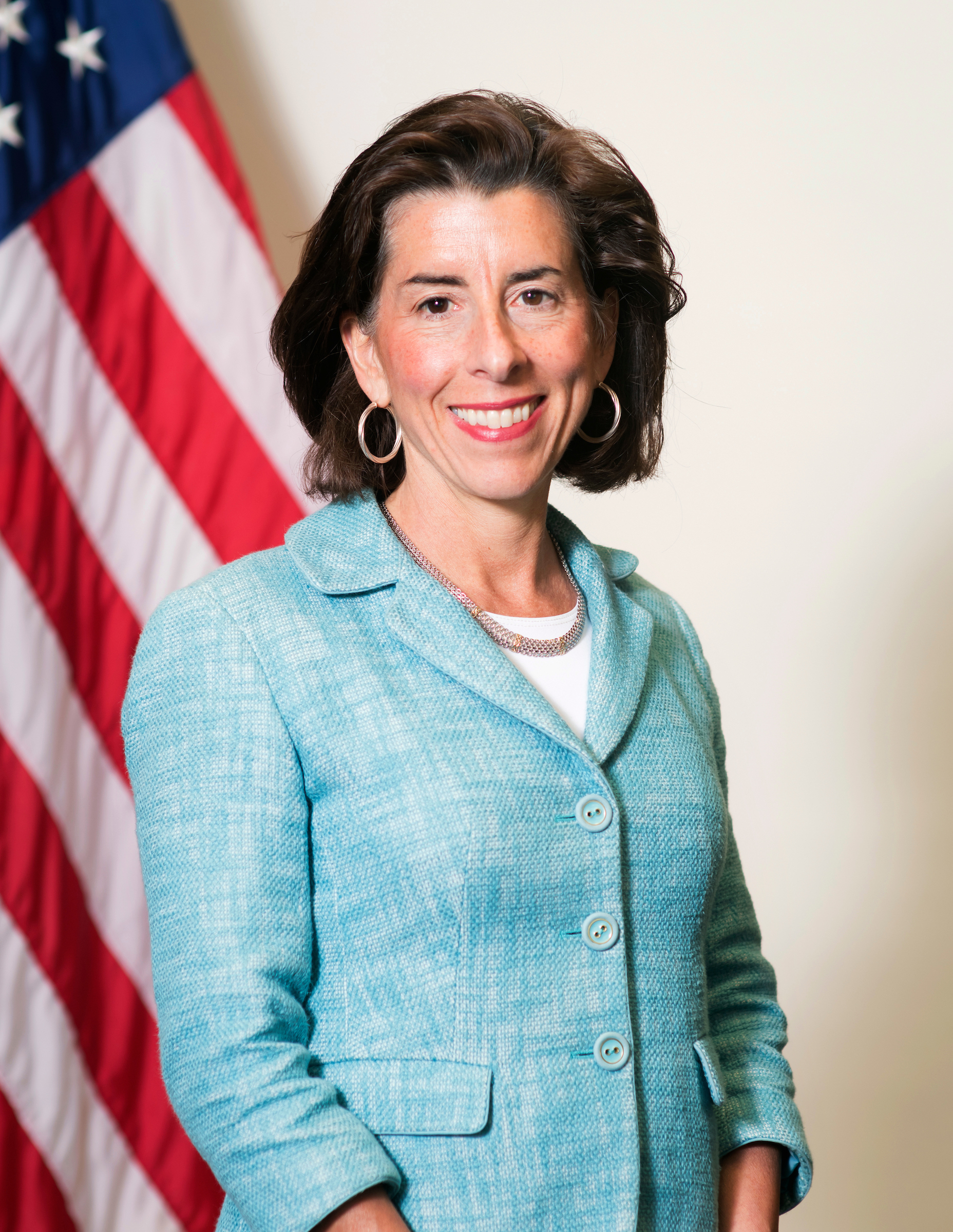
- Official portrait, 2021

40th United States Secretary of Commerce
- In office March 3, 2021 – January 20, 2025
- President: Joe Biden
- Deputy: Don Graves
- Preceded by: Wilbur Ross
- Succeeded by: Howard Lutnick

75th Governor of Rhode Island
- In office January 6, 2015 – March 2, 2021
- Lieutenant: Dan McKee
- Preceded by: Lincoln Chafee
- Succeeded by: Dan McKee

30th Treasurer of Rhode Island
- In office January 4, 2011 – January 6, 2015
- Governor: Lincoln Chafee
- Preceded by: Frank Caprio
- Succeeded by: Seth Magaziner

Personal details
- Born: Gina Marie Raimondo; May 17, 1971 (age 55) Smithfield, Rhode Island, U.S.
- Party: Democratic
- Spouse: Andrew Moffit (m. 2001)
- Children: 2
- Education: Harvard University (BA); New College, Oxford (MA, DPhil); Yale University (JD)
- Raimondo's voice Raimondo on workforce development Recorded September 9, 2022

Gina Marie Raimondo (/rəˈmɒndoʊ/; born May 17, 1971) is an American politician and businesswoman who served as the 40th United States secretary of commerce from 2021 to 2025. As a member of the Democratic Party, she served as the 75th governor of Rhode Island from 2015 to 2021 and was the first woman to serve in the role.

Born and raised in Rhode Island, Raimondo began her career in venture capital after law school. In 2000, she co-founded Point Judith Capital, Rhode Island's first venture capital firm. Raimondo entered politics in 2010, when she was elected General Treasurer of Rhode Island. During her first year in office, she prioritized reforming Rhode Island's public employee pension system.

In 2014, Raimondo was elected governor in a three-way contest with 41% of the vote. While in office, Raimondo was elected to serve as vice chair of the Democratic Governors Association (DGA) for the 2018 election cycle. Reelected in 2018, Raimondo was tasked with overseeing the state's initial response to the COVID-19 pandemic. In the 2020 presidential election, she served as co-chair of Michael Bloomberg's 2020 presidential campaign. During her tenure, Raimondo consistently maintained a negative net approval rating and was one of the least popular governors in the country.

Described as a "moderate technocrat" in The Washington Post, Raimondo is often characterized as a centrist within her party. Chosen to serve as Secretary of Commerce by President Joe Biden, she played a leading role in negotiations for the Infrastructure Investment and Jobs Act in 2021.

== Early life and education ==
Gina Marie Raimondo was born in 1971 in Smithfield, Rhode Island, where she later grew up. Born to a family of Italian descent, she is the youngest of Josephine (Piro) and Joseph Raimondo's three children. Her father, Joseph (1926–2014), made his career at the Bulova watch factory in Providence, Rhode Island; he became unemployed at 56 when the Bulova company moved its operations to China, shuttering the factory in Providence. U.S. Senator Jack Reed is a family friend.

Raimondo graduated from LaSalle Academy in Providence. She was one of the first girls allowed to attend the Catholic school, from which she was graduated as valedictorian. She went on to Harvard College, graduating magna cum laude in 1993 with a Bachelor of Arts degree in economics. While at Harvard, Raimondo resided in Quincy House and served on the staff of The Harvard Crimson. She played rugby at the Radcliffe Rugby Club, later joking that the experience "was good training for a career in politics".

A Rhodes Scholar, Raimondo attended New College, Oxford, where she received a Bachelor of Arts (later promoted to Master of Arts by seniority) and Doctor of Philosophy in 2002 in sociology. Her thesis on single motherhood was supervised by Stephen Nickell and Anne H. Gauthier while she was a postgraduate student of New College, Oxford. Raimondo received her Juris Doctor degree from Yale Law School in 1998. She has said that her experience working at housing and poverty clinics inspired her to attend law school.

== Early career ==
After graduating from law school, Raimondo served as a law clerk to federal judge Kimba Wood of the United States District Court for the Southern District of New York. Later, Raimondo acted as senior vice president for fund development at the Manhattan offices of Village Ventures, a venture capital firm based in Williamstown, Massachusetts, and backed by Bain Capital and Highland Capital Groups.

Raimondo returned to Rhode Island in 2001 to co-found the state's first venture capital firm, Point Judith Capital. Point Judith later relocated to Boston, Massachusetts. At Point Judith, Raimondo served as a general partner covering health care investments; she retains some executive duties with the firm. Under her leadership, Point Judith grew to over $100 million in assets and reportedly helped grow over 20 businesses.

== General Treasurer of Rhode Island (2011–2015) ==
=== 2010 election ===
In 2010, incumbent general treasurer Frank T. Caprio chose to run for governor rather than seek a second consecutive term in office. Describing the position of general treasurer as "a professional job, not a political job", Raimondo announced her candidacy for the position, her first campaign for elected office. In April 2010, former Democratic primary opponent Tom Sgouros dropped out of the race and endorsed Raimondo, leaving her as the only Democratic candidate.

Running a campaign that emphasized her business credentials, Raimondo pledged to "use the power as the chief investment officer to lean on banks to invest again". Her platform called for financial empowerment programs at senior centers and schools, and for protecting consumers from predatory lending and mortgages. On November 2, Raimondo was elected general treasurer, defeating Republican nominee Kernan F. King by a margin of 62% to 38%.

=== Tenure ===
During her first year as general treasurer, she prioritized reforming Rhode Island's public employee pension system, which was 48% funded in 2010. In April 2011, Raimondo led the state retirement board to reduce the state's assumed rate of return on pension investments from 8.25 percent to 7.5 percent.

In May 2011, Raimondo released "Truth in Numbers", a report that advocated benefit cuts as the solution to Rhode Island's pension problems, and she helped lead the effort to cut pensions, along with then-Speaker of the House Gordon Fox. The Rhode Island Retirement Security Act (RIRSA) was enacted by the General Assembly on November 17, 2012, with bipartisan support in both chambers. The next day, then-Governor Lincoln Chafee signed RIRSA into law. RIRSA's legality was challenged in court by the public employee unions, but a settlement was reached in June 2015.

Under Raimondo's tenure, the pension fund was criticized for underperforming when compared with its peers. Raimondo's critics attributed the underperformance to a sharp increase in fees paid to hedge fund managers, while her supporters argued investments in hedge funds stabilize investments during market downturns for more consistent returns over time.

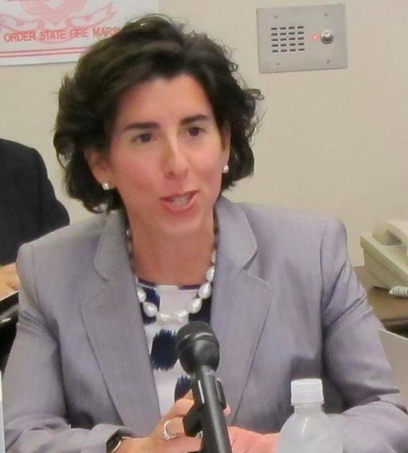
Raimondo in 2012

==== OSIP program ====
Raimondo created the Ocean State Investment Pool (OSIP), designed as a low-cost investment vehicle intended to help the state and municipalities better manage and improve the investment performance of their liquid assets, which are used for day-to-day operations including payroll and operating expenses. $500 million in funds could be eligible for the program, which would enable Treasury "to extend its expertise to municipalities and improve investment returns by creating economies of scale". The program officially launched on April 23, 2012. As of November 2021, the OSIP program is managed by Fidelity Investments.

==== Payday lending ====
During the Rhode Island General Assembly's 2012 session, Raimondo advocated for a decrease in the maximum allowable interest rate on payday loans in Rhode Island. She hosted a roundtable discussion with then-Providence mayor Angel Taveras and members of the Rhode Island Payday Reform Coalition.

Raimondo submitted letters to the Senate and House Corporations Committees in support of payday reform legislation. She wrote: "Far too many families are facing financial challenges that might be mitigated or avoided through a greater understanding of personal finance," and "payday loans exploit that lack of understanding ... With numerous economic challenges, Rhode Island should not permit the sale of a financial product that traps so many customers in a cycle of debt." Raimondo wrote an op-ed in the May 29, 2012 edition of The Providence Journal in support of payday lending reform.

== Governor of Rhode Island (2015–2021) ==
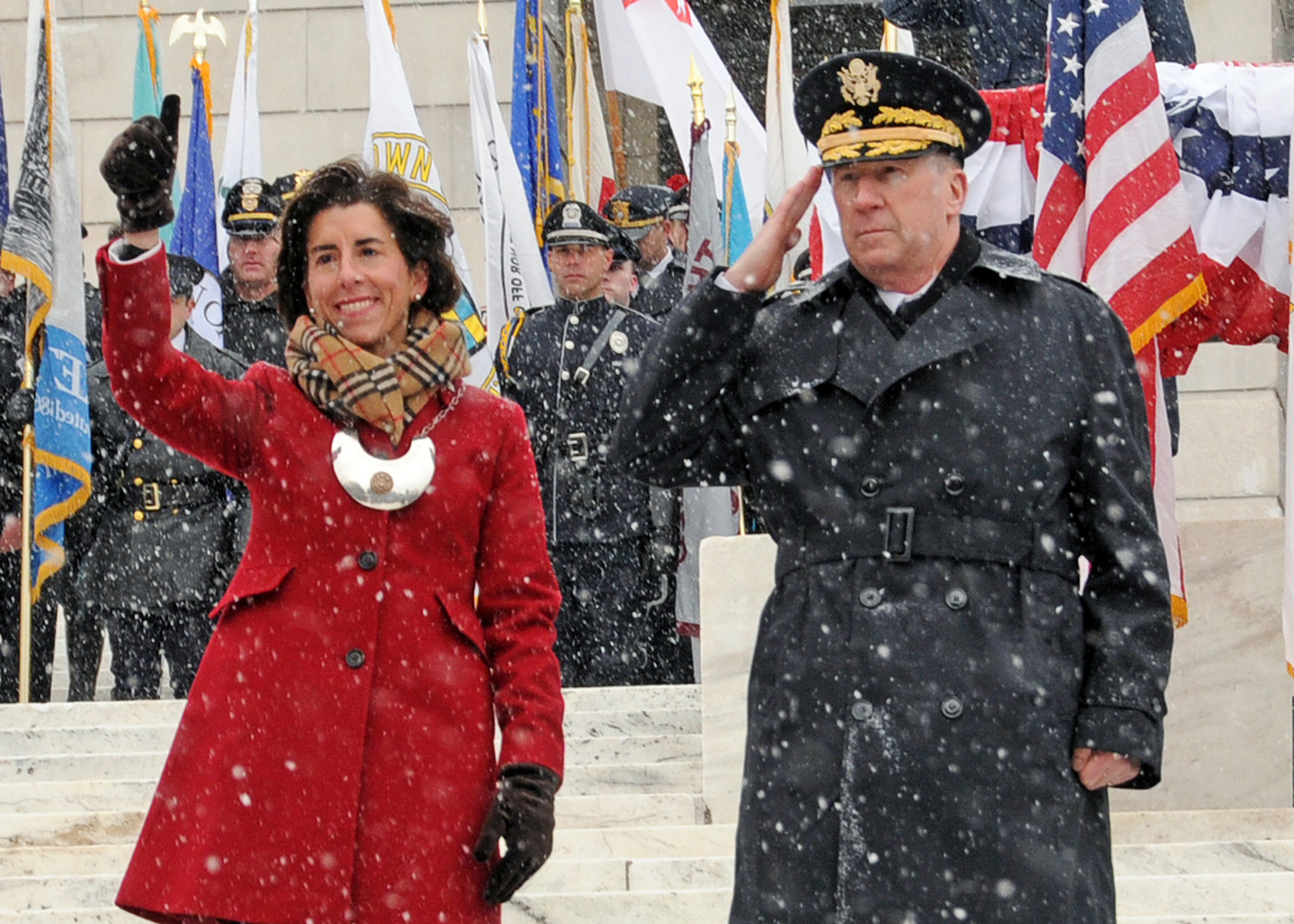
Raimondo at her inauguration in 2015

=== Elections ===
In 2014, Raimondo ran for governor of Rhode Island, and won a contested Democratic primary against Providence mayor Angel Taveras and former Department of Education official Clay Pell. On November 4, 2014, Raimondo won the general election with 41% of the vote in a three-way race versus Republican Allan Fung and Moderate Party nominee Robert J. Healey.

Raimondo was elected to serve as the vice chair of the Democratic Governors Association (DGA) for the 2018 election cycle. She was elected chair of the DGA in 2019. In 2018, Raimondo was reelected, defeating former secretary of state Matt Brown in the Democratic primary and Republican nominee Fung in the general election. Her reelection made her the first candidate to secure a majority of votes for that office since 2006.

=== Tenure ===
Raimondo was the first female governor of Rhode Island, and one of nine incumbent female governors in the United States at the time of her resignation in order to become the United States Secretary of Commerce. During her tenure as governor, she was credited with cutting taxes every year and removed eight thousand pages of regulations—30% of the state's regulations. She raised the state minimum wage to $11.50, created a sick-leave entitlement, financed the largest infrastructure program in the state's history, and made community colleges tuition-free. Raimondo appointed more judges of color than any of her predecessors, including Melissa A. Long, the first Black woman to serve on the Rhode Island Supreme Court.

As governor, Raimondo presided over Rhode Island's initial response to the COVID-19 pandemic. On March 28, 2020, New York Governor Andrew Cuomo threatened Raimondo with a lawsuit over a new state quarantine policy that would require people from New York, which had been hit hard by the COVID-19 pandemic, to self-quarantine for 14 days upon arrival in Rhode Island. On March 29, Raimondo repealed the order that specifically referred to New Yorkers, broadened it to include any out-of-state traveler entering Rhode Island with intent to stay. During the pandemic, Rhode Island had the nation's highest per capita levels of testing for COVID-19. In November 2020, she issued guidance limiting gatherings to 10 people, imposed a 10 pm curfew on businesses, and required masks outside when with people outside of one's own household.

==== Approval ratings ====
Between assuming office and the end of 2019, Raimondo consistently ranked toward the bottom of approval ratings for U.S. governors, and was occasionally ranked the nation's least popular governor. During the COVID-19 pandemic, polling found that Raimondo's approval ratings had jumped significantly for her handling of the crisis, polling at roughly 75%. This was identified as part of a nationwide rally 'round the flag effect that saw nearly every state governor's approval ratings significantly improve.

==== Statewide computer system rollout controversy ====
A widely criticized rollout of a new computer network system for the Rhode Island Executive Office of Health and Human Services dubbed the "Unified Health Infrastructure Project" (UHIP) in September 2016 saw scores of people without access to government programs such as food stamps and child care due to glitches in the software, designed by Deloitte. This computer crash created a backlog of more than 20,000 cases. The Raimondo administration received several letters from the federal government in August and September 2016, warning that UHIP was not ready to be launched. On Raimondo's orders, the UHIP launch occurred as planned despite these warnings.

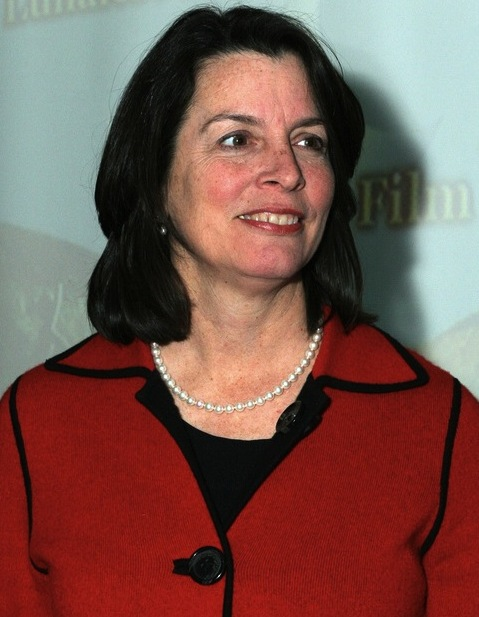
Elizabeth H. Roberts, who resigned as Secretary of Health and Human Services due to the statewide computer system rollout

In response, U.S. Food and Nutrition Service's Northeast Regional Administrator Kurt Messner urged Raimondo to postpone the launch because it would interrupt or interfere with benefits the agency oversees. Messner said in his letter, which local news outlets called "strongly-worded", that "the transition plan remains inadequate and unacceptable." He also wrote that the state had not launched UHIP in phases or administered a live pilot test. "Launching a system without having conducted a live pilot is against the intent of the regulations and against our best advice", Messner wrote. The Raimondo administration ignored the warnings, resulting in benefit delays, system downtime, and benefit loss caused in error.

In December 2016, the federal government gave the state Department of Human Services less than a month to fix the UHIP computer system, or risk losing $13 million in federal funding. Federal officials judged that the state was not compliant in lowering a significant case backlog, establishing a sufficient call-center, providing adequate staff training, and improving wait times at Health and Human Services field offices. In February 2017, Executive Secretary of Health and Human Services Elizabeth H. Roberts resigned from her cabinet post in the Raimondo administration due to the failed roll-out of the UHIP.

In March 2017, Rhode Island Monthly reported that the U.S. Department of Justice had opened an investigation into UHIP, specifically false claims and statements made about the Health and Human Services computer network rollout. The investigation was still underway in the summer of 2017. In an interview, House Oversight Chair Patricia Serpa said: "There's plenty of blame to go around. The auditor's report found that [the contract with Deloitte] was poorly written, poorly overseen and poorly executed. They were warned against the implementation because the system was not ready. Not only did they implement it, they displaced all of the most senior workers with the wealth of experience. We pulled all the plugs to make sure this was a failure."

According to documents submitted to the federal government, the cost estimate for UHIP through 2021 was $656 million. State taxpayers would pay $154 million of this and the federal government the remainder. In January 2020, State Senator Sam Bell said a Rhode Island Senate Fiscal Report on Raimondo's budget proved that "a single UHIP update kicked 5,500 Rhode Islanders off their Medicaid" in November 2019 without due process and the decisions were based on a computer update. Bell added: "Medicaid terminations need to be done with some due process. They should not come from a notoriously glitchy computer system. You should have a chance to fight the decision to rip away your health insurance. When you lose your Medicaid with no warning and no effort to transition you onto the exchange, the consequences can be deadly."

==== DCYF controversies ====
Under Raimondo, the Rhode Island Department of Children, Youth & Families (DCYF) had come under fire for the rate of deaths and near-deaths of children in its care. Between January 2016 and December 2017, there were 31 fatalities or near fatalities of children in its care, with eight being confirmed fatal. Raimondo appointed Trista Piccola as her new DCYF director in January 2017. Piccola's term was marked by the death and near-deaths of children, high staff turnover, votes of no confidence, and high budget deficits. Rep. Patricia Serpa and Rep. Charlene Lima called for Piccola's resignation, which finally occurred in July 2019.

In October 2018, the United States Department of Health and Human Services' Administration for Children and Families ordered the Raimondo administration's DCYF to improve in 33 of 36 areas assessed. The federal report noted that DCYF services were "inadequate, not developed when needed, or lacked consistent monitoring". Harvard Kennedy School professor and former Obama administration official Jeffrey Liebman agreed with the recommendations and analysis of the report from the U.S. Department of Health and Human Services and claimed that the DCYF was "the most messed-up agency ever".

With Piccola's departure, the interim director is DCYF executive legal counsel Kevin Aucoin. Aucoin has served in an interim director capacity twice before when DCYF was without a permanent director. Secretary of the Rhode Island Executive Office of Health and Human Services and Raimondo cabinet member Womazetta Jones said in December 2019 that she was "very determined to stay the course of not hiring anybody unless it's the right person". As of December 2020 DCYF does not have a permanent director.

During Raimondo's tenure as governor, the DCYF has focused on shifting children from congregate settings to licensed foster homes. DCYF has increased its capacity and utilization of licensed foster homes, including an increase in the number of licensed kinship families, from 280 in October 2019 to 576 in June 2020. In December 2020, 83% of all children placed in out-of-home care were placed in a foster home. Since 2015, the department's intensive reforms have resulted in a 43% reduction in the number of youth placed in congregate care and a 39% reduction in the number of youth placed in out-of-state congregate care. At the same time, the department has increased the number of children placed in licensed foster family homes.

==== Guns ====
Raimondo campaigned in 2014 to enact a variety of gun control legislation and acted on her promises during her tenure. Following the Parkland shooting in 2018, Raimondo enacted a red flag and bump stock ban. Raimondo's first bill of the Covid-19 era in June 2020, banned the sale, manufacture, and possession of nonmetal homemade firearms, also known as 3D-printed guns.

== National politics ==
In early February 2020, Raimondo appeared alongside former Republican New York City Mayor and Democratic presidential hopeful Michael Bloomberg at the Wexford Innovation Center in Providence to endorse his candidacy, a move she described as "an easy call". Raimondo was named a national co-chair for the Bloomberg campaign.

Press secretary Jennifer Bogdan Jones of the Governor's Office told The Providence Journal that Raimondo "is prepared to do whatever it takes to support Mike and defeat President Trump." As campaign co-chair, Raimondo would have "provided advice and attended events". Less than a month later, Bloomberg dropped out of the race and endorsed former Vice President Joe Biden. On the same day, Raimondo also endorsed Biden. She said Bloomberg "obviously" performed poorly on the debate stage but supporting his candidacy "was an easy decision for me at the beginning. But [supporting Biden] is an easy decision, too." Raimondo concluded that it was now time "to unify behind Joe Biden".

In May 2020, Washington Post writer George Will wrote in favor of Raimondo being chosen as Biden's running mate in the 2020 election.

In April 2025, Raimondo said she is thinking of running for President of the United States in 2028.

== Secretary of Commerce (2021–2025) ==
=== Nomination and confirmation ===
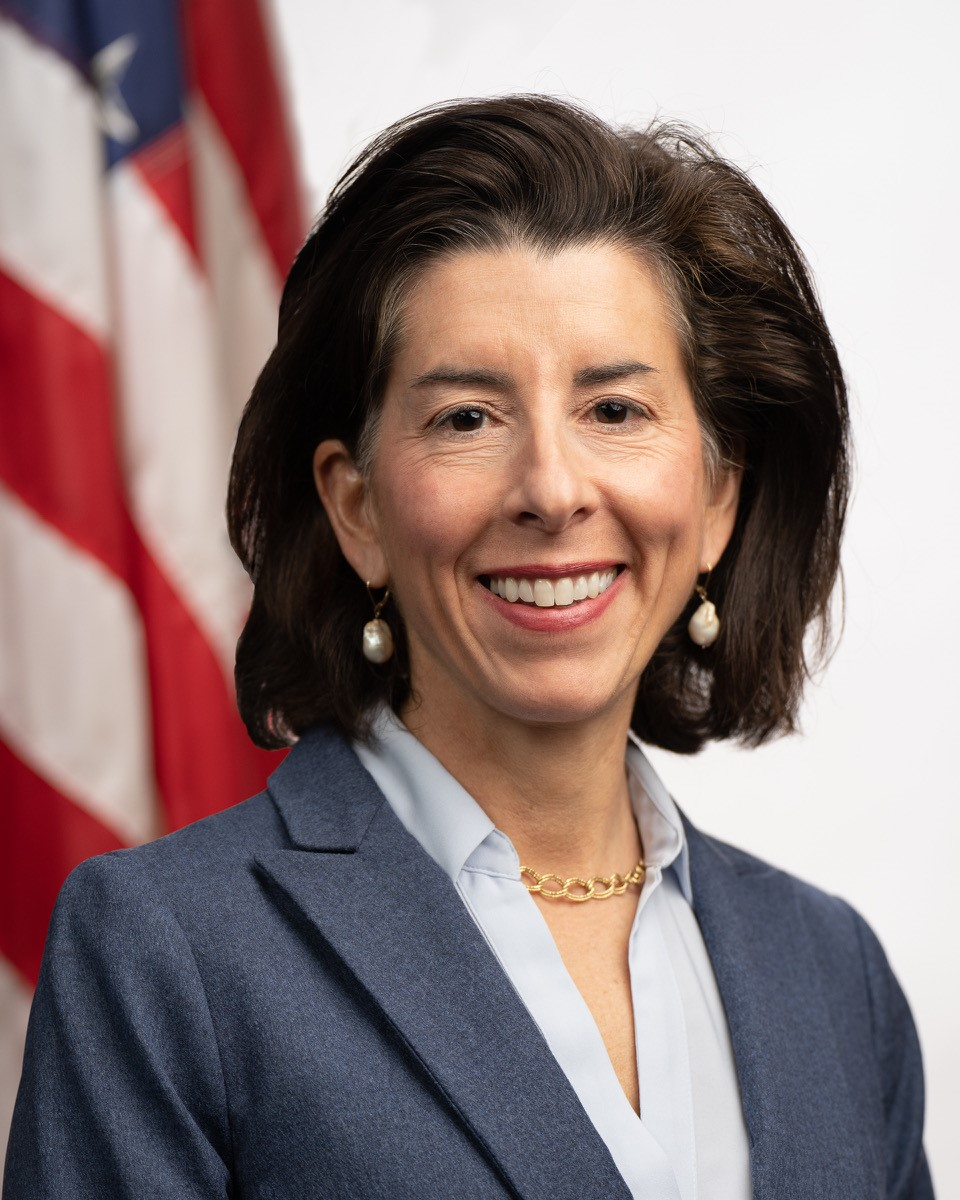
First official portrait of Secretary of Commerce Gina Raimondo

Following the 2020 United States presidential election, Raimondo was routinely mentioned as a possible cabinet secretary in the incoming Biden administration. Though first seen as a likely Secretary of Health and Human Services, Raimondo announced on December 3, 2020, that she would not be taking that role. She was also considered for Secretary of the Treasury.

On January 7, 2021, Biden announced he would nominate Raimondo to serve as Secretary of Commerce. She appeared before the Senate Committee on Commerce, Science and Transportation on January 26. On March 1, the Senate voted 84–15 in favor of cloture on the nomination, and confirmed Raimondo to the position the following day by a vote of 84–15.

=== Tenure ===
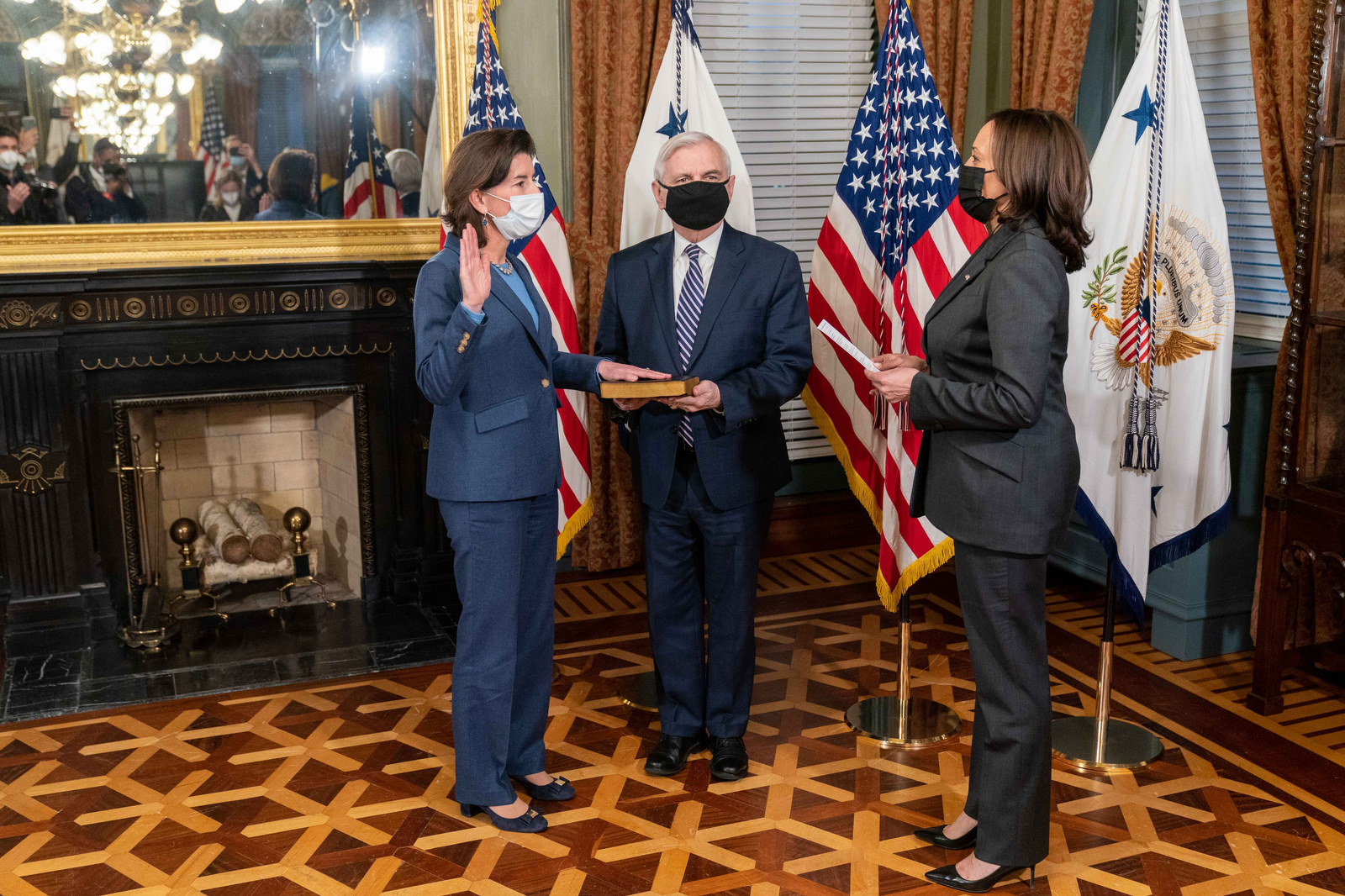
Vice President Kamala Harris swears in Gina Raimondo as Secretary of Commerce Wednesday, March 3, 2021

Raimondo was sworn in by Vice President Kamala Harris on March 3, 2021. In August 2021, Politico reported that Raimondo had become one of the "administration's secret weapons on the Hill" in her role as a negotiator for the Infrastructure Investment and Jobs Act. Raimondo was the only Cabinet member not to attend Biden's first State of the Union address on March 1, 2022, since she was chosen as the designated survivor.

Raimondo's approach has drawn praise from centrists, with a Washington Post opinion article praising her as a "technocratic moderate in a moment when her party’s loudest voices are woke, populist and a step or two to her left". In office, Raimondo has been noted for her willingness to work with corporate executives, and was described by Axios as "Tech's Favorite Biden Official". Time called her the federal government's "point woman on AI [policy]". An analysis of Raimondo's schedule in office found that she held at least 101 meetings with representatives from Wall Street firms in her first two years in office.

In 2022, Raimondo was rumored to be a potential candidate to succeed Janet Yellen as Secretary of the Treasury in the aftermath of that year's midterms. This speculation attracted criticism from some progressives due to her status as a political moderate. Senator Elizabeth Warren told The New York Times that she had "real concerns about the department's approach, whether it's approving assault weapon sales, negotiating trade deals or supporting big tech companies".

During Raimondo's tenure, the Department of Commerce sanctioned NSO Group for selling spyware technology. As secretary of commerce, Raimondo has worked with other administration officials, such as Secretary of Homeland Security Alejandro Mayorkas, on coordinating cybersecurity policy. In March 2021, she issued subpoenas to several China-based telecommunications firms, arguing that "unrestricted use of untrusted ICTS poses a national security risk". Raimondo has been a co-chair of the Trade and Technology Council since its creation in 2021.

According to Axios, "Raimondo has become the [tech] industry's key advocate within the Biden administration". She has been criticized by some progressives for opposing the European Commission's Digital Markets Act (DMA) proposal. In December 2021, Raimondo voiced concern that the DMA would unfairly impact U.S.-based tech companies such as Google and Apple. An analysis of her calendar found that, during her first two years in office, she had met with twice as many executives and lobbyists from Big Tech companies as her predecessor, Wilbur Ross, had during his four-year term in office.

During a luncheon hosted by the Chamber of Commerce, she argued the DMA "disproportionately impact[s] US-based tech firms". She was criticized by Senator Elizabeth Warren, who argued that her comments contradicted the Biden administration's efforts "to protect consumers and workers from Big Tech monopolies". In March 2022, Warren accused Raimondo of "lobbying on behalf of Big Tech".

In September 2024, Raimondo stated on MSNBC's "Morning Joe" regarding former President Donald Trump, "Let's extinguish him for good. . . . Vote him out, banish him from American politics.” The Trump campaign accused her of encouraging Trump’s assassination.

Raimondo spoke at a convening of the International Network of AI Safety Institutes in San Francisco on November 20, 2024. The attendees included Australia, Canada, Japan, the United Kingdom, and the European Union. Raimondo brought up the existential risk from artificial intelligence in her speech, and asked "Why would we choose to allow AI to replace us? Why would we choose to allow the deployment of AI that will cause widespread unemployment and societal disruption that goes along with it?".

==== Universal basic income and AI-driven unemployment ====
Raimondo has opposed universal basic income (UBI) as a response to technology-driven job displacement, even while warning that artificial intelligence could put large numbers of people out of work. During a September 2023 event at the Gerald R. Ford School of Public Policy at the University of Michigan, Raimondo said that without large-scale job training and apprenticeship programs, “whether it's AI or digitization or online sales, people are gonna be put out of work.” She immediately added, “I am not in favor of universal basic income. Give people jobs and pay them decent wages. And to say we can't figure that out, I think is a cop out.”

Raimondo reiterated her opposition to UBI in April 2026 while discussing the prospect of AI-driven layoffs. In an interview reported by Axios, she called UBI a “cop out” and “bad policy,” while also saying she was “nervous about the 2- to 5-year outlook” because she expected “a lot of layoffs pretty fast across the economy.” She argued instead for policies encouraging companies to retrain and redeploy workers, with Axios describing her position as a “pro-innovation, anti-UBI lane on AI.”

Concerns about large-scale AI displacement have continued to feature in Raimondo's workforce policy. In June 2026, the Associated Press reported that estimates cited by the newly formed RAISE US included a Boston Consulting Group analysis suggesting that as many as 25 million U.S. jobs could be eliminated over five years. Raimondo, a founder of RAISE US, warned that a sufficiently high level of unemployment could “destabilize our country and our democracy.” The organization has emphasized retraining, education, employer incentives, and job-transition programs rather than UBI. In June 2026, Raimondo also became co-chair of a bipartisan commission convened by the Urban Institute and American Enterprise Institute to study AI's effects on jobs, wages, and skills; she said the response should focus on “the right training” and “the right transition infrastructure.”

==== Chip policy ====
As secretary of commerce, Raimondo has helped lead the U.S. response to the global chip shortage and has urged Congress to pass legislation to boost domestic semiconductor manufacturing. She argued that the chip shortage presents a national and economic security threat to U.S. interests. Raimondo was criticized in an opinion piece published in The Hill for using CHIPS funding for DEI initiatives, specifically chip-making training programs at historically black colleges and universities. As secretary of commerce, Raimondo has advanced rules to prevent companies like Nvidia from exporting advanced AI chip technologies to China.

In July 2023, it was reported that Raimondo's government email account was hacked in a breach that originated in China.

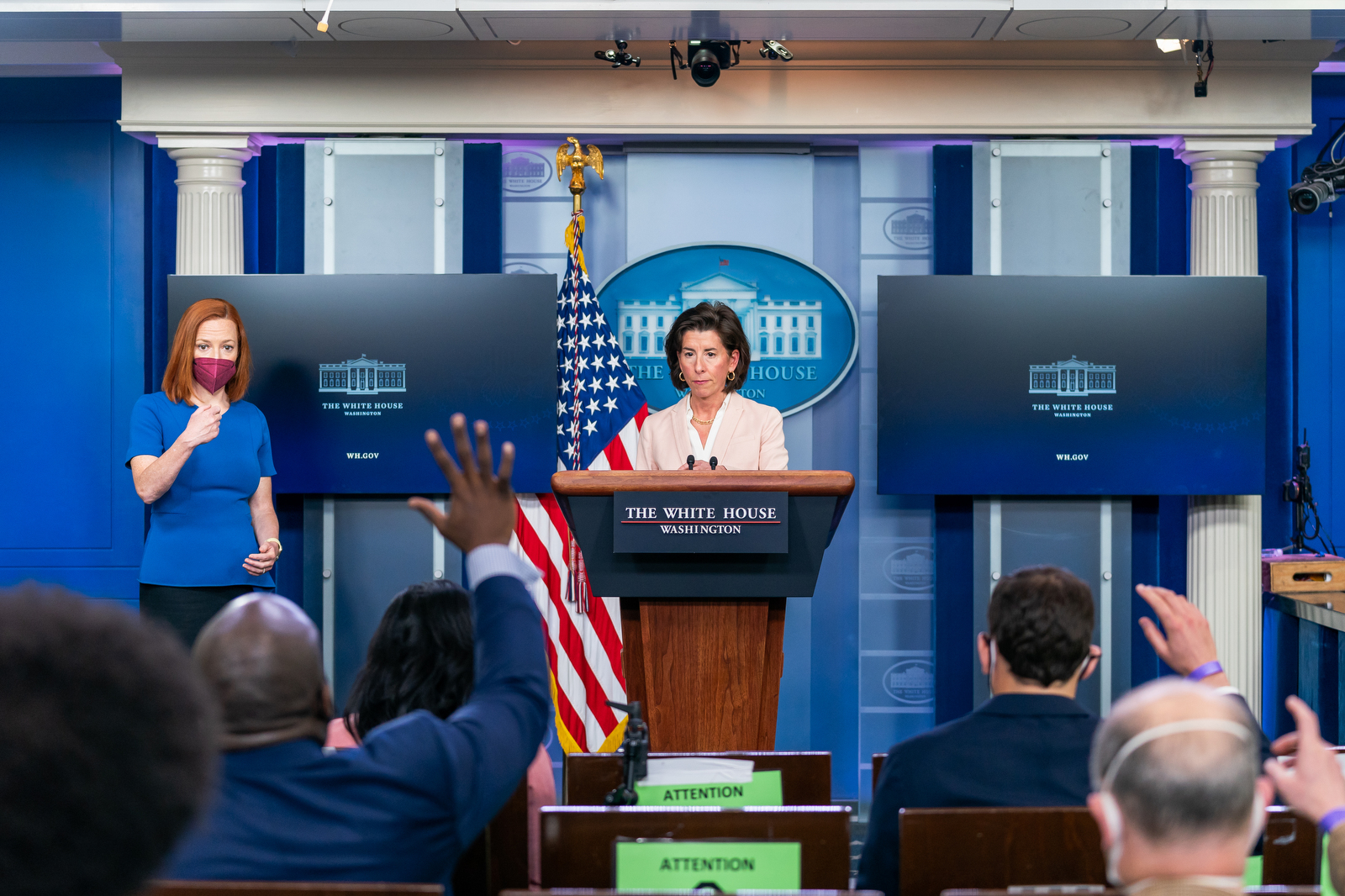
Raimondo answers questions with Press Secretary Jen Psaki in the White House briefing room, April 2021

==== Foreign relations ====
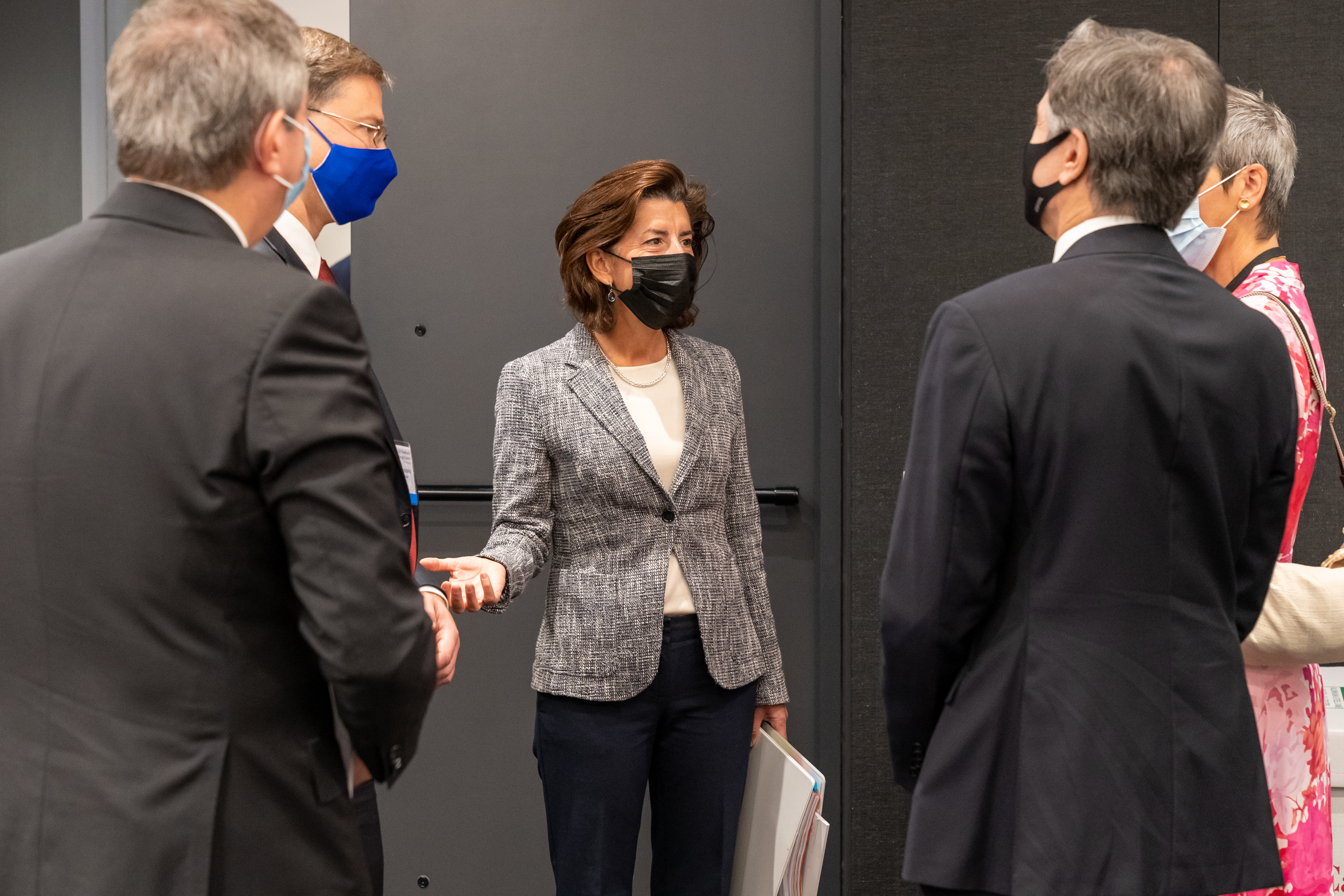
Gina Raimondo with Antony Blinken, Stavros Lambrinidis, Margrethe Vestager, and Valdis Dombrovskis, before the inaugural U.S.-EU Trade and Technology Council (TTC)

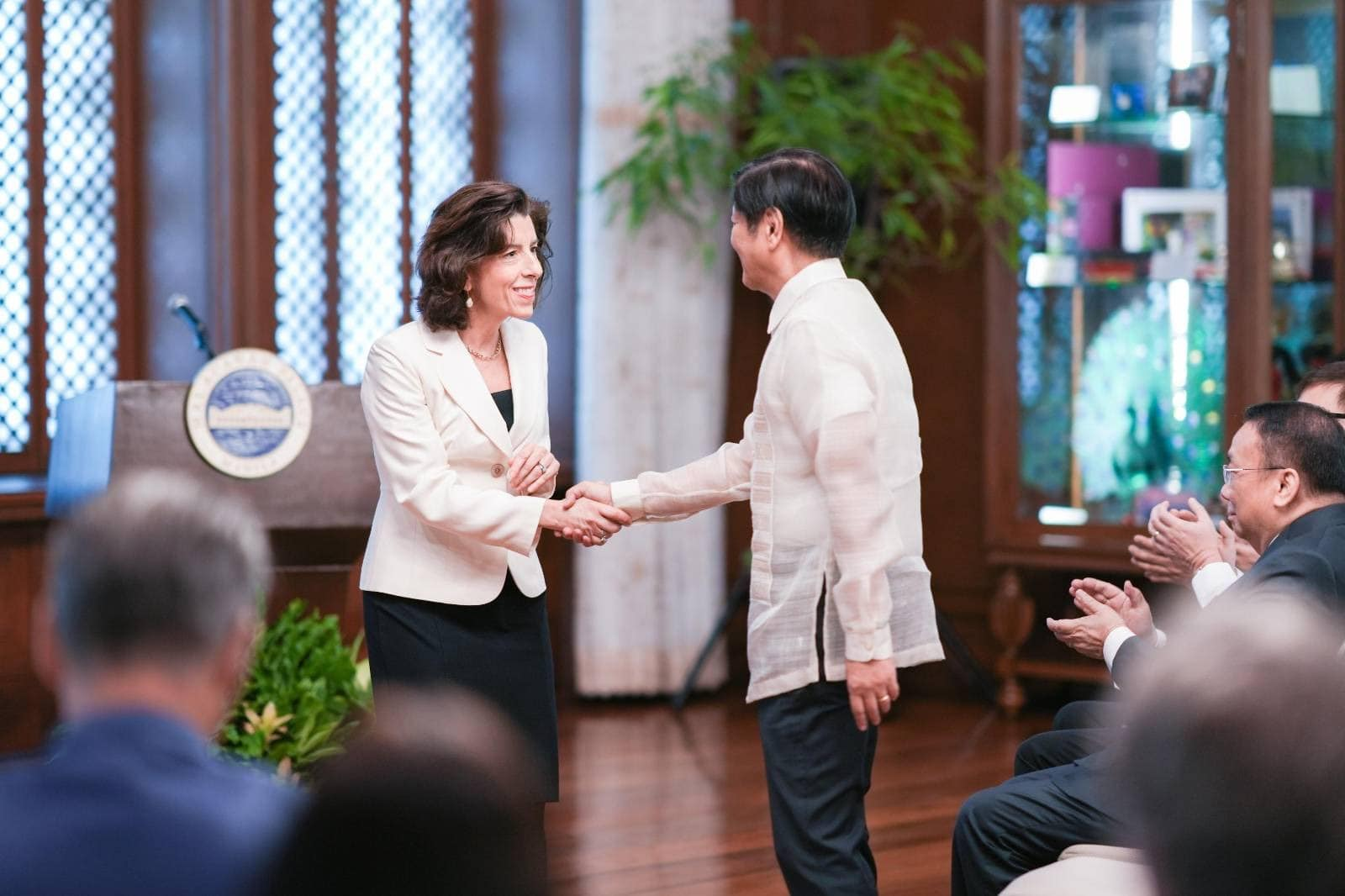
Gina Raimondo with Philippine President Bongbong Marcos

In September 2021, Raimondo accused China of violating the intellectual property (IP) rights of U.S. companies, and said that the Chinese government had put in place "all kinds of different barriers for American companies to do business in China." In October 2021, Senator Tom Cotton criticized her for saying "there's no point in talking about decoupling our economy from China's".

Following the 2022 Russian invasion of Ukraine, the Department of Commerce under Raimondo implemented export controls in order to restrict Russia's access to military technology. In March 2022, Raimondo said that Chinese companies attempting to sell semiconductor technology to Russia in violation of U.S. sanctions would face repercussions.

From August 27 to 30, 2023, Raimondo visited China, where she met with the minister of culture and tourism Hu Heping, minister of commerce Wang Wentao, vice premier He Lifeng, and premier Li Qiang. She also visited Shanghai, where she met with Shanghai Communist Party secretary Chen Jining and visited Shanghai Disneyland. During the meeting, the two sides announced a working group on commercial issues and an export control enforcement "information exchange" dialogue. During an October 2023 trip to Abu Dhabi, she raised concerns about G42's ties to China.

On March 11, 2024, on the United States Presidential Trade Mission to the Philippines, Raimondo met Alfredo E. Pascual and Assistant to the President for Investment and Economic Affairs Frederick Go at Solaire Resort & Casino and said, "On this trip alone, these 22 company heads in the delegation are announcing over $1 billion of U.S. investments, including educational [and training] opportunities to over 30 million Filipinos in the form of digital upskilling, artificial intelligence upskilling, and digital training."

==== Response to port strike ====
On October 1, 2024, the International Longshoremen's Association struck 37 ports in the eastern and south central U.S., curtailing import and export activity between the U.S. and its trade partners. Raimondo was criticized for an interview the previous day on CNBC's Squawk Box in which she acknowledged that the strike "could be very disruptive to commerce" but said she was not focused on the issue and "not particularly involved", referring questions to the White House and Transportation Secretary.

== Post-Biden administration ==
In January 2025, Raimondo joined the Council on Foreign Relations as a distinguished fellow. In April 2025, Raimondo joined the advisory board for Bloomberg New Economy as its chair.

In November of 2025, Raimondo was appointed Co-Chair of New Jersey Governor-elect Mikie Sherrill’s “Driving New Jersey Forward: Economic Development and Innovation” committee.

In 2026, Raimondo became the CEO of RAISE US, a non-profit organization which aims to address the disruption to American workers caused by artificial intelligence.. The non-profit is backed, and largely funded, by prominent members of big tech such as Anthropic, Microsoft, Amazon and OpenAI, and has prominently spoken out against the idea of universal basic income as a solution to AI-driven job loss, preferring to fund retraining programs.. Raimondo has said previously, prior to becoming CEO of RAISE US, that past federal efforts focused on retraining in response to job loss were ineffective..

== Electoral history ==
=== 2010 General Treasurer election ===
2010 Rhode Island General Treasurer Election
Primary election
Party	Candidate	Votes	%
Democratic	Gina Raimondo	69,645	100.00
Total votes		69,645	100
General election
Democratic	Gina Raimondo	201,625	62.14
Republican	Kernan King	122,860	37.86
Total votes		324,485	100

=== 2014 gubernatorial election ===
2014 Rhode Island Governor Election
Primary election
Party	Candidate	Votes	%
Democratic	Gina Raimondo	53,990	42.15
Democratic	Angel Taveras	37,326	29.14
Democratic	Clay Pell	34,515	26.94
Democratic	Todd Giroux	2,264	1.77
Total votes		128,095	100
General election
Democratic	Gina Raimondo	131,899	40.70
Republican	Allan Fung	117,428	36.28
Moderate	Robert J. Healey	69,278	21.38
Independent	Kate L. Fletcher	3,483	1.07
Independent	Leon M. Kayarian	1,228	0.38
Write-in		739	0.23
Total votes		324,055	100

=== 2018 gubernatorial election ===
2018 Rhode Island Governor Election
Primary election
Party	Candidate	Votes	%
Democratic	Gina Raimondo (incumbent)	67,370	57.15
Democratic	Matthew A. Brown	39,518	33.53
Democratic	Spencer Dickinson	10,987	9.32
Total votes		117,875	100
General election
Democratic	Gina Raimondo (incumbent)	198,122	52.64
Republican	Allan Fung	139,932	37.18
Independent	Joe Trillo	16,532	4.39
Moderate	William H. Gilbert	10,155	2.70
Independent	Luis Daniel Munoz	6,223	1.65
Compassion	Anne Armstrong	4,191	1.11
Write-in		1,246	0.33
Total votes		376,401	100

== Personal life and recognition ==
On December 1, 2001, Raimondo married Andrew Kind Moffit, in Providence. The couple have two children. The family resides on the east side of Providence. Raimondo is a practicing Catholic and was one of the first girls to graduate from the La Salle Academy, a Catholic school in Providence.

Raimondo is a member of the Council on Foreign Relations (CFR) and an Aspen Institute Rodel fellow. She was awarded an honorary degree from Bryant University in 2012 and has received awards from the northern Rhode Island chamber of commerce and the YWCA of northern Rhode Island. Raimondo was elected alumni fellow of Yale in 2014.

On January 27, 2025, CFR announced that Raimondo will join the Council as a DC-based distinguished fellow, co-chairing its Task Force on economic security.

=== Community service ===
Raimondo serves as vice chair of the board of directors of Crossroads Rhode Island, the state's largest homeless services organization. Until 2011, she was an administrator of Women and Infants Hospital and chair of its Quality Committee. She has served on the boards of La Salle Academy and Family Service of Rhode Island.

== See also ==
- List of female governors in the United States
- List of female United States Cabinet members
- COVID-19 pandemic in Rhode Island

Party political offices
Preceded by Frank Caprio	Democratic nominee for Treasurer of Rhode Island; 2010	Succeeded by Seth Magaziner
Preceded by Frank Caprio	Democratic nominee for Governor of Rhode Island; 2014, 2018	Succeeded by Dan McKee
Preceded by Jay Inslee	Chair of the Democratic Governors Association; 2018–2019	Succeeded by Phil Murphy
Political offices
Preceded by Frank Caprio	Treasurer of Rhode Island; 2011–2015	Succeeded by Seth Magaziner
Preceded by Lincoln Chafee	Governor of Rhode Island; 2015–2021	Succeeded by Daniel McKee
Preceded by Wilbur Ross	United States Secretary of Commerce; 2021–2025	Succeeded by Howard Lutnick
U.S. order of precedence (ceremonial)
Preceded by Miguel Cardona as Former U.S. Cabinet Member	Order of precedence of the United States as Former U.S. Cabinet Member	Succeeded by Marcia Fudge as Former U.S. Cabinet Member
