= 2018 Rhode Island gubernatorial election =

- November 6, 2018
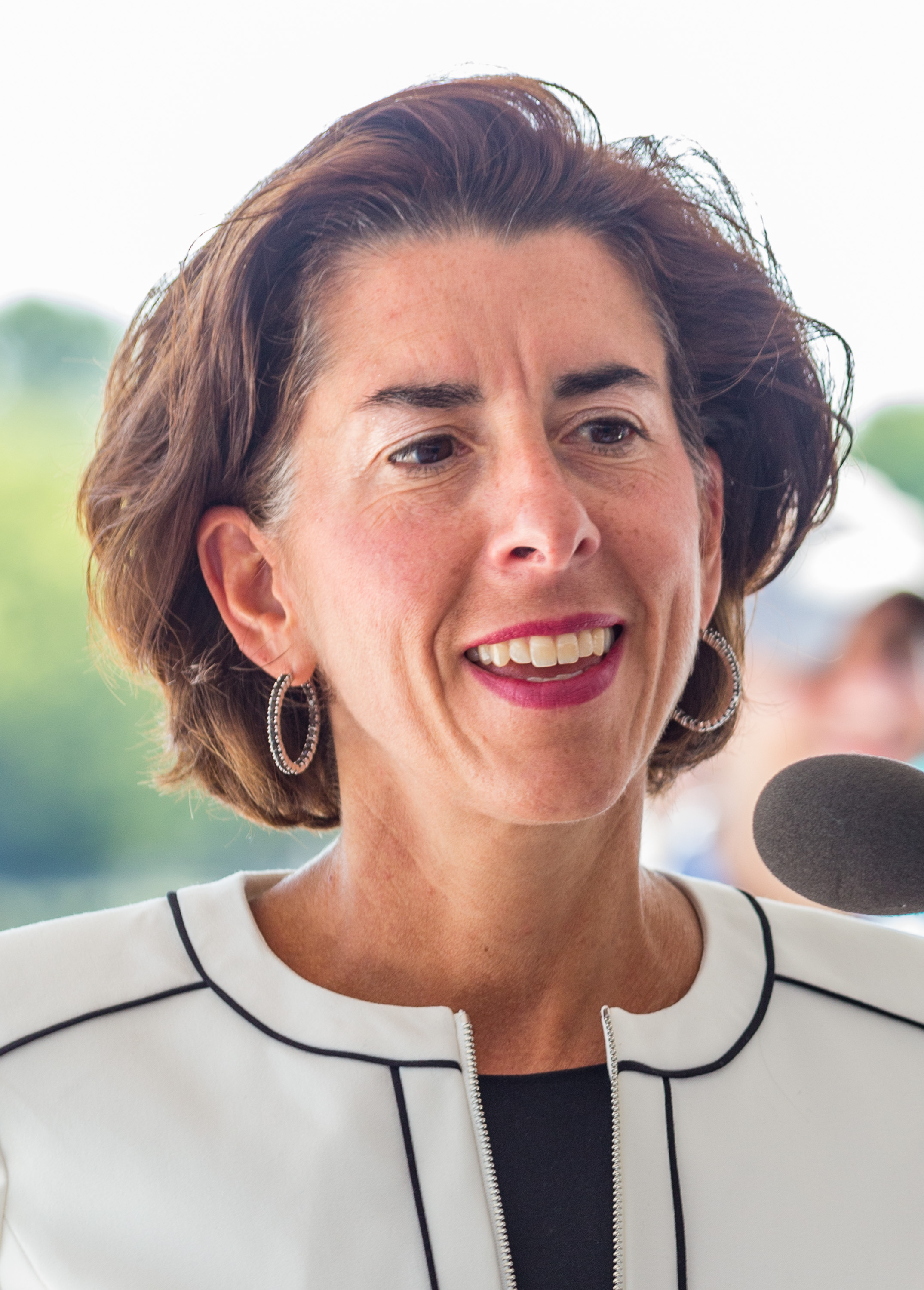

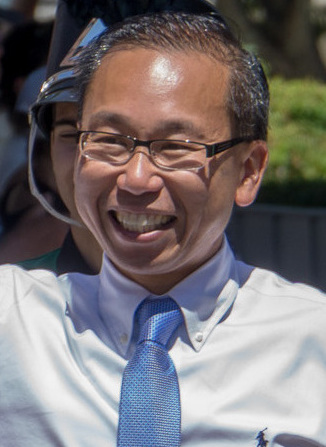
Nominee	Gina Raimondo	Allan Fung
Party	Democratic	Republican
Popular vote	198,122	139,932
Percentage	52.64%	37.18%
- Raimondo: 40–50% 50–60% 60–70% 70–80% 80–90% >90% Fung: 40–50% 50–60% 60–70% 70–80%
Governor before election
Gina Raimondo
Democratic
Elected Governor
Gina Raimondo
Democratic

The 2018 Rhode Island gubernatorial election was held on November 6, 2018, to elect the governor of Rhode Island, concurrently with the election of Rhode Island's Class I U.S. Senate seat, as well as other elections to the United States Senate in other states, elections to the United States House of Representatives, and various state and local elections.

On September 12, 2018, incumbent governor Gina Raimondo and Cranston mayor and 2014 gubernatorial nominee Allan Fung won the Democratic and Republican primaries respectively, facing each other in a rematch of the 2014 election. Raimondo defeated Fung in the general election on November 6 to win a second term as governor, improving on her plurality win in 2014 to earn a majority of the votes, and becoming the first gubernatorial candidate (incumbent or challenger) to win a majority of votes since Donald Carcieri in 2006. It was also the first time that a Democrat was re-elected as Governor of Rhode Island since Bruce Sundlun won a second term in 1992, and the first time ever they did so for four-year terms.

== Democratic primary ==
=== Candidates ===
==== Nominated ====
- Gina Raimondo, incumbent governor

==== Eliminated in primary ====
- Matt Brown, former Secretary of State of Rhode Island and candidate for U.S. Senate in 2006
- Spencer Dickinson, former state representative

==== Withdrawn ====
- Paul Roselli, president of the Burrillville Land Trust (running for State Senate Dist. 23) (endorsed Matt Brown)

==== Declined ====
- Lincoln Chafee, former governor and candidate for president of the United States in 2016
- James Langevin, U.S. representative
- Daniel McKee, lieutenant governor (running for reelection)
- Angel Taveras, former mayor of Providence and candidate for governor in 2014

=== Endorsements ===
Matt Brown

Statewide politicians

- Lincoln Chafee, former US senator and former governor

Local officials

- Jeanine Calkin, state senator
- Lauren Niedel, Rhode Island Democratic Party State Committeewoman

Individuals

- Capri Catanzaro, political director of Rhode Island Progressive Democrats
- Andrea James-Gomez, Youth & Programs director of Rhode Island for Community & Justice
- Kate Michelman, former president of NARAL Pro-Choice America
- Barbara Roberts, director, Women's Cardiac Center, the Miriam Hospital
- Paul Roselli, president of Burrillville Land Trust, candidate for state senate, withdrawn Democratic candidate for governor
- Gloria Steinem, feminist, journalist, and social political activist

Organizations

- Climate Action RI
- IndivisibleRI
- Justice Democrats
- Our Revolution RI
- RI Progressive Democrats

=== Results ===
Results by county Map legend: Raimondo—40–50%; Raimondo—50–60%; Raimondo—60–70%

Results by municipality Raimondo: Raimondo—40–50%; Raimondo—50–60%; Raimondo—60–70%; Raimondo—70–80%; Brown: Brown—40–50%; Brown—60–70%

Democratic primary results
Party	Candidate	Votes	%
Democratic	Gina Raimondo (incumbent)	66,978	57.1
Democratic	Matt Brown	39,300	33.5
Democratic	Spencer Dickinson	10,926	9.3
Total votes		117,204	100.0

== Republican primary ==
=== Candidates ===
==== Nominated ====
- Allan Fung, mayor of Cranston and nominee for governor in 2014

==== Eliminated in primary ====
- Giovanni Feroce, businessman, former state senator and nominee for lieutenant governor in 1994
- Patricia Morgan, minority leader of the Rhode Island House of Representatives

==== Declined ====
- Robert Flanders, former associate justice of the Rhode Island Supreme Court (running for U.S. Senate)
- Robert Nardolillo, state representative (running for U.S. Senate)
- Joe Trillo, former state representative (running as an independent)
- John Hazen White, businessman

=== Endorsements ===
Allan Fung

Federal officials

- Sean Spicer, former White House press secretary

State officials

- Lincoln Almond, former governor
- Michael Chippendale, state representative
- Frank Maher, former state senator
- Brian Newberry, state representative
- Thomas Paolino, state senator
- Mike Pinga, former state senator

Local officials

- Trent Colford, Cranston city councilman
- Michael Farina, president of the Cranston City Council
- Michael Favicchio, vice president of the Cranston City Council
- Liana Ferreira-Fenton, Middletown school committeewoman
- Rolland Grant, former mayor of East Providence
- Scott Hirst, town moderator of Hopkinton
- Kenneth Hopkins, Cranston city councilman
- Michael Isaacs, former president of the East Greenwich Town Council
- Frank Landolfi, president of the Hopkinton Town Council
- Kevin McGovern, president of the Exeter Town Council
- Matthew Mannix, president pro tem of the Narragansett Town Council
- Christopher Paplauskas, Cranston city councilman
- Glen Shibley, president of the Coventry Town Council

Party leadership

- Mark Smiley, former chair of the Rhode Island Republican Party
- Mark Zaccaria, former chair of the Rhode Island Republican Party

Organizations

- Cranston Republican City Committee
- Cumberland Republican Town Committee
- International Brotherhood of Police Officers Local 301
- Lincoln Republican Town Committee
- Middletown Republican Town Committee
- North Kingstown Republican Town Committee
- South Kingstown Republican Town Committee
- Warwick Republican City Committee
- Woonsocket Republican City Committee

Newspapers

- Cranston Herald

=== Polling ===
Poll source	Date(s) administered	Sample size	Margin of error	Allan Fung	Patricia Morgan	Other	Undecided
National Research Inc. (R-Morgan)	July 23–24, 2018	400	–	44%	33%	–	18%
Public Opinion Strategies (R-Fung)	July 11–14, 2018	400	± 4.9%	62%	22%	4%	10%

Hypothetical polling

Poll source	Date(s) administered	Sample size	Margin of error	Allan Fung	Patricia Morgan	Joe Trillo	Undecided
TargetPoint (R-Fung)	November 4–6, 2017	433	± 4.0%	45%	24%	10%	20%

==== Results ====
Results by county Fung: Fung—40–50%; Fung—50–60%; Fung—60–70%; Morgan: Morgan—50–60%

Results by municipality Fung: Fung—40–50%; Fung—50–60%; Fung—60–70%; Fung—80–90%; Morgan: Morgan—40–50%; Morgan—50–60%; Morgan—60–70%

Republican primary results
Party	Candidate	Votes	%
Republican	Allan Fung	18,577	56.4
Republican	Patricia Morgan	13,208	40.1
Republican	Giovanni Feroce	1,147	3.5
Total votes		32,932	100.0

== Moderate primary ==
=== Candidates ===
==== Declared ====
- Bill Gilbert, chairman of the Moderate Party of Rhode Island and nominee for lieutenant governor in 2014

== Independents ==
=== Declared ===
- Luis Daniel Muñoz, physician and community organizer
- Joe Trillo, former Republican state representative

=== Failed to qualify ===
- Rebecca McLaughlin

=== Declined ===
- Matt Brown, former Secretary of State of Rhode Island (running as a Democrat)

== Minor third parties ==
=== Declared ===
- Anne Armstrong (Compassion Party), cannabis activist

== General election ==
=== Debates ===
- Complete video of debate, September 27, 2018
- Complete video of debate, October 15, 2018

=== Predictions ===
Source	Ranking	As of
The Cook Political Report	Lean D	October 26, 2018
The Washington Post	Lean D	November 5, 2018
FiveThirtyEight	Safe D	November 5, 2018
Rothenberg Political Report	Lean D	November 1, 2018
Sabato's Crystal Ball	Likely D	November 5, 2018
RealClearPolitics	Likely D	November 4, 2018
Daily Kos	Lean D	November 5, 2018
Fox News (Note: The Fox News Midterm Power Rankings uniquely does not contain a category for Safe/Solid races)	Likely D	November 5, 2018
Politico	Lean D	November 5, 2018
Governing	Lean D	November 5, 2018

=== Polling ===
Poll source	Date(s) administered	Sample size	Margin of error	Gina Raimondo (D)	Allan Fung (R)	Joe Trillo (I)	Other	Undecided
Fleming & Associates	October 20–24, 2018	416	± 4.8%	45%	34%	9%	4%	8%
SocialSphere	October 5–9, 2018	502	–	40%	32%	17%	–	11%
University of New Hampshire	September 27 – October 6, 2018	503	± 4.4%	48%	34%	5%	3%	11%
Fleming & Associates	September 14–17, 2018	420	± 4.8%	43%	36%	7%	4%	9%
Fleming & Associates	July 28–31, 2018	407	± 4.8%	39%	37%	6%	3%	14%
SocialSphere	May 30 – June 4, 2018	501	–	33%	33%	16%	–	18%
Fleming & Associates	February 25–28, 2018	419	± 4.8%	38%	36%	6%	–	17%
TargetPoint (R-Fung)	November 4–6, 2017	600	± 4.0%	41%	46%	–	–	–

Hypothetical polling

with Gina Raimondo and Patricia Morgan

Poll source	Date(s) administered	Sample size	Margin of error	Gina Raimondo (D)	Patricia Morgan (R)	Joe Trillo (I)	Other	Undecided
Fleming & Associates	July 28–31, 2018	407	± 4.8%	42%	24%	8%	5%	22%
SocialSphere	May 30 – June 4, 2018	501	–	39%	20%	19%	–	22%
Fleming & Associates	February 25–28, 2018	419	± 4.8%	43%	25%	9%	–	20%

with Gina Raimondo and Giovanni Feroce

Poll source	Date(s) administered	Sample size	Margin of error	Gina Raimondo (D)	Giovanni Feroce (R)	Joe Trillo (I)	Other	Undecided
Fleming & Associates	July 28–31, 2018	407	± 4.8%	44%	9%	12%	6%	30%

with Matt Brown and Allan Fung

Poll source	Date(s) administered	Sample size	Margin of error	Matt Brown (D)	Allan Fung (R)	Joe Trillo (I)	Other	Undecided
Fleming & Associates	July 28–31, 2018	407	± 4.8%	21%	36%	7%	6%	30%
SocialSphere	May 30 – June 4, 2018	501	–	25%	35%	14%	–	27%

with Matt Brown and Patricia Morgan

Poll source	Date(s) administered	Sample size	Margin of error	Matt Brown (D)	Patricia Morgan (R)	Joe Trillo (I)	Other	Undecided
Fleming & Associates	July 28–31, 2018	407	± 4.8%	25%	21%	9%	8%	36%
SocialSphere	May 30 – June 4, 2018	501	–	30%	20%	18%	–	33%

with Matt Brown and Giovanni Feroce

Poll source	Date(s) administered	Sample size	Margin of error	Matt Brown (D)	Giovanni Feroce (R)	Joe Trillo (I)	Other	Undecided
Fleming & Associates	July 28–31, 2018	407	± 4.8%	27%	8%	11%	10%	43%

=== Results ===
Support for Joe Trillo by county Map legend: ≥5%; 4–5%; <4%

Rhode Island gubernatorial election, 2018
Party	Candidate	Votes	%	±%
Democratic	Gina Raimondo (incumbent)	198,122	52.64%	+11.94%
Republican	Allan Fung	139,932	37.18%	+0.94%
Independent	Joe Trillo	16,532	4.39%	N/A
Moderate	Bill Gilbert	10,155	2.70%	−18.68%
Independent	Luis Daniel Muñoz	6,223	1.65%	N/A
Compassion	Anne Armstrong	4,191	1.11%	N/A
Write-in		1,246	0.33%	+0.10%
Total votes		376,401	100%	N/A
Democratic hold				

==== By county ====
	Gina Raimondo Democratic		Allan Fung Republican		Others	
County	Votes	%	Votes	%	Votes	%
Bristol	12,316	58.1%	6,772	32.0%	2,091	9.9%
Kent	29,673	44.0%	29,921	44.8%	7,835	11.2%
Newport	20,014	59.6%	10,346	30.8%	3,211	9.6%
Providence	106,688	53.9%	72,247	36.5%	19,189	9.6%
Washington	29,431	52.5%	20,646	36.8%	6,021	10.7%

==== By congressional district ====
Raimondo won both congressional districts.

District	Raimondo	Fung	Representative
1st	59%	31%	David Cicilline
2nd	47%	43%	James Langevin

== See also ==
- Rhode Island elections, 2018
