= Trista (name) =

Trista is a given name. Notable people with the name include:

- Trista Sutter, American television personality
- Trista Seara, American professional soccer player
- Trista Mateer, American poet and visual artist
- Trista Piccola, former director of the Rhode Island Department of Children, Youth & Families
- Trista Elizabeth Eng, American murder victim
- Trista Vick-Majors, American biological science professor
