= Ken Block (politician) =

American businessman, engineer, and political reformer

Personal details
- Born: October 11, 1965 (age 61) Milford, Connecticut, U.S.
- Party: Moderate (2007–2013); Republican (2013–2020); Independent (2020–present)
- Education: Dartmouth College (BS)
- Website: Campaign website

Kenneth J. Block (born October 11, 1965) is an American businessman, software engineer, and political reformer. He is the founder of the Moderate Party of Rhode Island, the state's third-largest political party, and ran as the Moderate candidate for Governor of Rhode Island in the 2010 election. He ran for the Republican nomination in the 2014 gubernatorial election, losing to Cranston mayor Allan Fung, and was an independent candidate for governor in the 2026 election. He also served as president of RI Taxpayers, a taxpayer advocacy and watchdog group, until his resignation in May 2013 to mount a campaign for governor.

While leader of the Moderate Party, Block was an advocate for economic, educational, and political reforms in Rhode Island. His court battle to gain official state recognition for the Moderates in 2009 amended several laws he claimed were unconstitutional, and made it easier for third parties to gain signatures and access election ballots. In a highly contested four-way election, Block received 6.5% of the vote in the race.

Block emerged as one of the most outspoken critics of the Rhode Island General Assembly in the aftermath of the 2010 elections. He publicly opposed the controversial $75 million loan and subsequent taxpayer bailout of 38 Studios, the taxpayer-funded redevelopment of the Superman Building, and introduction of the Sakonnet River Bridge toll. Block has also called for the elimination of the "master lever" from election ballots which he argues creates voter disenfranchisement and unfairly benefits larger political parties. He eventually created MasterLever.org to explain his position and enable the public to contact state officials via e-mail.

As a small business owner, Block has run several software companies which have worked with state governments to identify fraud and government waste in social service and welfare programs. In 1995, Block was able to save the state of Texas over $1 billion by developing a new statewide debit card system. Shortly after the 2010 election, Block offered his company's help free of charge to find waste and fraud in Rhode Island's entitlement programs. He was subsequently involved in the state's Medicare waste and fraud report as well as assisting the Providence Police Department's fraud unit to better access state records in late 2012. Police investigators have claimed that the new computer software will help detect millions of dollars in fraud.

== Early life ==
Kenneth J. Block was born and raised in Milford, Connecticut. The oldest of three children, Block's family lived in the same house as his grandparents. He graduated from Milford High School in 1983 and then attended Dartmouth College where he earned a bachelor's degree in computer science four years later. Block began his career writing software for Wall Street trading desks during the late 1980s. He was employed by the Bank of New England and worked at small software consultancy firms Dalcomp Corporation and LOBB Systems. In 1991, Block moved to Rhode Island to work for the Providence-based GTECH Corporation. Although initially a one-year consultancy, he stayed with the company for another six years. From 1995 to 1999, Block was president of Kinetic Consulting, Inc., a software consultation firm that worked with state agencies to identify government waste and abuse as well as improving the overall efficiency of their spending programs, until the company was closed during the dot-com bust period.

In 2001, Block founded Simpatico Software Systems, a data mining service used by government agencies and private businesses to track waste and fraud. Additionally, it supplies software services to the SNAP program. Similar to his first company, Simpatico Systems also provided engineering and consulting services. Its clients have included the EVERTEC and GTECH Corporations, Northrop Grumman, and the state government of Texas. In Texas, Block's company developed a statewide debit card system for food stamp and welfare recipients that saved the state more than $1 billion. Two years later he created a second company, Cross Alert Systems, which manufactures "intelligent" traffic systems for recreational trail and public road intersections.

== Political career ==
In 2007, Block decided to enter the Rhode Island political scene. In later interviews, Block said that he entered politics out of frustration with the state government's inability to solve Rhode Island's declining economy and education system. He was particularly concerned that his children were not getting a quality education in public schools and, like many young Rhode Islanders, would eventually have to leave the state due to high unemployment. He also noted the difficulty for small business owners to operate in the state and that the high tax rate forced many companies to relocate to Massachusetts and elsewhere. As a longtime business owner himself, Block believed many of these problems could easily be fixed though basic fiscal responsibility and "common sense" leadership.

Disillusioned with both the Democratic and Republican parties, who he felt were more concerned battling over social issues, Block believed that starting a centrist-based third-party would be the best option. His political affiliation is unknown before 2007, however, Block has stated his admiration for former RI Governor Bruce Sundlun. A Brown University political poll reported that 74% of Rhode Islanders were dissatisfied with the state's political leadership and "would be supportive of a new moderate political party". A poll run by Block produced similar numbers. He reasoned that if his party could attract enough moderate voters, they would be able to put pressure on then Republican Governor Donald L. Carcieri and the Democrat-controlled General Assembly to address vital issues he felt were being neglected by the state.

The Moderate Party of Rhode Island was founded by Block a year later. An official website was launched in early-2008 and several candidates were endorsed in the general election - Jean Ann Guliano (D), John Pagliarini (R), Matt McHugh (I), and Christopher Little (I). On October 23, 2008, Block co-hosted Operation Clean Government's State of the State with former RI attorney general Arlene Violet interviewing all four candidates. Gaining official recognition by the state was "a fight and a half" according to Block. In February 2009, Block and American Civil Liberties Union filed a lawsuit against the state to gain official party status. U.S. District Judge William Smith, striking down several ballot access laws as unconstitutional, ruled in the Moderate Party's favor three months later. The Moderate Party were able to collect over 34,000 signatures, the 12th highest number of signatures in the country, to qualify as a political party and were placed on the 2010 ballot. Afterwards, Block said that Rhode Island was the most difficult state to start a political party. The Moderate Party would find support from a number of prominent figures including former Hasbro CEO Alan G. Hassenfeld, Arlene Violet, and former U.S. Attorney Robert Clark Corrente, the latter briefly serving as party chairman.

=== 2010 election ===
Block was the Moderate Party's candidate for Governor during the 2010 election. He had not intended to run for office, however, Block reluctantly stepped in after failing to find a suitable candidate in time. Block had developed an interest in civics and government while at Dartmouth College in the 1980s though he had no political experience prior to the campaign. He was successful in gaining the necessary signatures 1,000 registered voters to get on the ballot. His door-to-door campaigning in South Kingstown was included in a feature story for Rhode Island Monthly. Block was one of the candidates profiled on Fox Providence's The Rhode Show for its "Coffee with the Candidates" segment.

Block finished fourth in the statewide general election with 22,146 votes, garnering 6.5% of the vote. He followed Democrat Frank Caprio with 78,896 votes (23%), Republican John Robitaille with 114,911 votes (33.6%), and the winner, Independent Lincoln Chafee with 123,571 votes (36.1%). Though an impressive performance for a first-time candidate, Block was blamed for his part in the four-way race that allowed Chafee to win the election. The Republican Party of Rhode Island was particularly critical of Block for splitting the conservative vote, as Robitaille lost to the more liberal Chafee by less than 4% of the vote.

=== Post-election ===
Block continued his political activism as leader of the Moderate Party, stressing the need for economic, educational, and governmental reforms. He made several guest appearances on Rhode Island PBS's public affairs television program A Lively Experiment and Operation Clean Government's State of the State. He began a movement to abolish the "master lever", and worked with the state to uncover fraud and waste in the state's welfare programs, going so far as to offer his company's services to Governor Chafee at no charge. In January 2013, Block began teaching a technology and business class as an adjunct professor at the University of Rhode Island.

An outspoken critic of the Rhode Island General Assembly, he challenged a number of controversial decisions made by the legislative body. While running for Governor, Block criticized the state's $75 million loan to 38 Studios, in exchange for the video game company moving its headquarters from Maynard, Massachusetts to Providence, Rhode Island, suggesting that the money would be better spent investing in local businesses. He was also strongly opposed to taxpayer-funded redevelopment of the Superman Building and the introduction of the Sakonnet River Bridge toll. Block called this most recent legislation by the assembly an "awful decision" and condemned the Rhode Island Democratic Party as "[proving] itself completely incapable of governing the state."

In November 2020, Block was hired by the presidential campaign of Donald Trump to find evidence of election fraud. Block wrote a book about his experiences titled Disproven, which was published March 12, 2024.

=== Combating fraud and government waste ===
Shortly after the 2010 election, Democratic State Representative Lisa Baldelli-Hunt urged Governor Lincoln Chafee to contact Block about working with state agencies to uncover fraud in Rhode Island's Medicaid programs. In April 2011, Block volunteered his company's services free of charge to help the state identify waste and fraud in Health and Human Services spending. He was not able to testify in person before the House and Senate Finance Committee that month; a written statement was submitted into the record instead. Two months later, Block talked with both the Department of Human Services and the Department of Labor and Training about using his company's services free of charge. After several months negotiating with the Chafee administration, Block announced on WPRO's The John DePetro Show that his company was close to reaching an agreement to start working with state agencies to investigate waste and abuse in Rhode Island's welfare system.

Block's company, Simpatico Software Systems, began working with the Providence Police Department's fraud unit in late 2012. Simpatico Systems developed a computer program so that fraud investigators can more easily access state records. The unit's two investigators, Jack Costa and Daniel Murphy, had previously been dependent on more than a dozen other agencies throughout the state and records were often unavailable in the current system. The Simpatico system specifically assisted the Providence Housing Authority in sharing data with the state government. Their efforts were featured on the November 6th edition of WPRI's Eyewitness News. It was claimed that the new computer software would help investigators detect millions of dollars in fraud. He was later involved in the Rhode Island Health and Human Services Waste and Fraud Report which submitted its preliminary findings in early 2013.

=== Ban the Master Lever initiative ===
Another reform pushed by Block was the elimination of straight-ticket or "master lever" voting, which allows voters to cast a ballot for all candidates of a single political party with one vote, arguing that it confuses and disenfranchises voters. The master lever was first introduced to Rhode Island in 1939 when voting machines required voters to physically pull multiple levers to cast a vote. These machines were eventually replaced with a modern electronic system in the late 1990s, yet the law remained in place. Block was among those who testified before the Rhode Island Senate in a judiciary hearing on the elimination of the master lever in March 2012.

A later study conducted by the Moderate Party, which examined ballots from the 2010 election in Burrillville, Rhode Island, indicated that voters did not understand how to use the master lever. Voters that chose to vote for all Democratic candidates would often cancel out their votes when continuing to cast individual votes further down in the ballot. Block cited the Moderate Party's campaign in the November 2012 election as an example with, he said, over 9,000 Rhode Island voters using the Moderate Party master lever mechanism despite not having a Moderate candidate on the ballot. Politifact judged this claim as 'mostly true" saying that there were slightly under 9,000 such votes.

Another issue caused by the master lever, critics argue, is "under voting" at the local level, where many offices are officially non-partisan, with candidates being skipped on the ballot because they do not belong to a political party. The master lever also created an unfair advantage for majority political parties at the expense of minority and third parties. Both Allan Fung and Scott Avedisian, Republican mayors of Cranston and Warwick respectively, agreed with this view; a ballot recount by Fung in his 2006 election revealed serious irregularities in votes cast by the master lever. In U.S. presidential elections, many voters unknowingly elect candidates simply by voting for a presidential nominee. An estimated 46,000 voters used the master lever during the 2010 gubernatorial elections, a number which doubled during the 2012 U.S. presidential election, giving local Democrats a huge advantage over non-Democratic candidates.

In January 2013, Block launched MasterLever.org to inform the public about the problems using the obsolete voting system in local and state elections. The website allowed supporters to send an automated letter to state officials including House Speaker Gordon Fox, Senate President M. Teresa Paiva-Weed, and Governor Lincoln Chafee. Within a week of its launch, 500 people had sent letters via the website in support the banning the master lever. That number rose to 2,600 within four months. Although the majority of the General Assembly remained silent on the issue, Block's initiative eventually gained support from key political figures including Democratic Secretary of State Ralph Mollis and Governor Chafee. Block polled legislators at the State House for their stance on the master lever which he then made available on the website. A ban on the master lever was also supported by RI-based government watchdog groups Common Cause, Operation Clean Government, and the Rhode Island Statewide Coalition.

Block made a second appearance on the April 5th edition of A Lively Experiment where he talked about his views on the master lever, payday loans, and state tax credits. Block's report on waste and fraud in Rhode Island's state social service programs was also a topic of discussion on the show.

=== Involvement with RI Taxpayers ===
On February 4, 2013, Block succeeded Harriet Lloyd as president of the taxpayer advocacy group RI Taxpayers (formerly known as the Rhode Island Statewide Coalition). The decision was discussed a week later on A Lively Experiment; one of the guest panelists, columnist Donna Perry, was the executive director of RI Taxpayers.

As president of the organization, Block was an active public speaker and made numerous appearances before state committee hearings. On March 13, 2013, he testified before RI House Judiciary Committee on behalf of both the Moderate Party and RI Taxpayers urging the members to pass legislation for eliminating "master lever" voting in the state. At the RI Taxpayers' annual meeting on May 11, Block issued a formal challenge to the General Assembly to "stop stalling" on economic-related legislation for businesses and taxpayers before adjourning next month. At another meeting, Block called for more citizen involvement in local government and warned that voter apathy, especially among people under 40, would continue to result in poor legislation and a lack of accountability by political leadership. He also spoke about the importance of economic reforms and the need to improve the state's business climate. After a four-month term, Block resigned his position with RI Taxpayers to run in the 2014 elections.

=== 2014 election ===
On May 21, 2013, Block announced he would once again run for office as Governor of Rhode Island in the 2014 election. He based his campaign on a plan to save Rhode Island taxpayers $1 billion by eliminating wasteful spending. Weeks after Block's campaign launch, political operative Jeff Britt joined the Moderate Party as Block's campaign manager; Britt was previously a political ally of Democratic House Speaker Gordon Fox and former Republican governor Don Carcieri. His campaign was endorsed by blogger and third-party activist Dennis Mikolay praising him as a government watchdog. One of his last public appearances as a Moderate candidate took place at Roger Williams University on September 30, 2013.

==== Switch to the Republican Party ====
On October 28, 2013, Block officially announced at a Barrington town hall meeting that he would be joining the Republican Party with the intention of running as its candidate for the 2014 gubernatorial election. The news was not totally unexpected as Block, who had been largely funding the Moderate Party with his own finances, including his 2010 campaign, commissioned a poll on his chances running as a Moderate or Republican candidate over the summer. A Taubman Center for Public Policy and American Institutions poll indicated only 9% of participants would vote for Block as a Moderate candidate. Three months earlier, Block suggested that he would be open to running as a Republican during a WPRO interview with Buddy Cianci. He had also been courted by Republican Joe Trillo to join the party partially to prevent another four-way race which allowed then independent candidate Lincoln Chafee to win the 2010 election.

John DePetro called Block's decision a "smart political move" and speculated on the upcoming GOP primary between Block and Republican party favorite Cranston mayor Allan Fung. The news was also discussed on A Lively Experiment with guest panelists Dave Layman, WPRO/WPRI legal analyst Louis Pulner, Brown University political science professor Wendy Schiller, and Arlene Violet.

Block declared his intention to run as the party's nominee in a letter to 20,000 Republican voters and based his campaign on an ambitious plan to save the state $1 billion in government waste over a four-year period. He further explained that this amount could easily be achieved by focusing on "off budget" spending such as public sector retiree healthcare, temporary disability, and unemployment insurance. Block offered the state's Temporary Disability Insurance (TDI) program as an example. Cutting the annual costs in half for the TDI program, which is twice as much to run as New Jersey, would save $80 million alone. Block outlined his plan on his official website in addition to other forums as well. In November 2013, he was invited to write a column for The Providence Journal to make his case for saving the state $1 billion by eliminating government waste. Block was also interviewed by Tim White and Ted Nesi on the November 15 edition of WPRI's Eyewitness News and further explained his plan to save the state $1 billion.

That same month, PolitiFact.com rated a claim by Block that Rhode Island has the most expensive unemployment system in the country as "false". According to the "2014 State Business Tax Climate Index", published by the Tax Foundation, Rhode Island ranked 46 out of the 50 states. In the report, Rhode Island's unemployment insurance system was rated the worst in the country, however, that alone did not indicate it was the most expensive. Block's policy director, Matthew Schweich, defended the statement pointing out that Rhode Island was ranked near the bottom in almost every category and argued that the cumulative effect supports their claim. Block responded to the website in a letter to the editor of The Providence Journal acknowledging the error "but choosing the wrong words and intentionally misleading voters are different types of mistakes".

In December 2013, longtime Rhode Island GOP fundraiser Tony Bucci resigned his slot on Fung's campaign committee to join Ken Block's gubernatorial campaign as a senior adviser and finance chairman.

Block lost the primary to Fung, 55% to 45%.

=== 2026 election ===
Block, who had left the Republican Party to become an independent in 2020, announced a third bid for Governor of Rhode Island on April 2, 2026.

== Personal life ==
Block lives in Barrington, Rhode Island with his wife Jennifer, a middle school science teacher, and their two children, Anna and Sam.

== Electoral history ==
=== 2010 ===
Rhode Island Gubernatorial Election 2010
| Party | Candidate | Votes | % |
|---|---|---|---|
| Independent | Lincoln Chafee | 123,571 | 36.1 |
| Republican | John Robitaille | 114,911 | 33.6 |
| Democratic | Frank Caprio | 78,896 | 23.0 |
| Moderate | Ken Block | 22,146 | 6.5 |
| Independent | Joseph Lusi | 1,091 | 0.3 |
| Independent | Todd Giroux | 882 | 0.3 |
| Independent | Ronald Algieri | 793 | 0.2 |

=== 2014 ===
Republican primary results
| Party | Candidate | Votes | % |
|---|---|---|---|
| Republican | Allan Fung | 17,530 | 54.9 |
| Republican | Ken Block | 14,399 | 45.1 |
| Total votes | | 31,929 | 100 |

Party political offices
| First | Moderate nominee for Governor of Rhode Island; 2010 | Succeeded by Robert J. Healey |
