= Scott Guthrie (politician) =

American politician (born 1957)

Member of the Rhode Island House of Representatives from the 28th district
- In office January 2009 – January 2015
- Preceded by: Victor Moffitt
- Succeeded by: Robert Nardolillo

Member of the Rhode Island House of Representatives from the 41st district
- In office April 2001 – January 2003
- Preceded by: Nancy Hetherington
- Succeeded by: Victor Moffitt

Personal details
- Born: September 24, 1957 (age 68) Warwick, Rhode Island
- Party: Democratic
- Profession: Firefighter

Scott J. Guthrie (born September 24, 1957 in Warwick, Rhode Island) is an American politician and a Democratic former member of the Rhode Island House of Representatives representing District 28 from 2009 to 2015. Guthrie previously served non-consecutively from April 2001 until January 2003.

== Education ==
Guthrie graduated from Coventry High School.

== Elections ==
- 2002 Guthrie was challenged in the September 10, 2002 Democratic Primary, winning with 758 votes (61.2%) but lost the November 5, 2002 General election to Republican nominee Victor Moffitt.
- 2004 Guthrie and Representative Moffitt were both unopposed for their September 14, 2004 primaries, setting up a rematch; Guthrie lost the November 2, 2004 General election to Representative Moffitt.
- 2008 When Representative Moffitt ran for Governor of Rhode Island and left the seat open, Guthrie ran in the September 9, 2008 Democratic Primary, winning by 75 votes with 472 votes (54.3%) and won the November 4, 2008 General election with 4,044 votes (55.0%) against Republican nominee Steven Hart.
- 2010 Guthrie and returning 2010 Republican opponent Hart were both unopposed for their September 23, 2010 primaries, setting up a rematch; Guthrie won the November 2, 2010 General election with 3,008 votes (51.8%) against Hart.
- 2012 Guthrie was unopposed for the September 11, 2012 Democratic Primary, winning with 504 votes and won the November 6, 2012 General election with 3,930 votes (59.7%) against Republican nominee Carl Mattson.
- 2014 Guthrie was unopposed for the September 9, 2014 Democratic Primary, winning with 504 votes and lost the November 4, 2014 General election with 1,845 votes (35.3%) against Republican nominee Robert A. Nardolillo.
