= Womazetta Jones =

Womazetta Robinson

Secretary of the Executive Office of Health and Human Services
- In office July 2019 – May 2022
- Governor: Gina Raimondo
- Preceded by: Lisa Vura-Weis (acting)

Personal details
- Born: April 24, 1969 (age 55); Chicago, Illinois
- Children: 3
- Education: Western Illinois University (BS); Chicago State University (MA)

Womazetta Robinson (born April 24, 1969) is an American social services executive currently serving as the Secretary of the Executive Office of Health and Human Services (EOHHS) of the State of Rhode Island. Robinson was appointed by Governor Gina N. Raimondo and confirmed by the Rhode Island Senate.

== Early life and education ==
Robinson was born and raised in Chicago, Illinois. In 1991, she graduated from Western Illinois University with a bachelor's degree in law enforcement administration and political science followed by a master's degree in psychology, counseling, and guidance earned from Chicago State University.

== Career ==
Robinson began her career in 1991 as a social worker at the Illinois Department of Children and Family Services. Throughout her career with DCFS, she served as a front line social worker, child welfare specialist, child protection investigator, supervisor for investigation teams, regional manager for investigation teams and training manager. Robinson ultimately remained with the agency for over 15 years and became Deputy Chief for Child Protection and the Illinois Child Protection Statewide Training Manager.

Robinson also worked as an overseer of child protection for the Roman Catholic Archdiocese of Chicago. As director of the Safe Environment Office from 2007 to 2009, she was responsible for reforming the Archdiocese and protecting children after a priest abuse scandal. Robinson was responsible for an archdiocese-wide launch of new policies and practices to ensure the safety of children. This included enhanced background screening for all archdiocesan employees, clergy, educators, and ministers and implementing programs and initiatives that worked to keep children safe.

She also spent time working for the Oprah Winfrey Leadership Foundation.

Robinson joined the Social Services Department of Ramsey County, Minnesota, the state's second-largest county, as Division Director for Children and Family Services in June 2013 and was promoted to director of social services for Ramsey County in 2016. In her role as director, Robinson was responsible for overseeing protection for children and adults and providing support and treatment for disabilities, mental health, and substance abuse disorders along with services such as child protection, foster care, child care licensing, and adoptions.

== Nomination to Rhode Island EOHHS Secretary ==
After a national search, Robinson was introduced in May 2019 as Rhode Island Governor Gina Raimondo's selection for the cabinet-level position of Secretary of the Executive Office of Health and Human Services. She started in her role on July 22, 2019 after she was confirmed by the Senate. Robinson replaced Lisa Vura-Weis who served as acting Secretary following the departure of former EOHHS Secretary Eric Beane.

Secretary Robinson was responsible for administering state agencies that provide services worth billions of dollars to over 300,000 residents, one third of the population of the state. Her role oversaw Rhode Island Medicaid, the Rhode Island Department of Health; the Rhode Island Department of Children, Youth and Families; the Rhode Island Department of Behavioral Healthcare, Developmental Disabilities and Hospitals; and the Rhode Island Department of Human Services, including the Office of Veterans Services and Office of Healthy Aging.

Secretary Robinson left her position as Rhode Island EOHHS Secretary on May 1, 2022.
