= 2014 Rhode Island gubernatorial election =

- November 4, 2014
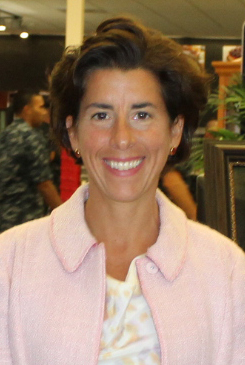

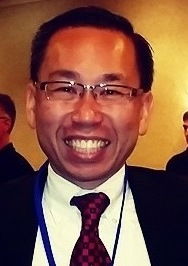

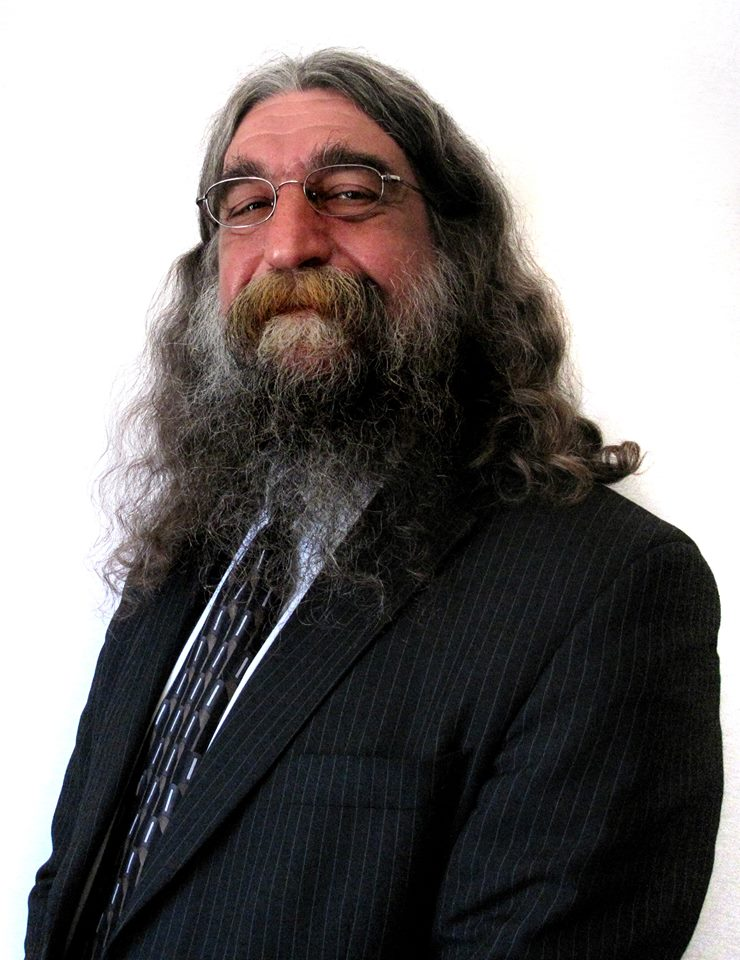
Nominee	Gina Raimondo	Allan Fung	Robert J. Healey
Party	Democratic	Republican	Moderate
Popular vote	131,899	117,428	69,278
Percentage	40.70%	36.24%	21.38%
- Raimondo: 30–40% 40–50% 50–60% 60–70% 70–80% 80–90% Fung: 30–40% 40–50% 50–60% 60–70% Healey: 30–40% 40–50% Tie: No votes
Governor before election
Lincoln Chafee
Democratic
Elected Governor
Gina Raimondo
Democratic

The 2014 Rhode Island gubernatorial election took place on November 4, 2014, to elect the governor of Rhode Island, concurrently with the election of Rhode Island's Class II U.S. Senate seat, as well as other elections to the United States Senate in other states and elections to the United States House of Representatives and various state and local elections.

Incumbent Democratic governor Lincoln Chafee was eligible to run for re-election to a second term but decided to retire. He had been elected as an independent candidate and became a Democrat in 2013. In primary elections held on September 9, 2014, the Democrats nominated Rhode Island Treasurer Gina Raimondo and the Republicans nominated Cranston Mayor Allan Fung. Also on the ballot were Robert J. Healey of the Moderate Party and two Independent candidates.

Raimondo won the election, becoming the first Democrat to be elected governor since Bruce Sundlun in 1992, as Chafee had been elected as an independent in 2010. Raimondo became the first female governor in Rhode Island history. Democrats won Newport County for the first time in a gubernatorial election since 1998, and Bristol and Washington counties since 1992.

== Background ==
In the 2010 gubernatorial election, Republican incumbent Donald Carcieri was term-limited and unable to seek a third term in office. The Republicans nominated businessman John Robitaille and the Democrats nominated State Treasurer Frank T. Caprio. Also contesting the election were Moderate Party nominee Ken Block and Lincoln Chafee, who served as a Republican U.S. senator from 1999 to 2007. After losing a bid for re-election in 2006, Chafee left the Republican Party and became an independent, running for governor as such. After a close three-way race between Chafee, Robitaille and Caprio, Chafee won the election with a plurality, taking 36% to Robitaille's 34%, Caprio's 23% and Block's 6%.

After constant speculation during his term, Chafee officially joined the Democratic Party on May 30, 2013. He had previously indicated that he might run for re-election as an independent or a Democrat. In the face of low approval ratings, polling showing him trailing in both the Democratic primary and the general election, and with weak fundraising, Chafee announced on September 4, 2013, that he would not run for re-election. Chafee thus became just the fourth governor in the history of Rhode Island to decline to seek a second term, after Byron Diman in 1847, Royal C. Taft in 1889 and William S. Flynn in 1924.

== Democratic primary ==
Gina Raimondo, Treasurer of Rhode Island, and Angel Taveras, mayor of Providence, announced their campaigns in late 2013 and the race initially seemed to be between the more fiscally moderate Raimondo and the more progressive Taveras. However, the entry of Clay Pell, an Obama administration official and grandson of Claiborne Pell, into the race complicated things. Unions who had criticized Raimondo for cutting pension benefits and investing in hedge funds during her tenure as Treasurer and for fundraising from Wall Street and national lobbyists were split on whether to back Taveras or Pell. A coalition of unions including firefighters, police, supermarket clerks, and city employees backed Taveras, whereas the powerful teachers' unions backed Pell, unimpressed with Taveras' support for charter schools. Raimondo drew support from non-union and private sector workers and some private sector unions including iron workers. Pell spent over $3.4 million of his own money and ran a positive campaign, but he was much criticized for his inexperience and lack of ties to Rhode Island. Taveras emphasised his background as the son of poor Dominican immigrants to appeal to Latino and working-class voters. All three candidates agreed not to seek the endorsement of the state Democratic Party. Ultimately, Taveras and Pell took an almost equal share of the vote as progressive Democrats split their vote between the two, allowing Raimondo to win with a plurality. Raimondo won 36 of the state's 39 municipalities. Taveras won Central Falls and Pell won Burrillville and Foster.

=== Candidates ===
==== Declared ====
- Todd Giroux, contractor and independent candidate for governor in 2010
- Clay Pell, former Deputy Assistant Secretary for International and Foreign Language Education in the United States Department of Education and grandson of Rhode Island's longest serving senator Claiborne Pell
- Gina Raimondo, Treasurer of Rhode Island
- Angel Taveras, Mayor of Providence

==== Withdrew ====
- Ernie Almonte, former auditor general of Rhode Island (running for Treasurer of Rhode Island)
- Lincoln Chafee, incumbent governor

==== Declined ====
- Patrick C. Lynch, former attorney general of Rhode Island
- Elizabeth H. Roberts, Lieutenant Governor of Rhode Island
- Robert Weygand, former U.S. representative

=== Polling ===
Poll source	Date(s) administered	Sample size	Margin of error	Todd Giroux	Clay Pell	Gina Raimondo	Angel Taveras	Other/ Undecided
Fleming & Associates	August 11–14, 2014	503	± 4.38%	1.4%	25.6%	32.2%	26.8%	12.9%
Fleming & Associates	May 27–30, 2014	506	± 4.38%	1.6%	11.5%	29.2%	33.4%	24.3%
Brown University	April 3–5, 2014	395	± 4.9%	—	9.6%	29.4%	25.8%	35.2%
Fleming & Associates	February 3–6, 2014	503	± 4.38%	1.2%	14.7%	27%	31.2%	25.9%
Brown University	October 2–5, 2013	433	± 4.5%	—	—	42%	33.6%	24.4%
Garin-Hart-Yang^	September 10–12, 2013	400	± 5%	—	—	30%	49%	21%

- ^ Internal poll for the Angel Taveras Campaign
Hypothetical polling

Poll source	Date(s) administered	Sample size	Margin of error	Lincoln Chafee	Ernie Almonte	Gina Raimondo	Angel Taveras	Other/ Undecided
Public Policy Polling	January 28–30, 2013	320	± 5.5%	22%	11%	35%	19%	12%
Public Policy Polling	January 28–30, 2013	320	± 5.5%	—	9%	44%	35%	13%

=== Results ===
Results by municipality: Raimondo: Raimondo—30–40%; Raimondo—40–50%; Raimondo—50–60%; Raimondo—60–70%; Pell: Pell—30–40%; Pell—40–50%; Taveras: Taveras—50–60%

Democratic primary results
Party	Candidate	Votes	%
Democratic	Gina Raimondo	53,990	42.15
Democratic	Angel Taveras	37,326	29.14
Democratic	Clay Pell	34,515	26.94
Democratic	Todd Giroux	2,264	1.77
Total votes		128,095	100.00

== Republican primary ==
=== Candidates ===
==== Declared ====
- Ken Block, Moderate Party nominee for governor in 2010
- Allan Fung, Mayor of Cranston

==== Declined ====
- Scott Avedisian, Mayor of Warwick
- Brendan Doherty, former Superintendent of the Rhode Island State Police and nominee for Rhode Island's 1st congressional district in 2012
- Barry Hinckley, businessman and nominee for the U.S. Senate in 2012
- John Robitaille, former aide to Governor Donald Carcieri and nominee for governor in 2010

=== Polling ===
Poll source	Date(s) administered	Sample size	Margin of error	Ken Block	Allan Fung	Other/ Undecided
Fabrizio, Lee & Ass.*	April 2014	300	± ?	46%	37%	17%
Brown University	April 3–5, 2014	86	± 10.6%	36%	31.4%	38.5%
Fabrizio, Lee & Ass.*	October 2013	?	± ?	25%	53%	22%

- * Internal poll for the Ken Block campaign

=== Results ===
Results by county Fung—50–60% Block—50–60%

Results by municipality Fung: Fung—50–60%; Fung—60–70%; Fung—70–80%; Block: Block—50–60%; Block—60–70%

Republican primary results
Party	Candidate	Votes	%
Republican	Allan Fung	17,530	54.9
Republican	Ken Block	14,399	45.1
Total votes		31,929	100.0

== Other parties ==
=== Candidates ===
==== Declared ====
- Robert J. Healey (Moderate), perennial candidate
- Kate Fletcher (Independent)
- Leon Kayarian (Independent)

==== Withdrew ====
- Ken Block (Moderate), nominee for governor in 2010 (switched to Republican primary)
- James Spooner (Moderate)

==== Removed from ballot ====
- Thomas Davis (Independent)
- Christopher Reynolds (Independent)
- Anna Winograd Vrankar (Compassion)

==== Declined ====
- Gina Raimondo (Independent), Democratic Treasurer of Rhode Island (won the Democratic primary)

== General election ==
=== Campaign ===
Union voter dissatisfaction with Raimondo carried over into the general election, with one poll finding they backed Republican Allan Fung over her, 42% to 30%. Moderate Party nominee Robert J. Healey won 22% of the vote, having spent $35.31 to receive 67,707 votes, or $0.0005 (five ten-thousandths of a dollar) for each vote he received. He later joked, "It's amazing what $35 can do. As I've been saying, if we only spent $75, $80, we might've won the race."

==== Debate ====
2014 Rhode Island gubernatorial election debate
No.	Date	Host	Moderator	Link	Democratic	Republican	Moderate
Key: P Participant A Absent N Not invited I Invited W Withdrawn							
Key: P Participant A Absent N Not invited I Invited W Withdrawn					Gina Raimondo	Allan Fung	Robert Healey
1	Oct. 21, 2014	The Providence Journal; WPRI-TV	Tim White	C-SPAN	P	P	P

=== Predictions ===
Source	Ranking	As of
The Cook Political Report	Tossup	November 3, 2014
Sabato's Crystal Ball	Lean D	November 3, 2014
Rothenberg Political Report	Tilt D	November 3, 2014
Real Clear Politics	Tossup	November 3, 2014

=== Polling ===
Poll source	Date(s) administered	Sample size	Margin of error	Gina Raimondo (D)	Allan Fung (R)	Robert J. Healey (M)	Other	Undecided
Brown University	October 25–26, 2014	500	± 4.4%	40%	39%	13%	1%	11%
CBS News/NYT/YouGov	October 16–23, 2014	866	± 6%	40%	35%	—	4%	21%
Brown University	October 14–17, 2014	1,129	± 2.9%	42%	31%	9%	1%	18%
Fleming & Associates	October 6–9, 2014	505	± 4%	42%	36%	8%	1%	14%
CBS News/NYT/YouGov	September 20–October 1, 2014	724	± 4%	41%	38%	—	2%	19%
Rasmussen Reports	September 23–25, 2014	750	± 4%	42%	37%	—	11%	11%
Public Opinion Strategies*	September 10–11, 2014	500	± 4.38%	42%	42%	—	—	16%
Brown University	October 2–5, 2013	638	± 3.9%	38%	36%	—	—	27%
Public Policy Polling	January 28–30, 2013	614	± 4%	46%	27%	—	12%	14%

- * Internal poll for the Allan Fung campaign
Hypothetical polling

With Raimondo

Poll source	Date(s) administered	Sample size	Margin of error	Gina Raimondo (D)	Brendan Doherty (R)	Ken Block (I)	Undecided
Public Policy Polling	January 28–30, 2013	614	± 4%	44%	32%	10%	14%

With Taveras

Poll source	Date(s) administered	Sample size	Margin of error	Angel Taveras (D)	Ken Block (R)	Other	Undecided
CBS News/NYT/YouGov	July 5–24, 2014	919	± 3.4%	49%	24%	15%	13%

Poll source	Date(s) administered	Sample size	Margin of error	Angel Taveras (D)	Brendan Doherty (R)	Ken Block (I)	Undecided
Public Policy Polling	January 28–30, 2013	614	± 4%	39%	35%	13%	13%

Poll source	Date(s) administered	Sample size	Margin of error	Angel Taveras (D)	Allan Fung (R)	Ken Block (I)	Other	Undecided
CBS News/NYT/YouGov	August 18–September 2, 2014	764	± 4%	33%	33%	—	20%	14%
Brown University	October 2–5, 2013	638	± 3.9%	42%	33%	—	—	26%
Public Policy Polling	January 28–30, 2013	614	± 4%	37%	31%	15%	—	17%

With Chafee

Poll source	Date(s) administered	Sample size	Margin of error	Lincoln Chafee (D)	Brendan Doherty (R)	Ken Block (I)	Undecided
Public Policy Polling	January 28–30, 2013	614	± 4%	35%	39%	13%	9%

Poll source	Date(s) administered	Sample size	Margin of error	Lincoln Chafee (D)	Allan Fung (R)	Ken Block (I)	Undecided
Public Policy Polling	January 28–30, 2013	614	± 4%	32%	36%	16%	15%

Four-way race

Poll source	Date(s) administered	Sample size	Margin of error	Lincoln Chafee (I)	Gina Raimondo (D)	Brendan Doherty (R)	Ken Block (I)	Undecided
Public Policy Polling	January 28–30, 2013	614	± 4%	22%	32%	28%	8%	9%

Poll source	Date(s) administered	Sample size	Margin of error	Lincoln Chafee (I)	Gina Raimondo (D)	Allan Fung (R)	Ken Block (I)	Undecided
Public Policy Polling	January 28–30, 2013	614	± 4%	21%	35%	23%	10%	12%

Poll source	Date(s) administered	Sample size	Margin of error	Lincoln Chafee (I)	Angel Taveras (D)	Brendan Doherty (R)	Ken Block (I)	Undecided
Public Policy Polling	January 28–30, 2013	614	± 4%	23%	26%	31%	10%	10%

Poll source	Date(s) administered	Sample size	Margin of error	Lincoln Chafee (I)	Angel Taveras (D)	Allan Fung (R)	Ken Block (I)	Undecided
Public Policy Polling	January 28–30, 2013	614	± 4%	20%	26%	26%	13%	14%

Poll source	Date(s) administered	Sample size	Margin of error	Gina Raimondo (D)	Angel Taveras (D)	Allan Fung (R)	Ken Block (I)	Undecided
Brown University	October 2–5, 2013	638	± 4.5%	27%	21%	19%	9%	24%

=== Results ===
County Flips: Democratic Flip / Republican Hold

Rhode Island gubernatorial election, 2014
Party	Candidate	Votes	%	±%
Democratic	Gina Raimondo	131,899	40.70%	+17.65%
Republican	Allan Fung	117,428	36.24%	+2.67%
Moderate	Robert J. Healey	69,278	21.38%	+14.91%
Independent	Kate Fletcher	3,483	1.07%	N/A
Independent	Leon Kayarian	1,228	0.38%	N/A
Write-in		739	0.23%	N/A
Turnout		324,055	100%	N/A
Democratic hold				

==== By county ====
	Gina Raimondo Democratic		Allan Fung Republican		Robert J. Healey Moderate		Others		Total
County	Votes	%	Votes	%	Votes	%	Votes	%	Total
Bristol	7,312	39.88%	4,806	26.21%	6,060	33.05%	158	0.86%	18,336
Kent	20,176	34.19%	23,009	38.99%	14,937	25.31%	893	1.51%	59,015
Newport	12,888	43.74%	10,122	34.35%	5,898	20.01%	560	1.90%	29,468
Providence	73,262	43.16%	61,519	36.24%	32,086	18.90%	2,883	1.70%	169,750
Washington	18,261	38.46%	17,972	37.85%	10,297	21.68%	956	2.01%	47,486

Counties that flipped from Republican to Democratic

- Newport (largest municipality: Newport)

Counties that flipped from Independent to Democratic

- Bristol (largest municipality: Bristol)
- Providence (largest municipality: Providence)
- Washington (largest municipality: South Kingstown)

==== By municipality ====
	Gina Raimondo Democratic		Allan Fung Republican		Robert J. Healey Moderate		Others		Total
Municipality	Votes	%	Votes	%	Votes	%	Votes	%	Total
Barrington	3,566	49.6%	2,022	28.1%	1,554	21.6%	50	0.7%	7,192
Bristol	2,628	35.7%	1,959	26.6%	2,709	36.8%	75	1.0%	7,368
Burrillville	1,334	28.6%	1,861	39.9%	1,371	29.4%	104	2.2%	4,670
Central Falls	1,359	66.4%	358	17.5%	280	13.7%	50	2.4%	2,047
Charlestown	1,177	38.0%	1,137	36.7%	728	23.5%	59	1.9%	3,101
Coventry	3,812	30.2%	4,979	39.4%	3,610	28.6%	233	1.8%	12,634
Cranston	8,159	30.2%	14,853	55.0%	3,716	13.8%	278	1.0%	27,006
Cumberland	4,661	39.9%	4,325	37.0%	2,478	21.2%	220	1.9%	11,684
East Greenwich	2,364	42.3%	2,315	41.4%	848	15.2%	65	1.2%	5,592
East Providence	5,958	43.5%	3,718	27.1%	3,804	27.8%	225	1.6%	13,705
Exeter	771	28.4%	1,147	42.3%	742	27.3%	53	2.0%	2,713
Foster	534	28.0%	732	38.3%	604	31.6%	40	2.1%	1,910
Glocester	963	27.2%	1,503	42.5%	1,019	28.8%	55	1.5%	3,540
Hopkinton	836	30.9%	1,080	39.9%	723	26.7%	68	2.3%	2,707
Jamestown	1,325	46.2%	901	31.4%	590	20.6%	63	1.9%	2,879
Johnston	3,270	32.6%	4,502	44.9%	2,126	21.2%	134	1.5%	10,032
Lincoln	2,974	36.2%	3,249	39.6%	1,870	22.8%	119	1.4%	8,212
Little Compton	674	41.2%	648	39.7%	288	17.6%	22	1.4%	1,632
Middletown	2,241	41.9%	1,902	35.5%	1,090	20.4%	119	2.3%	5,352
Narragansett	2,395	39.3%	2,410	39.6%	1,198	19.7%	84	1.4%	6,087
New Shoreham	365	50.3%	174	24.0%	173	23.8%	14	1.9%	726
Newport	3,734	49.4%	2,312	30.6%	1,331	17.6%	177	2.3%	7,554
North Kingstown	4,166	37.6%	4,305	38.8%	2,422	21.8%	195	1.7%	11,088
North Providence	4,013	36.1%	4,505	40.6%	2,414	21.7%	170	1.6%	11,102
North Smithfield	1,456	33.2%	1,870	42.7%	986	22.5%	68	1.6%	4,380
Pawtucket	7,144	51.8%	3,391	24.6%	2,960	21.5%	284	2.1%	13,779
Portsmouth	2,824	41.1%	2,477	36.1%	1,426	20.8%	136	2.0%	6,863
Providence	24,662	65.0%	8,445	22.3%	4,116	10.8%	720	1.9%	37,943
Richmond	851	29.5%	1,153	40.0%	825	28.6%	53	1.8%	2,882
Scituate	1,170	25.5%	2,203	48.1%	1,146	25.0%	63	1.3%	4,582
Smithfield	2,587	33.7%	3,241	42.2%	1,725	22.5%	119	1.6%	7,672
South Kingstown	4,606	43.1%	3,562	33.3%	2,291	21.4%	233	2.2%	10,692
Tiverton	2,090	39.8%	1,882	35.9%	1,173	22.4%	103	2.0%	5,248
Warren	1,118	29.6%	825	21.9%	1,797	47.6%	33	0.9%	3,773
Warwick	10,559	35.0%	11,383	37.7%	7,795	25.8%	428	1.4%	30,165
West Greenwich	605	25.0%	1,097	45.3%	684	28.3%	33	1.3%	2,419
West Warwick	2,836	34.6%	3,235	39.4%	2,000	24.4%	134	1.6%	8,205
Westerly	3,094	41.3%	3,004	40.1%	1,195	16.0%	197	2.6%	7,490
Woonsocket	3,018	40.6%	2,763	37.2%	1,471	19.8%	182	2.4%	7,434
