= RAISE US =

United States nonprofit organization

RAISE US is a 501(c)(3) nonprofit organization created to address the disruption to American workers caused by artificial intelligence. It has received over $500 million from major corporations including OpenAI, Amazon, Anthropic, and Bank of America. It is co-chaired by former Indiana governor Eric Holcomb and Gina Raimondo, the former governor of Rhode Island and United States Secretary of Commerce, who also is CEO.
