= Executive Office of Health and Human Services =

Agency overview
- Formed: 2006
- Jurisdiction: Rhode Island Government
- Headquarters: 3 West Road; Cranston, Rhode Island 02920
- Agency executive: Womazetta Jones, Secretary of the Executive Office of Health and Human Services
- Parent agency: State of Rhode Island; Executive Office of the Governor
- Child agency: Department of Behavioral Healthcare, Developmental Disabilities and Hospitals Department of Children, Youth & Families Department of Health Department of Human Services RI Medicaid
- Website: http://www.eohhs.ri.gov/

The Executive Office of Health and Human Services is a cabinet-level agency in Rhode Island. The current EOHHS Secretary is Womazetta Jones.

EOHHS was created by the Rhode Island General Assembly in 2006 and is codified in Title 42 Chapter 7.2 of the R.I. General Laws. The agency serves as an umbrella organization for Rhode Island's healthcare and social services agencies.

== Secretaries ==
Name	Dates served	Appointed by
Steven Costantino	2011–2014	Lincoln Chafee
Elizabeth H. Roberts	2014–2017	Gina Raimondo
Eric J. Beane	2017–2018	Gina Raimondo
Lisa Vura-Weis (acting)	2018–2019	Gina Raimondo
Womazetta Jones	2019–present	Gina Raimondo

== See also ==
- Health department
- List of Rhode Island state agencies
