= Trista Piccola =

Director of the Rhode Island Department of Children, Youth, & Families
- In office January 2017 – July 2019
- Governor: Gina Raimondo
- Preceded by: Jamia McDonald (acting)
- Succeeded by: Kevin Aucoin (acting)

Personal details
- Education: Case Western Reserve University

Trista Piccola served as the director of the Rhode Island Department of Children, Youth & Families (the DCYF) from January 2017 until July 2019. Her term was marked by the death and near-deaths of children, high staff turn-over rates, votes of no confidence, and high budget deficits.

== Personal life ==
Piccola is married to Thomas Pristow, Health and Human Services Director for Coconino County, Arizona.

== Early career ==
Piccola has worked in the child welfare profession for most of her career, and has held positions including Child Protective Services officer in various states and eventually becoming a deputy director for Cuyahoga County's Health and Human Services agency where she was responsible for the county child welfare system.

== Appointment as DCYF director ==
Following a "robust national search and selection process", Piccola was chosen by Rhode Island Governor Gina Raimondo and State Health and Human Services Secretary Elizabeth H. Roberts to lead the DCYF. Following a process which required the advice and consent of Piccola's appointment to the directorship by the Rhode Island Senate, she succeeded Acting DCYF Director Jamia McDonald and became the permanent director, responsible for the DCYF's staffing, budget, and child welfare and protection mission.

== Vote of no confidence ==
DCYF union members overwhelmingly that they had "no confidence" in Piccola following the death of 9-year-old Zha-Nae Rothgeb who was found unresponsive in a bathtub and later pronounced dead in hospital. Rothgeb's adoptive mother, Michele Rothgeb, housed 8 children, all under the care of DCYF. Later, Warwick police found Rothgeb's home filled with rubbish and human waste. She later faced a manslaughter charge.

Piccola accepted that DCYF was responsible for the death of the child, explaining that poor staffing decisions and "inadequate policies" failed to prevent the girl's death. The Rhode Island Office of the Child Advocate later revealed that three DCYF workers were terminated as a result of the death.

== Resignation ==
Rep. Patricia Serpa and Rep. Charlene Lima called for the resignation of Piccola, which finally occurred in July 2019.

Trista Piccola was in the post for merely 2.5 years and cited her reason for leaving being a job offer to her husband, and that they were relocating to the state of Arizona. Piccola was appointed to the directorship in January 2017.
