= 1992 Rhode Island gubernatorial election =

- November 3, 1992
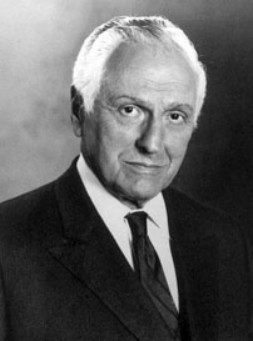

Nominee	Bruce Sundlun	Elizabeth A. Leonard
Party	Democratic	Republican
Popular vote	261,484	145,590
Percentage	61.55%	34.27%
- Sundlun: 50–60% 60–70%
Governor before election
Bruce Sundlun
Democratic
Elected Governor
Bruce Sundlun
Democratic

The 1992 Rhode Island gubernatorial election was held on November 3, 1992. Incumbent Democrat Bruce Sundlun defeated Republican nominee Elizabeth A. Leonard with 61.55% of the vote.

A Democrat would not be elected Governor of Rhode Island again until Gina Raimondo did so in 2014.

== Primary elections ==
Primary elections were held on September 15, 1992.

=== Democratic primary ===
==== Candidates ====
- Bruce Sundlun, incumbent governor
- Francis X. Flaherty, former mayor of Warwick

==== Results ====
Democratic primary results
Party	Candidate	Votes	%
Democratic	Bruce Sundlun (incumbent)	78,735	52.23
Democratic	Francis X. Flaherty	72,011	47.77
Total votes		150,746	100.00

=== Republican primary ===
==== Candidates ====
- Elizabeth A. Leonard, IT professional, and insurance executive
- J. Michael Levesque, Mayor of West Warwick

==== Results ====
Republican primary results
Party	Candidate	Votes	%
Republican	Elizabeth A. Leonard	7,534	52.10
Republican	J. Michael Levesque	6,926	47.90
Total votes		14,460	100.00

== General election ==
=== Candidates ===
Major party candidates

- Bruce Sundlun, Democratic
- Elizabeth A. Leonard, Republican

Other candidates

- Joseph F. Devine, Independent
- Jack D. Potter, Populist
- John J. Staradumsky, Independent

=== Results ===
1992 Rhode Island gubernatorial election
Party	Candidate	Votes	%
Democratic	Bruce Sundlun (incumbent)	261,484	61.55%
Republican	Elizabeth A. Leonard	145,590	34.27%
Independent	Joseph F. Devine	14,511	3.42%
Populist	Jack D. Potter	1,698	0.40%
Independent	John J. Staradumsky	1,535	0.36%
Total votes		424,818	100.00%
Democratic hold			

==== By county ====
	Bruce Sundlun Democratic		Betty Leonard Republican		All Others	
County	Votes	%	Votes	%	Votes	%
Bristol	14,223	61.2%	8,410	36.2%	597	2.5%
Kent	47,746	60.8%	27,145	34.6%	3,675	4.6%
Newport	22,886	64.0%	12,015	33.6%	881	2.5%
Providence	145,250	61.2%	81,276	34.2%	10,923	4.6%
Washington	31,379	63.0%	16,744	33.6%	1,668	3.4%
