= Spencer Dickinson (politician) =

American politician (born 1943)

Spencer E. Dickinson

Member of the Rhode Island House of Representatives from the 35th district
- In office January 3, 2011 – January 3, 2015
- Preceded by: Michael A. Rice
- Succeeded by: Kathleen A. Fogarty

Member of the Rhode Island House of Representatives from the 46th district
- In office January 7, 1975 – January 6, 1981
- Preceded by: Lloyd M. Lucas
- Succeeded by: Norma B. Willis

Member of the Rhode Island House of Representatives from the 47th district
- In office January 2, 1973 – January 7, 1975
- Preceded by: Howard M. Webster
- Succeeded by: Charles Ted Wright

Personal details
- Born: November 7, 1943 (age 82)
- Party: Democratic

Spencer E. Dickinson (born November 7, 1943) is an American politician from South Kingstown and formerly served as a Democratic member of the Rhode Island House of Representatives and candidate for Governor in the 2018 Rhode Island gubernatorial election.

== State representative ==
Dickinson was a member of the Rhode Island House of Representatives between 1973 and 1980 and again from 2010 to 2014 in RI's 35th district, which encompasses the villages of Kingston and West Kingston, and parts of Tuckertown, Wakefield and Peace Dale. Dickinson, a veteran of the General Assembly who served from 1973 to 1980 was motivated to return to the General Assembly in 2010 after 30 years, because he believed the situation in the legislature resembled what existed in 1972 when he first ran, with little transparency or accountability.

In addition to improving governance in the legislature, Dickinson's successful 2010 campaign emphasized fiscal responsibility, rebuilding the state's economy (such as by supporting the University of Rhode Island, which he believes can serve as an important incubator for technology based businesses), and an alternative energy strategy focused on wind power which he believes would reduce dependence on foreign oil while creating construction and technology jobs.

Dickinson was elected to the Rhode Island House of Representatives in 1972 where he served four terms before retiring in 1980. During that time he championed environmental causes such as the Bottle Bill and was part of a group of reformers who, among other things, brought recorded voting to the Rhode Island General Assembly after assuming key leadership positions; Dickinson served as Deputy Majority Leader.

Dickinson is a career home builder who pioneered solar heating in Rhode Island in the 1970s, building the state's first solar heated home, and is a noted local expert in the field of alternative energy.

== 2018 Rhode Island gubernatorial election ==
Dickinson announced his candidacy for Governor of Rhode Island on October 4, 2017. In a statement, he stated that a major issue is the danger from climate change and rising sea levels, with a particular threat being a proposed fracked-gas power plant. He said the current governor seems to want to be on both sides of that issue, and added, "If you make me governor, there will be no fracked-gas power plant in Burrillville." Among other issues, he promised: a true resolution of 38 Studios; a review of pension management and restoring the Cost of Living Adjustment; a serious and detailed approach to bringing health care costs into line by developing a universal health care plan for Rhode Island, as well as advancing women's rights and fairness in the workplace.

== 2022 Congressional campaign ==
Dickinson ran for Rhode Island's 2nd congressional district in the 2022 United States House of Representatives elections in Rhode Island. He finished last in the primary, with 2.3% of the vote.

== See also ==
- Rhode Island gubernatorial election, 2018
- Rhode Island House of Representatives
