= Victor Moffitt =

American politician

Member of the Rhode Island House of Representatives from the 28th district
- In office January 7, 2003 – January 6, 2009
- Preceded by: Scott Guthrie
- Succeeded by: Scott Guthrie

Personal details
- Born: February 2, 1950 (age 76) West Warwick, Rhode Island
- Party: Republican

Victor Moffitt (born February 2, 1950) is an American politician who served in the Rhode Island House of Representatives from the 28th district from 2003 to 2009.
