= Robert Nardolillo =

American politician

Member of the Rhode Island House of Representatives from the 28th district
- In office January 6, 2015 – December 31, 2018
- Preceded by: Scott Guthrie
- Succeeded by: George Nardone

Personal details
- Born: July 7, 1979 (age 47)
- Party: Republican
- Education: Arapahoe Community College

Robert A. Nardolillo (born July 7, 1979) is an American politician and a Republican member of the Rhode Island House of Representatives representing District 28 from 2015 to 2018.

Nardolillo ran in the 2018 U.S. Senate election in Rhode Island but eventually withdrew his candidacy for the seat.

== Education ==
Nardolillo graduated from La Salle Military Academy in 1997 and received an Associate of Arts degree in applied sciences from Arapahoe Community College in Littleton, Colorado in 2002.

== Electoral history ==
2016 Election for Rhode Island's 28th House District
Party	Candidate	Votes	%
Republican	Robert A. Nardolillo	4,288	63.38
Democratic	Ryan M. Hall	2,463	36.40
Write-In	Others	15	0.22
Total votes		6,766	100

2014 Election for Rhode Island's 28th House District
Party	Candidate	Votes	%
Democratic	Scott J. Guthrie	1,845	35.28
Republican	Robert A. Nardolillo	3,374	64.51
Write-In	Others	11	0.21
Total votes		5,230	100
