= Moderate Party of Rhode Island =

- Chairperson: William Gilbert
- Founder: Ken Block
- Founded: 2007; 19 years ago
- Dissolved: c. 2023
- Headquarters: Providence, Rhode Island, U.S.
- Ideology: Fiscal conservatism
- Political position: Center
- Colors: Blue, Red

Website
- Official website at the Wayback Machine (archived 2025-07-01)

The Moderate Party of Rhode Island was a political party in the U.S. state of Rhode Island. The Moderate Party of Rhode Island gained official party status and ballot access via a federal lawsuit and the gathering of 34,000 signatures on August 18, 2009. During its existence, the Moderate Party was the third-largest contemporary party in the state, after the Democratic Party and the Republican Party. However, following the 2018 gubernatorial election, the party lost official status.

The Moderate Party of Rhode Island states that its mission is "to recruit, support, and elect candidates that will govern by building consensus around smart, pragmatic, common-sense policies which will address the structural deficits currently plaguing Rhode Island's economic, educational, ethical and environmental systems".

== History ==
The Moderate party gained official party status and ballot access via a federal lawsuit and the gathering of 34,000 signatures on August 18, 2009. The Moderates fielded candidates for various state offices in the 2010 elections. The Party Founder and 2010 gubernatorial candidate, Kenneth Block, stated that the party's primary focus would be the Rhode Island General Assembly; however, the possibility of further candidates for governor and other state offices was likely.

In 2012, the Moderate Party fielded lawyer Nick Gelfuso for a Rhode Island Senate seat, realtor Joseph Botelho, Jr. for a Rhode Island House of Representatives seat, and three candidates in local elections. All were unsuccessful. The following year, party founder Kenneth Block left the Moderate Party and closed down the campaign accounts, website, and social media accounts. However, the party's status as an officially state-recognized political party remained. The legal status included the right to ballot access in the 2014 elections.

The Moderate Party's candidate for the 2014 gubernatorial election, James Spooner, withdrew for health reasons. Perennial third-party candidate and former Cool Moose Party founder Robert J. Healey was selected to replace Spooner on the November ballot. Following his speedy nomination, the Rhode Island Republican Party filed a claim with the board of elections contesting the appointment. Representing himself, Healey successfully argued that his Moderate Party candidacy was legitimate. Healey won 21.38% of the statewide vote in the election, came in second in Bristol County, and won two of the three municipalities in that county. He also came in second in several other municipalities in Providence and Kent counties.

In August 2018 Tony Jones was appointed to the North Kingstown School Committee making him the first ever Moderate in public office.

Following the 2018 gubernatorial election, where Moderate Party nominee William Gilbert earned only 2.7 percent of the vote, the party lost official status. Political parties in Rhode Island must receive at least 5 percent of the vote in the most recent gubernatorial election to have official status. As a result, the Moderate Party is, once again, a minor party.

During the 2022 gubernatorial election the Moderate Party declined to field any nominees. Instead, the party focused on the House election where they ran William Gilbert as their candidate. Gilbert again received 2.7 percent of the vote.

In November 2025, the Rhode Island Current mentioned that there was "little trace left" of the Moderate Party.

== Platform ==
The platform of the Moderate Party was considered centrist under Ken Block's leadership. In 2013, the Moderate Party's website contained sections for their positions on economic, educational, ethical and environmental issues.

=== Economy ===
The Moderate Party of Rhode Island supported:

- Lowering Rhode Island business taxes in line with Massachusetts' business taxes.
- Bringing the total compensation packages (including wages, benefits, pension amounts and pension eligibility) for state employees in line with what private sector workers earn.
- Producing a balanced budget without utilizing selling tobacco settlement funds or revenue anticipation bonds but by reducing spending in general.

=== Education ===
The Moderate Party of Rhode Island supported:

- Converting day care expenditures for low income households into pre-school aid.
- Providing incentives to the best teachers to teach in the toughest schools.
- Evaluating all teachers and administrators annually by administrative, parental, and peer reviews and by standardized test scores and providing incentive pay for the top 15% of performers, while providing mentoring, training and a financial disincentive to the worst 15% of performers.
- Providing life skills courses to non-college-tracked students.
- Allowing non-certified professionals in certain content areas to teach in public schools.
- Applying policies used by Rhode Island's charter schools to the public educational system, and allowing the development for more charter schools in the state.
- Publishing what they say is a "model" teacher's contract.
- Making state aid to local school districts contingent on how closely the locally negotiated teacher's contract adheres to the model contract.

=== Ethics ===
The Moderate Party of Rhode Island supported toughening ethics laws and employment agreements, claiming it makes elected, appointed, and employed state officials far more accountable for their actions.

=== Environment ===
The Moderate Party of Rhode Island supported what they have termed an aggressive program of protection and enhancement in conjunction with encouraging economic growth opportunities.

=== Social issues ===
The Moderate Party, as a whole, took no official stand on "social issues," and each individual candidate, if elected, would be directed to vote their conscience. The focus of the party was the economy, education, ethics, and environment of Rhode Island, which they referred to as "the 4 E's".
