= Joe Trillo =

American politician

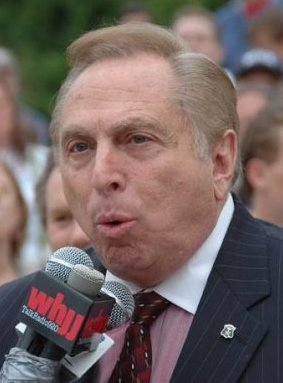

Member of the Rhode Island House of Representatives from the 24th district
- In office January 2001 – January 2017
- Preceded by: Russell Bramley
- Succeeded by: Evan Shanley

Personal details
- Born: February 10, 1943 (age 83) Providence, Rhode Island, U.S.
- Party: Republican (before 2017); Independent (2017–present)
- Spouse: Marilyn Cocozza
- Education: Emerson College (BA)
- Website: Campaign website

Joseph A. Trillo (born 1943) is an American politician who served as a member of the Rhode Island House of Representatives from 2001 to 2017. During his tenure, he served as House deputy minority leader.

== Career ==
Trillo was elected to the Rhode Island House of Representatives in November 2000 and assumed office in January 2001. He is also a former national committeeman for the Rhode Island Republican Party. He was co-chair of Donald Trump's 2016 presidential campaign for Rhode Island; he said in 2018: "You know, I am amazed how the media and his critics still try to paint his first year as anything but a success." Trillo announced his candidacy as an independent for governor of Rhode Island on December 5, 2017. He would come in 3rd place with 4.4% of the vote.

== Personal life ==
Trillo's ancestors are from Isoletta in Ciociaria, Latium, south of Rome.
