= 2010 Rhode Island gubernatorial election =

- November 2, 2010

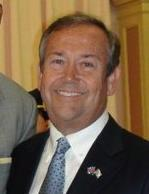

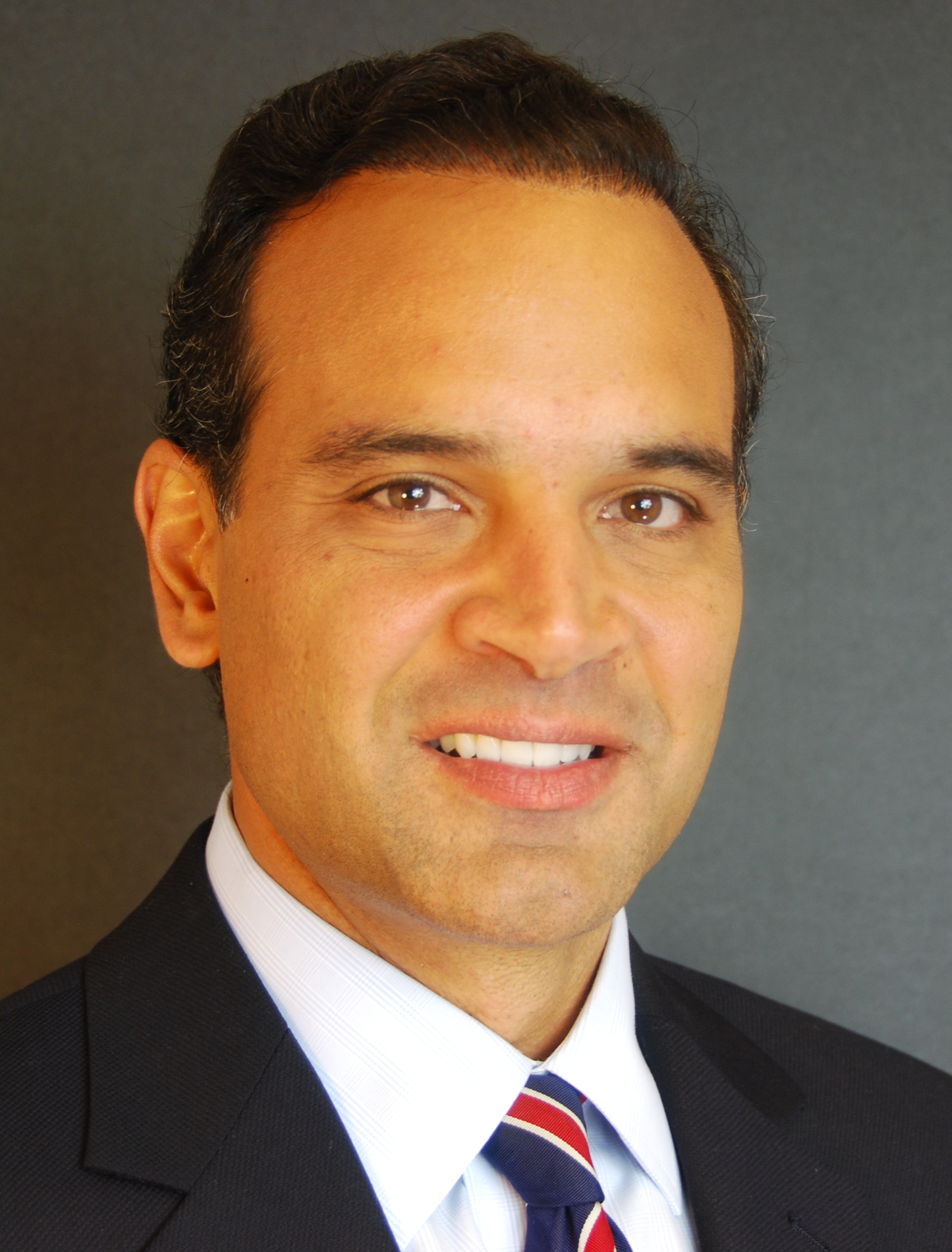

Nominee	Lincoln Chafee	John Robitaille
Party	Independent	Republican
Popular vote	123,571	114,911
Percentage	36.10%	33.57%
Nominee	Frank Caprio	Ken Block
Party	Democratic	Moderate
Popular vote	78,896	22,146
Percentage	23.05%	6.47%
- Chafee: 30–40% 40–50% 50–60% Robitaille: 30–40% 40–50% Caprio: 30–40%
Governor before election
Donald Carcieri
Republican
Elected Governor
Lincoln Chafee
Independent

The 2010 Rhode Island gubernatorial election was held in the US state on November 2, 2010. It was preceded by the primary election on September 14, 2010. Incumbent Republican governor Donald Carcieri was term-limited in 2010. The non-partisan Cook Political Report, The New York Times, and CQ Politics rated the gubernatorial election as a toss-up.

With 90 percent of the districts reporting on election night, independent Lincoln Chafee was declared the winner, with 36.1 percent of the vote. As of 2025, this was the last time Newport County voted for the Republican candidate in a statewide election. Chafee had served Rhode Island in the U.S. Senate as a Republican from 1999 to 2007; he later joined the Democratic Party in 2013.

== Republican primary ==
=== Candidates ===
- Victor Moffitt, former state representative
- John Robitaille, businessman

=== Polling ===
Poll source	Dates administered	Steve Laffey	Joseph Trillo
Quest Research	February 24–25, 2009	29.3%	6.9%

=== Results ===
Republican primary results
Party	Candidate	Votes	%
Republican	John Robitaille	13,204	70.17
Republican	Victor Moffitt	5,613	29.83
Total votes		18,817	100.00

== Democratic primary ==
=== Candidates ===
- Frank Caprio, State Treasurer

=== Polling ===
Poll source	Dates administered	Frank Caprio	Patrick C. Lynch	David Cicilline	Elizabeth H. Roberts
Quest Research	February 24–25, 2009	30%	17.4%	13%	12.4%

=== Results ===
Democratic Party primary results
Party	Candidate	Votes	%
Democratic	Frank Caprio	73,142	100.00
Total votes		73,142	100.00

== General election ==
=== Candidates ===
==== Major ====
- Frank Caprio (D)
- Lincoln Chafee (I)
- John Robitaille (R)

==== Minor ====
- Ronald Algieri (I)
- Ken Block (M)
- Todd Giroux (I)
- Joseph Lusi (I)

==== Campaign ====
The campaign drew nationwide attention in late October when President Barack Obama, a Democrat, faced with a choice between Democrat Caprio and independent Chafee (who, although he had been a Republican as a senator, had endorsed Obama for president in 2008) chose not to make any endorsement in the race. Caprio responded to the lack of an endorsement by his fellow Democrat by stating that the President "can take his endorsement and really shove it as far as I'm concerned."

=== Predictions ===
Source	Ranking	As of
Cook Political Report	Tossup	October 14, 2010
Rothenberg	Lean I (flip)	October 28, 2010
RealClearPolitics	Tossup	November 1, 2010
Sabato's Crystal Ball	Lean I (flip)	October 28, 2010
CQ Politics	Tossup	October 28, 2010

=== Polling ===
Poll source	Dates administered	Lincoln Chafee (I)	Frank Caprio (D)	John Robitaille (R)	Ken Block (M)
WJAR Channel 10	October 23–26, 2010	35%	25%	28%	2%
Rasmussen Reports	October 21, 2010	35%	28%	25%	—
WJAR Channel 10	October 4–6, 2010	33%	37%	22%	2%
Rasmussen Reports	October 6, 2010	33%	30%	22%	4%
Brown University	September 27–29, 2010	23%	30%	14%	2%
WPRI-TV	September 22–26, 2010	30%	33%	19%	4%
Rasmussen Reports	September 16, 2010	33%	30%	23%	5%
Quest Research	September 15–17, 2010	24%	36%	13%	2%
Rasmussen Reports	August 17, 2010	32%	38%	20%	—
Brown University	July 27–30, 2010	26%	28%	7%	3%
Rasmussen Reports	July 21, 2010	37%	30%	23%	—
Rasmussen Reports	June 1, 2010	35%	32%	25%	—
Rasmussen Reports	April 21, 2010	33%	34%	21%	—
Rasmussen Reports	February 25, 2010	37%	27%	19%	—
Brown University	February 9–12, 2010	34%	28%	12%	—

=== Results ===
County Flips: Independent Flip / Republican Hold

Rhode Island gubernatorial election, 2010
Party	Candidate	Votes	%	±%
Independent	Lincoln Chafee	123,571	36.10%	N/A
Republican	John Robitaille	114,911	33.57%	−17.44%
Democratic	Frank Caprio	78,896	23.05%	−25.94%
Moderate	Ken Block	22,146	6.47%	
Independent	Joeseph Lusi	1,091	0.32%	
Independent	Todd Giroux	882	0.26%	
Independent	Ronald Algieri	793	0.23%	
Plurality		8,660	2.53%	+0.51%
Turnout		342,290		
Independent gain from Republican		Swing		

==== By county ====
	Lincoln Chafee Independent		John Robitaille Republican		Frank Caprio Democratic		Kenneth Block Moderate		Others		Total
County	Votes	%	Votes	%	Votes	%	Votes	%	Votes	%	Total
Bristol	7,323	37.04%	6,796	34.37%	3,950	19.98%	1,547	7.82%	155	0.78%	19,771
Kent	22,563	35.62%	23,303	36.79%	12,199	19.26%	4,745	7.49%	533	0.85%	63,343
Newport	11,313	37.55%	11,885	39.45%	5,165	17.15%	1,497	4.97%	264	0.88%	30,124
Providence	62,608	34.90%	55,258	30.80%	49,266	27.46%	10,837	6.04%	1,417	0.79%	179,386
Washington	19,734	39.80%	17,637	35.57%	8,192	16.73%	3,518	7.10%	396	0.80%	49,577

Counties that flipped from Republican to Independent

- Bristol (largest municipality: Bristol)
- Washington (largest municipality: South Kingstown)

Counties that flipped from Democratic to Independent

- Providence (largest municipality: Providence)

== See also ==
- United States gubernatorial elections, 2010
