= Rhode Island Department of Children, Youth & Families =

State agency of Rhode Island

Department of Children Youth & Families (DCYF)

Agency overview
- Jurisdiction: Rhode Island
- Headquarters: 101 Friendship Street; Providence, RI
- Employees: 600+
- Annual budget: US$ >220 million (2019)
- Agency executive: Ashley Decker, Director
- Parent agency: Executive Office of Health and Human Services
- Website: www.dcyf.ri.gov

The Rhode Island Department of Children, Youth & Families (DCYF) is a state agency of Rhode Island, headquartered in Downtown Providence. The agency provides services for children and families.

== Juvenile corrections ==
The agency is responsible for the state's juvenile corrections. The Rhode Island Training School (RITS) is a secure residential facility for juvenile delinquents. The facility is also known as the Rhode Island Youth Development Center. RITS is located in Cranston.

A previous facility, with separate facilities for adjudicated boys and girls, was constructed in the 1960s. By the 2000s, there were so few girls adjudicated in Rhode Island that they lived together in one unit and shared day schedules with boys. In the 2000s, the state ordered the construction of a new RITS building. In 2009 Governor of Rhode Island Donald Carcieri proposed that Rhode Island Housing, a state agency that is set up like a corporation, buy the former RITS site in Cranston.

== June 2013 foster care death and abuse ==
In June 2013, a child's arm was broken at DCYF facility Harmony Hill School and a toddler in foster care was found dead.
