= 2014 Rhode Island elections =

- November 4, 2014

A general election was held in the U.S. state of Rhode Island on November 4, 2014. All of Rhode Island's executive officers went up for election as well as a United States Senate seat and both of Rhode Island's two seats in the United States House of Representatives. Primary elections were held on September 9, 2014.

== Governor ==
Incumbent Democratic governor Lincoln Chafee was eligible to run for re-election to a second term, but decided to retire. The Democratic nominee was Rhode Island Treasurer Gina Raimondo and the Republican nominee was Cranston Mayor Allan Fung. Also running were Robert J. Healey of the Moderate Party and two Independent candidates. Raimondo won the gubernatorial election.

2014 Rhode Island gubernatorial election
Party	Candidate	Votes	%
Democratic	Gina Raimondo	131,899	40.7
Republican	Allan Fung	117,428	36.2
Moderate	Robert J. Healey	69,278	21.4
Independent	Kate Fletcher	3,483	1.1
Independent	Leon Kayarian	1,228	0.4
Total votes		323,766	100.0
Democratic hold			

== Lieutenant governor ==
2014 Rhode Island lieutenant gubernatorial election
- November 4, 2014
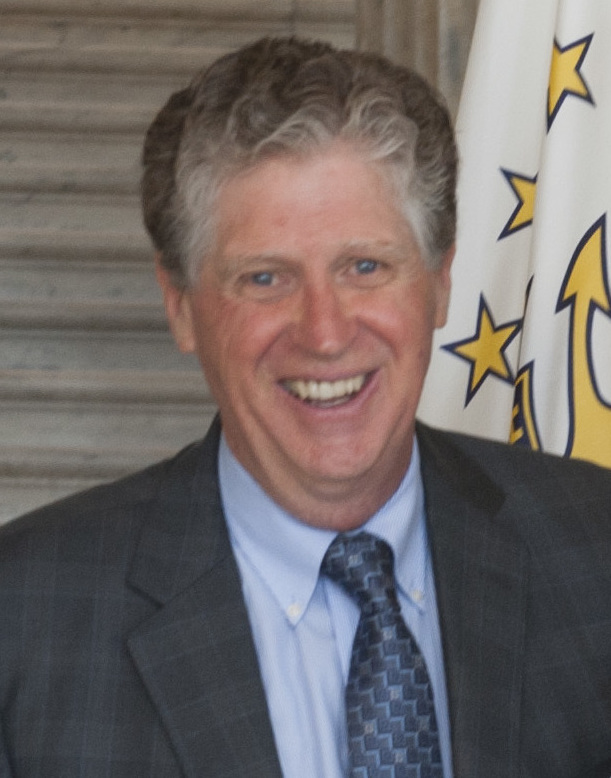

Nominee	Dan McKee	Catherine Terry Taylor	William H. Gilbert
Party	Democratic	Republican	Moderate
Popular vote	169,078	105,305	25,951
Percentage	54.3%	33.8%	8.3%
- McKee: 40–50% 50–60% 60–70% 70–80% Pence: 40–50%
Lieutenant Governor before election
Elizabeth H. Roberts
Democratic
Elected Lieutenant Governor
Dan McKee
Democratic

Incumbent Democratic lieutenant governor of Rhode Island Elizabeth H. Roberts was term-limited and could run for re-election to a third term in office. Democrat Dan McKee won the 2014 general election.

=== Democratic primary ===
State Representative Frank Ferri, Cumberland Mayor Daniel McKee and Secretary of State of Rhode Island A. Ralph Mollis ran for the Democratic nomination, which McKee won with a plurality. State Senator Joshua Miller had considered running, but decided against it.

Poll source	Date(s) administered	Sample size	Margin of error	Frank Ferri	Daniel McKee	A. Ralph Mollis	Undecided
Fleming & Associates	August 11–14, 2014	503	± 4.38%	10%	15%	25%	47%

Democratic primary results
Party	Candidate	Votes	%
Democratic	Daniel McKee	50,229	43.03
Democratic	A. Ralph Mollis	42,525	36.43
Democratic	Frank Ferri	23,970	20.54
Total votes		116,724	100

=== Republican primary ===
Catherine Terry Taylor, a former speechwriter for Senators John Chafee and Lincoln Chafee and the nominee for secretary of state in 2010, resigned as Director of the Division of Elderly Affairs to run. She defeated Kara Young, a conservative activist and perennial candidate. Warwick Mayor Scott Avedisian had considered running, but did not do so.

Republican primary results
Party	Candidate	Votes	%
Republican	Catherine Terry Taylor	17,722	66.74
Republican	Kara D. Young	8,831	33.26
Total votes		26,553	100

=== General election ===
Also on the ballot were Moderate Party nominee William H. Gilbert, a Republican nominee for the state senate in 2012 and Libertarian Tony Jones, a radio host and DJ. Constitution Party nominee Thomas David Gallant withdrew from the race. Democrat Dan McKee won the 2014 general election.

Poll source	Date(s) administered	Sample size	Margin of error	Daniel McKee (D)	Catherine Taylor (R)	William Gilbert (M)	Other	Undecided
Brown University	October 14–17, 2014	1,129	± 2.9%	29%	20%	2%	2%	47%
Fleming & Associates	October 6–9, 2014	505	± 4%	36%	27%	3%	2%	33%

==== Results ====
2014 Rhode Island lieutenant gubernatorial election
Party	Candidate	Votes	%
Democratic	Daniel McKee	169,078	54.3
Republican	Catherine Terry Taylor	105,305	33.8
Moderate	William H. Gilbert	25,951	8.3
Libertarian	Tony Jones	10,221	3.3
n/a	Write-ins	906	0.3
Total votes		311,461	100.0
Democratic hold			

== Attorney General ==
2014 Rhode Island Attorney General election
- November 4, 2014
Nominee	Peter Kilmartin	Dawson Hodgson
Party	Democratic	Republican
Popular vote	177,981	134,444
Percentage	56.9%	43.0%
- Kilmartin: 50–60% 60–70% 70–80% 80–90% Hodgson: 50–60% 60–70%
Attorney General before election
Peter Kilmartin
Democratic
Elected Attorney General
Peter Kilmartin
Democratic

Incumbent Democratic attorney general Peter Kilmartin successfully ran for re-election to a second term in office.

=== Democratic primary ===
Kilmartin was unopposed for the Democratic nomination.

Democratic primary results
Party	Candidate	Votes	%
Democratic	Peter Kilmartin	91,021	100

=== Republican primary ===
State Senator Dawson Hodgson was unopposed for the Republican nomination.

Republican primary results
Party	Candidate	Votes	%
Republican	Dawson Hodgson	23,795	100

=== General election ===
==== Polling ====
Poll source	Date(s) administered	Sample size	Margin of error	Peter Kilmartin (D)	Dawson Hodgson (R)	Other	Undecided
Brown University	October 25–26, 2014	500	± 4.4%	53%	38%	—	10%
Fleming & Associates	October 6–9, 2014	505	± 4%	46%	32%	—	22%

==== Debate ====
2014 Rhode Island Attorney General election debate
No.	Date	Host	Moderator	Link	Democratic	Republican
Key: P Participant A Absent N Not invited I Invited W Withdrawn						
Key: P Participant A Absent N Not invited I Invited W Withdrawn					Peter Kilmartin	Dawson Hodgson
1		WPRI-TV	Ted Nesi; Tim White	YouTube	P	P

==== Results ====
2014 Rhode Island Attorney General election
Party	Candidate	Votes	%
Democratic	Peter Kilmartin (incumbent)	177,981	56.9
Republican	Dawson Hodgson	134,444	43.0
n/a	Write-ins	580	0.2
Total votes		313,005	100.0
Democratic hold			

== Secretary of state ==
2014 Rhode Island Secretary of State election
- November 4, 2014
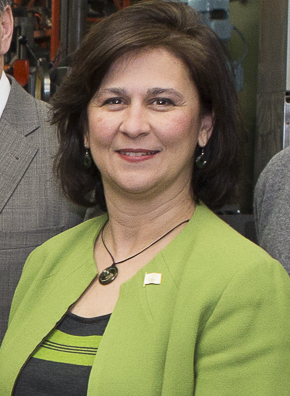

Nominee	Nellie Gorbea	John Carlevale
Party	Democratic	Republican
Popular vote	186,899	121,466
Percentage	60.5%	39.3%
- Gorbea: 50–60% 60–70% 70–80% 80–90% Carlevale: 50–60%
Secretary of State before election
A. Ralph Mollis
Democratic
Elected Secretary of State
Nellie Gorbea
Democratic

Incumbent Democratic secretary of state A. Ralph Mollis was term-limited and could not run for re-election to a third term in office. He instead ran unsuccessfully for the Democratic nomination for lieutenant governor. Nellie Gorbea won the 2014 general election.

=== Democratic primary ===
Former deputy secretary of state and former executive director of HousingWorks RI Nellie Gorbea defeated investor and candidate for secretary of state in 2006 Guillaume de Ramel. Former state representative and former chairman of the Rhode Island Democratic Party Edwin R. Pacheco had declared his candidacy in April 2013, but he withdrew from the race in October 2013 and endorsed de Ramel. Providence City Councillor Terry Hassett had also considered running, but decided to run for re-election instead.

Poll source	Date(s) administered	Sample size	Margin of error	Guillaume de Ramel	Nellie Gorbea	Undecided
Fleming & Associates	August 11–14, 2014	503	± 4.38%	27%	13%	57%

Democratic primary results
Party	Candidate	Votes	%
Democratic	Nellie Gorbea	58,444	51.41
Democratic	Guillaume de Ramel	55,237	48.59
Total votes		113,681	100

=== Republican primary ===
John Carlevale, a retired social worker and perennial candidate for public office was unopposed for the Republican nomination. Catherine Terry Taylor, a former speechwriter for Senators John Chafee and Lincoln Chafee and the nominee for secretary of state in 2010, had considered running, but ran for lieutenant governor instead.

Republican primary results
Party	Candidate	Votes	%
Republican	John Carlevale	23,232	100

=== General election ===
Also on the ballot was Independent candidate Pamela Azar, a teacher.

Poll source	Date(s) administered	Sample size	Margin of error	Nellie Gorbea (D)	John Carlevale (R)	Other	Undecided
Brown University	October 14–17, 2014	1,129	± 2.9%	38%	23%	—	39%
Fleming & Associates	October 6–9, 2014	505	± 4%	41%	27%	—	32%

==== Results ====
2014 Rhode Island Secretary of State election
Party	Candidate	Votes	%
Democratic	Nellie Gorbea	186,899	60.5
Republican	John Carlevale	121,466	39.3
n/a	Write-ins	770	0.2
Total votes		309,135	100.0
Democratic hold			

== General Treasurer ==
2014 Rhode Island General Treasurer election
- November 4, 2014
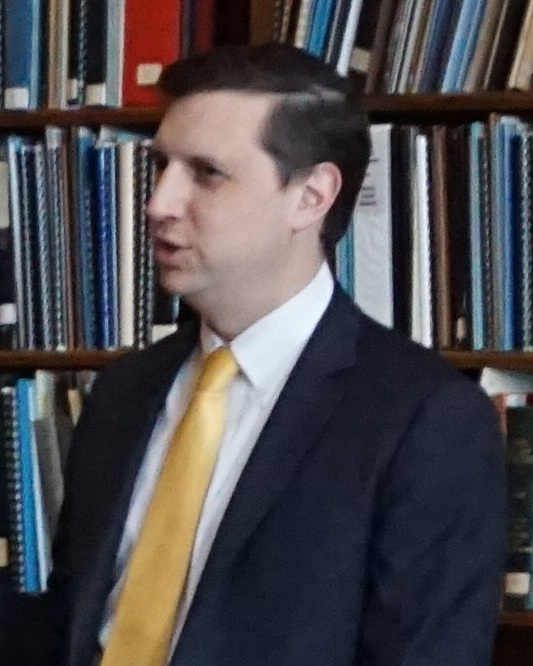

Nominee	Seth Magaziner	Ernie Almonte
Party	Democratic	Independent
Popular vote	175,902	131,423
Percentage	57.1%	42.7%
- Magaziner: 50–60% 60–70% 70–80% Almonte: 50–60% 60–70%
General Treasurer before election
Gina Raimondo
Democratic
Elected General Treasurer
Seth Magaziner
Democratic

Incumbent Democratic General Treasurer Gina Raimondo did not run for re-election to a second term in office. She instead ran successfully for Governor of Rhode Island. Seth Magaziner won the 2014 general election.

=== Democratic primary ===
Investment fund manager Seth Magaziner defeated former general treasurer and nominee for governor in 2010 Frank T. Caprio.

Poll source	Date(s) administered	Sample size	Margin of error	Ernie Almonte	Frank T. Caprio	Seth Magaziner	Undecided
Fleming & Associates	August 11–14, 2014	503	± 4.38%	—	31%	43%	24%
Fleming & Associates	May 27–30, 2014	506	± 4.38%	9%	29%	11%	46%

Democratic primary results
Party	Candidate	Votes	%
Democratic	Seth Magaziner	80,378	66.55
Democratic	Frank T. Caprio	40,402	33.45
Total votes		120,780	100

=== General election ===
No Republican filed to run for the office. Instead, the party rallied around Independent candidate Ernie Almonte, a former Democrat who served as State Auditor General from 1994 to 2010. Seth Magaziner won the general election.

Poll source	Date(s) administered	Sample size	Margin of error	Seth Magaziner (D)	Ernie Almonte (I)	Other	Undecided
Brown University	October 14–17, 2014	1,129	± 2.9%	47%	33.1%	—	19.8%
Fleming & Associates	October 6–9, 2014	505	± 4%	46.7%	34.3%	—	19%

==== Results ====
2014 Rhode Island General Treasurer election
Party	Candidate	Votes	%
Democratic	Seth Magaziner	175,902	57.1
Independent	Ernie Almonte	131,423	42.7
n/a	Write-ins	588	0.2
Total votes		307,913	100.0
Democratic hold			

== United States Senate ==
Incumbent Democratic senator Jack Reed ran successfully for re-election to a fourth term in office. The Republican nominee was former chairman of the Rhode Island Republican Party, former North Kingstown Town Councilman and nominee for Rhode Island's 2nd congressional district in 2008 and 2010 Mark Zaccaria.

United States Senate election in Rhode Island, 2014
Party	Candidate	Votes	%
Democratic	Jack Reed (incumbent)	223,675	70.6
Republican	Mark Zaccaria	92,684	29.2
n/a	Write-ins	539	0.2
Total votes		316,898	100.0
Democratic hold			

== United States House of Representatives ==
Both of Rhode Island's two seats in the United States House of Representatives went up for election in 2014.
