= 2022 Rhode Island Secretary of State election =

- November 8, 2022
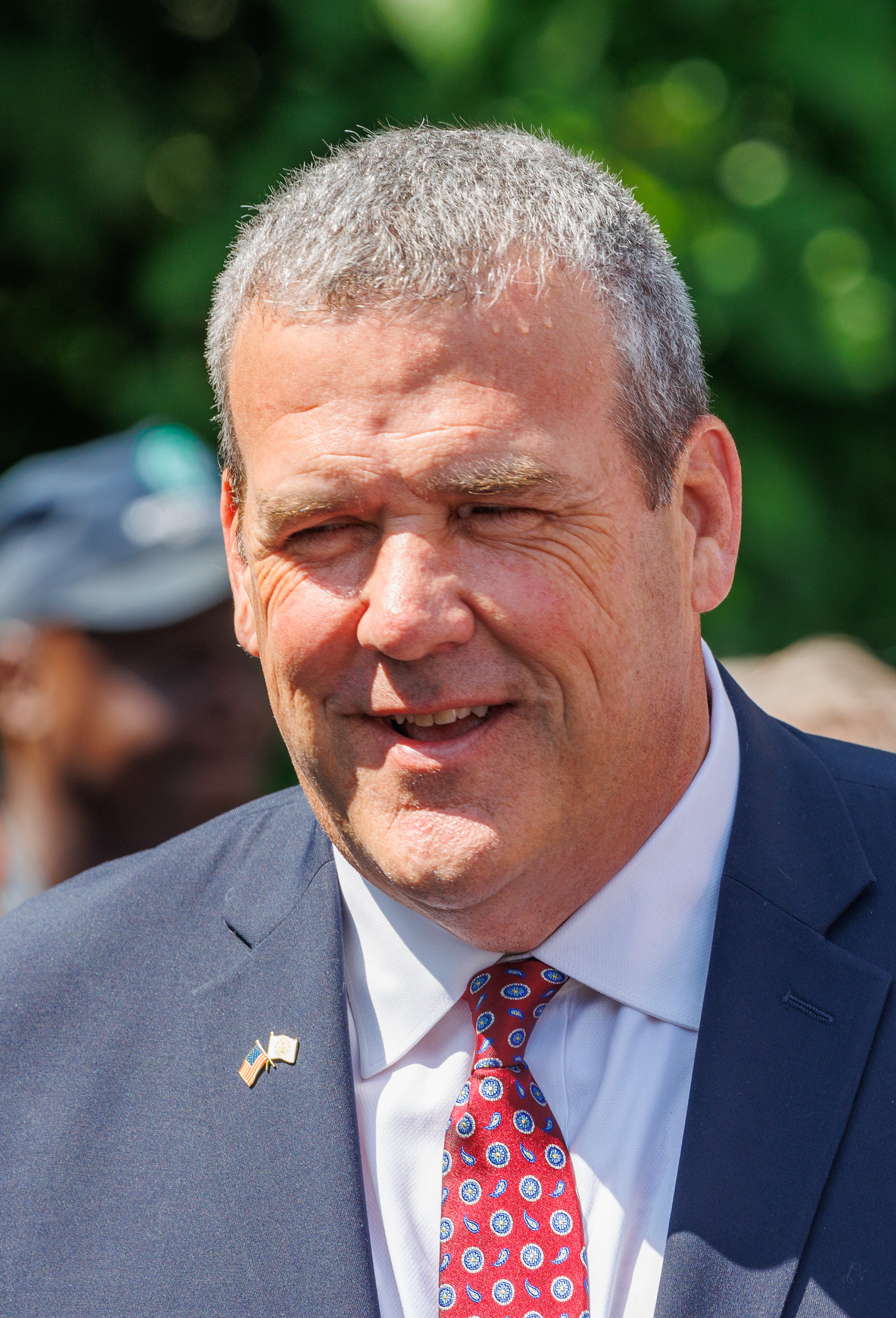

Nominee	Gregg Amore	Pat Cortellessa
Party	Democratic	Republican
Popular vote	208,981	141,457
Percentage	59.54%	40.31%
- Amore: 50–60% 60–70% 70–80% 80–90% Cortellessa: 50–60%
Secretary of State before election
Nellie Gorbea
Democratic
Elected Secretary of State
Gregg Amore
Democratic

The 2022 Rhode Island Secretary of State election was held on November 8, 2022, to elect the next secretary of state of Rhode Island. Incumbent Democrat Nellie Gorbea was term-limited and could not seek re-election.

== Democratic primary ==
=== Candidates ===
==== Nominee ====
- Gregg Amore, state representative

==== Eliminated in primary ====
- Stephanie Beauté, insurance software executive

==== Did not appear on ballot ====
- Anthony N. B. Tamba, realtor

==== Declined ====
- Gayle Goldin, former state senator (accepted a job in the U.S. Department of Labor)
- Liz Tanner, director of the Rhode Island Department of Business Regulation (appointed Rhode Island Secretary of Commerce)

=== Endorsements ===
Gregg Amore

State legislators

- Karen Alzate, state representative
- Katherine Kazarian, state representative
- Valarie Lawson, state senator
- Nicholas Mattiello, former Speaker of the Rhode Island House of Representatives
- Joe Shekarchi, Speaker of the Rhode Island House of Representatives

Organizations

- Rhode Island Democratic Party

Labor unions

- Rhode Island AFL–CIO

=== Forum ===
2022 Rhode Island Secretary of State democratic primary candidate forum
No.	Date	Host	Moderator	Link	Democratic	Democratic
Key: P Participant A Absent N Not invited I Invited W Withdrawn						
Key: P Participant A Absent N Not invited I Invited W Withdrawn					Gregg Amore	Stephanie Beauté
1	Aug. 30, 2022	Rochambeau Library- Providence Community Library		YouTube	P	P

=== Results ===
Democratic primary results
Party	Candidate	Votes	%
Democratic	Gregg Amore	65,276	64.27%
Democratic	Stephanie Beauté	36,283	35.73%
Total votes		101,559	100.0%

== Republican primary ==
=== Candidates ===
==== Nominee ====
- Pat Cortellessa, nominee for secretary of state in 2018 and for state senate in 2020

=== Results ===
Republican primary results
Party	Candidate	Votes	%
Republican	Pat Cortellessa	18,306	100.0%
Total votes		18,306	100.0%

== General election ==
=== Debate ===
2022 Rhode Island Secretary of State debate
No.	Date	Host	Moderator	Link	Democratic	Republican
Key: P Participant A Absent N Not invited I Invited W Withdrawn						
Key: P Participant A Absent N Not invited I Invited W Withdrawn					Gregg Amore	Pat Cortellessa
1		North Kingstown; High School		YouTube	P	P

=== Predictions ===
Source	Ranking	As of
Sabato's Crystal Ball	Safe D	December 1, 2021
Elections Daily	Safe D	November 7, 2022

=== Results ===

2022 Rhode Island Secretary of State election
Party	Candidate	Votes	%	±%
Democratic	Gregg Amore	208,981	59.54%	−7.82%
Republican	Pat Cortellessa	141,457	40.31%	+7.81%
Write-in		527	0.15%	+0.01%
Total votes		350,965	100.0%	
Democratic hold				

==== By county ====
	Gregg Amore Democratic		Pat Cortellessa Republican		Others	
County	Votes	%	Votes	%	Votes	%
Bristol	12,765	63.27%	7,389	36.63%	20	0.1%
Kent	36,439	54.12%	30,794	45.73%	99	0.15%
Newport	19,905	62.77%	11,786	37.16%	22	0.07%
Providence	106,281	61.03%	67,539	38.78%	326	0.19%
Washington	33,591	58.32%	23,949	41.58%	60	0.1%

==== By congressional district ====
Amore won both congressional districts.

District	Amore	Cortellessa	Representative
1st	64%	36%	David Cicilline
2nd	56%	44%	James Langevin (117th Congress)
2nd	56%	44%	Seth Magaziner (118th Congress)
