= Gregg Amore =

American politician from Rhode Island (born 1966)

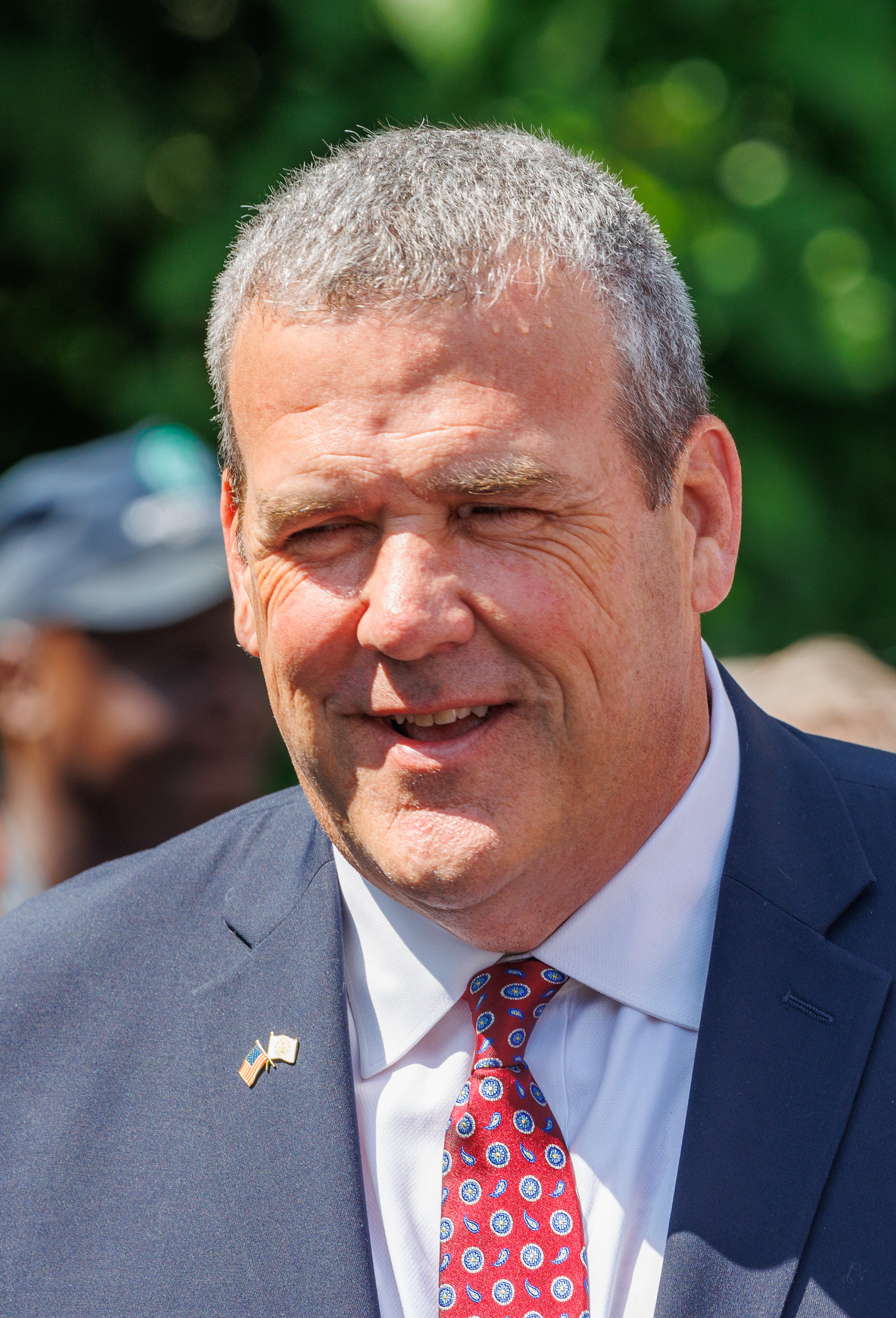
- Amore in 2023

Secretary of State of Rhode Island
- Incumbent
- Assumed office January 3, 2023
- Governor: Dan McKee; Helena Foulkes (elect)
- Preceded by: Nellie Gorbea

Member of the Rhode Island House of Representatives from the 65th district
- In office January 1, 2013 – January 3, 2023
- Preceded by: John Savage
- Succeeded by: Matthew Dawson

Personal details
- Born: October 28, 1966 (age 60)
- Party: Democratic
- Education: Providence College (BA); New England College (MPP)
- Website: Campaign website

Gregg M. Amore (born October 28, 1966) is an American politician currently serving as the Secretary of State of Rhode Island.

== Education ==
Amore attended East Providence High School. He earned his bachelor's degree in history from Providence College and his Master of Public Policy from New England College.

== Career ==
Amore worked at East Providence High School as a civics and history teacher for over 27 years. In 2017, Amore became the East Providence School District athletics administrator, and has also assisted in coaching hockey and baseball at Providence College, La Salle Academy, and at the United States Naval Academy Preparatory School. In 2008, Amore was recognized as the Rhode Island History Teacher of the Year by the Daughters of the American Revolution. He has also served as an advisor to the United States Senate Youth Program.

== State House of Representatives ==
When District 65 Republican Representative John Savage retired and left the seat open in 2012, Amore ran in the three-way Democratic Primary, winning by 61 votes with 845 votes (40.4%). He won the November 6, 2012 General election with 3,898 votes (67.4%) against Joseph Botelho.

Amore has served as Deputy Majority Leader and held a seat on the influential House Finance Committee, chairing its Education Subcommittee. He served as the Chairman of the House Small Business Committee.

Amore did not run for re-election in 2022. He ran for the state's Secretary of State post, a race which he eventually won. Former prosecutor and Democrat Matthew Dawson succeeded Amore in the House of Representatives.

== Secretary of State ==
In September 2021, Amore declared his candidacy for the 2022 Rhode Island Secretary of State election, as Nellie Gorbea was term limited. Amore defeated business executive Stephanie Beauté in the Democratic primary, and businessman Pat Cortellessa in the general election.

Party political offices
Preceded by Nellie Gorbea	Democratic nominee for Secretary of State of Rhode Island; 2022, 2026	Most recent
Political offices
Preceded by Nellie Gorbea	Secretary of State of Rhode Island; 2023–present	Incumbent
