= Stephen Archambault =

American politician

Steve R. Archambault

Member of the Rhode Island Senate from the 22nd district
- In office January 2013 – January 2023
- Preceded by: John Tassoni
- Succeeded by: David Tikoian

Personal details
- Born: August 11, 1965 (age 61) Smithfield, Rhode Island, U.S.
- Party: Democratic
- Spouse: Marie Rodriguez
- Education: American University (BA); Salve Regina University (MS); Roger Williams University (JD)
- Profession: Attorney

Stephen R. Archambault (born August 11, 1965) is an American politician who served as a member of the Rhode Island Senate from District 22 between 2013 and 2023. Archambault was a Democratic candidate for Attorney General of Rhode Island in 2010.

== Education ==
Archambault earned his BA from American University in 1990, his MS in Justice from Salve Regina University in 1996, and his JD from Roger Williams University School of Law in 2000.

== Elections ==
- 2012 When District 22 Democratic Senator John Tassoni retired and left the seat open, Archambault was unopposed for the September 11, 2012 Democratic Primary, winning with 1,626 votes, and won the November 6, 2012 General election with 7,389 votes (59.0%) against Republican nominee Richard Poirier.
- 2010 When Rhode Island Attorney General Patrick C. Lynch was term limited and the position was open, Archambault ran in the three-way September 23, 2010 Democratic Primary, but lost to state Representative Peter Kilmartin, who won the five-way November 2, 2010 General election against Republican nominee Erik Wallin, Moderate candidate Christopher Little, and Independents Keven McKenna and Robert Rainville.
