= Ralph Mollis =

American politician

Secretary of State of Rhode Island
- In office January 1, 2007 – January 6, 2015
- Governor: Donald Carcieri; Lincoln Chafee
- Preceded by: Matt Brown
- Succeeded by: Nellie Gorbea

Personal details
- Born: May 24, 1961 (age 65) North Providence, Rhode Island, U.S.
- Party: Democratic
- Children: Michael, Angelo, and Briana
- Education: Saint Anselm College (BA)

Angelo Ralph Mollis (born May 24, 1961) is an American politician who served as the Secretary of State of Rhode Island from 2007 to 2015. A member of the Democratic Party, he assumed office on January 1, 2007. He was reelected to a second term beginning January 4, 2011 and was succeeded by fellow Democrat Nellie Gorbea on January 6, 2015.

== Career ==
Mollis attended St. Anselm College and the Southern New England School of Law, but he left law school to pursue a career in finance with LAMCO Pension and Investment Advisory Firm, simultaneously serving as Town Councilman of North Providence from 1986 until 1996. Mollis rose to Vice President/Director of Office Operations of LAMCO.

Mollis served as Town Council President in 1993 and 1994 and became mayor of North Providence in January 1997. He was re-elected in 2000 and 2004, In 2006, he was elected Secretary of State. In 2010, voters gave him a second four-year term. As secretary of state, Mollis has pushed various electoral reforms. While he served as the state's chief elections official, Rhode Island broke records for the number of registered voters as well as primary and general election turnout. By law, the Secretary of State also has a number of business-related duties. To make it easier for businesses to meet their state-mandated reporting requirements, Mollis introduced on-line filing of documents such as annual reports. Working with the state's Economic Development Corporation, Mollis rolled out a "We Mean Business" initiative to help start-up and emerging companies get fast answers from government agencies. In his role overseeing the State Archives, Mollis introduces students to state history by bringing historic documents such as Rhode Island's version of the Emancipation Proclamation to schools all over Rhode Island.

Mollis was prevented from running for reelection as Secretary of State in the 2014 elections by term limits. He ran for Lieutenant Governor of Rhode Island, but lost the Democratic Party's nomination to Daniel McKee. In 2017, Mollis was hired as the town manager for North Kingstown, Rhode Island.

Party political offices
Preceded by Matt Brown	Democratic nominee for Secretary of State of Rhode Island; 2006, 2010	Succeeded by Gregg Amore
Political offices
Preceded by Matthew A. Brown	Secretary of State of Rhode Island; 2007–2015	Succeeded by Nellie Gorbea
