= Keable =

Keable is a surname. Notable people with the surname include:

- Cale Keable (born 1976), American politician
- Robert Keable (1887–1927), English writer, Anglican priest and missionary
- Russell Keable, British composer and conductor
- Sasha Keable (born 1994), English singer-songwriter
