= 2022 Rhode Island gubernatorial election =

- November 8, 2022
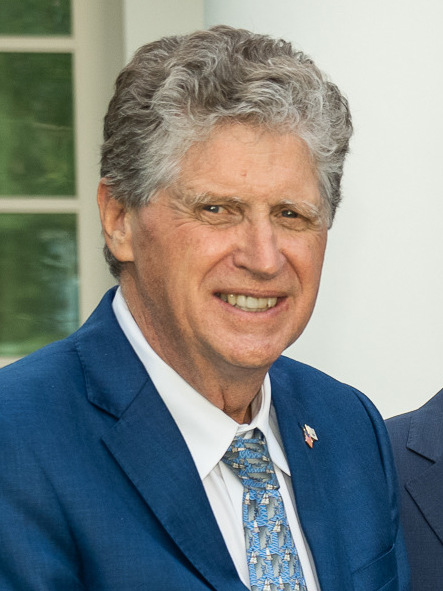

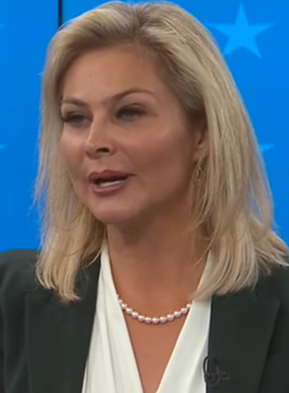
Nominee	Dan McKee	Ashley Kalus
Party	Democratic	Republican
Popular vote	207,166	139,001
Percentage	57.92%	38.86%
- McKee: 40–50% 50–60% 60–70% 70–80% 80–90% >90% Kalus: 40–50% 50–60% 60–70%
Governor before election
Dan McKee
Democratic
Elected Governor
Dan McKee
Democratic

The 2022 Rhode Island gubernatorial election was held on November 8, 2022, to elect the governor of Rhode Island. Incumbent Democratic lieutenant governor Dan McKee became Rhode Island's governor on March 2, 2021, when term-limited Gina Raimondo resigned following her confirmation as United States Secretary of Commerce. Despite a heavily contested primary, McKee easily won a full term on Election Day, defeating Republican Ashley Kalus by more than 19 percentage points.

McKee's margin of victory and vote share was the highest for any candidate for governor of Rhode Island since 1992. This was the first time since that election that Democrats won Kent County, as well as swept every county in a gubernatorial election.

== Democratic primary ==
=== Candidates ===
==== Nominee ====
- Dan McKee, incumbent governor (Note: McKee became governor in 2021 when his predecessor, Gina Raimondo, resigned to become U.S. Secretary of Commerce. Prior to that, he was the lieutenant governor of Rhode Island.)

==== Eliminated in primary ====
- Matt Brown, former Rhode Island secretary of state, candidate for the U.S. Senate in 2006 and candidate for governor in 2018
- Helena Foulkes, former CVS executive, granddaughter of former U.S. senator Thomas Dodd and niece of former U.S. senator Chris Dodd (endorsed McKee)
- Nellie Gorbea, Rhode Island secretary of state
- Luis Daniel Muñoz, physician, community organizer, and independent candidate for governor in 2018

==== Withdrew ====
- Seth Magaziner, Rhode Island general treasurer (ran for the U.S. House)

==== Declined ====
- Jorge Elorza, mayor of Providence
- James Langevin, U.S. representative for Rhode Island's 2nd congressional district and former secretary of state of Rhode Island
- Peter Neronha, attorney general of Rhode Island (ran for re-election)

=== Endorsements ===
Matt Brown

U.S. senators

- Bernie Sanders, U.S. senator from Vermont (2007–present) and candidate for president in 2016 and 2020 (Independent)

State legislators

- Cynthia Mendes, state senator from the 18th district
Helena Foulkes

U.S. representatives

- Patrick J. Kennedy, former U.S. representative for Rhode Island's 1st congressional district (1995–2011)
- Nancy Pelosi, 52nd Speaker of the United States House of Representatives (2019–2023) and U.S. representative for California's 12th congressional district (1987–present)

State legislators

- Joseph Almeida, former state representative from the 12th district
- Maryellen Goodwin, state senator from the 1st district

Local officials

- Jorge Elorza, mayor of Providence

Individuals

- Nicole Alexander-Scott, former director of the Rhode Island Department of Health (2015–2022)

Newspapers

- The Boston Globe
Nellie Gorbea

State legislators

- Karen Alzate, state representative from the 60th district
- Lauren Carson, state representative from the 75th district
- J. Clement "Bud" Cicilline, former state senator
- Terri-Denise Cortvriend, state representative from the 72nd district
- Grace Diaz, state representative from the 11th district and former acting chair of the Rhode Island Democratic Party
- Alana DiMario, state senator from the 36th district
- Susan Donovan, state representative from the 69th district
- John Edwards, state representative from the 70th district and former Majority Whip of the Rhode Island House of Representatives
- Leonela Felix, state representative from the 61st district
- Meghan Kallman, state senator from the 15th district
- Rebecca Kislak, state representative from the 4th district
- Jason Knight, state representative from the 67th district
- Carol Hagan McEntee, state representative from the 33rd district
- Mary Messier, state representative from the 62nd district
- Jim Seveney, state senator from the 11th district
- June Speakman, state representative from the 68th district
- Bridget Valverde, state senator from the 35th district
- Myrth York, former state senator

Organizations

- Clean Water Action Rhode Island
- EMILY's List
- Latino Victory
- Rhode Island Democratic Women’s Caucus
- Rhode Island Federation of Teachers and Health Professionals
- Rhode Island Latino PAC
- RI Association of Dem City and Town Chairs

Labor unions

- Carpenters Union Local 330
- SEIU 1199 New England
- United Food and Commercial Workers Local 328
- United Steelworkers Local 12431
Dan McKee

State officials

- Sabina Matos, lieutenant governor of Rhode Island

State legislators

- Dominick Ruggerio, president of the Rhode Island Senate
- Joe Shekarchi, speaker of the Rhode Island House of Representatives

Local officials

- Lisa Baldelli-Hunt, mayor of Woonsocket
- Steven Contente, Bristol town administrator (Independent)
- Roberto DaSilva, mayor of East Providence
- Phil Gould, Lincoln town administrator (Independent)
- Don Grebien, mayor of Pawtucket
- Charles Lombardi, mayor of North Providence
- Jeff Mutter, mayor of Cumberland
- Jeann-Marie Napolitano, mayor of Newport
- Joe Polisena, mayor of Johnston

Organizations

- Democratic Governors Association
- Rhode Island Democratic Party

Labor unions

- Amalgamated Transit Union
- International Brotherhood of Electrical Workers Local 99
- International Brotherhood of Electrical Workers Local 2323
- International Brotherhood of Teamsters Local 251
- LiUNA RI Laborers’ District Council
- National Education Association Rhode Island
- Rhode Island AFL–CIO
- RI State Association of Fire Fighters
- United Auto Workers Region 9A
- United Nurses and Allied Professionals
Luis Daniel Muñoz

Individuals

- Andrew Yang, entrepreneur, founder of Venture for America, Democratic candidate for president of the United States in 2020 and for mayor of New York City in 2021 (Independent)

Organizations

- Forward Party

=== Polling ===
Graphical summary

Poll source	Date(s) administered	Sample size (Note: Key: A – all adults RV – registered voters LV – likely voters V – unclear)	Margin of error	Matt Brown	Helena Foulkes	Nellie Gorbea	Seth Magaziner	Dan McKee	Luis Daniel Muñoz	Other	Undecided
Fleming & Associates	August 7–10, 2022	405 (LV)	± 4.9%	8%	14%	25%	–	28%	1%	–	21%
Lake Research Partners (D) (Note: This poll was sponsored by Gorbea's campaign)	July 25–27, 2022	500 (LV)	± 4.4%	7%	14%	27%	–	22%	3%	5%	22%
Suffolk University	June 19–22, 2022	353 (LV)	± 5.2%	5%	16%	24%	–	20%	1%	2%	31%
Fleming & Associates	May 9–12, 2022	400 (LV)	± 4.9%	7%	6%	23%	–	25%	2%	–	37%
Lake Research Partners (D)	April 11–14, 2022	600 (LV)	± 4.0%	10%	7%	30%	–	24%	1%	3%	26%
	January 26, 2022	Magaziner withdraws from the race									
Lake Research Partners (D)	November 7–10, 2021	500 (LV)	± 4.4%	6%	4%	24%	16%	26%	–	–	20%

=== Results ===
Results by county McKee: 30–40%; Foulkes: 30–40%

Results by municipality McKee: 20–30%; 30–40%; 40–50%; Foulkes: 30–40%; 40–50%; Gorbea: 30–40%

Democratic primary results
Party	Candidate	Votes	%
Democratic	Dan McKee (incumbent)	37,288	32.82%
Democratic	Helena Foulkes	33,931	29.87%
Democratic	Nellie Gorbea	29,811	26.24%
Democratic	Matt Brown	9,021	7.94%
Democratic	Luis Daniel Muñoz	3,547	3.12%
Total votes		113,598	100.0%

== Republican primary ==
=== Candidates ===
==== Nominee ====
- Ashley Kalus, businesswoman and former gubernatorial aide to Bruce Rauner

==== Eliminated in primary ====
- Jonathan Riccitelli, Independent candidate for lieutenant governor in 2018

==== Declined ====
- Ken Block, businessman, Moderate Party nominee for governor in 2010, and Republican candidate for governor in 2014
- David Darlington, former chair of the Rhode Island Turnpike and Bridge Authority
- Jessica de la Cruz, minority whip of the Rhode Island Senate (ran for U.S. House)
- Blake Filippi, minority leader of the Rhode Island House of Representatives (ran for re-election)
- Allan Fung, former mayor of Cranston and nominee for governor of Rhode Island in 2014 and 2018 (ran for U.S. House)

=== Endorsements ===
Ashley Kalus

Organizations

- Rhode Island Republican Party

=== Results ===
Results by county Kalus: 80–90%

Results by municipality Kalus: 60–70%; 70–80%; 80–90%; >90%

Republican primary results
Party	Candidate	Votes	%
Republican	Ashley Kalus	17,188	83.68%
Republican	Jonathan Riccitelli	3,351	16.32%
Total votes		20,539	100.0%

== Third parties and Independents ==
=== Qualified ===
- Elijah Gizzarelli (Libertarian), veteran
- Zachary Hurwitz (independent), small business owner and undergraduate student at the University of Rhode Island
- Paul Rianna Jr (independent), nursing assistant at Fatima Hospital

==== Declined ====
- Bill Gilbert (Moderate Party), Moderate Party nominee for governor in 2018 and for lieutenant governor in 2014 (ran for U.S. House)

== General election ==
=== Predictions ===
Source	Ranking	As of
The Cook Political Report	Solid D	March 4, 2022
Inside Elections	Solid D	March 4, 2022
Sabato's Crystal Ball	Likely D	January 26, 2022
Politico	Likely D	April 1, 2022
RCP	Likely D	January 10, 2022
Fox News	Likely D	May 12, 2022
538	Solid D	June 30, 2022
Elections Daily	Likely D	November 7, 2022

=== Post-primary endorsements ===
Dan McKee (D)

Individuals

- Jill Biden, First Lady of the United States
Ashley Kalus (R)

State legislators

- Matthew Smith, former speaker of the Rhode Island House of Representatives (Democratic)

Local officials

- Dick Fossa, former mayor of North Providence, Rhode Island (Democratic)

=== Polling ===
Poll source	Date(s) administered	Sample size	Margin of error	Dan McKee (D)	Ashley Kalus (R)	Other	Undecided
Suffolk University	October 1–4, 2022	800 (LV)	± 3.5%	46%	36%	4% (Note: Hurwitz with 2%; Gizzarelli and Rianna with 1%)	14%
Fleming & Associates	September 29 – October 2, 2022	402 (LV)	± 4.9%	45%	32%	7% (Note: Rianna with 3%; Gizzarelli and Hurwitz with 2%)	15%
Echelon Insights	August 31 – September 7, 2022	373 (LV)	± 6.1%	51%	28%	–	21%

Hypothetical polling

Dan McKee vs. Jonathan Riccitelli

Poll source	Date(s) administered	Sample size	Margin of error	Dan McKee (D)	Jonathan Riccitelli (R)	Undecided
Echelon Insights	August 31 – September 7, 2022	373 (LV)	± 6.1%	53%	25%	22%

=== Debates ===
2022 Rhode Island gubernatorial general election debates
No.	Date	Host	Moderator	Link	Democratic	Republican
Key: P Participant						
Key: P Participant					Dan McKee	Ashley Kalus
1	October 11, 2022	WPRI-TV	Ted Nesi; Tim White	YouTube	P	P
1	November 3, 2022	WJAR-TV	Gene Valicenti	C-SPAN	p	p

=== Results ===
2022 Rhode Island gubernatorial election
Party	Candidate	Votes	%	±%
Democratic	Dan McKee (incumbent)	207,166	57.92%	+5.28%
Republican	Ashley Kalus	139,001	38.86%	+1.68%
Independent	Zachary Hurwitz	4,512	1.26%	N/A
Independent	Paul Rianna Jr.	3,123	0.87%	N/A
Libertarian	Elijah Gizzarelli	2,811	0.79%	N/A
Write-in		1,057	0.30%	−0.03%
Total votes		357,670	100.0%	
Turnout			%	
Registered electors				
Democratic hold				

==== By county ====
	Dan McKee Democratic		Ashley Kalus Republican		Others	
County	Votes	%	Votes	%	Votes	%
Bristol	12,724	61.8%	7,134	34.7%	717	3.5%
Kent	36,122	52.8%	30,204	44.1%	2,119	3.1%
Newport	19,964	61.6%	11,397	35.2%	1,037	3.2%
Providence	104,196	58.8%	67,439	38.0%	5,671	3.2%
Washington	34,160	57.9%	22,827	38.7%	1,959	3.4%

===== Counties that flipped from Republican to Democratic =====
- Kent (largest municipality: Warwick)

==== By congressional district ====
McKee won both congressional districts.

District	McKee	Kalus	Representative
1st	62%	35%	David Cicilline
2nd	55%	42%	James Langevin (117th Congress)
2nd	55%	42%	Seth Magaziner (118th Congress)

== Notes ==
Partisan clients
