= John Tassoni =

American politician

Member of the Rhode Island Senate from the 22nd district
- In office January 7, 2003 – January 1, 2013
- Preceded by: J. Michael Lenihan
- Succeeded by: Stephen Archambault

Member of the Rhode Island Senate from the 29th district
- In office January 2, 2001 – January 7, 2003
- Preceded by: Michael Flynn
- Succeeded by: Michael McCaffrey

Personal details
- Born: October 29, 1958 (age 67)
- Party: Democratic

John Tassoni (born October 29, 1958) is an American politician who served in the Rhode Island Senate from 2001 to 2013.
