= Senator Fitzpatrick (disambiguation) =

Benjamin Fitzpatrick (1802–1869) was a U.S. Senator from Alabama from 1848 to 1849 and from 1853 to 1861. Senator Fitzpatrick may also refer to:

- Earl A. Fitzpatrick (1904–1984), Virginia State Senate
- Jack Fitzpatrick (businessman) (1923–2011), Massachusetts State Senate
- Joseph T. Fitzpatrick (1929–2006), Virginia State Senate
- William P. Fitzpatrick (born 1961), Rhode Island State Senate
