= Edwin R. Pacheco =

American politician

Ed Pacheco

Chair of the Rhode Island Democratic Party
- In office April 30, 2010 – April 2013
- Preceded by: Bill Lynch
- Succeeded by: David Caprio

Member of the Rhode Island House of Representatives from the 47th district
- In office January 3, 2005 – January 3, 2011
- Preceded by: ???
- Succeeded by: Cale Keable

Personal details
- Born: October 23, 1981 (age 44)
- Party: Democratic
- Spouse: Claudia Pacheco
- Children: 2
- Education: University of Rhode Island (BA)

Edwin R. Pacheco (born 1981) is a former Democratic member of the Rhode Island House of Representatives, representing the 47th District since 2005. During his tenure sessions, he served on the House Committees on Corporations, Municipal Government, Oversight and Separation of Powers. In May 2010, Pacheco was elected as Chairman of the Democratic Party in Rhode Island.

Pacheco declared his candidacy for the 2014 election for Secretary of State of Rhode Island in April 2013, but he withdrew from the race in October 2013 and endorsed Guillaume de Ramel. Nellie Gorbea defeated de Ramel in the Democratic Party primary election, and won the general election.

Party political offices
Preceded by Bill Lynch	Chair of the Rhode Island Democratic Party; 2010–2013	Succeeded by David Caprio
