= 2018 Rhode Island elections =

- November 6, 2018

A general election was held in the U.S. state of Rhode Island on November 6, 2018. The party primaries for the election occurred on September 12, 2018. All of Rhode Island's executive officers were up for election, as well as Rhode Island's Class I U.S. Senate seat and both of Rhode Island's two seats in the United States House of Representatives.

== Governor ==
Incumbent Democratic governor Gina Raimondo sought re-election to a second term and won, defeating Republican Allan Fung in a rematch.

=== Results ===
Rhode Island gubernatorial election, 2018
Party	Candidate	Votes	%	±%
Democratic	Gina Raimondo (incumbent)	198,122	52.6	+11.9%
Republican	Allan Fung	139,932	37.2	+1.0%
Moderate	Bill Gilbert	10,155	2.7	+2.7%
Compassion	Anne Armstrong	4,191	1.1	+1.1%
Independent	Luis-Daniel Muñoz	6,223	1.7	+1.7%
Independent	Joe Trillo	16,532	4.4	+4.4%
Independent	Write-In	1,246	0.3	+0.1%
Majority		198,122	52.6	+11.9%
Turnout		376,401	100	

== Lieutenant governor ==
2018 Rhode Island lieutenant gubernatorial election
- November 6, 2018
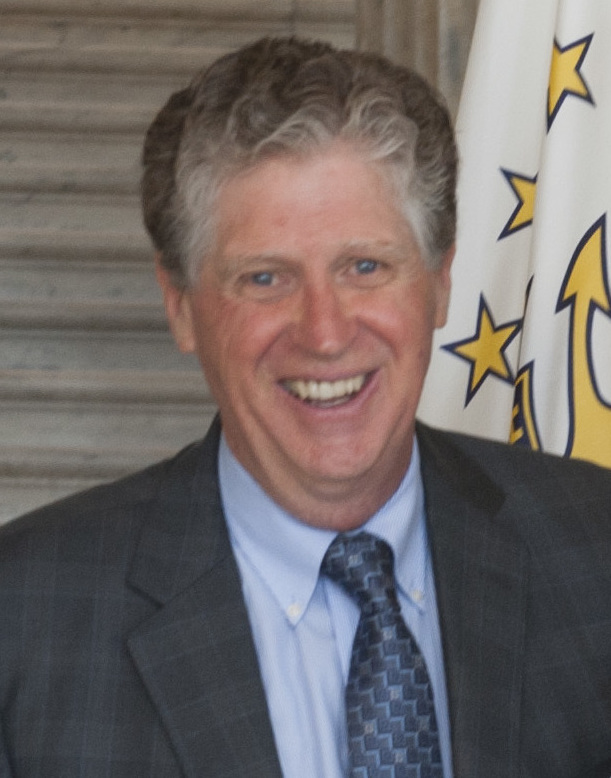

Nominee	Dan McKee	Paul Pence
Party	Democratic	Republican
Popular vote	226,528	106,505
Percentage	61.9%	29.1%
- McKee: 30–40% 40–50% 50–60% 60–70% 70–80% 80–90% 90%+ Pence: 40–50% 50–60%
Lieutenant Governor before election
Dan McKee
Democratic
Elected Lieutenant Governor
Dan McKee
Democratic

Incumbent Democratic lieutenant governor of Rhode Island Daniel McKee sought and won re-election to a second term.

=== Democratic primary ===
- Dan McKee, incumbent Democratic lieutenant governor of Rhode Island
- Aaron Regunberg, state representative (4th District, East Side, Providence)

The two had a debate on WPRI on September 7, 2018.

==== Results ====
Results by municipality: McKee: McKee—50–60%; McKee—60–70%; McKee—70–80%; Regunberg: Regunberg—50–60%; Regunberg—60–80%

Democratic primary results
Party	Candidate	Votes	%
Democratic	Daniel McKee (incumbent)	57,632	51.1
Democratic	Aaron Regunberg	55,230	48.9
Total votes		112,862	100.0

=== Republican primary ===
- Paul Pence, senior specialist in quality management systems and food safety at Toray Plastics

==== Results ====
Republican primary results
Party	Candidate	Votes	%
Republican	Paul E. Pence	25,276	100.0
Total votes		25,276	100.0

=== General election ===
==== Results ====
Rhode Island lieutenant gubernatorial election, 2018
Party	Candidate	Votes	%
Democratic	Daniel McKee (incumbent)	226,528	61.9
Republican	Paul Pence	106,505	29.1
Moderate	Joel Hellmann	11,332	3.1
Independent	Jonathan Riccitelli	9,866	2.7
Independent	Ross McCurdy	9,408	2.6
	Write-ins	2,513	0.7
Total votes		366,152	

== Attorney general ==
2018 Rhode Island Attorney General election
- November 6, 2018
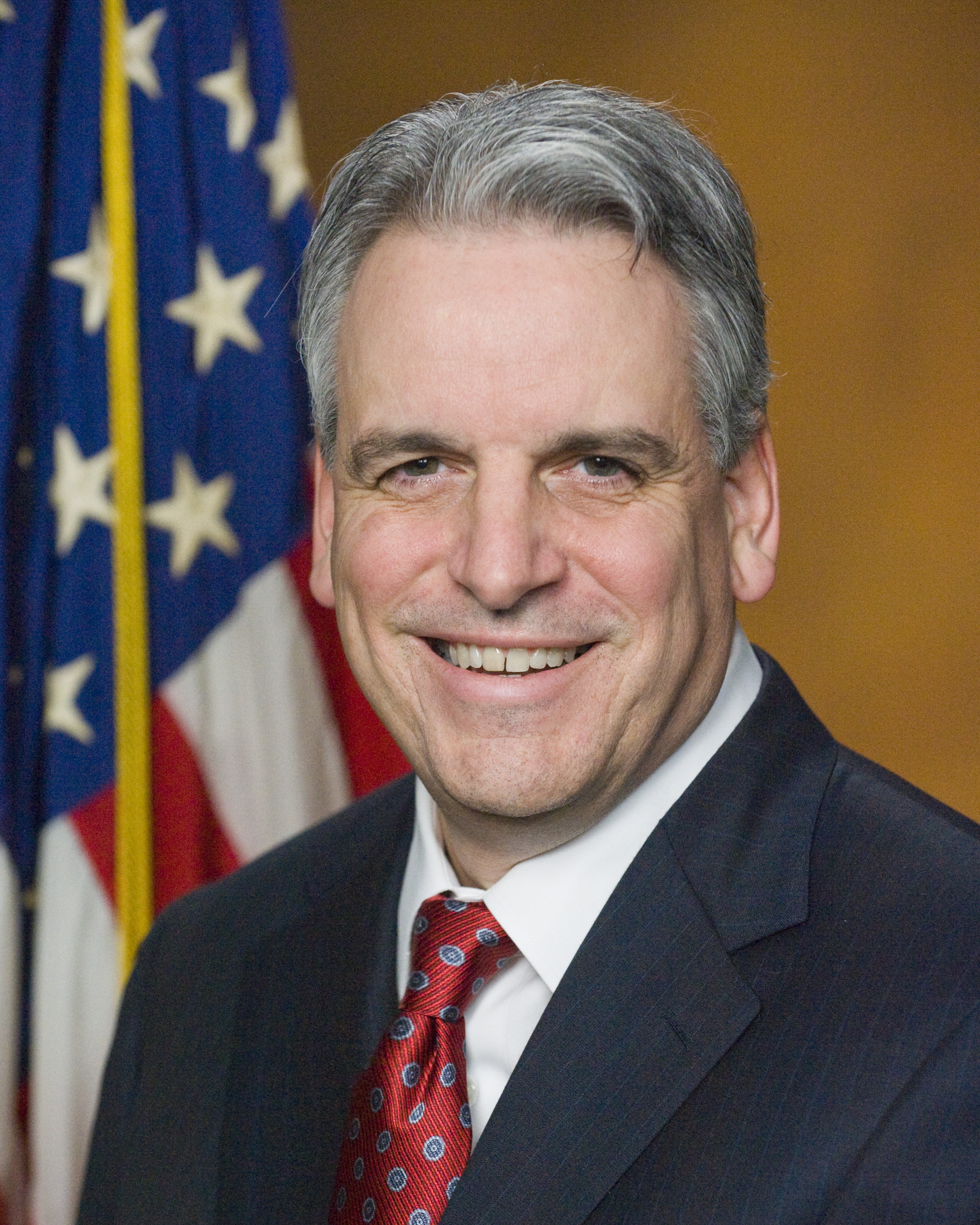

Nominee	Peter Neronha	Alan Gordon
Party	Democratic	Compassion
Popular vote	274,350	65,674
Percentage	79.8%	19.1%
- Neronha: 60–70% 70–80% 80–90% >90%
Attorney General before election
Peter Kilmartin
Democratic
Elected Attorney General
Peter Neronha
Democratic

Incumbent Democratic attorney general Peter Kilmartin was term-limited and could not run for re-election to a third term in office.

=== Democratic primary ===
==== Declared ====
- Peter Neronha, former U.S. attorney of the District of Rhode Island

==== Results ====
Democratic primary results
Party	Candidate	Votes	%
Democratic	Peter F. Neronha	91,273	100.0
Total votes		91,273	100.0

=== General election ===
==== Predictions ====
Source	Ranking	As of
Governing	Safe D	October 26, 2018

==== Results ====
Rhode Island Attorney General election, 2018
Party	Candidate	Votes	%
Democratic	Peter Neronha	274,350	79.83%
Compassion	Alan Gordon	65,674	19.11%
	Write-ins	3,657	1.06%
Total votes		343,681	100.00%

== Secretary of state ==
2018 Rhode Island Secretary of State election
- November 6, 2018
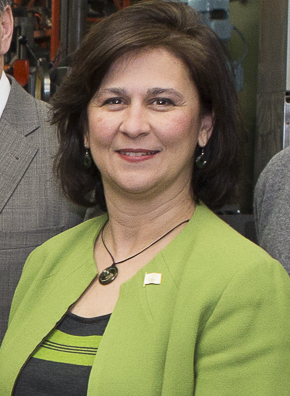

Nominee	Nellie Gorbea	Pat Cortellessa
Party	Democratic	Republican
Popular vote	247,276	119,293
Percentage	67.4%	32.5%
- Gorbea: 50–60% 60–70% 70–80% 80–90% Cortellessa: 50–60%
Secretary of State before election
Nellie Gorbea
Democratic
Elected Secretary of State
Nellie Gorbea
Democratic

Incumbent Democratic Secretary of State Nellie Gorbea won re-election to a second term.

=== Democratic primary ===
==== Results ====
Democratic primary results
Party	Candidate	Votes	%
Democratic	Nellie M. Gorbea (incumbent)	95,103	100.0
Total votes		95,103	100.0

=== Republican primary ===
==== Results ====
Republican primary results
Party	Candidate	Votes	%
Republican	Pat V. Cortellessa	24,965	100.0
Total votes		24,965	100.0

=== General election ===
==== Predictions ====
Source	Ranking	As of
Governing	Safe D	October 11, 2018

==== Results ====
Rhode Island Secretary of State election, 2018
Party	Candidate	Votes	%
Democratic	Nellie Gorbea (incumbent)	247,276	67.4
Republican	Pat Cortellessa	119,293	32.5
	Write-ins	540	0.1
Total votes		367,109	

== General Treasurer ==
2018 Rhode Island General Treasurer election
- November 6, 2018
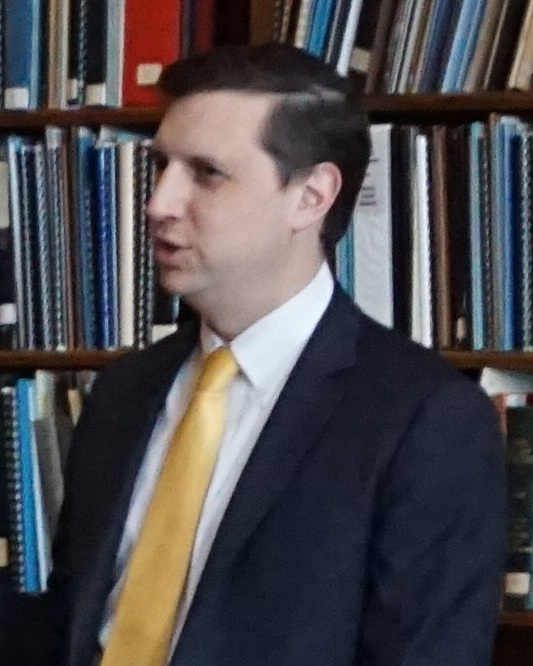

Nominee	Seth Magaziner	Michael Riley
Party	Democratic	Republican
Popular vote	237,575	127,944
Percentage	64.9%	35.0%
- Magaziner: 50–60% 60–70% 70–80% 80–90% Riley: 50–60%
General Treasurer before election
Seth Magaziner
Democratic
Elected General Treasurer
Seth Magaziner
Democratic

Incumbent Democratic General Treasurer Seth Magaziner won re-election to a second term.

=== Democratic primary ===
==== Results ====
Democratic primary results
Party	Candidate	Votes	%
Democratic	Seth Magaziner (incumbent)	93,967	100.0
Total votes		93,967	100.0

=== Republican primary ===
Declared

- Michael Riley, investment advisor

==== Results ====
Republican primary results
Party	Candidate	Votes	%
Republican	Michael G. Riley	25,583	100.0
Total votes		25,583	100.0

=== General election ===
==== Results ====
Rhode Island General Treasurer election, 2018
Party	Candidate	Votes	%
Democratic	Seth Magaziner (incumbent)	237,575	64.9
Republican	Michael Riley	127,944	35.0
	Write-in	539	0.1
Total votes		366,058	100%

== United States Senate ==
Incumbent Democratic senator Sheldon Whitehouse won reelection to a third term.

=== Results ===
United States Senate election in Rhode Island, 2018
Party	Candidate	Votes	%	±%
Democratic	Sheldon Whitehouse (incumbent)	231,477	61.45	−3.36%
Republican	Robert Flanders	144,421	38.33	+3.36%
n/a	Write-ins	840	0.22	N/A
Majority		231,477	61.45	−3.36%
Turnout		376,738	100	

== United States House of Representatives ==
Both of Rhode Island's two seats in the United States House of Representatives were up for election in 2018.
