= David J. Place =

American politician

Minority Whip of the Rhode Island House of Representatives
- Incumbent
- Assumed office June 23, 2022
- Preceded by: Michael Chippendale

Member of the Rhode Island House of Representatives from the 47th district
- Incumbent
- Assumed office January 3, 2018
- Preceded by: Cale Keable

Member of the Burrillville Town Council
- In office 2010–2018

Personal details
- Born: October 20, 1977 (age 48) Biloxi, Mississippi, U.S.
- Party: Republican
- Education: Rhode Island College (BS)
- Website: www.davidjplace.com

Military service
- Branch/service: United States Army
- Years of service: 1996–2006
- Rank: Staff Sergeant
- Battles/wars: Iraq War

David J. Place (born October 20, 1977) is an American politician currently serving as the Rhode Island House of Representatives minority whip and representative for Rhode Island House of Representatives 47th district, serving since 2018. This district composes of most of Burrillville, where Place lives. Place is a member of the Republican Party.

== Early life and military service ==
Place was born in Biloxi, Mississippi to a single mother. Place was raised moving between the towns of Swansea, Massachusetts, Watertown, Massachusetts, and Preston, Connecticut. Place graduated from Joseph Case High School in 1996.

In August 1996, Place enlisted into the United States Army and in November 1996, Place graduated from the United States Army Armor School in Fort Knox, Kentucky. Place was assigned to serve in D Company, 2nd Battalion, 34th Armor Regiment, stationed at Fort Riley, Kansas. Place served with D Company until 1998, when he was reassigned to A Troop, 1st Squadron, 4th U.S. Cavalry, stationed in Schweinfurt, Germany.

On January 30, 2005, Place, now a Staff Sergeant and tank commander, was dispatched to protect a polling station during the first post-war parliamentary elections. Seeing the Iraqis voting inspired Place to pursue a career in politics when he returned home in 2010.

Place married Erin Todisco in July 2007. They have two children. In 2010, Place graduated from Rhode Island College with a Bachelor's degree in accounting.

== Political career ==
Place was first elected to the Burrillville Town Council in 2010, coming fourth place in the General Election, just narrowly defeating Jacqueline Zahn for the fourth and last seat on the council. Place was reelected in 2014, this time coming in second place. Place was also appointed as a member of the Harrisville Fire District Operations Committee in 2015 and elected to a full term in 2016, serving until 2018.

Place sought election to the Rhode Island House of Representatives 47th district seat in 2016, but was narrowly defeated by Cale Keable by a margin of just 2.2%.

Place again sought election to the Rhode Island House of Representatives 47th district seat in 2018, this time defeating Keable by a margin of 13.6%.

Place is a member of the House Judiciary Committee, the House Veterans Affairs Committee, House Innovation, Internet and Technology Committee, House Oversight Committee, and House Rules Committee. He also served as a member of the House Committee on Municipal Government.

On June 23, 2022, Place was named House Minority Whip, following Minority Leader Blake Filippi stepping down and being replaced by former Minority Whip Michael Chippendale.

== Elections ==
- 2010 Place was elected to the Burrillville Town Council, finishing fourth place in the November 2, 2010, General election, with 2,106 votes (11.0%).
- 2014 Place was reelected to the Town Council, finishing second place in the November 4, 2014, General election, with 2,073 votes (12.4%).
- 2016 Place was defeated in the November 8, 2016, General election by Democratic incumbent Representative Cale Keable, losing by with 2,988 votes (48.7%).
- 2018 Place was nominated unopposed in the September 12, 2018, Republican Primary for District 47 Representative, winning with 597 votes and won the November 6, 2018, General election with 2,990 (56.6%) against Democratic incumbent Representative Cale Keable.
- 2020 Place was nominated unopposed in the September 8, 2020, Republican Primary, winning with 255 votes and won the November 3, 2020, General election unopposed with 5890 votes (95.9%).
