= Dawson Hodgson =

American politician

Member of the Rhode Island Senate from the 35th district
- In office January 4, 2011 – January 6, 2015
- Preceded by: J. Michael Lenihan
- Succeeded by: Mark Gee

Personal details
- Born: Dawson Tucker Hodgson; July 10, 1978 (age 48)
- Party: Republican
- Spouse: Megan
- Education: Bucknell University (BA); University of Connecticut (JD)

Dawson Tucker Hodgson (born July 10, 1978) is an American politician and a Republican member of the Rhode Island Senate who represented the 35th district from January 4, 2011 until January 6, 2015. In 2014 he made an unsuccessful bid for Attorney General of Rhode Island.

== Education ==
Hodgson graduated from St. Georges School in Newport Rhode Island and continued his education at Bucknell University and earned his JD from the University of Connecticut School of Law.

== Elections ==
- 2010: When District 35 Democratic Senator J. Michael Lenihan retired and left the seat open, Hodgson was unopposed for the September 23, 2010 Republican Primary, winning with 971 votes, and won the November 2, 2010 General election with 6,006 votes (54.2%) against Democratic nominee Mark Schwager.
- 2012: Hodgson was unopposed for the September 11, 2012 Republican Primary, winning with 1,097 votes, and won the November 6, 2012 General election with 7,886 votes (58.3%) against Democratic nominee Winters Hames.
- 2016: Hodgson resigned as a delegate to that year's 2016 Republican National Convention in order to support Libertarian Gary Johnson for president, instead of the presumptive Republican nominee, Donald Trump.

Rhode Island Senate
Preceded by J. Michael Lenihan	Member of the Rhode Island Senate from the 35th district 2011–2015	Succeeded by Mark Gee
Party political offices
Preceded by Erik B. Wallin	Republican nominee for Attorney General of Rhode Island; 2014	Vacant Title next held by Charles C. Calenda
