= 2026 Rhode Island Secretary of State election =

- November 3, 2026
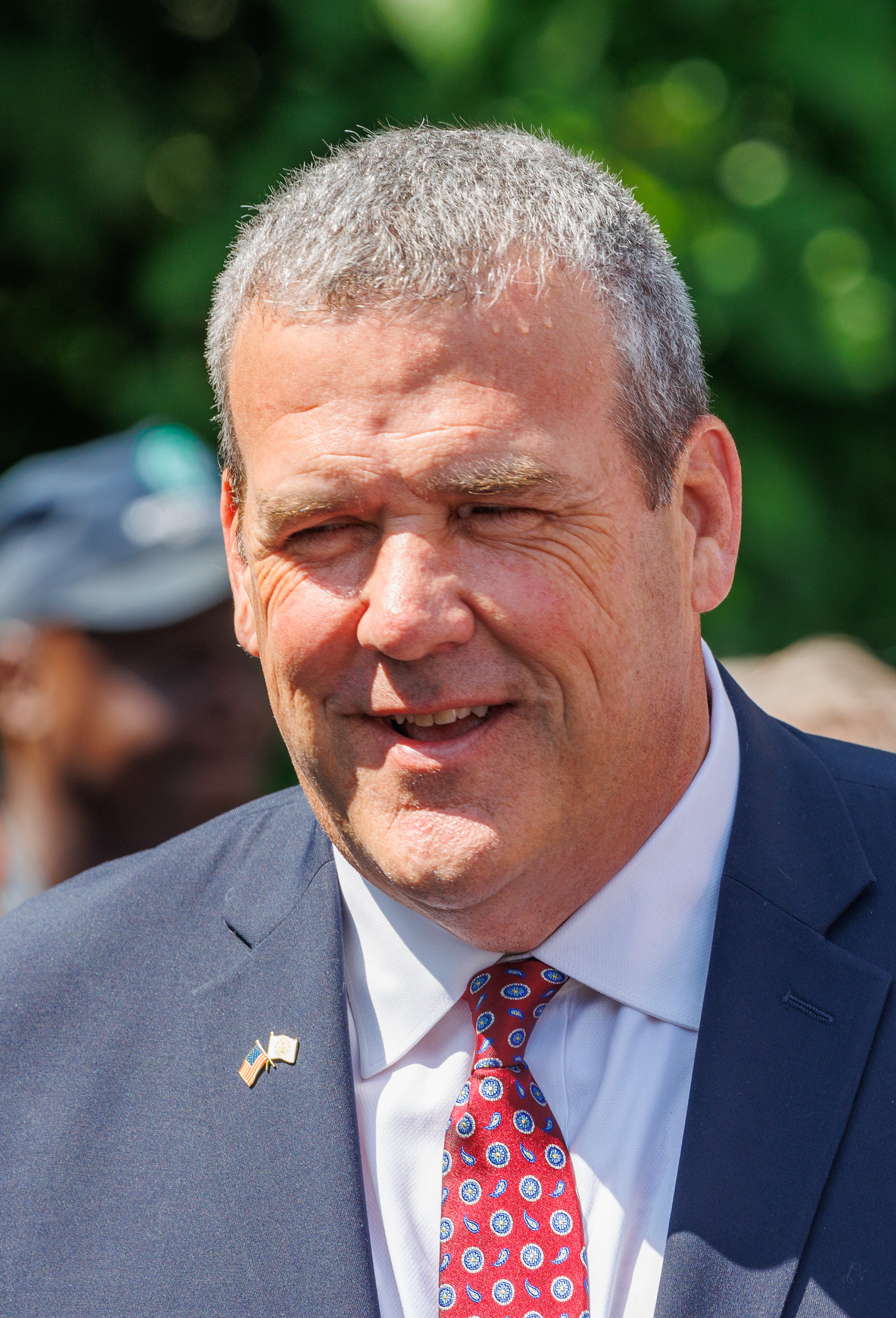
Nominee	Gregg Amore
Party	Democratic
Popular vote	275,149
Percentage	100%
Secretary of State before election
Gregg Amore
Democratic
Elected Secretary of State
Gregg Amore
Democratic

The 2026 Rhode Island Secretary of State election was held on November 3, 2026, to elect the secretary of state of Rhode Island. Democratic incumbent Gregg Amore was re-elected to a second term unopposed.

Primary elections were held on September 9, 2026.

== Democratic primary ==
=== Candidates ===
==== Nominee ====
- Gregg Amore, incumbent secretary of state

==== Disqualified ====
- Anthony Tamba

=== Endorsements ===
Gregg Amore

Labor unions

- AFL-CIO
- National Education Association Rhode Island
- Teamsters Local 251

Organizations

- Planned Parenthood Votes! Rhode Island

Political parties

- Rhode Island Democratic Party

=== Results ===
Democratic primary results
Party	Candidate	Votes	%
Democratic	Gregg Amore (incumbent)	109,203	100.0
Total votes		109,203	100.0

== General election ==
=== Results ===
2026 Rhode Island Secretary of State election
Party	Candidate	Votes	%	±%
Democratic	Gregg Amore (incumbent)	275,149	100.0	
Write-in				
Total votes		275,149	100.0	
