= Dan McKee =

Governor of Rhode Island since 2021

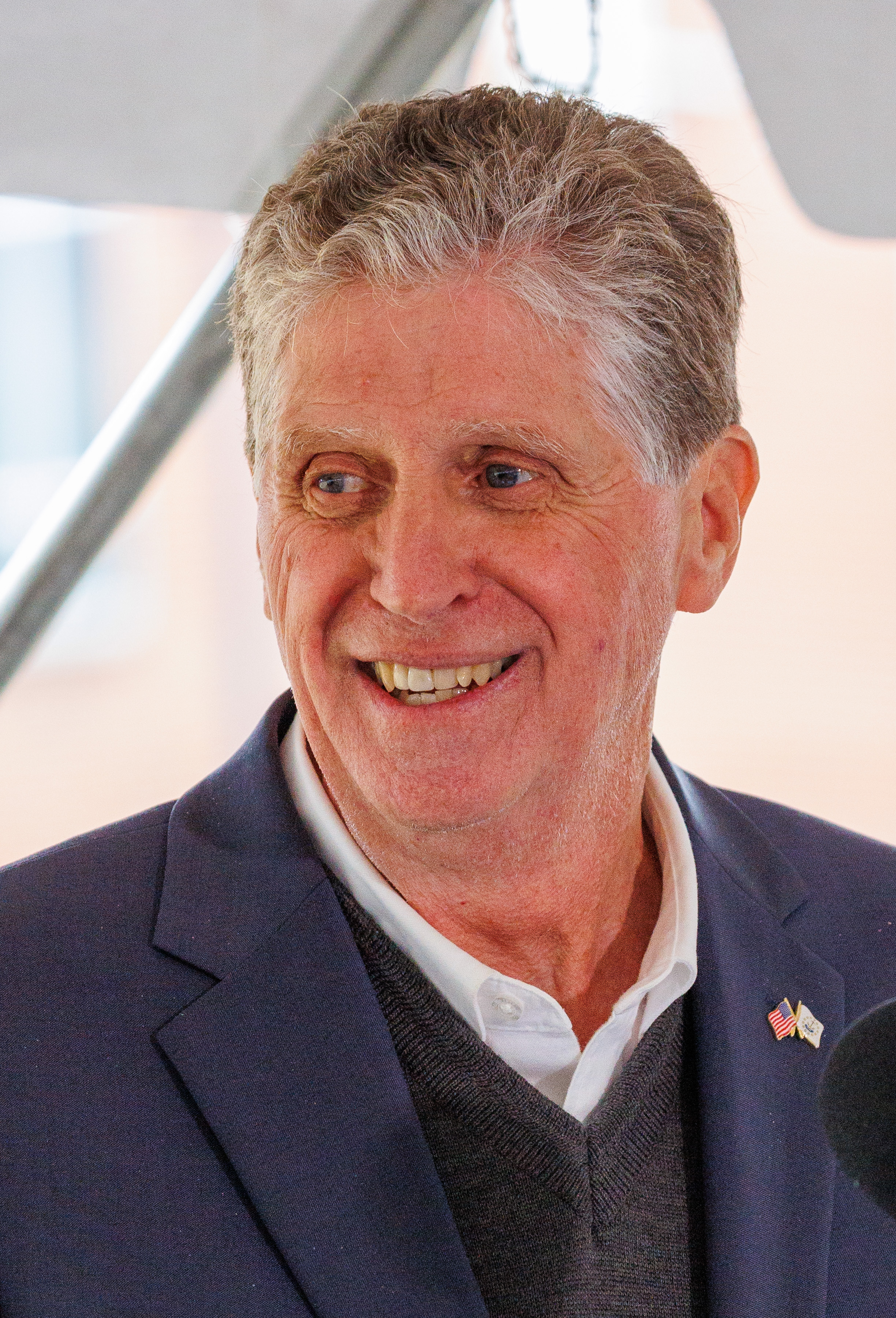
- McKee in 2022

76th Governor of Rhode Island
- Incumbent
- Assumed office March 2, 2021
- Lieutenant: Sabina Matos
- Preceded by: Gina Raimondo

69th Lieutenant Governor of Rhode Island
- In office January 6, 2015 – March 2, 2021
- Governor: Gina Raimondo
- Preceded by: Elizabeth Roberts
- Succeeded by: Sabina Matos

57th Chair of the National Lieutenant Governors Association
- In office 2016–2017
- Preceded by: Kim Reynolds
- Succeeded by: Matt Michels

Mayor of Cumberland
- In office January 7, 2007 – January 6, 2015
- Preceded by: David Iwuc
- Succeeded by: William Murray
- In office January 2001 – January 2005
- Preceded by: Frank Gaschen
- Succeeded by: David Iwuc

Personal details
- Born: June 16, 1951 (age 75) Cumberland, Rhode Island, U.S.
- Party: Democratic
- Spouse: Susan McGill
- Children: 2
- Education: Assumption University (BA); Harvard University (MPA)
- Website: Campaign website

Daniel J. McKee (born June 16, 1951) is an American politician and businessman serving since 2021 as the 76th governor of Rhode Island. A member of the Democratic Party, he served from 2015 to 2021 as Rhode Island's 69th lieutenant governor.

Born in Cumberland, Rhode Island, McKee received his undergraduate degree from Assumption College and received his master's degree from the Harvard Kennedy School. He served on the Cumberland town council from 1992 to 1998 and as mayor of Cumberland twice, from 2000 to 2004 and from 2006 until 2014. McKee was elected lieutenant governor in 2014 and reelected in 2018. When Governor Gina Raimondo resigned upon being confirmed as United States Secretary of Commerce in 2021, McKee ascended to the governorship. He was elected to a full term in 2022. He ran for a second full term in 2026, but lost renomination to Helena Foulkes.

== Early life and education ==
After graduating from Cumberland High School, McKee received a Bachelor of Arts in education and political science from Assumption College in Worcester, Massachusetts, in 1973. He earned a Master of Public Administration from the Harvard Kennedy School in 2005.

== Early career ==
McKee was an officer of McKee Brothers, a heating, air conditioning, and home heating oil delivery business his grandfather founded. He also ran a health and fitness business for more than 30 years.

During his time on the Cumberland, Rhode Island Town Council (1992–1998), McKee was also a basketball coach.

McKee served six terms as Cumberland's mayor.

McKee has been a member of the board of directors of the Boys and Girls Club of Cumberland-Lincoln for over 25 years, serving as past president of the executive board and chair of the endowment committee.

== Lieutenant governor of Rhode Island (2015-2021) ==
In 2013, McKee announced his candidacy for lieutenant governor of Rhode Island. He defeated Secretary of State of Rhode Island Ralph Mollis and State Representative Frank Ferri in the Democratic primary. In the general election, he defeated Republican nominee Catherine Terry Taylor, a legislative aide and speechwriter for U.S. senators John Chafee and Lincoln Chafee, with 54.3% of the vote. He was reelected in 2018.

On January 7, 2021, President-elect Joe Biden selected then-Rhode Island governor Gina Raimondo as Secretary of Commerce. McKee was next in line of succession and became governor once Raimondo was confirmed by the United States Senate on March 2, 2021.

In February 2021, McKee began to form a COVID-19 advisory board. He had criticized the Raimondo administration over a slow COVID-19 vaccine rollout. By February 2022, the McKee administration reported that Rhode Island had 80% of the population fully vaccinated, ranking first in the United States

== Governor of Rhode Island (2021-present) ==
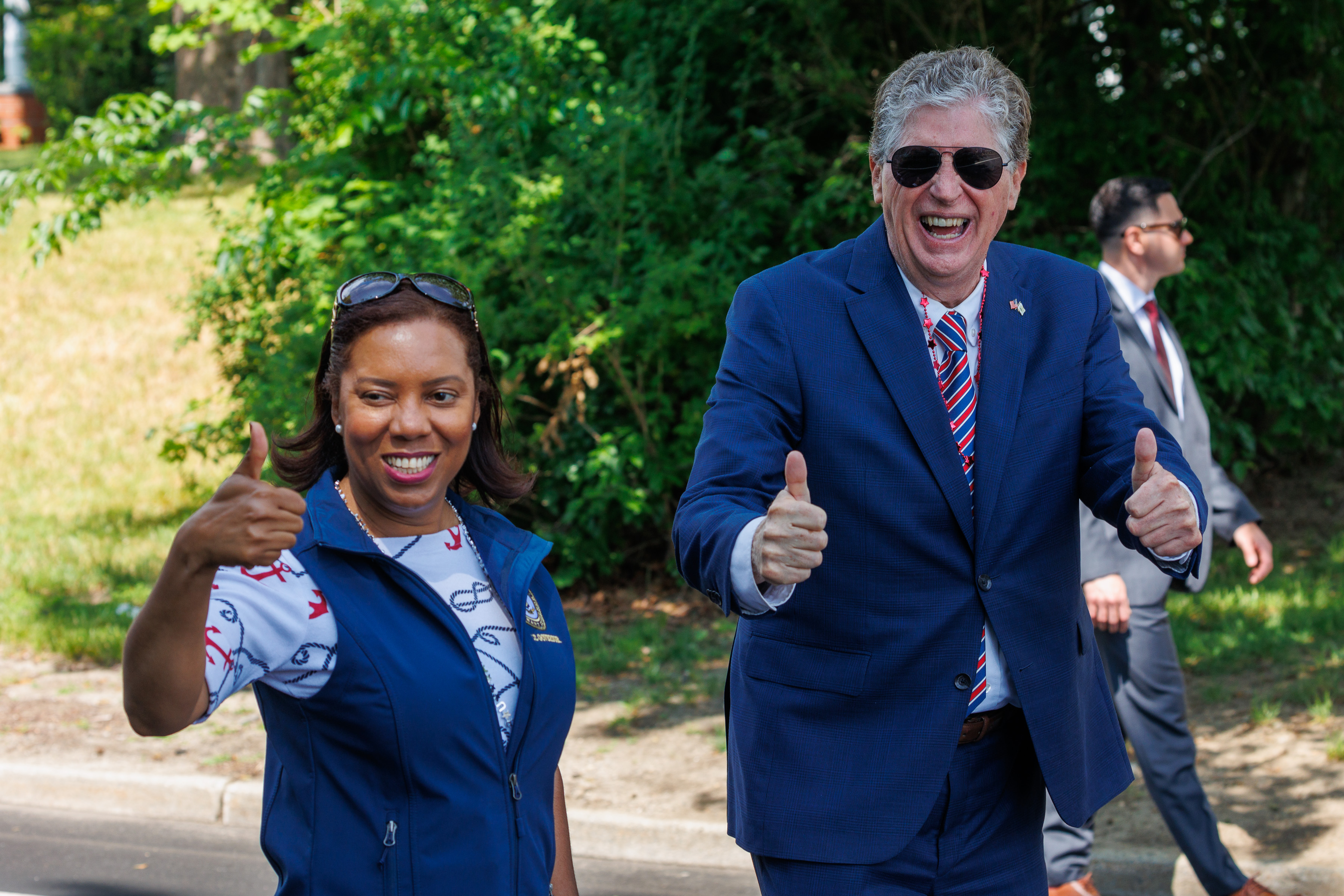
McKee with Lt. Gov. Sabina Matos in 2023

McKee was sworn in as the 76th governor of Rhode Island on March 2, 2021.

In 2021, during the COVID-19 pandemic in Rhode Island, McKee said his main priority was to advance COVID-19 vaccine rollout and contain the outbreak. By July 4, Rhode Island had fully vaccinated over 633,000 people, 70% of its eligible adult population. It was the fifth state to reach that milestone. Also in July, McKee terminated the state mask mandate, but extended the COVID-19 emergency declaration to August 6, citing the prevalence of the highly transmissible Delta variant. On February 8, 2022, McKee announced that Rhode Island would lift mask mandates as the infection rate fell.

In September 2021, McKee signed legislation that reclassified simple possession of 10 grams or less of certain controlled substances as a misdemeanor rather than a felony. He signed the legislation at Project Weber/RENEW's office.

On February 22, 2022, McKee announced that he was running for reelection to a full four-year term. He won the September 13 Democratic primary, defeating four challengers in a close race. He defeated Republican nominee Ashley Kalus in the general election.

As governor, McKee's approval rating has continuously dropped, and he is now one of the nation's least popular governors, largely because of the longtime closure of the Washington Bridge.

McKee supports gun control and has said he would support an assault weapons ban.

== Electoral history ==
=== Mayor of Cumberland ===
2000 Cumberland mayoral election
Primary election
Party	Candidate	Votes	%
Democratic	Dan McKee	4,390	61.48
Democratic	Francis Gaschen	2,750	38.52
Total votes		7,140	100
General election
Democratic	Dan McKee	11,625	100.00
Total votes		11,625	100

2002 Cumberland mayoral election
Party	Candidate	Votes	%
Democratic	Dan McKee (incumbent)	9,131	81.94
Independent	Julian Pytka	2,012	18.06
Total votes		11,143	100

2004 Cumberland mayoral election
Primary election
Party	Candidate	Votes	%
Democratic	David Iwuc	2,666	54.98
Democratic	Dan McKee (incumbent)	2,183	45.02
Total votes		4,849	100

2006 Cumberland mayoral election
Primary election
Party	Candidate	Votes	%
Democratic	Dan McKee	4,331	62.33
Democratic	David Iwuc (incumbent)	2,666	37.67
Total votes		6,997	100
General election
Democratic	Dan McKee	10,612	100.00
Total votes		10,612	100

2008 Cumberland mayoral election
Primary election
Party	Candidate	Votes	%
Democratic	Dan McKee (incumbent)	3,871	64.40
Democratic	David Iwuc	2,140	35.60
Total votes		6,011	100
General election
Democratic	Dan McKee (incumbent)	12,650	100.00
Total votes		12,650	100

2010 Cumberland mayoral election
Party	Candidate	Votes	%
Democratic	Dan McKee (incumbent)	8,091	63.95
Independent	David Iwuc	4,562	36.05
Total votes		12,653	100

2012 Cumberland mayoral election
Party	Candidate	Votes	%
Democratic	Dan McKee (incumbent)	12,667	96.55
Write-in		452	3.45
Total votes		13,119	100

=== Lieutenant governor ===
2014 Rhode Island lieutenant gubernatorial election
Primary election
Party	Candidate	Votes	%
Democratic	Dan McKee	48,634	43.47
Democratic	Ralph Mollis	40,208	35.94
Democratic	Frank Ferri	23,029	20.59
Total votes		111,871	100
General election
Democratic	Dan McKee	169,078	54.29
Republican	Catherine Terry Taylor	105,305	33.81
Moderate	William H. Gilbert	25,951	8.33
Libertarian	Tony Jones	10,221	3.28
Write-in		906	0.29
Total votes		311,461	100

2018 Rhode Island lieutenant gubernatorial election
Primary election
Party	Candidate	Votes	%
Democratic	Dan McKee (incumbent)	57,983	51.09
Democratic	Aaron Regunberg	55,517	48.91
Total votes		133,500	100
General election
Democratic	Dan McKee (incumbent)	226,528	61.87
Republican	Paul Pence	106,505	29.09
Moderate	Joel Hellmann	11,332	3.10
Independent	Jonathan J. Riccitelli	9,866	2.70
Independent	Ross K. McCurdy	9,408	2.57
Write-in		2,513	0.69
Total votes		366,152	100

=== Governor ===
2022 Rhode Island gubernatorial election
Primary election
Party	Candidate	Votes	%
Democratic	Dan McKee (incumbent)	37,288	32.8
Democratic	Helena Foulkes	33,931	29.9
Democratic	Nellie Gorbea	29,811	26.2
Democratic	Matt Brown	9,021	7.9
Democratic	Luis Daniel Muñoz	3,547	3.1
Total votes		113,598	100
General election
Democratic	Dan McKee (incumbent)	207,166	57.9
Republican	Ashley Kalus	139,001	38.9
Independent	Zachary Hurwitz	4,512	1.3
Independent	Paul Rianna	3,123	0.9
Libertarian	Elijah Gizzarelli	2,811	0.8
Write-in		1,057	0.3
Total votes		357,670	100

2026 Rhode Island Democratic gubernatorial primary election
Party	Candidate	Votes	%
Democratic	Helena Foulkes	79,770	62.4
Democratic	Dan McKee (incumbent)	47,983	37.6
Total votes		127,753	100.0

Political offices
Preceded by Elizabeth Roberts	Lieutenant Governor of Rhode Island; 2015–2021	Succeeded by Sabina Matos
Preceded by Gina Raimondo	Governor of Rhode Island; 2021–present	Incumbent
Party political offices
Preceded by Elizabeth Roberts	Democratic nominee for Lieutenant Governor of Rhode Island; 2014, 2018	Succeeded by Sabina Matos
Preceded by Gina Raimondo	Democratic nominee for Governor of Rhode Island; 2022	Succeeded by Helena Foulkes
U.S. order of precedence (ceremonial)
Preceded by JD Vance as Vice President	Order of precedence of the United States; Within Rhode Island	Succeeded by Mayor of city in which event is held
Preceded by JD Vance as Vice President	Order of precedence of the United States; Within Rhode Island	Succeeded by Otherwise Mike Johnson as Speaker of the House
Preceded by Josh Stein as Governor of North Carolina	Order of precedence of the United States; Outside Rhode Island	Succeeded by Phil Scott as Governor of Vermont
