= Helena Foulkes =

American businesswoman (born 1964)

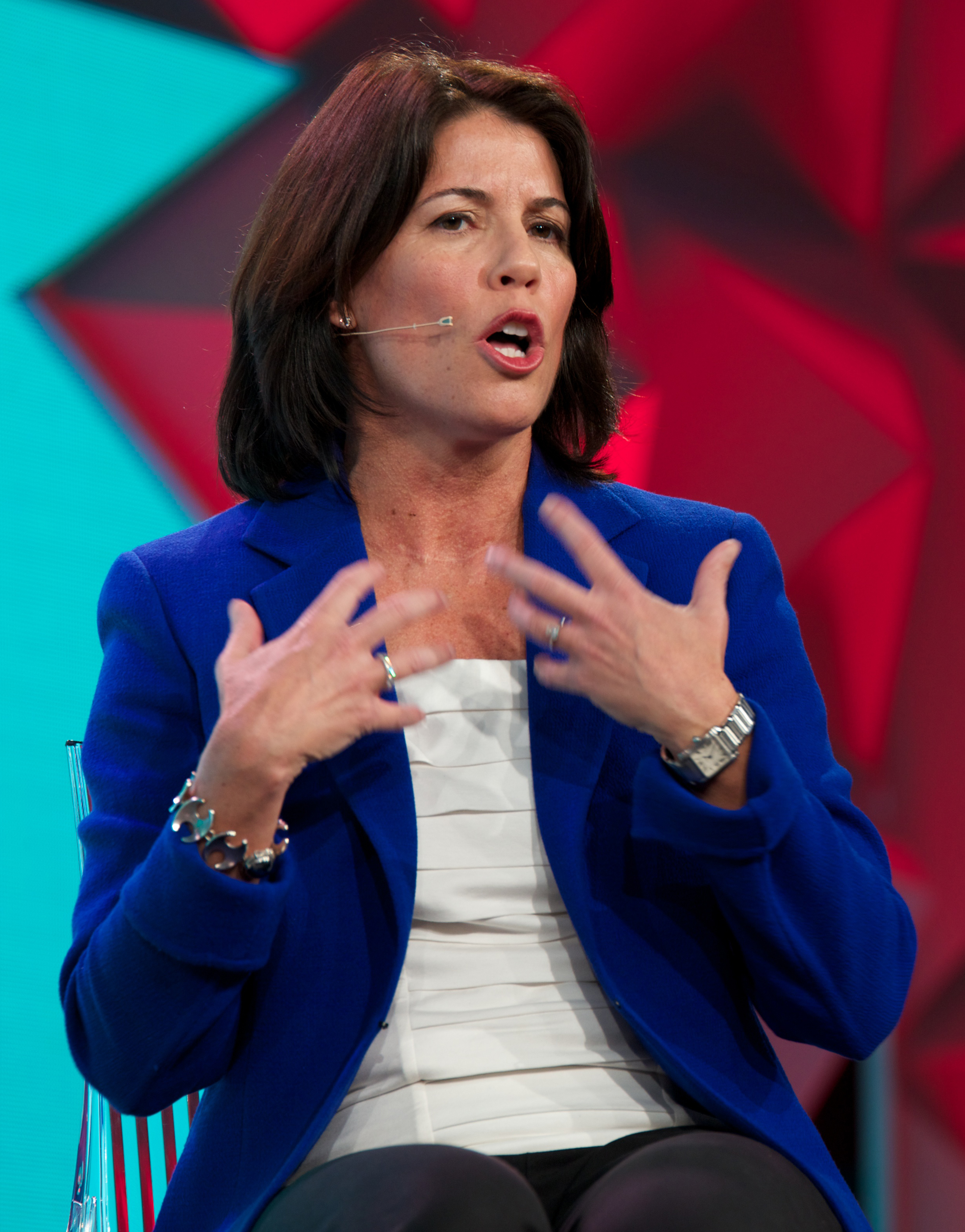
- Foulkes in 2014

Governor-elect of Rhode Island
- Assuming office January 4, 2027
- Lieutenant: Sabina Matos
- Succeeding: Dan McKee

Personal details
- Born: Helena Grace Buonanno; July 18, 1964 (age 62) Providence, Rhode Island, U.S.
- Party: Democratic
- Spouse: William Foulkes (m. 1989)
- Children: 4
- Relatives: Chris Dodd (uncle); Thomas J. Dodd Jr. (uncle); Thomas J. Dodd (grandfather)
- Education: Harvard University (BA, MBA)
- Website: Campaign website

Helena Grace Buonanno Foulkes (/həˈliːnə ˈfoʊks/; née Buonanno; born July 18, 1964) is an American businesswoman and politician who is the governor-elect of Rhode Island. She was the chief executive officer of Hudson's Bay Company and a marketing executive at CVS Pharmacy. A member of the Democratic Party, Foulkes unsuccessfully challenged incumbent Governor Dan McKee for the party's nomination for governor in 2022. She defeated Governor McKee for the nomination in 2026. She was elected governor on November 3, 2026.

== Early life and education ==
Buonanno was born in Providence, Rhode Island, on July 18, 1964. She is the eldest of five children of Bernard and Martha Buonanno (née Dodd). She is the maternal granddaughter of Connecticut senator Thomas J. Dodd and the niece of Connecticut senator and 2008 presidential candidate Chris Dodd. She was born to an Italian and Irish Catholic family.

Buonanno was raised in Rhode Island and attended Lincoln School in Providence. She earned her Bachelor of Arts from Harvard College, graduating magna cum laude in 1986. While at Harvard, Buonanno's senior thesis was advised by Larry Summers. She later earned her Master of Business Administration from Harvard Business School.

== Business career ==
After graduating from Harvard, Foulkes briefly worked at Goldman Sachs and Tiffany & Co before leaving to earn her MBA. She began working at CVS in 1992. She rose to become the company's executive vice president and chief marketing officer. She oversaw the launch of the ExtraCare card, a membership program offering savings to participants. Foulkes also created the Pharmacy Advisor program, its purpose being to offer advice to customers with chronic conditions, either in stores or over the phone.

In 2011, CVS made Foulkes its chief health care strategy and marketing officer, a new position created for her. In July 2015, Fortune magazine reported that as part of her role, Foulkes oversaw 9,600 retail stores and 18 distribution centers. She helped spur the decision to stop selling cigarettes and tobacco products, citing the need for CVS to better position itself as a healthcare company. She oversaw the company's philanthropic endeavors, and developed digital strategies to help consumers learn how to fulfill their pharmaceutical needs.

In 2015, Fortune magazine included her on its list of Most Powerful Women, citing Foulkes' role in the "$1.9 billion purchase of Target's prescription-filling business—a deal that will give CVS the most pharmacy locations in the U.S.—and launching upgraded beauty and healthy food sections in many of the stores".

On February 5, 2018, Hudson's Bay Co., owner of Saks Fifth Avenue, named Foulkes its new CEO, saying it would be effective on February 19. In her first six weeks as CEO, Foulkes was challenged with refashioning the company's business strategies given the industry's declining sales at the time.

In March 2020, Foulkes announced that she was leaving Hudson's Bay Co. following a deal reached with shareholders to go private.

Foulkes has been on the board of Costco since August 2023.

== Political career ==
On October 13, 2021, Foulkes announced her candidacy for governor of Rhode Island in the 2022 election. WPRI reported that "she would seek to spur job growth, reduce regulations, deal with the effects of climate change, and improve public education." She faced incumbent Governor Dan McKee, former Secretary of State Matt Brown, and incumbent Secretary of State Nellie Gorbea in the Democratic primary. She finished second, losing the primary to McKee by just under 3,900 votes.

On September 9, 2025, Foulkes announced her candidacy for governor of Rhode Island in the 2026 election. She again faced Governor McKee in the Democratic primary, defeating him in a landslide. She won every municipality in the state, and became the first person to unseat an elected incumbent governor since 2014.

In the 2026 gubernatorial campaign, Foulkes promised to use the state’s millionaire's tax to fund new housing developments, an audit of increased energy bills, and to hold the RI Department of Transportation accountable for delays on construction of the Washington Bridge, She has also promised to raise Medicaid reimbursement rates, and create an employer-matched childcare fund. Foulkes received endorsements from, among others, Speaker Emeritus Nancy Pelosi, the RI Association of Democratic City and Town Chairs, the Rhode Island SIEU State Council, and Climate Action Rhode Island. She was elected governor on November 3, 2026.

== Personal life ==
Through her mother Martha, Foulkes is a member of the Dodd family. Her grandfather Thomas J. Dodd was a prosecutor during the Nuremberg Trials and later a senator from Connecticut, her uncle Chris Dodd was a former U.S. senator and the partial namesake of the Dodd-Frank Act, while her uncle Thomas was a U.S. ambassador under the Clinton administration.

Foulkes married William Foulkes in 1989. The two met while students at Harvard and have four children together.

From 2016 to 2022, Foulkes served on the Harvard Board of Overseers, the university's second-highest governing body. She was the board's president from 2021 to 2022.

== Electoral history ==
2022 Rhode Island Democratic gubernatorial primary election
Party	Candidate	Votes	%
Democratic	Dan McKee (incumbent)	37,288	32.8
Democratic	Helena Foulkes	33,391	29.9
Democratic	Nellie Gorbea	29,811	26.2
Democratic	Matthew Brown	9,021	7.9
Democratic	Luis Daniel Munoz	3,547	3.1
Total votes		113,058	100.00

2026 Rhode Island gubernatorial election
Primary election
Party	Candidate	Votes	%
Democratic	Helena Foulkes	79,770	62.4
Democratic	Dan McKee (incumbent)	47,983	37.6
Total votes		127,753	100.0
General election
Democratic	Helena Foulkes		
Republican	Aaron C. Guckian		
Independent	Ken Block		
Independent	Jasjit S. Gotra		
Independent	C.D. Reynolds		
Write-in			
Total votes			100.0

== See also ==
- List of female governors in the United States

Party political offices
Preceded by Dan McKee	Democratic nominee for Governor of Rhode Island; 2026	Most recent
Political offices
Preceded by Dan McKee	Governor of Rhode Island; Taking office 2027	Elect
