= Joshua Miller (Rhode Island politician) =

Rhode Island politician (born 1954)

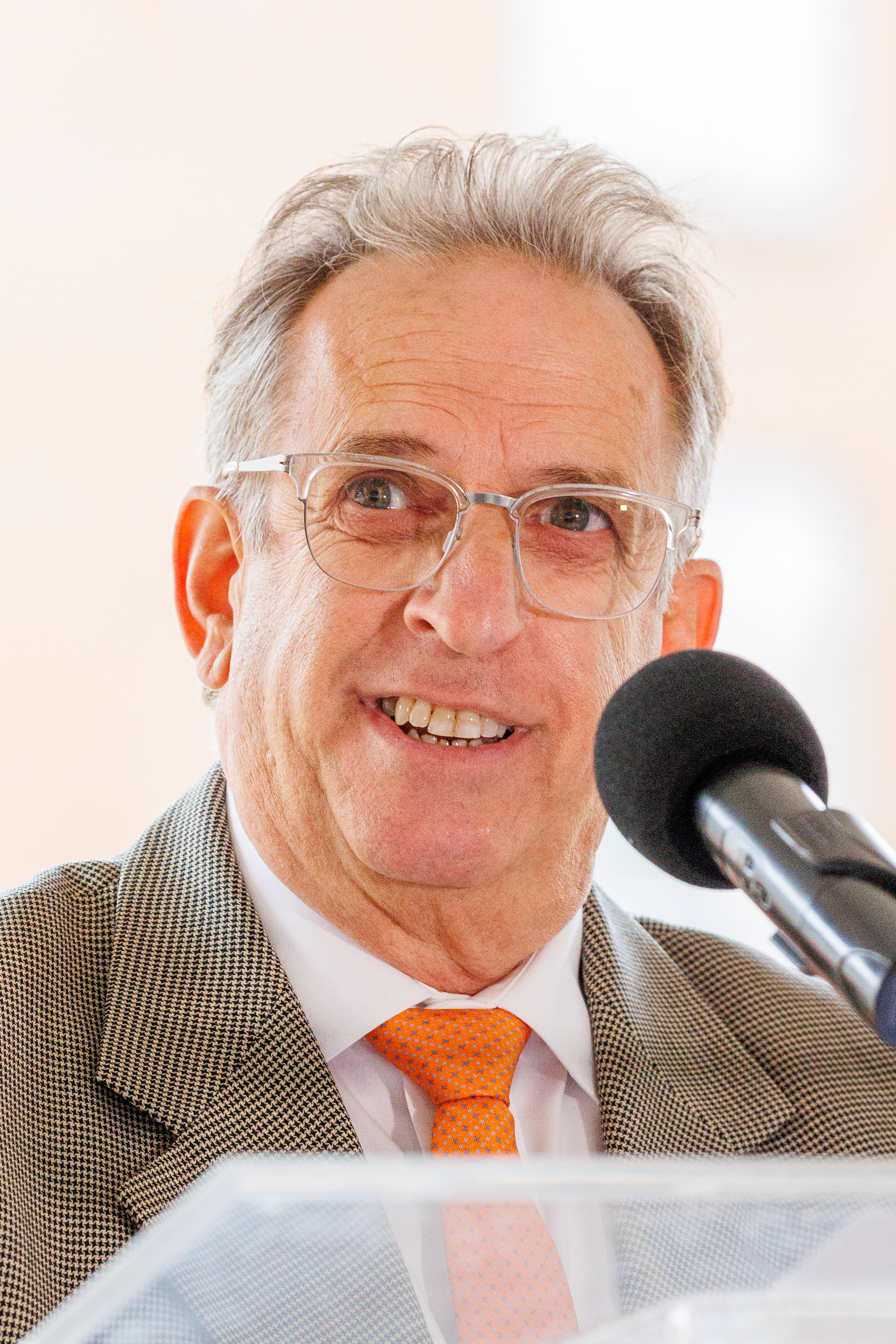

Member of the Rhode Island Senate from the 28th district
- In office January 2007 – January 7, 2025
- Preceded by: Elizabeth H. Roberts
- Succeeded by: Lammis Vargas

Personal details
- Born: April 17, 1954 (age 72) Providence, Rhode Island, U.S.
- Party: Democratic
- Education: University of Rhode Island
- Profession: State senator
- Website: joshuamiller.org

Joshua Miller (born April 17, 1954) is an American politician who served as a Democratic member of the Rhode Island Senate representing Cranston District 28 from January 2007 to January 2025.

== Early life ==
Miller graduated from Hope High School and attended the University of Rhode Island. Miller is Jewish.

== Political career ==
=== Early elections ===
When District 28 Democratic Senator Elizabeth H. Roberts ran for Lieutenant Governor of Rhode Island, Miller ran in the four-way September 12, 2006 Democratic Primary, winning with 173 votes (53.9%), and won the November 7, 2006 General election, winning with 7,744 votes (77.1%) against Republican nominee Ivan Marte. Miller was unopposed for the September 9, 2008 Democratic Primary, winning with 667 votes, and won the November 4, 2008 General election with 7,366 votes (64.9%) against Republican nominee Robert Clarkin, who had run a House seat in 2002 and 2004.

Miller was unopposed for the September 23, 2010 Democratic Primary, winning with 1,770 votes, and won the November 2, 2010 General election with 4,843 votes (56.5%) against Republican nominee Donald Normandin and Independent candidate Delores Issler. Miller and returning 2008 Republican challenger Robert Clarkin were both unopposed their September 11, 2012 primaries, setting up a rematch; Miller won the November 6, 2012 General election with 7,119 votes (69.0%) against Clarkin.

=== Legislation ===
In 2014, Miller served as the Rhode Island Senate Health and Human Services Committee chairman. That year, he and Edith Ajello held a press conference to announce that they would introduce a bill to legalize, tax, and regulate marijuana similarly to alcohol. As of May 2017, he and Scott A. Slater were the primary sponsors of legislation to legalize marijuana.

== Controversies ==
In March 2014, Dan Bidondi of "Truthradio.com," a gun-rights activist and writer for the website Infowars, approached Miller with a microphone and camera in the Rhode Island State House rotunda during a hearing on gun legislation. Bidondi had previously gained attention for showing up at news conferences on the Boston Marathon bombing to yell out questions about whether the attack was a "false flag" operation. In the ensuing confrontation, Miller told Bidondi to "go fuck yourself." In a statement the following day, Miller apologized, stating that "regardless of the emotions and atmosphere of the moment, it does not justify the language I used that day. Out of respect for the decorum of the State House and the constituents I represent, I offer my apologies."

On June 22, 2023, Miller was arrested by Cranston police for malicious damage to an SUV displaying a "Biden sucks" bumper sticker, by keying the owner's car, and obstruction of a police officer. Miller apologized for his language at the time and entered a plea of no contest to the misdemeanor charges. He was ordered to pay restitution to the victim, donate to the local food bank, and pay legal fees; upon satisfactorily finishing probation, after one year his offense would be expunged. Rhode Island Senate President Dominick J. Ruggerio declined to censure or punish Miller further after the court proceedings concluded.

== Business ==
Miller owns several Providence restaurants.
