= Steven D'Hondt =

American geomicrobiologist

Steven D’Hondt is an American geomicrobiologist who studies microbial communities living beneath the seafloor. He is a professor of oceanography at the University of Rhode Island.

== Career ==
D’Hondt earned his BS in Geology at Stanford University in 1984 and his PhD in Geological and Geophysical Sciences at Princeton University in 1990. He became an assistant professor in the Graduate School of Oceanography at the University of Rhode Island in 1989, where he remains today.

D’Hondt’s research program investigates the interplay between the biosphere and the physical world. In a 2009 study, his group examined sediments from below the South Pacific Gyre, an area of ocean between Australia and South America where little organic matter falls to the seafloor. They discovered very low numbers of microbial cells and the presence of oxygen several meters down. Sediments with greater numbers of microbes lack oxygen at these depths. In a 2015 study, D’Hondt led a research group that demonstrated that oxygen penetrates the entire sediment column in as much as one third of the world’s oceans. This oxygen affects microbial metabolism in these sediments and may be transported into the underlying mantle. In 2021, his group published evidence that splitting of water by natural radiation is the principal energy source for microbial communities in marine sediment older than a few million years.

D’Hondt led the Subsurface Biospheres team of the NASA Astrobiology Institute from 2001 to 2006. He was an Executive Committee member of the Center for Dark Energy Biosphere Investigations from 2010 to 2022. He has long been involved with the international scientific drilling community. He was co-chief scientist of Ocean Drilling Program Leg 201 and Integrated Ocean Drilling Program Expedition 329, the first and second ocean drilling expeditions to focus primarily on life beneath the seafloor. D’Hondt is a member of the American Geophysical Union, the American Society for Microbiology, and the Geochemical Society.

== Honors ==
In 2022, D’Hondt was made a Fellow of the Canadian Institute for Advanced Research and a Fellow of the American Association for the Advancement of Science.

In 2025, D'Hondt was made a Fellow of the American Geophysical Union (AGU).

== Selected publications ==
D'Hondt has more than 100 peer-reviewed publications with over 13,500 citations and an h-index of 58. Among them are:

- Sauvage, Justine F.; Flinders, Ashton; Spivack, Arthur J.; Pockalny, Robert; Dunlea, Ann G.; Anderson, Chloe H.; Smith, David C.; Murray, Richard W.; D’Hondt, Steven (2021-02-26). "The contribution of water radiolysis to marine sedimentary life". Nature Communications. 12 (1): 1297. doi:10.1038/s41467-021-21218-z. ISSN 2041-1723
- D’Hondt, Steven; Inagaki, Fumio; Zarikian, Carlos Alvarez; Abrams, Lewis J.; Dubois, Nathalie; Engelhardt, Tim; Evans, Helen; Ferdelman, Timothy; Gribsholt, Britta; Harris, Robert N.; Hoppie, Bryce W.; Hyun, Jung-Ho; Kallmeyer, Jens; Kim, Jinwook; Lynch, Jill E. (2015-04). "Presence of oxygen and aerobic communities from sea floor to basement in deep-sea sediments". Nature Geoscience. 8 (4): 299–304. doi:10.1038/ngeo2387. ISSN 1752-0894.
- Kallmeyer, Jens; Pockalny, Robert; Adhikari, Rishi Ram; Smith, David C.; D’Hondt, Steven (2012-10-02). "Global distribution of microbial abundance and biomass in subseafloor sediment". Proceedings of the National Academy of Sciences. 109 (40): 16213–16216. doi:10.1073/pnas.1203849109. ISSN 0027-8424. PMC 3479597. PMID 22927371.
- D'Hondt, Steven; Jørgensen, Bo Barker; Miller, D. Jay; Batzke, Anja; Blake, Ruth; Cragg, Barry A.; Cypionka, Heribert; Dickens, Gerald R.; Ferdelman, Timothy; Hinrichs, Kai-Uwe; Holm, Nils G.; Mitterer, Richard; Spivack, Arthur; Wang, Guizhi; Bekins, Barbara (2004-12-24). "Distributions of Microbial Activities in Deep Subseafloor Sediments". Science. 306 (5705): 2216–2221. doi:10.1126/science.1101155. ISSN 0036-8075.
- D'Hondt, Steven; Rutherford, Scott; Spivack, Arthur J. (15 March 2002). "Metabolic Activity of Subsurface Life in Deep-Sea Sediments". Science. 295 (5562): 2067–2070. Bibcode:2002Sci...295.2067D. doi:10.1126/science.1064878. PMID 11896277. S2CID 26979705.
- Rutherford, Scott; D'Hondt, Steven; Prell, Warren (19 August 1999). "Environmental controls on the geographic distribution of zooplankton diversity". Nature. 400 (6746): 749–753. Bibcode:1999Natur.400..749R. doi:10.1038/23449. PMID. S2CID 4418045.
- D'Hondt, S.; Donaghay, Percy; Zachos, James C.; Luttenberg, Danielle; Lindinger, Matthias (9 October 1998). "Organic Carbon Fluxes and Ecological Recovery from the Cretaceous-Tertiary Mass Extinction". Science. 282 (5387): 276–279. Bibcode:1998Sci...282..276D. doi:10.1126/science.282.5387.276. PMID 9765149.

== See also ==
- Deep biosphere
