= Nellie Gorbea =

Secretary of State of Rhode Island

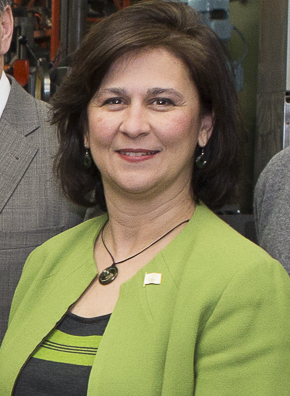
- Gorbea in 2015

Secretary of State of Rhode Island
- In office January 6, 2015 – January 3, 2023
- Governor: Gina Raimondo; Dan McKee
- Preceded by: Ralph Mollis
- Succeeded by: Gregg Amore

Personal details
- Born: July 12, 1967 (age 58) San Juan, Puerto Rico
- Party: Democratic
- Spouse: Steven D'Hondt (m. 1992; div. 2023)
- Children: 3
- Education: Princeton University (BA); Columbia University (MPA)

Nellie M. Gorbea (born July 12, 1967) is an American politician. A member of the Democratic Party, she had served as the Secretary of State of Rhode Island from 2015 to 2023.

== Early life and education ==
Gorbea was born and raised in Puerto Rico. She earned a bachelor's degree from Princeton University's School of International and Public Affairs and a master's degree in public administration from Columbia University's School of International and Public Affairs. She moved to Rhode Island in the mid-1990s.

== Career ==
Gorbea was Deputy Secretary of State under Secretary of State Matt Brown from 2002 through 2006. She worked for Fleet Securities, was the program officer for economic and community development for the Rhode Island Foundation, and founded the Rhode Island Latino Civic Fund. Before resigning in July 2013 to run for election as secretary of state, she was executive director of Housing Works Rhode Island for five and a half years.

Incumbent Secretary of State Ralph Mollis was ineligible to run for reelection in the 2014 elections because of term limits. Gorbea campaigned for the position on a platform of making elections fair, fast and accurate, ensuring that Rhode Island businesses can easily start and thrive, bringing transparency to government, and increasing civic engagement. She defeated Guillaume de Ramel in the Democratic primary and Republican nominee John Carlevale in the general election. She was sworn in as secretary of state on January 6, 2015, becoming the first Hispanic to hold statewide office in Rhode Island.

In 2016, Gorbea ushered in legislation to allow for stiffer penalties for violations of lobbying rules.

In 2017, Gorbea worked to pass automatic voter registration; the bill, which automatically registers Rhode Islanders when they interact with the state Department of Motor Vehicles, was signed into law by Governor Gina Raimondo, making Rhode Island the ninth state in the United States to do so.

In 2018, Gorbea worked to modernize Rhode Island's notary-public laws to allow for electronic notarizations for the first time in Rhode Island. In November of that year, Gorbea was re-elected to a second term with over 67% of the vote.

On May 24, 2021, Gorbea announced that she was running for the Democratic nomination for governor of Rhode Island in the 2022 election. She lost the Democratic Party primary election to the incumbent, Dan McKee.

== Personal life ==
Gorbea lives in North Kingstown. She has three daughters, and was married to Steven D'Hondt.

== Electoral history ==
Rhode Island Secretary of State Democratic primary election, 2014
Party	Candidate	Votes	%
Democratic	Nellie Gorbea	58,444	51.4
Democratic	Guillaume De Ramel	55,237	48.6

Rhode Island Secretary of State Election, 2014
Party	Candidate	Votes	%
Democratic	Nellie Gorbea	186,899	60.5
Republican	John Carlevale Sr.	121,466	39.3
Write-ins	Write-ins	770	0.2

Rhode Island Secretary of State Democratic primary election, 2018
Party	Candidate	Votes	%
Democratic	Nellie Gorbea	95,103	100.0

Rhode Island Secretary of State Election, 2018
Party	Candidate	Votes	%
Democratic	Nellie Gorbea	247,276	67.4
Republican	Pat Cortellessa	119,293	32.5
Write-ins	Write-ins	540	0.1

Rhode Island Governor Democratic primary election, 2022
Party	Candidate	Votes	%
Democratic	Dan McKee	37,288	32.8
Democratic	Helena Foulkes	33,931	29.9
Democratic	Nellie Gorbea	29,811	26.2
Democratic	Matt Brown	9,021	7.9
Democratic	Luis Daniel Muñoz	3,547	3.1

Party political offices
Preceded by Ralph Mollis	Democratic nominee for Secretary of State of Rhode Island; 2014, 2018	Succeeded by Gregg Amore
Political offices
Preceded by Ralph Mollis	Secretary of State of Rhode Island; 2015–2023	Succeeded by Gregg Amore
