= Elizabeth H. Roberts =

American politician

Elizabeth Roberts
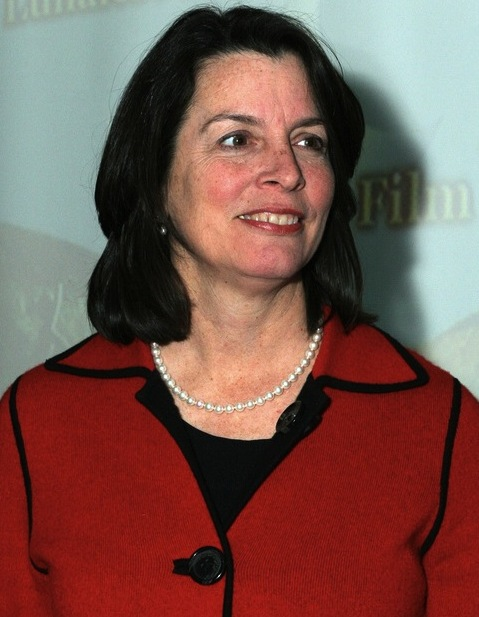

Secretary of Health and Human Services of Rhode Island
- In office January 6, 2015 – February 14, 2017
- Governor: Gina Raimondo
- Preceded by: Steven M. Costantino
- Succeeded by: Eric Beane

68th Lieutenant Governor of Rhode Island
- In office January 2, 2007 – January 6, 2015
- Governor: Donald Carcieri; Lincoln Chafee
- Preceded by: Charles Fogarty
- Succeeded by: Dan McKee

Member of the Rhode Island Senate from the 28th district
- In office January 7, 2003 – January 2, 2007
- Preceded by: Joe Polisena
- Succeeded by: Joshua Miller

Member of the Rhode Island Senate from the 11th district
- In office January 7, 1997 – January 7, 2003
- Preceded by: William P. Fitzpatrick
- Succeeded by: Mary A. Parella

Personal details
- Born: April 17, 1957 (age 69) Washington, D.C., U.S.
- Party: Democratic
- Children: Kathleen; Mark
- Education: Brown University (BA); Boston University (MBA)

Elizabeth H. Roberts (born April 17, 1957) is an American politician who served as the 68th lieutenant governor of Rhode Island from 2007 to 2015. A member of the Democratic Party, she served in that position during the administrations of Republican governor Donald Carcieri and Independent-turned Democrat Lincoln Chafee. She was elected in 2006, becoming the state's first female lieutenant governor and was succeeded by Daniel McKee on January 6, 2015. She later served as Secretary of Health and Human Services during the administration of Governor Gina Raimondo, but subsequently resigned due to a widely criticized statewide computer system rollout.

== Personal life ==
Roberts graduated from Brown University in 1978 and earned an MBA in Health Care Management from Boston University in 1984. Prior to entering politics, Roberts has worked as a business strategy consultant, policy analyst, and health care manager. She resides in Providence, Rhode Island.

== Early political career ==
=== Rhode Island State Senate ===
Roberts served five two-year terms in the Rhode Island Senate from 1996 until 2006. During her tenure in the state Senate, she was an activist for health and medical issues. Roberts also focused on economic development and job growth, and pushed for cleaner air and water, stronger schools, and increased attention to disaster preparedness.

During her tenure in the state Senate she served as the Chairwoman of the Senate Health and Human Services Committee. Later, she served as a co-chair of Permanent Joint Committee on Healthcare Oversight, which she used as a vehicle to push for reform for Blue Cross and Blue Shield, the largest provider of health insurance in Rhode Island.

Roberts also helped expand the state's prescription drug program for seniors (RIPAE) and helped expand coverage to more families through Rite Care, the state's public health system. The reform organization Common Cause named Roberts one of the top two senators in Rhode Island in 2006, giving her the second highest rating in the General Assembly at 91% and an “A” for her reform efforts during the legislative session.

== Lieutenant governor ==
Roberts was elected the state's first female lieutenant governor on November 7, 2006. She was inaugurated as the 68th lieutenant governor of Rhode Island on January 2, 2007. She toyed with the idea of running for governor in the 2010 election, but instead decided to run for re-election as lieutenant governor.

== Secretary of Health and Human Services ==
After the 2014 election in which Roberts did not stand for election, Governor-elect Gina Raimondo announced Roberts as her nominee for the office of Secretary of the Executive Office of Health and Human Services.

=== Computer system failure and resignation ===
In February 2017, Roberts resigned from her post in the Raimondo administration. She left the cabinet-level post for a variety of reasons, but the roll-out of the botched Unified Health Infrastructure Project (a new statewide computer network) overshadowed her tenure. The disastrous UHIP computer network launch in September 2016 saw scores of people without access government to programs such as food stamps and child care due to glitches in the software, designed by Deloitte. This crash created a backlog of over 20,000 cases.

== See also ==
- List of female lieutenant governors in the United States

Rhode Island Senate
| Preceded by William P. Fitzpatrick | Member of the Rhode Island Senate from the 11th district 1997–2003 | Succeeded by Mary A. Parella |
| Preceded by Joe Polisena | Member of the Rhode Island Senate from the 28th district 2003–2007 | Succeeded by Joshua Miller |
Political offices
| Preceded by Charles J. Fogarty | Lieutenant Governor of Rhode Island; 2007–2015 | Succeeded by Dan McKee |
