= William P. Fitzpatrick =

Irish-born retired American politician

Will Fitzpatrick

Member of the Rhode Island Senate from the 11th district
- In office January 1993 – January 1997
- Preceded by: David H. Sholes
- Succeeded by: Elizabeth H. Roberts

Personal details
- Born: William P Fitzpatrick; 1961 (age 64–65) Ireland
- Party: Democratic

William P "Will" Fitzpatrick (born 1961) is an Irish-born retired American politician. A Democrat, he served from 1993-97 in the Rhode Island Senate.

Born and raised in Ireland, he was educated by the Roman Catholic Patrician Brothers before emigrating to the United States. A computer programmer by trade, Fitzpatrick ran for the Rhode Island Senate from the 11th district in 1992, comprising parts of Cranston. He defeated seven-term incumbent David H. Sholes in the Democratic primary election held on September 15, 1992 and went on to win the general election. A resident of Edgewood, he served two terms, holding office from January 1993 until January 1997. He was not a candidate for re-election to a third term in November 1996 and was succeeded by Elizabeth H. Roberts, who went on to be elected Lieutenant Governor.

== Sexual orientation ==
A gay man, Fitzpatrick confirmed his sexual orientation to the media weeks after his election in November 1992. He was the first ever openly gay member of the Rhode Island Legislature.

== Personal life ==
Fitzpatrick resides in California.
