= Peter Kilmartin =

American politician

73rd Attorney General of Rhode Island
- In office January 4, 2011 – January 1, 2019
- Governor: Lincoln Chafee; Gina Raimondo
- Preceded by: Patrick Lynch
- Succeeded by: Peter Neronha

Member of the Rhode Island House of Representatives from the 61st district
- In office January 7, 2003 – January 3, 2011
- Preceded by: Robert B. Lowe
- Succeeded by: Raymond Johnston

Member of the Rhode Island House of Representatives from the 80th district
- In office January 1991 – January 7, 2003
- Preceded by: Joseph R. LaMountain
- Succeeded by: Constituency abolished

Personal details
- Born: February 18, 1962 (age 64) Pawtucket, Rhode Island, U.S.
- Party: Democratic
- Spouse: Kristine Kilmartin
- Education: Roger Williams University (BS, JD)
- Website: Campaign website

Peter F. Kilmartin (born 1962) was the 73rd Attorney General of Rhode Island. Kilmartin is also a retired police captain and a former member of the Rhode Island House of Representatives.

== Biography ==
Kilmartin was born February 18, 1962, in Rhode Island. Kilmartin attended William E. Tolman High School in Pawtucket and graduated in 1980. Kilmartin was sworn in as a police officer with the Pawtucket Police Department in June 1984 while continuing his studies at Roger Williams University, where he earned his Bachelor of Science in 1988. He later returned to school, and earned his Juris Doctor in 1998 from Roger Williams University School of Law. Kilmartin eventually rose through the ranks of the Pawtucket Police Department, ultimately attaining the rank of captain of the department's prosecution division. He retired from the police department in 2008, after 24 years of service.

== Politics and public service ==
Peter Kilmartin was first elected as a state representative on November 6, 1990, into the 80th district. Upon downsizing of the House of Representatives from 100 to 75 members in the 2002 election, Kilmartin ran unopposed and was elected to serve in the 61st district. Running unopposed, Kilmartin was most recently re-elected on 4 November 2008. He served as Majority Whip from 2005 to 2010, and during the 2009-2010 legislative session, Kilmartin served on the House Committee on Corporations, House Committee on Labor, House Committee on Rules, and the Joint Committee on Highway Safety .

Kilmartin announced he would not seek an eleventh term in the House of Representatives at the end of the 2010 session, and on February 23, 2010, he announced his intention to run for the office of Attorney General of Rhode Island. He was elected as Rhode Island's Attorney General on November 2, 2010.

== Electoral history ==
Rhode Island House of Representatives 80th District Election, 1990
| Party | Candidate | Votes | % |
| Democratic | Peter Kilmartin | 2,607 | 100.00 |

Rhode Island House of Representatives 80th District Election, 1992
| Party | Candidate | Votes | % |
| Democratic | Peter Kilmartin (inc.) | 3,134 | 79.79 |
| Independent | Richard Patnaude | 794 | 20.21 |

Rhode Island House of Representatives 80th District Election, 1994
| Party | Candidate | Votes | % |
| Democratic | Peter Kilmartin (inc.) | 2,688 | 100.00 |

Rhode Island House of Representatives 80th District Election, 1998
| Party | Candidate | Votes | % |
| Democratic | Peter Kilmartin (inc.) | 2,409 | 98.97 |
| Write-ins | Write-ins | 25 | 1.03 |

Rhode Island House of Representatives 80th District Election, 2000
| Party | Candidate | Votes | % |
| Democratic | Peter Kilmartin (inc.) | 3,066 | 100.00 |

Rhode Island House of Representatives 61st District Election, 2002
| Party | Candidate | Votes | % |
| Democratic | Peter Kilmartin (inc.) | 3,725 | 100.00 |

Rhode Island House of Representatives 61st District Election, 2004
| Party | Candidate | Votes | % |
| Democratic | Peter Kilmartin (inc.) | 4,642 | 98.77 |
| Write-ins | Write-ins | 58 | 1.23 |

Rhode Island House of Representatives 61st District Election, 2006
| Party | Candidate | Votes | % |
| Democratic | Peter Kilmartin (inc.) | 4,413 | 100.00 |

Rhode Island House of Representatives 61st District Election, 2008
| Party | Candidate | Votes | % |
| Democratic | Peter Kilmartin (inc.) | 4,737 | 100.00 |

Rhode Island Attorney General Democratic Primary Election, 2010
| Party | Candidate | Votes | % |
| Democratic | Peter Kilmartin | 38,253 | 39.9 |
| Democratic | Stephen Archambault | 31,940 | 33.3 |
| Democratic | Joseph Fernandez | 25,649 | 26.8 |

Rhode Island Attorney General Election, 2010
| Party | Candidate | Votes | % |
| Democratic | Peter Kilmartin | 141,969 | 43.1 |
| Republican | Erik Wallin | 95,541 | 29.0 |
| Moderate | Christopher Little | 47,328 | 14.4 |
| Independent | Keven McKenna | 31,721 | 9.6 |
| Independent | Robert Rainville | 13,045 | 4.0 |

Rhode Island Attorney General Election, 2014
| Party | Candidate | Votes | % |
| Democratic | Peter Kilmartin (inc.) | 177,981 | 56.9 |
| Republican | Dawson Tucker Hodgson | 134,444 | 43.0 |
| Write-ins | Write-ins | 580 | 0.2 |

== Notes ==
Party political offices
| Preceded by Patrick Lynch | Democratic nominee for Attorney General of Rhode Island; 2010, 2014 | Succeeded by Peter Neronha |
Rhode Island House of Representatives
| Preceded by Joseph R. LaMountain | Member of the Rhode Island House of Representatives from the 80th district 1991–2003 | Constituency abolished |
| Preceded by Robert B. Lowe | Member of the Rhode Island House of Representatives from the 61st district 2003–2011 | Succeeded by Raymond Johnston |
| Preceded by Rene R. Menard | Majority Whip of the Rhode Island House of Representatives; 2005–2010 | Succeeded by J. Patrick O'Neill |
Legal offices
| Preceded by Patrick Lynch | Attorney General of Rhode Island; 2011–2019 | Succeeded by Peter Neronha |
