= Cale Keable =

Member of the Rhode Island House of Representatives

Member of the Rhode Island House of Representatives from the 47th district
- In office January 2011 – December 31, 2018
- Preceded by: Edwin R. Pacheco
- Succeeded by: David J. Place

Personal details
- Born: July 10, 1976 (age 50)
- Party: Democratic
- Education: Providence College; Harvard Law School
- Profession: Attorney

Cale P. Keable (born July 10, 1976) is an American politician and a Democratic member of the Rhode Island House of Representatives representing District 47 since January 2011. He is married to Colleen Murphy Keable (née) Foley of Medford, MA

== Education ==
Keable earned his BA degree at Providence College and his JD at Harvard Law School.

== Sexual harassment accusation ==
State Rep. Katherine Kazarian accused Keable of sexual harassment in 2018. Keable denied the allegations. Keable was subsequently temporarily removed as chairman of the powerful House Judiciary Committee.

== Elections ==
- 2018: Keable lost in the general election in 2018.
- 2012: Keable and returning 2010 Republican opponent Donald Fox were both unopposed for their September 11, 2012 primaries, setting up a rematch; Keable won the November 6, 2012 General election with 3,201 votes (54.3%) against Fox.
- 2010: When District 47 Democratic Representative Edwin R. Pacheco left the Legislature and left the seat open, Keable ran in the September 23, 2010 Democratic Primary, winning with 928 votes (63.3%) and won the November 2, 2010 General election with 2,435 votes (52.1%) against Republican nominee Donald Fox.
