= Patrick Lynch (Rhode Island attorney general) =

American lawyer (born 1965)

72nd Attorney General of Rhode Island
- In office January 7, 2003 – January 4, 2011
- Governor: Donald Carcieri
- Preceded by: Sheldon Whitehouse
- Succeeded by: Peter Kilmartin

Personal details
- Born: February 4, 1965 (age 61) Providence, Rhode Island, U.S.
- Party: Democratic
- Education: Brown University (BA); Queen's University, Belfast; Suffolk University (JD)

Patrick C. Lynch (born February 4, 1965, Providence, Rhode Island) is an American lawyer who served as Rhode Island's 72nd Attorney General. He oversaw the investigation and prosecution of the second-deadliest fire in Rhode Island history, the Station Nightclub Fire, and also sued former lead paint manufacturers for cleanup costs associated with their old products. He won reelection in 2006, and attempted unsuccessfully to run for governor of Rhode Island in 2010, where he dropped out before the Democratic Primary.

He has two children, Kelsey and Graham, with his first wife, and has since remarried.

His brother is William J. Lynch, former Chairman of the Democratic Party of Rhode Island.

== Early career ==
While attending St. Raphael Academy in Pawtucket, Rhode Island, Lynch played basketball and baseball. He went on to attend Brown University, where he was part of the School's first Ivy League Championship basketball team.

He graduated from Brown University with a B.S. in Economics and Political Science in 1987 and took graduate courses at Queen's University of Belfast while playing professional basketball in Northern Ireland and taking part in a program called Sports Corps, modeled after the Peace Corps.

After returning to the United States, Lynch earned a J.D. from Suffolk University Law School in 1992. He then worked for two years as a clerk for Presiding Superior Court Judge Joseph Rodgers Jr., and then joined the R.I. attorney general's office in 1994. Lynch was eventually named lead prosecutor of the state's Organized Crime Unit. In 1999, Lynch joined Rhode Island law firm Tillinghast Licht Perkins Smith & Cohen, where he worked until being elected attorney general.

== Political career ==
Lynch formally announced his candidacy in March 2002 after incumbent Sheldon Whitehouse announced he would run for governor. Lynch was a well connected member of the Democratic Party - his father was a former Mayor of Pawtucket, Rhode Island and his brother was serving as Chairman of the R.I. Democratic Party. Lynch faced J. William Harsch, a former director of the R.I. Department of Environmental Management, who ran as an independent but had the endorsement of the state Republican Party. Lynch won the election with 62 percent of the vote.

While in office, Lynch advocated for stricter laws regarding drunken-driving and the use of handguns. He has also proposed measures that would link school attendance rates and teenagers' driving privileges, increase penalties against people who provide alcohol to minors, and require school districts to put in place anti-bullying and school-safety plans. He has also called for community prosecution, and has paired state prosecutors with police personnel in Providence Police Department's neighborhood precincts with the goal of timely prosecution of drug crimes, robbery, and assault.

=== The Station Nightclub Fire ===
One of Lynch's first responsibilities as attorney general was to oversee the criminal investigation of the February 20, 2003, Station Nightclub Fire in West Warwick. With 100 deaths and many more injuries, the fire was the fourth-deadliest nightclub fire in U.S. history and the second-deadliest fire ever in Rhode Island, trailing only the USS Bennington fire that claimed 103 lives in the 1950s. The criminal investigation led to the sentencing of Daniel Biechele, the tour manager of the band whose pyrotechnics started the fire, and also resulted in no-contest pleas by the two co-owners of the nightclub. In October 2021, the CBS program 48 Hours interviewed Lynch about shortcomings in the investigation and his failure to prosecute certain potentially responsible parties.

=== Lead paint lawsuit ===
Lynch also pursued a lawsuit against lead paint manufactures that was initiated by Whitehouse, his predecessor. The initial lawsuit ended in a mistrial while Whitehouse was in office. Lynch won the jury trial in a second lawsuit against Sherwin Williams Co., NL Industries, and Millennium Holdings, LLC., all former lead paint manufacturers. Another company, Atlantic Richfield Co., was acquitted by the jury. The case was closely monitored by other states and municipalities interested in whether former lead paint manufacturers are liable for problems their products caused after they stopped manufacturing it. The verdict was ultimately overturned in a 4-0 decision by the Rhode Island Supreme Court in 2008.

DuPont Co. settled out of court in June 2005, agreeing to pay $12 million to the Children's Health Forum. The agency agreed to use the money for lead paint abatement efforts and education campaigns. Lynch has since been criticized for accepting $4,250 in contributions from DuPont lawyers and lobbyists, and his opponent in the 2006 elections filed a complaint with the Rhode Island Ethics Commission. Lynch has denied that the donations were related to the lawsuit, and a lawyer for DuPont who accounted (with his wife) for $2,500 of the donations called the complaint "rubbish."

Lynch has also been criticized for the arrangement his office made with the law firm Motley Rice, which prosecuted the case. The firm agreed to cover the costs of the case in return for 16 2/3 percent of whatever damages the company won. Critics have charged that this kind of relationship between law firm and government is improper because the law firms stand to benefit from a guilty verdict.

=== 2008 Presidential race: Endorsement of Barack Obama ===
Lynch was the second of the only two superdelegates in Rhode Island to publicly endorse Barack Obama in the 2008 Democratic presidential primary on February 9, 2008. The first being Congressman Patrick J. Kennedy on January 28, 2008. Ultimately, Barack Obama lost the Rhode Island Democratic primary on March 4, 2008, to Hillary Clinton.

=== Central Falls Corruption Controversy ===
In 2010, Lynch became embroiled in a controversial investigation into rampant fraud and corruption by Central Falls Mayor Charles D. Moreau, a close friend of Lynch's. Lynch recused himself from the investigation due to his relationship with Moreau and with Moreau's spokeswoman, Cynthia Stern, whom Lynch later married. Moreau was sentenced in Rhode Island federal court to 24 months in prison after pleading guilty to soliciting and accepting a bribe while Mayor of Central Falls.

=== Gubernatorial campaign ===
On May 22, 2009, Lynch announced his candidacy for Governor of Rhode Island in the 2010 gubernatorial election.

On August 6, 2009, Lynch was warned by the State Board of Elections that he needed to more carefully disclose his campaign spending. At issue was some $9,000 in petty cash transactions that were not properly documented. The State Board of Elections did not fine Lynch whose campaign filed corrected paperwork amidst being confronted with the issue. The complaint was filed by the Rhode Island Republican Party.

On July 15, 2010, Lynch announced his exit from the Governors race, and endorsed fellow Democrat Frank Caprio. In his statement, Lynch said: "I did not enter public service to become a footnote in history by injuring my party, resulting in the election of a governor who is not equipped to guide our wonderful State into the future it deserves."

=== Current Activities ===
Since leaving his post as attorney general, he has been accused of lobbying his former office several times on behalf of topics such as online gambling and Google Search engine practices via his firm the Patrick Lynch Group. Whilst he has never registered with the state as a lobbyist, he denies that his communications with the office of current Attorney General constitute lobbying.

Additionally, he is a member of a law and consulting firm, Patrick Lynch Law

=== Election history ===
2006 General Election

Candidate	Votes	%
Patrick C. Lynch (D)	217,324	59.51%
J. William W. Harsch (R)	147,489	40.49%
Patrick C. Lynch (D) reelected Attorney General.		

2002 General Election

Candidate	Votes	%
Patrick C. Lynch (D)	191,488	
J. William W. Harsch (R)	119,117	
Patrick C. Lynch (D) elected Attorney General.		

Party political offices
Preceded by Sheldon Whitehouse	Democratic nominee for Attorney General of Rhode Island; 2002, 2006	Succeeded by Peter Kilmartin
Legal offices
Preceded by Sheldon Whitehouse	Attorney General of Rhode Island; 2003–2011	Succeeded by Peter Kilmartin
