= J. Michael Lenihan =

American politician

J. Michael "Mike" Lenihan (August 30, 1943 – February 28, 2015) was an American politician.

From East Greenwich, Rhode Island, Lenihan received his bachelor's degree from Rhode Island College and his master's degree from Brown University. Lenihan served in the Rhode Island State Senate from 1990 to 2010 and was a Democrat. He died of cancer in East Greenwich, Rhode Island at the age of 71.

An excerpt of his East Greenwich News obituary read as follows, “As a strong and respected voice in the chamber, Senator Lenihan had served as chair of the Senate Finance Committee, chair of the Senate Committee on Government Oversight, vice chair of the Senate Committee on Rules, and was a member of the Senate Committee on Environment & Agriculture. ... Lenihan championed public access to online legislation, and legislation on separation of powers, open meetings, vendor disclosure, public access to public records, and improvements in the governance of quasi-public commissions, public officials accountability, state contracts with employee leasing companies, as well as issues affecting Narragansett Bay, to name just a few.”
