= Matt Brown (American politician) =

American activist and politician

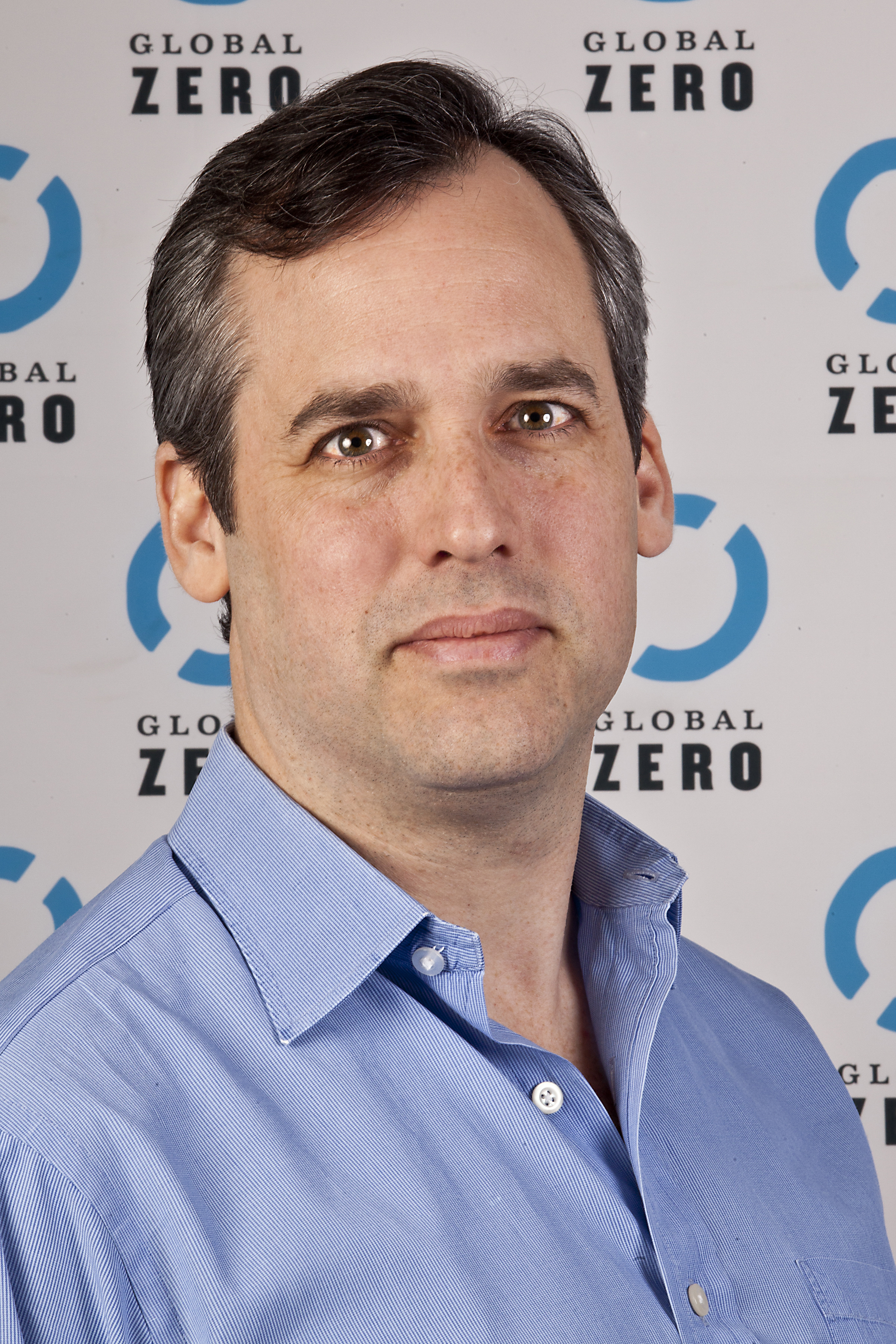
- Brown in 2011

Secretary of State of Rhode Island
- In office January 7, 2003 – January 1, 2007
- Governor: Donald Carcieri
- Preceded by: Edward Inman
- Succeeded by: Ralph Mollis

Personal details
- Born: November 15, 1969 (age 56) Bethesda, Maryland, U.S.
- Party: Democratic
- Children: 2
- Education: Columbia University (BA); Yale University (JD)

Matthew A. Brown (born November 15, 1969) is an American activist, and politician who served as secretary of state of Rhode Island from 2003 to 2007. Brown was a Democratic candidate for governor of Rhode Island in the 2018 election.

Alongside Bruce G. Blair, Brown co-founded Global Zero, a non-profit international initiative for the phased, verified elimination of all nuclear weapons worldwide. He previously served as executive director of the Rhode Island branch of City Year.

== Early life and education ==
Brown was born in Bethesda, Maryland, and raised in Providence, Rhode Island. He graduated from Moses Brown School in Providence and from Columbia University in 1993. He received his Juris Doctor from Yale Law School in 2001.

== Career ==
In 1993, Brown helped to start City Year in Rhode Island, the first expansion site of the model national service program that brings together diverse young adults ages 17–24 for a year of full-time community service and leadership development. From 1995-1998, Brown served as Executive Director of City Year Rhode Island.

=== Secretary of state of Rhode Island ===
At age 32, in his first campaign for public office, Brown defeated the incumbent Secretary of State in the Democratic primary, and went on to win the general election with 68.7% of the vote.

Brown served as secretary of State of Rhode Island from 2003 to 2007. He developed Rhode Island’s first Central Voter Registration System, a computerized voter registration system ensuring accurate voter lists and he launched Motor Voter e-Registration, a first-in-the-nation electronic voter registration system. He established new lobby regulations increasing public disclosure of the links between lobbyists and elected officials and created Lobbytracker, a web-based tool making lobbyist monthly financial reports available to the public online.

=== 2006 U.S. Senate campaign ===
In 2005, Brown declared his intention to run for the United States Senate in 2006, challenging incumbent Republican Senator Lincoln Chafee, but withdrew from the race and endorsed another Democratic candidate, Sheldon Whitehouse, who went on to win the general election.

=== Global Zero ===
Brown is Co-Founder, with Bruce G. Blair, of Global Zero, a non-profit international initiative for the elimination of all nuclear weapons worldwide. Since its launch in Paris in December 2008, Global Zero has grown to 300 leaders, including current and former heads of state, national security officials and military commanders, and 400,000 citizens worldwide; developed a practical step-by-step plan to eliminate nuclear weapons; launched an international student campaign with 75 campus chapters in eight countries; and produced an acclaimed documentary film, Countdown to Zero, in partnership with Lawrence Bender and Participant Media.

=== Gubernatorial candidacies ===
Brown declared his candidacy for the Democratic nomination for governor of Rhode Island in early-2018, challenging incumbent Democrat Gina Raimondo. Brown received the endorsement of several progressive organizations, including Justice Democrats, Bernie Sanders-affiliated organization Our Revolution, and the Progressive Democrats of America. Brown also received support from Senator Lincoln Chafee (whom Brown had once sought to challenge), former NARAL president Kate Michelman, and feminist activist Gloria Steinem. Brown lost the primary to Raimondo.

Brown ran for governor in the 2022 gubernatorial election. He lost in the Democratic primary on September 13, 2022.

Party political offices
Preceded by James Langevin	Democratic nominee for Secretary of State of Rhode Island; 2002	Succeeded by Ralph Mollis
Political offices
Preceded by Edward Inman	Secretary of State of Rhode Island; 2003–2007	Succeeded by Ralph Mollis
