= 2022 Rhode Island Senate election =

- November 8, 2022

All 38 seats in the Rhode Island Senate 20 seats needed for a majority

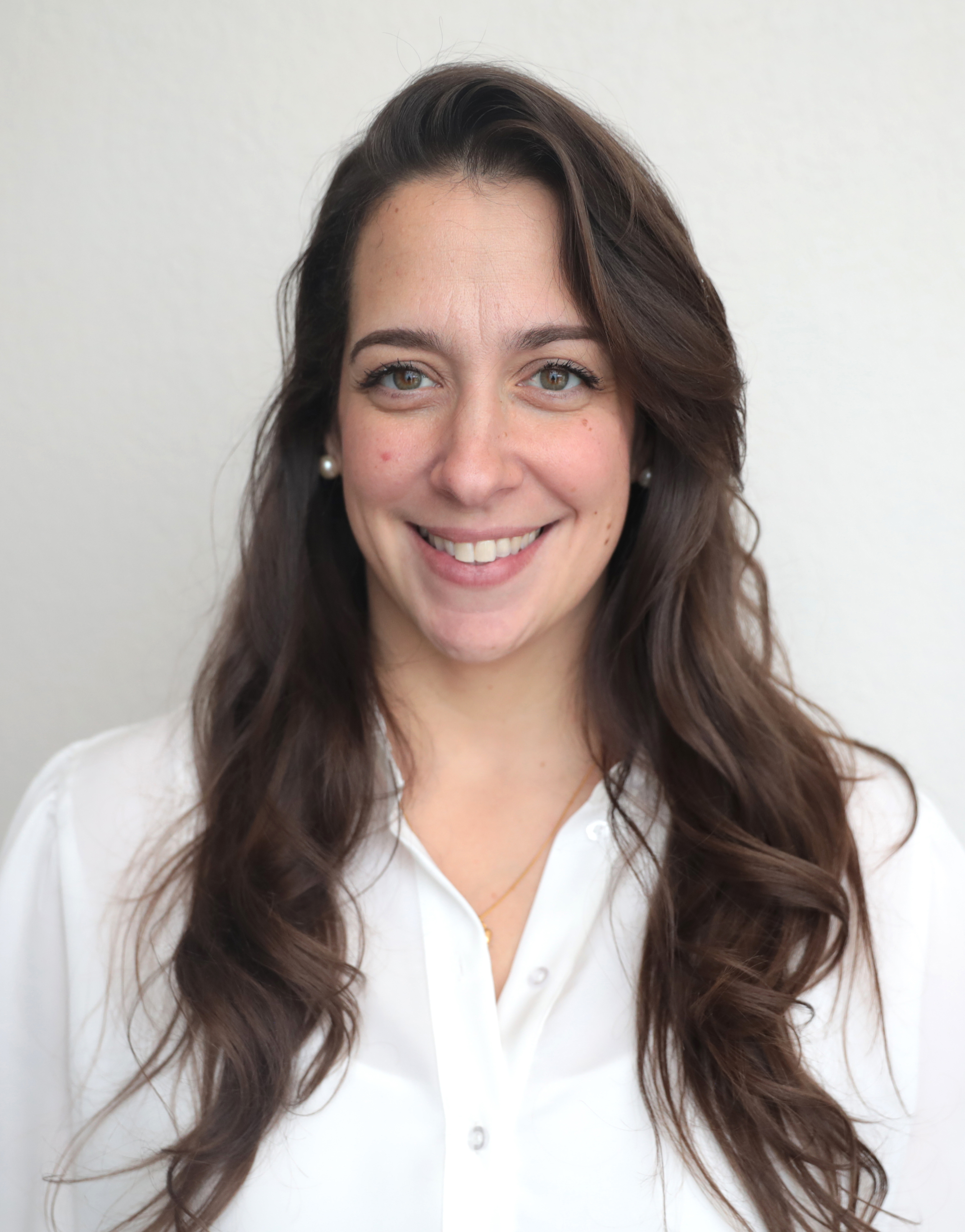
	Majority party	Minority party
Leader	Michael McCaffrey (retired)	Jessica de la Cruz
Party	Democratic	Republican
Leader since	March 23, 2017	August 2, 2022
Leader's seat	29th	23rd
Seats before	33	5
Seats after	33	5
Seat change	Steady	Steady
Popular vote	208,664	115,080
Percentage	62.44%	34.43%
- Results: Democratic hold Democratic gain Republican hold Republican gain
President before election
Dominick J. Ruggerio
Democratic
Elected President
Dominick J. Ruggerio
Democratic

The 2022 Rhode Island State Senate elections took place on November 8, 2022. Primary elections were held on September 13, 2022. Rhode Island voters elected state senators in all 38 seats of the Senate. State senators serve two-year terms in the Rhode Island Senate.

The election coincided with United States national elections and Rhode Island state elections, including U.S. House, Governor, and Rhode Island House. Since the previous election in 2020, Democrats held a 33-to-5-seat supermajority over Republicans. Democrats maintained the same supermajority in 2022, winning 33 seats.

These were the first elections in Rhode Island following the 2020 United States redistricting cycle, which resulted in redrawn legislative district boundaries.

== 2021 Special Election: District 3 ==
Special Election Sources:

Primary Election Results
Party	Candidate	Votes	%
Democratic Party Primary Results
Democratic	Samuel D. Zurier	1,304	31.37%
Democratic	Geena Pham	1,024	24.63%
Democratic	Bret M. Jacob	929	22.35%
Democratic	Hilary Levey Friedman	622	14.96%
Democratic	Ray Rickman	278	6.69%
Total votes		4,157	100.00%

General Election Results
Party	Candidate	Votes	%
Democratic	Samuel D. Zurier	2,647	90.90%
Republican	Alex W. Cannon	265	9.10%
Total votes		2,912	100.00%
Democratic hold			

== Predictions ==
Source	Ranking	As of
Sabato's Crystal Ball	Safe D	May 19, 2022

== Retirements ==
- District 11: James Seveney (D) was succeeded by Linda Ujifusa (D).
- District 18: Cynthia Mendes (D) was succeeded by Robert Britto (D).
- District 22: Stephen Archambault (D) was succeeded by David Tikoian (D).
- District 29: Michael McCaffrey (D) was succeeded by Anthony DeLuca II (R). (Republican gain)
- District 31: Kendra Anderson (D) was succeeded by Matthew LaMountain (D).
- District 32: Cynthia Armour Coyne (D) was succeeded by Pamela J. Lauria (D).
- District 38: Dennis Algiere (R) was succeeded by Victoria Gu (D). (Democratic gain)

== Incumbents defeated ==
=== Defeated in primary election ===
- District 30: Jeanine Calkin (D) was defeated by Mark McKenney (D).

== Summary of results by State Senate district ==
Italics denote an open seat held by the incumbent party; bold text denotes a gain for a party.

Senate district	Incumbent	Party	Elected Senator	Party
1	Maryellen Goodwin	Dem	Maryellen Goodwin	Dem
2	Ana Quezada	Dem	Ana Quezada	Dem
3	Sam Zurier (Note: Democratic Party Senator Gayle Goldin announced on August 17, 2021 that she was resigning from the state Senate to accept a position in President Joe Biden's administration. Sam Zurier won the Democratic Primary on October 5, 2021. Since only one Republican candidate filed for the special election, Alex W. Cannon advanced as the Republican nominee without a primary. Zurier won the election on November 2, 2021 and held the seat for his party. He assumed office on November 16, 2021.)	Dem	Sam Zurier	Dem
4	Dominick J. Ruggerio	Dem	Dominick J. Ruggerio	Dem
5	Sam Bell	Dem	Sam Bell	Dem
6	Tiara Mack	Dem	Tiara Mack	Dem
7	Frank Ciccone	Dem	Frank Ciccone	Dem
8	Sandra Cano	Dem	Sandra Cano	Dem
9	John Burke	Dem	John Burke	Dem
10	Walter Felag	Dem	Walter Felag	Dem
11	James Seveney	Dem	Linda Ujifusa	Dem
12	Louis DiPalma	Dem	Louis DiPalma	Dem
13	Dawn Euer	Dem	Dawn Euer	Dem
14	Valarie Lawson	Dem	Valarie Lawson	Dem
15	Meghan Kallman	Dem	Meghan Kallman	Dem
16	Jonathon Acosta	Dem	Jonathon Acosta	Dem
17	Thomas Paolino	Rep	Thomas Paolino	Rep
18	Cynthia Mendes	Dem	Robert Britto	Dem
19	Ryan W. Pearson	Dem	Ryan W. Pearson	Dem
20	Roger Picard	Dem	Roger Picard	Dem
21	Gordon Rogers	Rep	Gordon Rogers	Rep
22	Stephen Archambault	Dem	David Tikoian	Dem
23	Jessica de la Cruz	Rep	Jessica de la Cruz	Rep
24	Melissa Murray	Dem	Melissa Murray	Dem
25	Frank Lombardo	Dem	Frank Lombardo	Dem
26	Frank Lombardi	Dem	Frank Lombardi	Dem
27	Hanna Gallo	Dem	Hanna Gallo	Dem
28	Joshua Miller	Dem	Joshua Miller	Dem
29	Michael McCaffrey	Dem	**Anthony DeLuca II**	**Rep**
30	Jeanine Calkin	Dem	Mark McKenney	Dem
31	Kendra Anderson	Dem	Matthew LaMountain	Dem
32	Cynthia Armour Coyne	Dem	Pamela J. Lauria	Dem
33	Leonidas Raptakis	Dem	Leonidas Raptakis	Dem
34	Elaine J. Morgan	Rep	Elaine J. Morgan	Rep
35	Bridget Valverde	Dem	Bridget Valverde	Dem
36	Alana DiMario	Dem	Alana DiMario	Dem
37	V. Susan Sosnowski	Dem	V. Susan Sosnowski	Dem
38	Dennis Algiere	Rep	**Victoria Gu**	**Dem**

== Detailed Results by Senate District ==
Sources for election results:

=== District 1 ===
Primary Election Results
Party	Candidate	Votes	%
Democratic Party Primary Results
Democratic	Maryellen Goodwin (incumbent)	1,700	77.48%
Democratic	Donnie Anderson	494	22.52%
Total votes		2,194	100.00%

General Election Results
Party	Candidate	Votes	%
Democratic	Maryellen Goodwin (incumbent)	3,138	81.34%
Independent	Niyoka P. Powell	720	18.66%
Total votes		3,858	100.00%
Democratic hold			

=== District 2 ===
Primary Election Results
Party	Candidate	Votes	%
Democratic Party Primary Results
Democratic	Ana B. Quezada (incumbent)	2,222	100.00%
Total votes		2,222	100.00%

General Election Results
Party	Candidate	Votes	%
Democratic	Ana B. Quezada (incumbent)	2,979	100.00%
Total votes		2,979	100.00%
Democratic hold			

=== District 3 ===
Primary Election Results
Party	Candidate	Votes	%
Democratic Party Primary Results
Democratic	Samuel D. Zurier (incumbent)	3,355	73.53%
Democratic	Robin N. Xiong	1,208	26.47%
Total votes		4,563	100.00%

General Election Results
Party	Candidate	Votes	%
Democratic	Samuel D. Zurier (incumbent)	7,008	100.00%
Total votes		7,008	100.00%
Democratic hold			

=== District 4 ===
Primary Election Results
Party	Candidate	Votes	%
Democratic Party Primary Results
Democratic	Dominick J. Ruggerio (incumbent)	2,669	59.47%
Democratic	Leonardo Americo Cioe, Jr.	1,556	34.67%
Democratic	Stephen G. Tocco	263	5.86%
Total votes		4,488	100.00%

General Election Results
Party	Candidate	Votes	%
Democratic	Dominick J. Ruggerio (incumbent)	6,892	100.00%
Total votes		6,892	100.00%
Democratic hold			

=== District 5 ===
Primary Election Results
Party	Candidate	Votes	%
Democratic Party Primary Results
Democratic	Sam Bell (incumbent)	2,551	60.19%
Democratic	David A. Salvatore	1,687	39.81%
Total votes		4,238	100.00%

General Election Results
Party	Candidate	Votes	%
Democratic	Sam Bell (incumbent)	5,795	100.00%
Total votes		5,795	100.00%
Democratic hold			

=== District 6 ===
Primary Election Results
Party	Candidate	Votes	%
Democratic Party Primary Results
Democratic	Tiara T. Mack (incumbent)	1,540	56.00%
Democratic	Joseph S. Almeida	1,210	44.00%
Total votes		2,750	100.00%
Republican Party Primary Results
Republican	Adriana J. Bonilla	70	100.00%
Total votes		70	100.00%

General Election Results
Party	Candidate	Votes	%
Democratic	Tiara T. Mack (incumbent)	3,521	84.82%
Republican	Adriana J. Bonilla	630	15.18%
Total votes		4,151	100.00%
Democratic hold			

=== District 7 ===
Primary Election Results
Party	Candidate	Votes	%
Democratic Party Primary Results
Democratic	Frank Anthony Ciccone (incumbent)	1,449	67.68%
Democratic	Arthur C. Flanders, III	692	32.32%
Total votes		2,141	100.00%

General Election Results
Party	Candidate	Votes	%
Democratic	Frank Anthony Ciccone (incumbent)	3,136	100.00%
Total votes		3,136	100.00%
Democratic hold			

=== District 8 ===
Primary Election Results
Party	Candidate	Votes	%
Democratic Party Primary Results
Democratic	Sandra C. Cano (incumbent)	1,636	100.00%
Total votes		1,636	100.00%
Republican Party Primary Results
Republican	Cathyann Palocsik	205	100.00%
Total votes		205	100.00%

General Election Results
Party	Candidate	Votes	%
Democratic	Sandra C. Cano (incumbent)	3,510	67.66%
Republican	Cathyann Palocsik	1,678	32.34%
Total votes		5,188	100.00%
Democratic hold			

=== District 9 ===
Primary Election Results
Party	Candidate	Votes	%
Democratic Party Primary Results
Democratic	John P. Burke (incumbent)	1,648	100.00%
Total votes		1,648	100.00%
Republican Party Primary Results
Republican	Donald R. Raupp, Jr.	630	100.00%
Total votes		630	100.00%

General Election Results
Party	Candidate	Votes	%
Democratic	John P. Burke (incumbent)	5,027	55.67%
Republican	Donald R. Raupp, Jr.	4,003	44.33%
Total votes		9,030	100.00%
Democratic hold			

=== District 10 ===
Primary Election Results
Party	Candidate	Votes	%
Democratic Party Primary Results
Democratic	Walter S. Felag, Jr. (incumbent)	2,050	100.00%
Total votes		2,050	100.00%
Republican Party Primary Results
Republican	Allyn E. Meyers	615	100.00%
Total votes		615	100.00%

General Election Results
Party	Candidate	Votes	%
Democratic	Walter S. Felag, Jr. (incumbent)	6,378	60.08%
Republican	Allyn E. Meyers	4,237	39.92%
Total votes		10,615	100.00%
Democratic hold			

=== District 11 ===
Primary Election Results
Party	Candidate	Votes	%
Democratic Party Primary Results
Democratic	Linda L. Ujifusa	1,600	56.62%
Democratic	Matthew A. Chappell	1,226	43.38%
Total votes		2,826	100.00%
Republican Party Primary Results
Republican	Kenneth J. Mendonca	578	100.00%
Total votes		578	100.00%

General Election Results
Party	Candidate	Votes	%
Democratic	Linda L. Ujifusa	5,708	54.94%
Republican	Kenneth J. Mendonca	3,985	38.36%
Independent	Andrew V. Kelly	375	3.61%
Independent	Mario J. Teixeira	321	3.09%
Total votes		10,389	100.00%
Democratic hold			

=== District 12 ===
Primary Election Results
Party	Candidate	Votes	%
Democratic Party Primary Results
Democratic	Louis P. DiPalma (incumbent)	2,139	100.00%
Total votes		2,139	100.00%
Republican Party Primary Results
Republican	Stephen J. Horridge	566	100.00%
Total votes		566	100.00%

General Election Results
Party	Candidate	Votes	%
Democratic	Louis P. DiPalma (incumbent)	7,614	67.17%
Republican	Stephen J. Horridge	3,722	32.83%
Total votes		11,336	100.00%
Democratic hold			

=== District 13 ===
Primary Election Results
Party	Candidate	Votes	%
Democratic Party Primary Results
Democratic	Dawn M. Euer (incumbent)	2,574	100.00%
Total votes		2,574	100.00%
Republican Party Primary Results
Republican	David A. Quiroa	276	100.00%
Total votes		276	100.00%

General Election Results
Party	Candidate	Votes	%
Democratic	Dawn M. Euer (incumbent)	6,529	70.86%
Republican	David A. Quiroa	2,685	29.14%
Total votes		9,214	100.00%
Democratic hold			

=== District 14 ===
Primary Election Results
Party	Candidate	Votes	%
Democratic Party Primary Results
Democratic	Valarie J. Lawson (incumbent)	2,043	62.15%
Democratic	Megan S. Duckworth	1,244	37.85%
Total votes		3,287	100.00%
Republican Party Primary Results
Republican	David V. O'Connell	423	100.00%
Total votes		423	100.00%

General Election Results
Party	Candidate	Votes	%
Democratic	Valarie J. Lawson (incumbent)	4,856	59.91%
Republican	David V. O'Connell	2,697	33.28%
Independent	Nicholas Alexander Ferrara	552	6.81%
Total votes		8,105	100.00%
Democratic hold			

=== District 15 ===
Primary Election Results
Party	Candidate	Votes	%
Democratic Party Primary Results
Democratic	Meghan E. Kallman (incumbent)	2,797	100.00%
Total votes		2,797	100.00%
Republican Party Primary Results
Republican	Barbara J. Quigley	125	100.00%
Total votes		125	100.00%

General Election Results
Party	Candidate	Votes	%
Democratic	Meghan E. Kallman (incumbent)	4,953	81.05%
Republican	Barbara J. Quigley	1,158	18.95%
Total votes		6,111	100.00%
Democratic hold			

=== District 16 ===
Primary Election Results
Party	Candidate	Votes	%
Democratic Party Primary Results
Democratic	Jonathon Acosta (incumbent)	1,025	100.00%
Total votes		1,025	100.00%

General Election Results
Party	Candidate	Votes	%
Democratic	Jonathon Acosta (incumbent)	1,572	71.88%
Independent	Elizabeth A. Crowley	615	28.12%
Total votes		2,187	100.00%
Democratic hold			

=== District 17 ===
Primary Election Results
Party	Candidate	Votes	%
Republican Party Primary Results
Republican	Thomas J. Paolino (incumbent)	667	100.00%
Total votes		667	100.00%
Democratic Party Primary Results
Democratic	Cameron Joseph Deutsch	1,995	100.00%
Total votes		1,995	100.00%

General Election Results
Party	Candidate	Votes	%
Republican	Thomas J. Paolino (incumbent)	5,314	46.84%
Independent	John W. Lyle, Jr.	3,178	28.01%
Democratic	Cameron Joseph Deutsch	2,852	25.14%
Total votes		11,344	100.00%
Republican hold			

=== District 18 ===
Primary Election Results
Party	Candidate	Votes	%
Democratic Party Primary Results
Democratic	Robert Britto	1,779	55.11%
Democratic	Gregory R. Greco	1,449	44.89%
Total votes		3,228	100.00%
Republican Party Primary Results
Republican	Anna Maria Peters	407	100.00%
Total votes		407	100.00%

General Election Results
Party	Candidate	Votes	%
Democratic	Robert Britto	5,268	66.06%
Republican	Anna Maria Peters	2,706	33.94%
Total votes		7,974	100.00%
Democratic hold			

=== District 19 ===
Primary Election Results
Party	Candidate	Votes	%
Democratic Party Primary Results
Democratic	Ryan W. Pearson (incumbent)	2,625	100.00%
Total votes		2,625	100.00%
Republican Party Primary Results
Republican	Dionne Marie Larson	516	100.00%
Total votes		516	100.00%

General Election Results
Party	Candidate	Votes	%
Democratic	Ryan W. Pearson (incumbent)	6,128	59.59%
Republican	Dionne Marie Larson	4,156	40.41%
Total votes		10,284	100.00%
Democratic hold			

=== District 20 ===
Primary Election Results
Party	Candidate	Votes	%
Democratic Party Primary Results
Democratic	Roger A. Picard (incumbent)	1,668	100.00%
Total votes		1,668	100.00%
Republican Party Primary Results
Republican	Jonathan Matthew Resendes	417	100.00%
Total votes		417	100.00%

General Election Results
Party	Candidate	Votes	%
Democratic	Roger A. Picard (incumbent)	4,532	60.49%
Republican	Jonathan Matthew Resendes	2,960	39.51%
Total votes		7,492	100.00%
Democratic hold			

=== District 21 ===
Primary Election Results
Party	Candidate	Votes	%
Republican Party Primary Results
Republican	Gordon E. Rogers (incumbent)	973	100.00%
Total votes		973	100.00%
Democratic Party Primary Results
Democratic	Giang Bui	1,663	100.00%
Total votes		1,663	100.00%

General Election Results
Party	Candidate	Votes	%
Republican	Gordon E. Rogers (incumbent)	8,319	64.51%
Democratic	Giang Bui	4,577	35.49%
Total votes		12,896	100.00%
Republican hold			

=== District 22 ===
Primary Election Results
Party	Candidate	Votes	%
Democratic Party Primary Results
Democratic	David Tikoian	1,879	63.93%
Democratic	Melanie Gay DuPont	1,060	36.07%
Total votes		2,939	100.00%
Republican Party Primary Results
Republican	Paul M. Santucci	697	100.00%
Total votes		697	100.00%

General Election Results
Party	Candidate	Votes	%
Democratic	David Tikoian	5,869	53.60%
Republican	Paul M. Santucci	5,081	46.40%
Total votes		10,950	100.00%
Democratic hold			

=== District 23 ===
Primary Election Results
Party	Candidate	Votes	%
Republican Party Primary Results
Republican	Jessica de la Cruz (incumbent)	1,001	100.00%
Total votes		1,001	100.00%

General Election Results
Party	Candidate	Votes	%
Republican	Jessica de la Cruz (incumbent)	9,213	100.00%
Total votes		9,213	100.00%
Republican hold			

=== District 24 ===
Primary Election Results
Party	Candidate	Votes	%
Democratic Party Primary Results
Democratic	Melissa A. Murray (incumbent)	1,032	100.00%
Total votes		1,032	100.00%
Republican Party Primary Results
Republican	Craig J. Lacouture	325	100.00%
Total votes		325	100.00%

General Election Results
Party	Candidate	Votes	%
Democratic	Melissa A. Murray (incumbent)	2,763	56.40%
Republican	Craig J. Lacouture	2,136	43.60%
Total votes		4,899	100.00%
Democratic hold			

=== District 25 ===
Primary Election Results
Party	Candidate	Votes	%
Democratic Party Primary Results
Democratic	Frank Lombardo, III (incumbent)	2,011	59.92%
Democratic	Christopher B. Maselli	1,345	40.08%
Total votes		3,356	100.00%

General Election Results
Party	Candidate	Votes	%
Democratic	Frank Lombardo, III (incumbent)	7,257	100.00%
Total votes		7,257	100.00%
Democratic hold			

=== District 26 ===
Primary Election Results
Party	Candidate	Votes	%
Democratic Party Primary Results
Democratic	Frank S. Lombardi (incumbent)	1,686	68.93%
Democratic	Eric M. Asselin	760	31.07%
Total votes		2,446	100.00%
Republican Party Primary Results
Republican	Joseph A. Powers	690	100.00%
Total votes		690	100.00%

General Election Results
Party	Candidate	Votes	%
Democratic	Frank S. Lombardi (incumbent)	5,635	57.72%
Republican	Joseph A. Powers	4,128	42.28%
Total votes		9,763	100.00%
Democratic hold			

=== District 27 ===
Primary Election Results
Party	Candidate	Votes	%
Democratic Party Primary Results
Democratic	Hanna M. Gallo (incumbent)	2,500	100.00%
Total votes		2,500	100.00%

General Election Results
Party	Candidate	Votes	%
Democratic	Hanna M. Gallo (incumbent)	8,432	100.00%
Total votes		8,432	100.00%
Democratic hold			

=== District 28 ===
Primary Election Results
Party	Candidate	Votes	%
Democratic Party Primary Results
Democratic	Joshua Miller (incumbent)	2,819	100.00%
Total votes		2,819	100.00%

General Election Results
Party	Candidate	Votes	%
Democratic	Joshua Miller (incumbent)	6,480	100.00%
Total votes		6,480	100.00%
Democratic hold			

=== District 29 ===
Primary Election Results
Party	Candidate	Votes	%
Democratic Party Primary Results
Democratic	Jennifer T. Rourke	1,589	54.44%
Democratic	Michael C. Carreiro	1,330	45.56%
Total votes		2,919	100.00%
Republican Party Primary Results
Republican	Anthony DeLuca II	485	66.71%
Republican	Christopher R. Barker	242	33.29%
Total votes		727	100.00%

General Election Results
Party	Candidate	Votes	%
Republican	Anthony DeLuca II	5,257	52.42%
Democratic	Jennifer T. Rourke	4,772	47.58%
Total votes		10,029	100.00%
Republican gain from Democratic			

=== District 30 ===
Primary Election Results
Party	Candidate	Votes	%
Democratic Party Primary Results
Democratic	Mark P. McKenney	1,944	52.67%
Democratic	Jeanine Calkin (incumbent)	1,747	47.33%
Total votes		3,691	100.00%
Republican Party Primary Results
Republican	Marjorie Ann Tudino	736	100.00%
Total votes		736	100.00%

General Election Results
Party	Candidate	Votes	%
Democratic	Mark P. McKenney	7,338	57.36%
Republican	Marjorie Ann Tudino	5,454	42.64%
Total votes		12,792	100.00%
Democratic hold			

=== District 31 ===
Primary Election Results
Party	Candidate	Votes	%
Democratic Party Primary Results
Democratic	Matthew L. LaMountain	2,559	66.33%
Democratic	Harrison S. Tuttle	1,299	33.67%
Total votes		3,858	100.00%
Republican Party Primary Results
Republican	Lisa Morse	533	78.61%
Republican	John P. Silvaggio	145	21.39%
Total votes		678	100.00%

General Election Results
Party	Candidate	Votes	%
Democratic	Matthew L. LaMountain	7,016	61.49%
Republican	Lisa Morse	4,394	38.51%
Total votes		11,410	100.00%
Democratic hold			

=== District 32 ===
Primary Election Results
Party	Candidate	Votes	%
Democratic Party Primary Results
Democratic	Pamela J. Lauria	3,067	74.71%
Democratic	Susannah P. Holloway	1,038	25.29%
Total votes		4,105	100.00%
Republican Party Primary Results
Republican	Rhonda Holmes	695	100.00%
Total votes		695	100.00%

General Election Results
Party	Candidate	Votes	%
Democratic	Pamela J. Lauria	8,218	62.09%
Republican	Rhonda Holmes	5,017	37.91%
Total votes		13,235	100.00%
Democratic hold			

=== District 33 ===
Primary Election Results
Party	Candidate	Votes	%
Democratic Party Primary Results
Democratic	Leonidas P. Raptakis (incumbent)	1,797	100.00%
Total votes		1,797	100.00%

General Election Results
Party	Candidate	Votes	%
Democratic	Leonidas P. Raptakis (incumbent)	8,438	100.00%
Total votes		8,438	100.00%
Democratic hold			

=== District 34 ===
Primary Election Results
Party	Candidate	Votes	%
Republican Party Primary Results
Republican	Elaine J. Morgan (incumbent)	1,043	100.00%
Total votes		1,043	100.00%
Democratic Party Primary Results
Democratic	Jennifer C. Douglas	2,009	100.00%
Total votes		2,009	100.00%

General Election Results
Party	Candidate	Votes	%
Republican	Elaine J. Morgan (incumbent)	7,178	54.83%
Democratic	Jennifer C. Douglas	5,913	45.17%
Total votes		13,091	100.00%
Republican hold			

=== District 35 ===
Primary Election Results
Party	Candidate	Votes	%
Democratic Party Primary Results
Democratic	Bridget G. Valverde (incumbent)	3,296	100.00%
Total votes		3,296	100.00%
Republican Party Primary Results
Republican	Doreen M. Costa	835	100.00%
Total votes		835	100.00%

General Election Results
Party	Candidate	Votes	%
Democratic	Bridget G. Valverde (incumbent)	8,051	57.11%
Republican	Doreen M. Costa	6,047	42.89%
Total votes		14,098	100.00%
Democratic hold			

=== District 36 ===
Primary Election Results
Party	Candidate	Votes	%
Democratic Party Primary Results
Democratic	Alana M. DiMario (incumbent)	3,739	100.00%
Total votes		3,739	100.00%
Republican Party Primary Results
Republican	Patrick W. Murray	664	100.00%
Total votes		664	100.00%

General Election Results
Party	Candidate	Votes	%
Democratic	Alana M. DiMario (incumbent)	8,475	57.29%
Republican	Patrick W. Murray	6,317	42.71%
Total votes		14,792	100.00%
Democratic hold			

=== District 37 ===
Primary Election Results
Party	Candidate	Votes	%
Democratic Party Primary Results
Democratic	Virginia S. Sosnowski (incumbent)	2,757	100.00%
Total votes		2,757	100.00%
Republican Party Primary Results
Republican	Raymond E. Gardner	413	100.00%
Total votes		413	100.00%

General Election Results
Party	Candidate	Votes	%
Democratic	Virginia S. Sosnowski (incumbent)	6,077	57.80%
Republican	Raymond E. Gardner	3,084	29.34%
Independent	Anita Norton Jacobson	1,352	12.86%
Total votes		10,513	100.00%
Democratic hold			

=== District 38 ===
Primary Election Results
Party	Candidate	Votes	%
Republican Party Primary Results
Republican	Westin J. Place	607	100.00%
Total votes		607	100.00%
Democratic Party Primary Results
Democratic	Victoria Gu	1,942	66.33%
Democratic	Sharon E. Ahern	800	27.32%
Democratic	Michael T. Niemeyer	186	6.35%
Total votes		2,928	100.00%

General Election Results
Party	Candidate	Votes	%
Democratic	Victoria Gu	5,957	46.47%
Republican	Westin J. Place	3,524	27.49%
Independent	Caswell Cooke, Jr.	3,339	26.05%
Total votes		12,820	100.00%
Democratic gain from Republican			

== See also ==
- 2022 United States elections
- 2022 United States House of Representatives elections in Rhode Island
- 2022 Rhode Island elections
- 2022 Rhode Island gubernatorial election
- 2022 Rhode Island House of Representatives election
- Rhode Island General Assembly
