= 2024 Rhode Island Senate election =

- November 5, 2024

All 38 seats in the Rhode Island Senate 20 seats needed for a majority
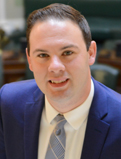

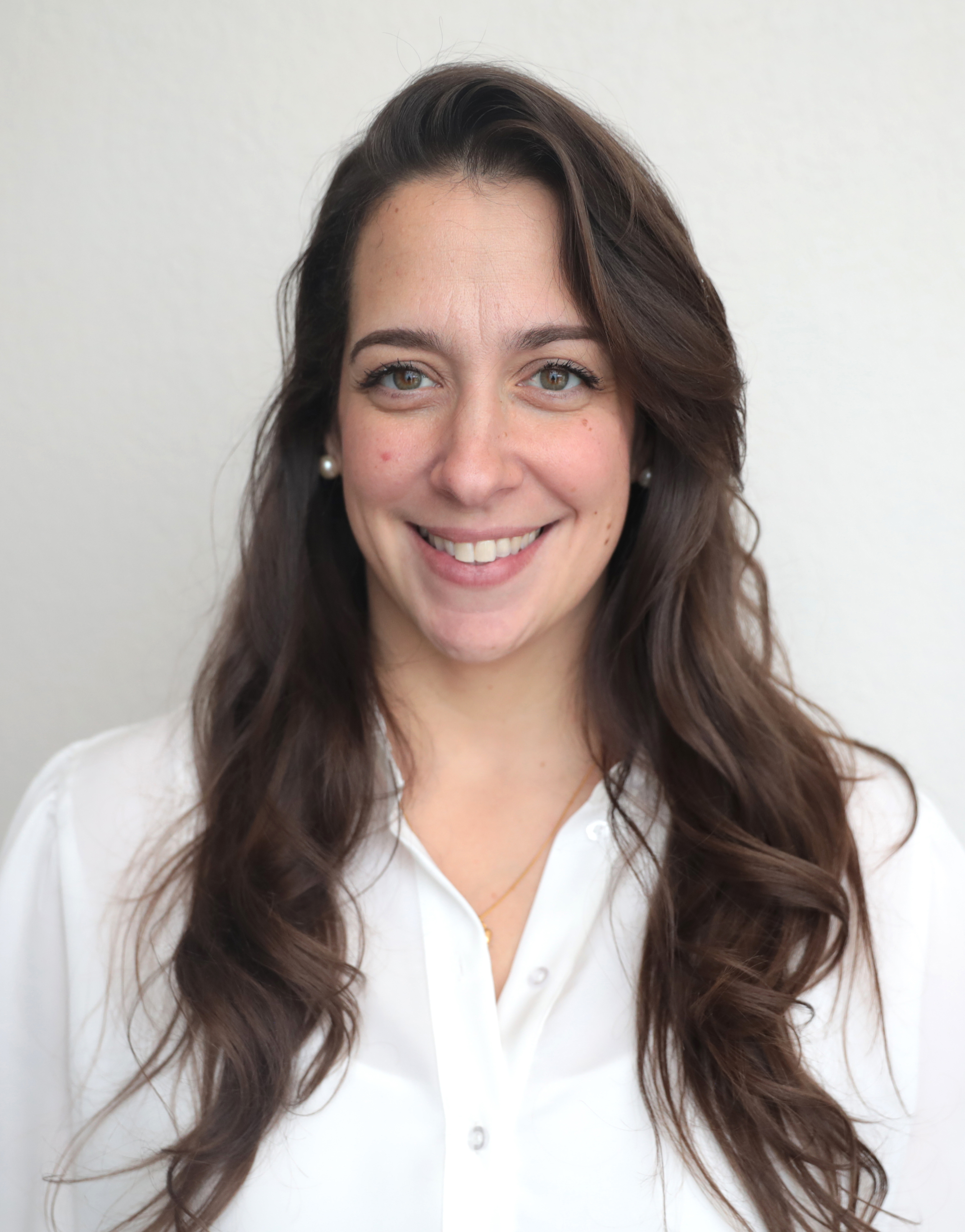
	Majority party	Minority party
Leader	Ryan Pearson	Jessica de la Cruz
Party	Democratic	Republican
Leader since	January 3, 2023	August 2, 2022
Leader's seat	19th	23rd
Last election	33	5
Seats after	34	4
Seat change	▲1	▼1
- Results: Democratic gain Democratic hold Republican hold
President before election
Dominick J. Ruggerio
Democratic
Elected President
Dominick J. Ruggerio
Democratic

The 2024 Rhode Island State Senate elections took place on Tuesday, November 5, 2024. The primary election was held on Tuesday, September 10, 2024. Rhode Island voters elected state senators in all 38 seats of the Senate to serve two-year terms.

The election coincided with United States national elections and Rhode Island state elections, including U.S. President, U.S. Senate, U.S. House, and Rhode Island House.

Following the previous election in 2022, Democrats held a 33-to-5-seat supermajority over Republicans. However, Democrat Frank Lombardo died on February 21, 2024, and Democrat Sandra Cano resigned on September 12, 2024. Therefore, going into the election, Democrats held a supermajority of 31 seats compared to the five seats held by Republicans.

== Retirements ==
Three incumbents did not seek re-election.

=== Democrats ===
1. District 20: Roger Picard is retiring.
2. District 26: Frank Lombardi is retiring.
3. District 28: Joshua Miller is retiring.

== Death and resignation ==
Two seats were left vacant on the day of the general election due to death and resignation in 2024.

=== Democrats ===
1. District 8: Sandra Cano resigned September 12 to take a job with the Small Business Administration.
2. District 25: Frank Lombardo died February 21 from bladder cancer.

== Predictions ==
Source	Ranking	As of
Sabato's Crystal Ball	Safe D	October 23, 2024

== 2023 special election (first district) ==
Special Election Sources:

Primary Election Results
Party	Candidate	Votes	%
Democratic Party Primary Results
Democratic	Jacob Bissaillon (Note: Sen. Maryellen Goodwin (D) of Senate District 1 died on April 15, 2023. Democrat Jacob Bissaillon won the subsequent special election and held the seat for his party.)	752	53.37%
Democratic	Nathan Biah	344	24.41%
Democratic	Michelle Rivera	268	19.02%
Democratic	Mario Mancebo	45	3.19%
Total votes		1,409	100.00%
Republican Party Primary Results
Republican	Niyoka Powell	18	100.00%
Total votes		18	100.00%

General Election Results
Party	Candidate	Votes	%
Democratic	Jacob Bissaillon	904	83.47%
Republican	Niyoka Powell	179	16.53%
Total votes		1,083	100.00%
Democratic hold			

== Summary ==
Party	Candidates	Votes	%	Seats		
Party	Candidates	Votes	%	Before	Won	+/–
Democratic	37	**315,596**	**72.82%**	**33**	**34**	▲1
**Republican**	15	98,031	22.62%	5	4	▼1
Independents	2	8,940	2.06%	0	0	Steady
Write-ins		10,831	2.50%	—	0	Steady
**Total**		433,398	100%	38		Steady

Popular vote
**Democratic**	72.82%
Republican	22.62%
Independents	2.06%
Write-in	2.50%

=== Results by State Senate district ===
Italics denote an open seat held by the incumbent party; bold text denotes a gain for a party.

Senate district	Incumbent	Party	Elected Senator	Party
1	Jake Bissaillon	Dem	Jake Bissaillon	Dem
2	Ana Quezada	Dem	Ana Quezada	Dem
3	Sam Zurier	Dem	Sam Zurier	Dem
4	Dominick Ruggerio	Dem	Dominick Ruggerio	Dem
5	Sam Bell	Dem	Sam Bell	Dem
6	Tiara Mack	Dem	Tiara Mack	Dem
7	Frank Ciccone	Dem	Frank Ciccone	Dem
8	Vacant (Note: Sen. Sandra Cano (D) resigned on September 12, 2024.)		Lori Urso	Dem
9	John Burke	Dem	John Burke	Dem
10	Walter Felag	Dem	Walter Felag	Dem
11	Linda Ujifusa	Dem	Linda Ujifusa	Dem
12	Louis DiPalma	Dem	Louis DiPalma	Dem
13	Dawn Euer	Dem	Dawn Euer	Dem
14	Valarie Lawson	Dem	Valarie Lawson	Dem
15	Meghan Kallman	Dem	Meghan Kallman	Dem
16	Jonathon Acosta	Dem	Jonathon Acosta	Dem
17	Thomas Paolino	Rep	Thomas Paolino	Rep
18	Robert Britto	Dem	Robert Britto	Dem
19	Ryan W. Pearson	Dem	Ryan W. Pearson	Dem
20	Roger Picard	Dem	Brian Thompson	Dem
21	Gordon Rogers	Rep	Gordon Rogers	Rep
22	David Tikoian	Dem	David Tikoian	Dem
23	Jessica de la Cruz	Rep	Jessica de la Cruz	Rep
24	Melissa Murray	Dem	Melissa Murray	Dem
25	Vacant (Note: Sen. Frank Lombardo (D) died on February 21, 2024.)		Andrew Dimitri	Dem
26	Frank Lombardi	Dem	Todd Patalano	Dem
27	Hanna Gallo	Dem	Hanna Gallo	Dem
28	Joshua Miller	Dem	Lammis Vargas	Dem
29	Anthony DeLuca	Rep	**Peter Appollonio Jr.**	**Dem**
30	Mark McKenney	Dem	Mark McKenney	Dem
31	Matthew LaMountain	Dem	Matthew LaMountain	Dem
32	Pamela J. Lauria	Dem	Pamela J. Lauria	Dem
33	Leonidas Raptakis	Dem	Leonidas Raptakis	Dem
34	Elaine J. Morgan	Rep	Elaine J. Morgan	Rep
35	Bridget Valverde	Dem	Bridget Valverde	Dem
36	Alana DiMario	Dem	Alana DiMario	Dem
37	V. Susan Sosnowski	Dem	V. Susan Sosnowski	Dem
38	Victoria Gu	Dem	Victoria Gu	Dem

== Detailed results by Senate district ==
Sources for election results:

=== District 1 ===
Rhode Island's 1st Senate District
Party	Candidate	Votes	%
Democratic	Jake Bissaillon (incumbent)	5,773	95.4
Write-in		277	4.6
Total votes		6,050	100.0
Democratic hold			

=== District 2 ===
Rhode Island's 2nd Senate District
Party	Candidate	Votes	%
Democratic	Ana Quezada (incumbent)	5,096	95.8
Write-in		224	4.2
Total votes		5,320	100.0
Democratic hold			

=== District 3 ===
Rhode Island's 3rd Senate District
Party	Candidate	Votes	%
Democratic	Sam Zurier (incumbent)	9,141	97.9
Write-in		198	2.1
Total votes		9,339	100.0
Democratic hold			

=== District 4 ===
Rhode Island's 4th Senate District
Party	Candidate	Votes	%
Democratic	Dominick J. Ruggerio (incumbent)	10,736	94.9
Write-in		580	5.1
Total votes		11,316	100.0
Democratic hold			

=== District 5 ===
Rhode Island's 5th Senate District
Party	Candidate	Votes	%
Democratic	Sam Bell (incumbent)	7,937	78.6
Republican	William Connell Jr.	2,105	20.8
Write-in		57	0.6
Total votes		10,099	100.0
Democratic hold			

=== District 6 ===
Rhode Island's 6th Senate District
Party	Candidate	Votes	%
Democratic	Tiara Mack (incumbent)	6,469	96.5
Write-in		236	3.5
Total votes		6,705	100.0
Democratic hold			

=== District 7 ===
Rhode Island's 7th Senate District
Party	Candidate	Votes	%
Democratic	Frank Ciccone (incumbent)	5,340	95.3
Write-in		264	4.7
Total votes		5,604	100.0
Democratic hold			

=== District 8 ===
Rhode Island's 8th Senate District
Party	Candidate	Votes	%
Democratic	Lori Urso	5,447	64.9
Independent	Cathyann Palocsik	2,870	34.2
Write-in		71	0.8
Total votes		8,388	100.0
Democratic hold			

=== District 9 ===
Rhode Island's 9th Senate District
Party	Candidate	Votes	%
Democratic	John Burke (incumbent)	9,337	93.0
Write-in		703	7.0
Total votes		10,040	100.0
Democratic hold			

=== District 10 ===
Rhode Island's 10th Senate District
Party	Candidate	Votes	%
Democratic	Walter Felag (incumbent)	8,641	57.9
Republican	Allyn Meyers	6,250	41.9
Write-in		36	0.2
Total votes		14,927	100.0
Democratic hold			

=== District 11 ===
Rhode Island's 11th Senate District
Party	Candidate	Votes	%
Democratic	Linda Ujifusa (incumbent)	10,250	95.8
Write-in		448	4.2
Total votes		10,698	100.0
Democratic hold			

=== District 12 ===
Rhode Island's 12th Senate District
Party	Candidate	Votes	%
Democratic	Louis DiPalma (incumbent)	11,140	96.5
Write-in		408	3.5
Total votes		11,548	100.0
Democratic hold			

=== District 13 ===
Rhode Island's 13th Senate District
Party	Candidate	Votes	%
Democratic	Dawn Euer (incumbent)	8,380	70.3
Republican	David Quiroa	3,519	29.5
Write-in		25	0.2
Total votes		11,924	100.0
Democratic hold			

=== District 14 ===
Rhode Island's 14th Senate District
Party	Candidate	Votes	%
Democratic	Valarie Lawson (incumbent)	8,936	94.2
Write-in		554	5.8
Total votes		9,490	100.0
Democratic hold			

=== District 15 ===
Rhode Island's 15th Senate District
Party	Candidate	Votes	%
Democratic	Meghan Kallman (incumbent)	8,456	97.2
Write-in		242	2.8
Total votes		8,698	100.0
Democratic hold			

=== District 16 ===
Rhode Island's 16th Senate District
Party	Candidate	Votes	%
Democratic	Jonathon Acosta (incumbent)	3,846	96.5
Write-in		140	3.5
Total votes		3,986	100.0
Democratic hold			

=== District 17 ===
Rhode Island's 17th Senate District
Party	Candidate	Votes	%
Republican	Thomas Paolino (incumbent)	8,726	57.9
Democratic	Cameron Deutsch	6,291	41.8
Write-in		43	0.3
Total votes		15,060	100.0
Republican hold			

=== District 18 ===
Rhode Island's 18th Senate District
Party	Candidate	Votes	%
Democratic	Robert Britto (incumbent)	9,186	95.0
Write-in		479	5.0
Total votes		9,665	100.0
Democratic hold			

=== District 19 ===
Rhode Island's 19th Senate District
Party	Candidate	Votes	%
Democratic	Ryan W. Pearson (incumbent)	8,083	56.9
Independent	Amanda Blais	6,070	42.7
Write-in		58	0.4
Total votes		14,211	100.0
Democratic hold			

=== District 20 ===
Rhode Island's 20th Senate District
Party	Candidate	Votes	%
Democratic	Brian Thompson	8,351	95.5
Write-in		390	4.5
Total votes		8,741	100.0
Democratic hold			

=== District 21 ===
Rhode Island's 21st Senate District
Party	Candidate	Votes	%
Republican	Gordon Rogers (incumbent)	12,732	95.5
Write-in		598	4.5
Total votes		13,330	100.0
Republican hold			

=== District 22 ===
Rhode Island's 22nd Senate District
Party	Candidate	Votes	%
Democratic	David Tikoian (incumbent)	11,523	95.3
Write-in		574	4.7
Total votes		12,097	100.0
Democratic hold			

=== District 23 ===
Rhode Island's 23rd Senate District
Party	Candidate	Votes	%
Republican	Jessica de la Cruz (incumbent)	11,054	68.1
Democratic	Lewis Pryeor	5,170	31.8
Write-in		16	0.1
Total votes		16,240	100.0
Republican hold			

=== District 24 ===
Rhode Island's 24th Senate District
Party	Candidate	Votes	%
Democratic	Melissa Murray (incumbent)	4,476	57.7
Republican	Craig Lacouture	3,259	42.0
Write-in		24	0.3
Total votes		7,759	100.0
Democratic hold			

=== District 25 ===
Rhode Island's 25th Senate District
Party	Candidate	Votes	%
Democratic	Andrew Dimitri	8,145	58.1
Republican	Karin Gorman	5,833	41.6
Write-in		37	0.3
Total votes		14,015	100.0
Democratic hold			

=== District 26 ===
Rhode Island's 26th Senate District
Party	Candidate	Votes	%
Democratic	Todd Patalano	7,853	57.6
Republican	Jennifer Caputi	5,744	42.1
Write-in		33	0.2
Total votes		13,630	100.0
Democratic hold			

=== District 27 ===
Rhode Island's 27th Senate District
Party	Candidate	Votes	%
Democratic	Hanna Gallo (incumbent)	11,554	94.2
Write-in		715	5.8
Total votes		12,269	100.0
Democratic hold			

=== District 28 ===
Rhode Island's 28th Senate District
Party	Candidate	Votes	%
Democratic	Lammis Vargas	9,242	95.3
Write-in		451	4.7
Total votes		9,693	100.0
Democratic hold			

=== District 29 ===
Rhode Island's 29th Senate District
Party	Candidate	Votes	%
Democratic	Peter Appollonio Jr.	6,849	50.1
Republican	Anthony DeLuca II (incumbent)	6,784	49.6
Write-in		34	0.2
Total votes		13,667	100.0
Democratic gain from Republican			

=== District 30 ===
Rhode Island's 30th Senate District
Party	Candidate	Votes	%
Democratic	Mark McKenney (incumbent)	12,347	94.1
Write-in		774	5.9
Total votes		13,121	100.0
Democratic hold			

=== District 31 ===
Rhode Island's 31st Senate District
Party	Candidate	Votes	%
Democratic	Matthew LaMountain (incumbent)	8,871	60.3
Republican	Lisa Morse	5,794	39.4
Write-in		35	0.2
Total votes		14,700	100.0
Democratic hold			

=== District 32 ===
Rhode Island's 32nd Senate District
Party	Candidate	Votes	%
Democratic	Pamela J. Lauria (incumbent)	13,072	95.3
Write-in		642	4.7
Total votes		13,714	100.0
Democratic hold			

=== District 33 ===
Rhode Island's 33rd Senate District
Party	Candidate	Votes	%
Democratic	Leonidas Raptakis (incumbent)	8,599	58.2
Republican	James Pierson	6,133	41.5
Write-in		43	0.3
Total votes		14,775	100.0
Democratic hold			

=== District 34 ===
Rhode Island's 34th Senate District
Party	Candidate	Votes	%
Republican	Elaine J. Morgan (incumbent)	9,040	53.5
Democratic	Stephen Moffitt	7,838	46.4
Write-in		23	0.1
Total votes		16,901	100.0
Republican hold			

=== District 35 ===
Rhode Island's 35th Senate District
Party	Candidate	Votes	%
Democratic	Bridget Valverde (incumbent)	12,621	94.4
Write-in		752	5.6
Total votes		13,373	100.0
Democratic hold			

=== District 36 ===
Rhode Island's 36th Senate District
Party	Candidate	Votes	%
Democratic	Alana DiMario (incumbent)	12,757	95.5
Write-in		602	4.5
Total votes		13,359	100.0
Democratic hold			

=== District 37 ===
Rhode Island's 37th Senate District
Party	Candidate	Votes	%
Democratic	V. Susan Sosnowski (incumbent)	8,517	66.0
Republican	Raymond Gardner	4,356	33.8
Write-in		31	0.2
Total votes		12,904	100.0
Democratic hold			

=== District 38 ===
Rhode Island's 38th Senate District
Party	Candidate	Votes	%
Democratic	Victoria Gu (incumbent)	9,326	58.1
Republican	Westin Place	6,702	41.8
Write-in		14	0.1
Total votes		16,042	100.0
Democratic hold			

== See also ==
- 2024 United States elections
- 2024 United States presidential election in Rhode Island
- 2024 United States Senate election in Rhode Island
- 2024 United States House of Representatives elections in Rhode Island
- 2024 Rhode Island House of Representatives election
- 2022 Rhode Island Senate election
- Rhode Island Senate
