= 2020 Rhode Island Senate election =

Rhode Island Senate election, 2020
- November 3, 2020

All 38 seats in the Rhode Island Senate 20 seats needed for a majority
	Majority party	Minority party
Leader	Michael McCaffrey	Dennis Algiere
Party	Democratic	Republican
Leader since	March 23, 2017	January 7, 1997
Leader's seat	4th	38th
Seats before	33	5
Seats won	33	5
Seat change	Steady	Steady
Popular vote	312,363	114,005
Percentage	69.9%	25.5%
- Results: Democratic hold Republican hold
President before election
Dominick J. Ruggerio
Democratic
Elected President
Dominick J. Ruggerio
Democratic

The 2020 Rhode Island Senate elections took place as part of the biennial United States elections. Rhode Island voters elected all 38 state senators. State senators serve two-year terms in the Rhode Island Senate. A primary election on September 8, 2020, determined which candidates appear on the November 3 general election ballot. All the members elected will serve in the Rhode Island General Assembly.

== Summary ==
=== Overview ===
Summary of the 2020 Rhode Island Senate election results
Party	Candidates	Votes	%	Seats		
Party	Candidates	Votes	%	Before	After	+/–
Democratic	36	312,363	69.89	33	33	Steady
Republican	16	114,005	25.51	5	5	Steady
Independent	5	10,085	2.26	0	0	Steady
Green	1	781	0.17	0	0	Steady
Write-in	—	9,688	2.17	0	0	Steady
Total		446,922	100.00	38	38	Steady

Popular vote
Democratic	69.89%
Republican	25.51%
Others	4.60%

Senate seats
Democratic	86.84%
Republican	13.16%

=== By district ===
District	Incumbent	Party	Elected senator	Party
1	Maryellen Goodwin	Dem	Maryellen Goodwin	Dem
2	Ana Quezada	Dem	Ana Quezada	Dem
3	Gayle Goldin	Dem	Gayle Goldin	Dem
4	Dominick J. Ruggerio	Dem	Dominick J. Ruggerio	Dem
5	Sam Bell	Dem	Sam Bell	Dem
6	Harold Metts	Dem	Tiara Mack	Dem
7	Frank Ciccone	Dem	Frank Ciccone	Dem
8	Sandra Cano	Dem	Sandra Cano	Dem
9	Adam Satchell	Dem	John Burke	Dem
10	Walter Felag	Dem	Walter Felag	Dem
11	James Seveney	Dem	James Seveney	Dem
12	Louis DiPalma	Dem	Louis DiPalma	Dem
13	Dawn Euer	Dem	Dawn Euer	Dem
14	Valerie Lawson	Dem	Valerie Lawson	Dem
15	Donna Nesselbush	Dem	Meghan Kallman	Dem
16	Elizabeth Crowley	Dem	Jonathon Acosta	Dem
17	Thomas Paolino	Rep	Thomas Paolino	Rep
18	William Conley Jr.	Dem	Cynthia Mendes	Dem
19	Ryan W. Pearson	Dem	Ryan W. Pearson	Dem
20	Roger Picard	Dem	Roger Picard	Dem
21	Gordon Rodgers	Rep	Gordon Rodgers	Rep
22	Stephen Archambault	Dem	Stephen Archambault	Dem
23	Jessica de la Cruz	Rep	Jessica de la Cruz	Rep
24	Melissa Murray	Dem	Melissa Murray	Dem
25	Frank Lombardo	Dem	Frank Lombardo	Dem
26	Frank Lombardi	Dem	Frank Lombardi	Dem
27	Hanna Gallo	Dem	Hanna Gallo	Dem
28	Joshua Miller	Dem	Joshua Miller	Dem
29	Michael McCaffrey	Dem	Michael McCaffrey	Dem
30	Mark McKenney	Dem	Jeanine Calkin	Dem
31	Erin Lynch Prata	Dem	Kendra Anderson	Dem
32	Cynthia Armour Coyne	Dem	Cynthia Armour Coyne	Dem
33	Leonidas Raptakis	Dem	Leonidas Raptakis	Dem
34	Elaine J. Morgan	Rep	Elaine J. Morgan	Rep
35	Bridget Valverde	Dem	Bridget Valverde	Dem
36	James Sheehan	Dem	Alana DiMario	Dem
37	V. Susan Sosnowski	Dem	V. Susan Sosnowski	Dem
38	Dennis Algiere	Rep	Dennis Algiere	Rep

== Retiring incumbents ==
Four incumbent senators (all Democrats) are not seeking reelection in 2020:

- District 9: Adam Satchell
- District 15: Donna Nesselbush retired
- District 31: Erin Lynch Prata (Seeking appointment to the Rhode Island Supreme Court)
- District 36: James Sheehan

== Defeated incumbents ==
=== In primary ===
Four incumbent senators (all Democrats) sought reelection but were defeated in the September 8 primary. The defeated were all beaten by progressive challengers who saw the incumbents as too conservative for the Democratic party.

- District 6: Harold Metts lost renomination to Tiara Mack, who won the general election.
- District 16: Betty Crowley lost renomination to Jonathon Acosta, who won the general election.
- District 18: William Conley Jr. lost renomination to Cynthia Mendes, who won the general election.
- District 30: Mark McKenney lost renomination to Jeanine Calkin, who won the general election.

== Predictions ==
Source	Ranking	As of
The Cook Political Report	Safe D	October 21, 2020

== Detailed results ==
=== District 1 ===
Democratic primary

District 1 Democratic primary
Party	Candidate	Votes	%
Democratic	Maryellen Goodwin (incumbent)	1,601	79.3
Democratic	Evan A. Lemoine	419	20.7
Total votes		2,020	100.0

- No other candidate filed for District 1.

General election

District 1 General Election, 2020
Party	Candidate	Votes	%
Democratic	Maryellen Goodwin (incumbent)	7,491	96.9
Write-in	Write-ins	236	3.1
Total votes		7,727	100.0
Democratic hold			

=== District 2 ===
- No other candidate filed for District 2.

District 2 General Election, 2020
Party	Candidate	Votes	%
Democratic	Ana Quezada (incumbent)	6,222	97.3
Write-in	Write-ins	170	2.7
Total votes		6,392	100.0
Democratic hold			

=== District 3 ===
- No other candidate filed for District 3

District 3 General Election, 2020
Party	Candidate	Votes	%
Democratic	Gayle Goldin (incumbent)	10,850	97.1
Write-in	Write-ins	328	2.9
Total votes		11,178	100.0
Democratic hold			

=== District 4 ===
Democratic primary

District 4 Democratic primary
Party	Candidate	Votes	%
Democratic	Dominick J. Ruggerio (incumbent)	1,974	54.7
Democratic	Leonardo Cioe Jr.	1,633	45.3
Total votes		3,607	100.0

General election

- No other candidate filed for District 4.

District 4 General Election, 2020
Party	Candidate	Votes	%
Democratic	Dominick J. Ruggerio (incumbent)	9,590	94.0
Write-in	Write-ins	611	6.0
Total votes		10,201	100.0
Democratic hold			

=== District 5 ===
Democratic primary

District 5 Democratic primary
Party	Candidate	Votes	%
Democratic	Sam Bell (incumbent)	2,139	72.5
Democratic	Jo-Ann Ryan	812	27.5
Total votes		2,951	100.0

General election

- No other candidate filed for District 5.

District District 5 General Election, 2020
Party	Candidate	Votes	%
Democratic	Sam Bell (incumbent)	7,656	96.8
Write-in	Write-ins	257	3.2
Total votes		7,913	100.0
Democratic hold			

=== District 6 ===
Democratic primary

District 6 Democratic primary
Party	Candidate	Votes	%
Democratic	Tiara Mack	1,506	59.8
Democratic	Harold Metts (incumbent)	1,011	40.2
Total votes		2,607	100.0

General election

District 6 General Election, 2020
Party	Candidate	Votes	%
Democratic	Tiara Mack	6,722	88.8
Green	Kevin Gilligan	781	10.3
Write-in	Write-ins	71	0.9
Total votes		7,574	100.0
Democratic hold			

=== District 7 ===
- No other candidate filed for District 7.

District 7 General Election, 2020
Party	Candidate	Votes	%
Democratic	Frank Ciccone (incumbent)	6,877	96.5
Write-in	Write-ins	251	3.5
Total votes		7,128	100.0
Democratic hold			

=== District 8 ===
District 8 General Election, 2020
Party	Candidate	Votes	%
Democratic	Sandra Cano (incumbent)	6,606	71.4
Republican	Richard Karsulavitch	2,610	28.2
Write-in	Write-ins	31	0.3
Total votes		9,247	100.0
Democratic hold			

=== District 9 ===
Democratic primary

District 9 Democratic primary
Party	Candidate	Votes	%
Democratic	John Burke	1,106	50.9
Democratic	Geoffrey Rousselle	1,066	49.1
Total votes		2,172	100.0

General election

District 9 General Election, 2020
Party	Candidate	Votes	%
Democratic	John Burke	7,367	58.5
Republican	Jeffery Kozlin	5,200	41.3
Write-in	Write-ins	26	0.2
Total votes		12,593	100.0
Democratic hold			

=== District 10 ===
District 10 General Election, 2020
Party	Candidate	Votes	%
Democratic	Walter Felag (incumbent)	9,245	64.1
Republican	Mark Smiley	5,145	35.7
Write-in	Write-ins	22	0.2
Total votes		14,412	100.0
Democratic hold			

=== District 11 ===
- No other candidate filed for District 11.

District 11 General Election, 2020
Party	Candidate	Votes	%
Democratic	James Seveney (incumbent)	10,927	96.2
Write-in	Write-ins	430	3.8
Total votes		11,357	100.0
Democratic hold			

=== District 12 ===
- No other candidate filed for District 12.

District 12 General Election, 2020
Party	Candidate	Votes	%
Democratic	Louis DiPalma (incumbent)	11,686	97.1
Write-in	Write-ins	351	2.9
Total votes		12,037	100.0
Democratic hold			

=== District 13 ===
- No other candidate filed for District 13.

District 13 General Election, 2020
Party	Candidate	Votes	%
Democratic	Dawn Euer (incumbent)	10,103	96.8
Write-in	Write-ins	329	3.2
Total votes		10,432	100.0
Democratic hold			

=== District 14 ===
District 14 General Election, 2020
Party	Candidate	Votes	%
Democratic	Valerie Lawson (incumbent)	8,062	72.3
Independent	Major Pettaway	3,017	27.1
Write-in	Write-ins	68	0.6
Total votes		11,147	100.0
Democratic hold			

=== District 15 ===
Democratic primary

Herbert Weiss

District 15 Democratic primary
Party	Candidate	Votes	%
Democratic	Meghan Kallman	1,662	60.9
Democratic	Herbert Weiss	635	23.3
Democratic	Robert Morris Jr.	431	15.8
Total votes		2,728	100.0

General election

- No other candidate filed for District 15.

District 15 General Election, 2020
Party	Candidate	Votes	%
Democratic	Meghan Kallman	7,812	96.8
Write-in	Write-ins	260	3.2
Total votes		8,072	100.0
Democratic hold			

=== District 16 ===
Democratic primary

District 16 Democratic primary
Party	Candidate	Votes	%
Democratic	Jonathon Acosta	973	50.5
Democratic	Elizabeth Crowley (incumbent)	768	39.8
Democratic	Leslie Estrada	187	9.7
Total votes		1,928	100.0

General election

- No other candidate filed for District 16.

District 16 General Election, 2020
Party	Candidate	Votes	%
Democratic	Jonathon Acosta	4,838	95.3
Write-in	Write-ins	238	4.7
Total votes		5,076	100.0
Democratic hold			

=== District 17 ===
District 17 General Election, 2020
Party	Candidate	Votes	%
Republican	Thomas Paolino (incumbent)	9,456	59.1
Democratic	John Douglas Barr II	6,510	40.7
Write-in	Write-ins	26	0.2
Total votes		15,992	100.0
Republican hold			

=== District 18 ===
Democratic primary

District 18 Democratic primary
Party	Candidate	Votes	%
Democratic	Cynthia Mendes	1,727	61.6
Democratic	William Conley Jr. (incumbent)	1,078	38.4
Total votes		2,805	100.0

General election

- No other candidate filed for District 18.

District 18 General Election, 2020
Party	Candidate	Votes	%
Democratic	Cynthia Mendes	10,013	94.8
Write-in	Write-ins	545	5.2
Total votes		10,558	100.0
Democratic hold			

=== District 19 ===
- No other candidate filed for District 19.

District 19 General Election, 2020
Party	Candidate	Votes	%
Democratic	Ryan W. Pearson (incumbent)	11,338	95.3
Write-in	Write-ins	556	4.7
Total votes		11,894	100.0
Democratic hold			

=== District 20 ===
- No other candidate filed for District 20.

District 20 General Election, 2020
Party	Candidate	Votes	%
Democratic	Roger Picard (incumbent)	8,989	96.6
Write-in	Write-ins	315	3.4
Total votes		9,304	100.0
Democratic hold			

=== District 21 ===
- No other candidate filed for District 21.

District 21 General Election, 2020
Party	Candidate	Votes	%
Republican	Gordon Rogers (incumbent)	12,314	95.2
Write-in	Write-ins	615	4.8
Total votes		12,929	100.0
Republican hold			

=== District 22 ===
Democratic primary

District 22 Democratic primary
Party	Candidate	Votes	%
Democratic	Stephen Archambault (incumbent)	1,342	59.1
Democratic	Melanie DuPont	927	40.9
Total votes		2,269	100.0

General election

District 22 General Election, 2020
Party	Candidate	Votes	%
Democratic	Stephen Archambault (incumbent)	7,282	50.2
Republican	Paul Santucci	6,053	42.1
Independent	Stephen Tocco	1,004	7.0
Write-in	Write-ins	35	0.2
Total votes		14,374	100.0
Democratic hold			

=== District 23 ===
District 23 General Election, 2020
Party	Candidate	Votes	%
Republican	Jessica de la Cruz (incumbent)	10,361	66.5
Democratic	Paul Roselli	5,131	32.9
Write-in	Write-ins	84	6.0
Total votes		15,576	100.0
Republican hold			

=== District 24 ===
- No other candidate filed for District 24.

District 24 General Election, 2020
Party	Candidate	Votes	%
Democratic	Melissa Murray (incumbent)	6,771	95.4
Write-in	Write-ins	323	4.6
Total votes		7,094	100.0
Democratic hold			

=== District 25 ===
- No other candidate filed for District 25.

District 25 General Election, 2020
Party	Candidate	Votes	%
Democratic	Frank Lombardo (incumbent)	10,829	95.8
Write-in	Write-ins	473	4.2
Total votes		11,302	100.0
Democratic hold			

=== District 26 ===
District 26 General Election, 2020
Party	Candidate	Votes	%
Democratic	Frank Lombardi (incumbent)	8,074	61.1
Republican	Anthony Fagundes Sr.	5,090	38.5
Write-in	Write-ins	41	0.3
Total votes		13,205	100.0
Democratic hold			

=== District 27 ===
District 27 General Election, 2020
Party	Candidate	Votes	%
Democratic	Hanna Gallo (incumbent)	8,079	54.7
Republican	Pat Cortellessa	5,865	39.7
Independent	Jonathan Keith	813	5.5
Write-in	Write-ins	16	0.1
Total votes		14,773	100.0
Democratic hold			

=== District 28 ===
District 28 General Election, 2020
Party	Candidate	Votes	%
Democratic	Joshua Miller (incumbent)	8,259	70.0
Independent	Robert Schattle	3,472	29.4
Write-in	Write-ins	62	0.5
Total votes		11,793	100.0
Democratic hold			

=== District 29 ===
Democratic primary

District 29 Democratic primary
Party	Candidate	Votes	%
Democratic	Michael McCaffrey (incumbent)	1,952	58.2
Democratic	Jennifer Rourke	1,403	41.8
Total votes		3,355	100.0

General election

District 29 General Election, 2020
Party	Candidate	Votes	%
Democratic	Michael McCaffrey (incumbent)	9,751	65.5
Republican	Jean Trafford	5,044	33.9
Write-in	Write-ins	83	0.6
Total votes		14,878	100.0
Democratic hold			

=== District 30 ===
Democratic primary

District 30 Democratic primary
Party	Candidate	Votes	%
Democratic	Jeanine Calkin	1,509	55.4
Democratic	Mark McKenney (incumbent)	1,217	44.6
Total votes		2,726	100.0

General election

- No other candidate filed for District 30.

District 30 General Election, 2020
Party	Candidate	Votes	%
Democratic	Jeanine Calkin	10,611	92.4
Write-in	Write-ins	872	7.6
Total votes		11,483	100.0
Democratic hold			

=== District 31 ===
Democratic primary

District 31 Democratic primary
Party	Candidate	Votes	%
Democratic	Kendra Anderson	1,016	30.9
Democratic	Steve Merolla	852	25.9
Democratic	Brian Dunckley	771	23.4
Democratic	Michael Mita	653	19.8
Total votes		3,292	100.0

Republican primary

District 31 Republican primary
Party	Candidate	Votes	%
Republican	Scott Zambarano	389	80.7
Republican	John Silvaggio	93	19.3
Total votes		482	100.0

General election

District 31 General Election, 2020
Party	Candidate	Votes	%
Democratic	Kendra Anderson	8,221	54.4
Republican	Scott Zambarano	6,871	45.5
Write-in	Write-ins	23	0.2
Total votes		15,115	100.0
Democratic hold			

=== District 32 ===
- No other candidate filed for District 32.

General election

District 32 General Election, 2020
Party	Candidate	Votes	%
Democratic	Cynthia Armour Coyne (incumbent)	13,122	95.7
Write-in	Write-ins	584	4.3
Total votes		13,706	100.0
Democratic hold			

=== District 33 ===
- No other candidate filed for District 33.

District 33 General Election, 2020
Party	Candidate	Votes	%
Democratic	Leonidas Raptakis (incumbent)	11,610	94.0
Write-in	Write-ins	735	6.0
Total votes		12,345	100.0
Democratic hold			

=== District 34 ===
District 34 General Election, 2020
Party	Candidate	Votes	%
Republican	Elaine J. Morgan (incumbent)	8,967	54.0
Democratic	Jennifer Douglas	7,618	45.9
Write-in	Write-ins	13	0.1
Total votes		16,598	100.0
Republican hold			

=== District 35 ===
District 35 General Election, 2020
Party	Candidate	Votes	%
Democratic	Bridget Valverde (incumbent)	9,363	55.5
Republican	Charles Callanan	7,479	44.3
Write-in	Write-ins	23	0.1
Total votes		16,865	100.0
Democratic hold			

=== District 36 ===
Democratic primary

District 36 Democratic primary
Party	Candidate	Votes	%
Democratic	Alana DiMario	2,499	75.2
Democratic	Steve Merolla	824	24.8
Total votes		3,323	100.0

General election

District 36 General Election, 2020
Party	Candidate	Votes	%
Democratic	Alana DiMario	8,609	50.1
Republican	Doreen Costa	6,770	39.4
Independent	Matthew Mannix	1,779	10.4
Write-in	Write-ins	23	0.1
Total votes		17,181	100.0
Democratic hold			

=== District 37 ===
District 37 General Election, 2020
Party	Candidate	Votes	%
Democratic	V. Susan Sosnowski (incumbent)	10,129	69.2
Republican	David Tacey	4,453	30.4
Write-in	Write-ins	51	0.3
Total votes		14,633	100.0
Democratic hold			

=== District 38 ===
- No other candidate filed for District 38.

District 38 General Election, 2020
Party	Candidate	Votes	%
Republican	Dennis Algiere (incumbent)	12,327	96.0
Write-in	Write-ins	511	4.0
Total votes		12,838	100.0
Republican hold			

== See also ==
- 2020 Rhode Island elections
- 2020 Rhode Island House of Representatives election
- 2020 United States elections
