= 2018 Rhode Island Senate election =

- November 6, 2018

All 38 seats in the Rhode Island Senate 20 seats needed for a majority

| | Majority party | Minority party |
|---|---|---|
| Leader | Michael McCaffrey | Dennis Algiere |
| Party | Democratic | Republican |
| Leader since | March 23, 2017 | January 7, 1997 |
| Leader's seat | District 29 | District 38 |
| Last election | 33 | 5 |
| Seats after | 33 | 5 |
| Seat change | Steady | Steady |
| Popular vote | 242,177 | 93,049 |
| Percentage | 69.56% | 26.73% |
President of the Senate before election
Dominick J. Ruggerio
Democratic
Elected President of the Senate
Dominick J. Ruggerio
Democratic

The 2018 Rhode Island Senate election was held on November 6, 2018, to determine which party would control the Rhode Island Senate for the following two years. All 38 seats in the Rhode Island Senate were up for election. Prior to the election, 33 seats were held by Democrats and 5 seats were held by Republicans. The general election saw neither party gain nor lose any seats, meaning Democrats retained their majority in the State Senate.

== Predictions ==
| Source | Ranking | As of |
|---|---|---|
| Governing | Safe D | October 8, 2018 |

== Retirements ==
=== Democrats ===
1. District 14: Daniel Da Ponte retired.
2. District 23: Paul Fogarty retired.
3. District 24: Marc Cote retired.

=== Republicans ===
1. District 21: Nicholas Kettle retired.
2. District 35: Mark Gee retired.

== Defeated incumbents ==
=== In primary ===
==== Democrats ====
1. District 5: Paul Jabour lost renomination to Sam Bell.

== Closest races ==
Seats where the margin of victory was under 10%:

1. District 17, 1.16%
2. District 35, 7.84% (gain)
3. District 34, 8.68%
4. District 33, 9.35%

== Results ==
=== District 1 ===
District 1 election, 2018
| Party | Candidate | Votes | % |
|---|---|---|---|
| Democratic | Maryellen Goodwin (incumbent) | 5,452 | 97.25% |
| | Scattering | 154 | 2.75% |
| Total votes | | 5,606 | 100.0% |
| Democratic hold | | | |

=== District 2 ===
District 2 election, 2018
| Party | Candidate | Votes | % |
|---|---|---|---|
| Democratic | Ana Quezada (incumbent) | 5,037 | 97.39% |
| | Scattering | 135 | 2.61% |
| Total votes | | 5,172 | 100.0% |
| Democratic hold | | | |

=== District 3 ===
District 3 election, 2018
| Party | Candidate | Votes | % |
|---|---|---|---|
| Democratic | Gayle Goldin (incumbent) | 9,426 | 97.57% |
| | Scattering | 235 | 2.43% |
| Total votes | | 9,661 | 100.0% |
| Democratic hold | | | |

=== District 4 ===
District 4 election, 2018
| Party | Candidate | Votes | % |
|---|---|---|---|
| Democratic | Dominick J. Ruggerio (incumbent) | 7,293 | 95.92% |
| | Scattering | 310 | 4.08% |
| Total votes | | 7,603 | 100.0% |
| Democratic hold | | | |

=== District 5 ===
District 5 election, 2018
| Party | Candidate | Votes | % |
|---|---|---|---|
| Democratic | Sam Bell | 5,868 | 96.70% |
| | Scattering | 200 | 3.30% |
| Total votes | | 6,068 | 100.0% |
| Democratic hold | | | |

=== District 6 ===
District 6 election, 2018
| Party | Candidate | Votes | % |
|---|---|---|---|
| Democratic | Harold Metts (incumbent) | 5,473 | 97.16% |
| | Scattering | 160 | 2.84% |
| Total votes | | 5,633 | 100.0% |
| Democratic hold | | | |

=== District 7 ===
District 7 election, 2018
| Party | Candidate | Votes | % |
|---|---|---|---|
| Democratic | Frank Ciccone (incumbent) | 5,075 | 96.56% |
| | Scattering | 181 | 3.44% |
| Total votes | | 5,256 | 100.0% |
| Democratic hold | | | |

=== District 8 ===
District 8 election, 2018
| Party | Candidate | Votes | % |
|---|---|---|---|
| Democratic | Sandra Cano (incumbent) | 4,707 | 72.66% |
| Republican | Richard Karsulavitch | 1,752 | 27.05% |
| | Scattering | 19 | 0.29% |
| Total votes | | 6,478 | 100.0% |
| Democratic hold | | | |

=== District 9 ===
District 9 election, 2018
| Party | Candidate | Votes | % |
|---|---|---|---|
| Democratic | Adam Satchell (incumbent) | 5,487 | 62.76% |
| Republican | David Gaipo | 3,242 | 37.09% |
| | Scattering | 13 | 0.15% |
| Total votes | | 8,742 | 100.0% |
| Democratic hold | | | |

=== District 10 ===
District 10 election, 2018
| Party | Candidate | Votes | % |
|---|---|---|---|
| Democratic | Walter Felag (incumbent) | 8,635 | 97.22% |
| | Scattering | 247 | 2.78% |
| Total votes | | 8,882 | 100.0% |
| Democratic hold | | | |

=== District 11 ===
District 11 election, 2018
| Party | Candidate | Votes | % |
|---|---|---|---|
| Democratic | James Seveney (incumbent) | 6,798 | 62.28% |
| Republican | Stephanie Calise | 4,103 | 37.59% |
| | Scattering | 14 | 0.13% |
| Total votes | | 10,915 | 100.0% |
| Democratic hold | | | |

=== District 12 ===
District 12 election, 2018
| Party | Candidate | Votes | % |
|---|---|---|---|
| Democratic | Louis DiPalma (incumbent) | 7,296 | 66.20% |
| Republican | Amy Veri | 3,714 | 33.70% |
| | Scattering | 11 | 0.10% |
| Total votes | | 11,021 | 100.0% |
| Democratic hold | | | |

=== District 13 ===
District 13 election, 2018
| Party | Candidate | Votes | % |
|---|---|---|---|
| Democratic | Dawn Euer (incumbent) | 7,166 | 71.62% |
| Republican | Matthew Paul Perry | 2,827 | 28.26% |
| | Scattering | 12 | 0.12% |
| Total votes | | 10,005 | 100.0% |
| Democratic hold | | | |

=== District 14 ===
District 14 election, 2018
| Party | Candidate | Votes | % |
|---|---|---|---|
| Democratic | Valerie Lawson (incumbent) | 6,867 | 96.01% |
| | Scattering | 281 | 3.99% |
| Total votes | | 7,048 | 100.0% |
| Democratic hold | | | |

=== District 15 ===
District 15 election, 2018
| Party | Candidate | Votes | % |
|---|---|---|---|
| Democratic | Donna Nesselbush (incumbent) | 5,614 | 96.88% |
| | Scattering | 181 | 3.12% |
| Total votes | | 5,795 | 100.0% |
| Democratic hold | | | |

=== District 16 ===
District 16 election, 2018
| Party | Candidate | Votes | % |
|---|---|---|---|
| Democratic | Elizabeth Crowley (incumbent) | 3,399 | 97.53% |
| | Scattering | 86 | 2.47% |
| Total votes | | 3,485 | 100.0% |
| Democratic hold | | | |

=== District 17 ===
District 17 election, 2018
| Party | Candidate | Votes | % |
|---|---|---|---|
| Republican | Thomas Paolino (incumbent) | 5,998 | 50.50% |
| Democratic | Dennis Lavallee | 5,860 | 49.34% |
| | Scattering | 19 | 0.16% |
| Total votes | | 11,877 | 100.0% |
| Republican hold | | | |

=== District 18 ===
District 18 election, 2018
| Party | Candidate | Votes | % |
|---|---|---|---|
| Democratic | William Conley Jr. (incumbent) | 6,748 | 72.69% |
| Independent | Jack Peters | 2,490 | 26.82% |
| | Scattering | 45 | 0.49% |
| Total votes | | 9,283 | 100.0% |
| Democratic hold | | | |

=== District 19 ===
District 19 election, 2018
| Party | Candidate | Votes | % |
|---|---|---|---|
| Democratic | Ryan W. Pearson (incumbent) | 6,446 | 59.22% |
| Republican | Billy Charette | 4,429 | 40.69% |
| | Scattering | 10 | 0.09% |
| Total votes | | 10,885 | 100.0% |
| Democratic hold | | | |

=== District 20 ===
District 20 election, 2018
| Party | Candidate | Votes | % |
|---|---|---|---|
| Democratic | Roger Picard (incumbent) | 4,938 | 61.57% |
| Republican | Michael Veri | 3,073 | 38.32% |
| | Scattering | 9 | 0.11% |
| Total votes | | 8,020 | 100.0% |
| Democratic hold | | | |

=== District 21 ===
District 21 election, 2018
| Party | Candidate | Votes | % |
|---|---|---|---|
| Republican | Gordon Rogers (incumbent) | 5,271 | 42.46% |
| Independent | Michael Fine | 3,758 | 30.27% |
| Democratic | James Safford | 3,377 | 27.20% |
| | Scattering | 9 | 0.07% |
| Total votes | | 12,415 | 100.0% |
| Republican hold | | | |

=== District 22 ===
District 22 election, 2018
| Party | Candidate | Votes | % |
|---|---|---|---|
| Democratic | Stephen Archambault (incumbent) | 7,018 | 61.60% |
| Republican | Gregory James Tocco | 3,829 | 37.93% |
| | Scattering | 47 | 0.47% |
| Total votes | | 10,094 | 100.0% |
| Democratic hold | | | |

=== District 23 ===
District 23 election, 2018
| Party | Candidate | Votes | % |
|---|---|---|---|
| Republican | Jessica de la Cruz | 6,217 | 55.45% |
| Democratic | Kevin Heitke | 4,983 | 44.44% |
| | Scattering | 12 | 0.11% |
| Total votes | | 11,212 | 100.0% |
| Republican gain from Democratic | | | |

=== District 24 ===
District 24 election, 2018
| Party | Candidate | Votes | % |
|---|---|---|---|
| Democratic | Melissa Murray | 3,832 | 58.89% |
| Independent | Glenn Dusablon | 1,418 | 21.79% |
| Independent | Richard Garrepy | 905 | 13.91% |
| Independent | Michael Disney | 327 | 5.03% |
| | Scattering | 25 | 0.38% |
| Total votes | | 6,507 | 100.0% |
| Democratic hold | | | |

=== District 25 ===
District 25 election, 2018
| Party | Candidate | Votes | % |
|---|---|---|---|
| Democratic | Frank Lombardo (incumbent) | 6,123 | 59.39% |
| Republican | Frank Ricci | 4,163 | 40.38% |
| | Scattering | 24 | 0.23% |
| Total votes | | 10,310 | 100.0% |
| Democratic hold | | | |

=== District 26 ===
District 26 election, 2018
| Party | Candidate | Votes | % |
|---|---|---|---|
| Democratic | Frank Lombardi (incumbent) | 7,916 | 95.89% |
| | Scattering | 339 | 4.11% |
| Total votes | | 8,255 | 100.0% |
| Democratic hold | | | |

=== District 27 ===
District 27 election, 2018
| Party | Candidate | Votes | % |
|---|---|---|---|
| Democratic | Hanna Gallo (incumbent) | 7,045 | 60.48% |
| Republican | Jonathan Keith | 4,588 | 39.39% |
| | Scattering | 15 | 0.13% |
| Total votes | | 11,648 | 100.0% |
| Democratic hold | | | |

=== District 28 ===
District 28 election, 2018
| Party | Candidate | Votes | % |
|---|---|---|---|
| Democratic | Joshua Miller (incumbent) | 7,781 | 96.26% |
| | Scattering | 302 | 3.74% |
| Total votes | | 8,083 | 100.0% |
| Democratic hold | | | |

=== District 29 ===
District 29 election, 2018
| Party | Candidate | Votes | % |
|---|---|---|---|
| Democratic | Michael McCaffrey (incumbent) | 9,187 | 94.94% |
| | Scattering | 490 | 5.06% |
| Total votes | | 9,677 | 100.0% |
| Democratic hold | | | |

=== District 30 ===
District 30 election, 2018
| Party | Candidate | Votes | % |
|---|---|---|---|
| Democratic | Mark McKenney (incumbent) | 8,443 | 94.31% |
| | Scattering | 509 | 5.69% |
| Total votes | | 8,952 | 100.0% |
| Democratic hold | | | |

=== District 31 ===
District 31 election, 2018
| Party | Candidate | Votes | % |
|---|---|---|---|
| Democratic | Erin Lynch Prata (incumbent) | 7,052 | 61.35% |
| Republican | Jennifer Moffat | 4,429 | 38.53% |
| | Scattering | 14 | 0.12% |
| Total votes | | 11,495 | 100.0% |
| Democratic hold | | | |

=== District 32 ===
District 32 election, 2018
| Party | Candidate | Votes | % |
|---|---|---|---|
| Democratic | Cynthia Armour Coyne (incumbent) | 8,826 | 67.56% |
| Republican | David Aucoin | 4,224 | 32.33% |
| | Scattering | 14 | 0.11% |
| Total votes | | 13,064 | 100.0% |
| Democratic hold | | | |

=== District 33 ===
District 33 election, 2018
| Party | Candidate | Votes | % |
|---|---|---|---|
| Democratic | Leonidas Raptakis (incumbent) | 6,154 | 54.56% |
| Republican | Scott Copley | 5,099 | 45.21% |
| | Scattering | 26 | 0.23% |
| Total votes | | 11,279 | 100.0% |
| Democratic hold | | | |

=== District 34 ===
District 34 election, 2018
| Party | Candidate | Votes | % |
|---|---|---|---|
| Republican | Elaine J. Morgan (incumbent) | 6,529 | 54.29% |
| Democratic | Jennifer Douglas | 5,484 | 45.61% |
| | Scattering | 12 | 0.10% |
| Total votes | | 12,025 | 100.0% |
| Republican hold | | | |

=== District 35 ===
District 35 election, 2018
| Party | Candidate | Votes | % |
|---|---|---|---|
| Democratic | Bridget Valverde | 7,136 | 53.88% |
| Republican | Dana Gee | 6,097 | 46.04% |
| | Scattering | 11 | 0.08% |
| Total votes | | 13,244 | 100.0% |
| Democratic gain from Republican | | | |

=== District 36 ===
District 36 election, 2018
| Party | Candidate | Votes | % |
|---|---|---|---|
| Democratic | James Sheehan (incumbent) | 8,830 | 66.94% |
| Republican | John Silvaggio | 4,313 | 32.70% |
| | Scattering | 47 | 0.36% |
| Total votes | | 13,190 | 100.0% |
| Democratic hold | | | |

=== District 37 ===
District 37 election, 2018
| Party | Candidate | Votes | % |
|---|---|---|---|
| Democratic | V. Susan Sosnowski (incumbent) | 9,405 | 96.73% |
| | Scattering | 318 | 3.27% |
| Total votes | | 9,723 | 100.0% |
| Democratic hold | | | |

=== District 38 ===
District 38 election, 2018
| Party | Candidate | Votes | % |
|---|---|---|---|
| Republican | Dennis Algiere (incumbent) | 9,152 | 95.94% |
| | Scattering | 387 | 4.06% |
| Total votes | | 9,539 | 100.0% |
| Republican hold | | | |
