= Senator DeLuca =

Senator DeLuca may refer to:

- Anthony J. DeLuca (fl. 1990s–2010s), Delaware State Senate
- Anthony DeLuca II (born 1982), Rhode Island State Senate
- Louis DeLuca (1933–2023), Connecticut State Senate
