= Bethany Moura =

American politician

Member of the Rhode Island Senate from the 19th district
- In office January 4, 2011 – January 1, 2013
- Preceded by: Daniel Connors
- Succeeded by: Ryan W. Pearson

Personal details
- Born: September 6, 1976 (age 50)
- Party: Republican

Bethany Moura (born September 6, 1976) is an American politician who served in the Rhode Island Senate from the 19th district from 2011 to 2013.
