= Senator Lombardi =

Senator Lombardi may refer to:

- Frank Lombardi (born 1962), Rhode Island State Senate
- Tarky Lombardi Jr. (1929–2024), New York State Senator
