= David Bates (Rhode Island politician) =

American politician (1941–2017)

Member of the Rhode Island Senate from the 32nd district
- In office January 2007 – January 2015
- Preceded by: Stephen Alves
- Succeeded by: Cynthia Armour Coyne

Member of the Rhode Island Senate from the 9th district
- In office January 2003 – January 2007
- Preceded by: Charles Walton
- Succeeded by: Stephen Alves

Member of the Rhode Island Senate from the 44th district
- In office January 1995 – January 2003
- Preceded by: Peter Bouchard
- Succeeded by: District abolished

Personal details
- Born: April 21, 1941 Medford, Massachusetts, U.S.
- Died: March 8, 2017 (aged 75)
- Party: Republican
- Education: University of Massachusetts Amherst (BA)

David E. Bates (born April 21, 1941 – March 8, 2017) was an American politician and a Republican member of the Rhode Island Senate representing District 32 since January 2007. Bates served consecutively from January 1993 until January 2007 in the District 9 and District 44 seats.

== Education ==
Bates earned his BA degree from the University of Massachusetts Amherst.

== Elections ==
- 2012 Bates was unopposed for both the September 11, 2012 Republican Primary and the November 6, 2012 General election, winning with 9,926 votes.
- 1992 Initially in District 44, Bates won the September 15, 1992 Republican Primary and won the November 3, 1992 General election with 5,657 votes (56.3%) against Democratic nominee Peter Orlando.
- 1994 Bates was unopposed for both the September 13, 1994 Republican Primary and the November 8, 1994 General election, winning with 6,507 votes.
- 1996 Bates was unopposed for the September 10, 1996 Republican Primary, winning with 464 votes, and won the November 5, 1996 General election with 4,475 votes (73.6%) against Cool Moose Party candidate Matthew Piccerelli.
- 1998 Bates was unopposed for both the September 15, 1998 Republican Primary and the November 3, 1998 General election, winning with 5,617 votes.
- 2000 Bates was unopposed for both the September 12, 2000 Republican Primary and the November 7, 2000 General election, winning with 7,263 votes.
- 2002 Redistricted to District 9, and with incumbent Democratic Senator Charles Walton redistricted to District 2, Bates was unopposed for both the September 10, 2002 Republican Primary, winning with 1,161 votes, and the November 5, 2002 General election, winning with 7,791 votes.
- 2004 Bates was unopposed for the September 14, 2004 Republican Primary and won the November 2, 2004 General election with 7,025 votes (55.4%) against Democratic nominee E. Jenny Flanagan.
- 2006 Redistricted to District 32, and with incumbent Senator Stephen Alves redistricted to District 9, Bates and returning 2004 Democratic challenger E. Jenny Flanagan were both unopposed for their September 12, 2006 primaries, setting up a rematch; Bates won the November 7, 2006 General election with 6,004 votes (50.7%) against Flanagan.
- 2008 Bates was unopposed for the September 9, 2008 Republican Primary and won the November 4, 2008 General election with 6,989 votes (51.3%) against Democratic nominee Lawrence Signore.
- 2010 Bates was unopposed for the September 23, 2010 Republican Primary, winning with 584 votes, and won the November 2, 2010 General election with 5,930 votes (53.6%) against Democratic nominee Jim Hasenfus.
