= Michael Pinga =

American politician

Member of the Rhode Island Senate from the 9th district
- In office January 6, 2009 – January 1, 2013
- Preceded by: Stephen Alves
- Succeeded by: Adam Satchell

Personal details
- Born: January 3, 1963 (age 63)
- Party: Democratic

Michael Pinga (born January 3, 1963) is an American politician who served in the Rhode Island Senate from the 9th district from 2009 to 2013.
