= Beatrice Lanzi =

American politician (born 1966)

Member of the Rhode Island Senate from the 26th district
- In office January 7, 2003 – January 1, 2013
- Preceded by: Dennis Algiere
- Succeeded by: Frank Lombardi

Member of the Rhode Island House of Representatives from the 22nd district
- In office January 5, 1993 – January 7, 2003
- Preceded by: Michael Zanni
- Succeeded by: Peter Ginaitt

Personal details
- Born: October 3, 1966 (age 59) Providence, Rhode Island
- Party: Democratic

Beatrice Lanzi (born October 3, 1966) is an American politician who served in the Rhode Island House of Representatives from the 22nd district from 1993 to 2003 and in the Rhode Island Senate from the 26th district from 2003 to 2013.
