= Anthony DeLuca II =

American politician

Member of the Rhode Island Senate from the 29th district
- In office January 3, 2023 – January 7, 2025
- Preceded by: Michael McCaffrey
- Succeeded by: Pete Appollonio

Personal details
- Born: January 29, 1982 (age 44) Warwick, Rhode Island, U.S.
- Party: Republican
- Children: 3
- Website: https://delucadistrict29.com/

Anthony Phillip DeLuca II (born January 29, 1982) is an American politician who was a member of the Rhode Island State Senate representing the 29th District since being elected in the 2022 election.

== Early life and education ==
DeLuca graduated from Warwick Veterans High School.

== Political career ==
DeLuca works for Warwick's water department.

DeLuca won his seat in the 2022 Rhode Island Senate election, replacing Michael McCaffrey. As senator, DeLuca was a member of the Senate Committee on Judiciary and Senate Committee. He sponsored a bill to creating a body that would audit government activities for waste, mismanagement, or fraud. DeLuca lost his reelection bid for the 2024 Rhode Island Senate election to Pete Appollonio in an upset.

== Personal life ==
DeLuca has three children.
