= Todd Patalano =

American politician

Member of the Rhode Island Senate from the 26th district
- Incumbent
- Assumed office January 7, 2025
- Preceded by: Frank Lombardi

Personal details
- Party: Democratic

Todd M. Patalano is an American politician who has served since January 2025 as a member of the Rhode Island Senate. He is a major in the Cranston Police Department.
