= Pete Appollonio =

American politician

Member of the Rhode Island Senate from the 29th district
- Incumbent
- Assumed office January 7, 2025
- Preceded by: Anthony DeLuca II

Personal details
- Born: Peter Albert Appollonio Jr. Warwick, Rhode Island, U.S.
- Party: Democratic
- Spouse: Yolanda Castillo
- Education: Rhode Island College (BA)
- Occupation: Substitute teacher; police officer; politician

Peter Albert Appollonio Jr. is an American politician who has served since January 2025 as a member of the Rhode Island Senate, representing a portion of the city of Warwick, Rhode Island. A member of the Democratic Party, he was elected in 2024, defeating one-term incumbent Anthony DeLuca II, a Republican, by a margin of 44 votes.

Appollonio was born and raised in Warwick and attended local schools, including Warwick Veterans High School. He graduated from Rhode Island College with a degree in criminal justice and was an officer of the West Warwick Police Department for 24 years, eventually reaching the rank of captain before his retirement in 2017. He lives with his wife, Yolanda, in the Conimicut neighborhood of Warwick and worked as a substitute teacher before his election.
