= Adam Satchell =

American politician

Member of the Rhode Island Senate from the 9th district
- In office January 2013 – January 5, 2021
- Preceded by: Michael Pinga
- Succeeded by: John Burke

Personal details
- Born: 1981 (age 44–45) Rhode Island, U.S.
- Party: Democratic
- Children: 1
- Education: Merrimack College (BA); Rhode Island College (MA)
- Website: satchellforsenate.com

Adam J. Satchell is an American politician and educator who served as a Democratic member of the Rhode Island Senate for the 9th district from January 2013 until 2021.

== Early life and education ==
Satchell was born and raised in Rhode Island. He attended, and graduated from, West Warwick High School in 1999. He earned his Bachelor of Arts in psychology from Merrimack College and his Master of Arts from Rhode Island College.

== Elections ==
- 2012 Satchell challenged District 9 incumbent Senator Michael Pinga in the September 11, 2012 Democratic Primary, winning with 1,151 votes (58.0%), and won the November 6, 2012 General election with 6,618 votes (65.4%) against Republican nominee Paul Caianiello, who had run for the seat in 2008.
- Satchel did not seek re-election in 2020.

== Current life ==
In 2022, Satchell served as the dean of students at West Warwick High School.
