= Linda Ujifusa =

American politician

Member of the Rhode Island Senate from the 11th district
- Incumbent
- Assumed office January 3, 2023
- Preceded by: James Seveney

Personal details
- Born: San Jose, California, U.S.
- Party: Democratic
- Spouse: J. Mark Ryan
- Children: 3
- Education: Harvard University (AB); New York University (JD)

Linda L. Ujifusa is an American attorney and politician serving as a member of the Rhode Island Senate for the 11th district. Elected in November 2022, she assumed office on January 3, 2023.

== Early life and education ==
A third-generation Japanese-American, Ujifusa was born and raised in San Jose, California, where she graduated from Abraham Lincoln High School. She earned a scholarship from the Japanese American Citizens League in 1976 and then earned a Bachelor of Arts degree from Harvard University and a Juris Doctor from the New York University School of Law.

== Career ==
Prior to entering politics, Ujifusa worked as an attorney at Mintz Levin and the United States Environmental Protection Agency. She also taught legal writing courses at the University of California, Hastings College of the Law. Ujifusa became involved in politics during the Bernie Sanders 2016 presidential campaign and later served as a member of the Portsmouth Town Council from 2018 to 2022. She was elected to the Rhode Island Senate in November 2022.
