= Cynthia Armour Coyne =

American politician

Cindy Coyne

Member of the Rhode Island Senate from the 32nd district
- In office January 2014 – January 2023
- Preceded by: David Bates
- Succeeded by: Pamela Lauria

Personal details
- Born: November 8, 1961 (age 64)
- Party: Democratic
- Spouse: Jerry Coyne
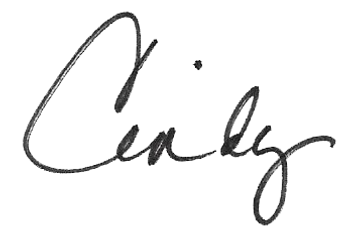
- Signature
- Website: Campaign website

Cynthia Armour Coyne (born November 8, 1961) is an American politician who served as a Democratic member of the Rhode Island Senate representing District 32 from January 2013 to January 2023. She was a Rhode Island State Trooper and reached the rank of lieutenant before her retirement in 2006. Before she was elected to the state's Senate, she was on the Barrington Town Council.
