= Matthew LaMountain =

American attorney

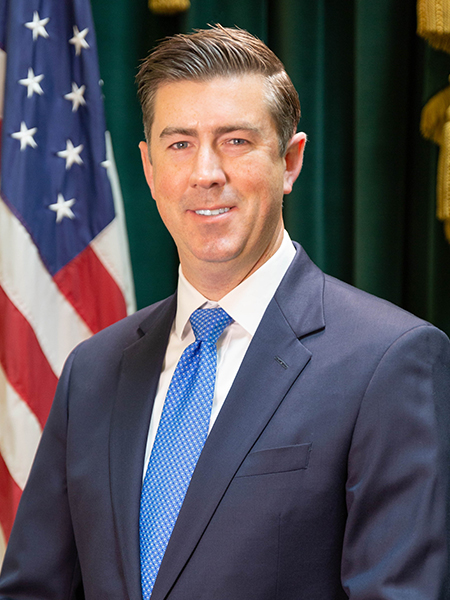

Member of the Rhode Island Senate from the 31st district
- Incumbent
- Assumed office January 3, 2023
- Preceded by: Kendra Anderson

Personal details
- Party: Democratic
- Children: 2
- Education: Salve Regina University (BA); Suffolk University (JD)

Matthew L. LaMountain is an American attorney and politician serving as a member of the Rhode Island Senate for the 31st district. Elected in November 2022, he assumed office on January 3, 2023.

== Early life and education ==
LaMountain is a native of Rhode Island. His mother was a substitute teacher and his father worked for the United Parcel Service. LaMountain graduated from Mount Saint Charles Academy in 2003. He earned a Bachelor of Arts degree in administration of justice from Salve Regina University in 2007 and a Juris Doctor from the Suffolk University Law School in 2010.

== Career ==
LaMountain served as a prosecutor in the Rhode Island Attorney General's Office from 2011 to 2019, specializing in cybercrime and digital evidence. From 2019 to 2021, he served as assistant city solicitor for the Warwick, Rhode Island. LaMountain also operates an independent legal practice, specializing in criminal defense litigation. He was elected to the Rhode Island Senate in November 2022.
