= Pamela J. Lauria =

American politician

Pamela Lauria

Member of the Rhode Island Senate from the 32 district
- Incumbent
- Assumed office January 3, 2023
- Preceded by: Cynthia Armour Coyne

Personal details
- Born: February 18, 1970 (age 56)
- Party: Democratic
- Spouse: David Lauria
- Education: University of Rhode Island
- Website: https://www.rilegislature.gov/senators/lauria/Pages/Biography.aspx

Pamela Lauria is an American politician from East Providence, Rhode Island.

== Early life and education ==
Lauria was born on February 18, 1970, in East Providence, Rhode Island. In 1988 she graduated from St. Mary's Academy-Bay View, an all-girls Catholic school in East Providence, Rhode Island. She attended the University of Rhode Island and earned a BS in Nursing in 1992.

Lauria then started her nursing career at Rhode Island Hospital where she worked until 1997, when she earned her Master of Science in Nursing from the University of Rhode Island. After earning her Masters she started working in private practice as a primary care nurse practitioner at Coastal Medical, where she has been for over 25 years.

== Political career ==
Lauria's first foray into politics came in 2016, when she ran unsuccessfully for the Barrington, Rhode Island School Committee. She was then appointed Co-Chair of the Barrington Democratic Town Committee, a position she held until 2023.

In 2022, Lauria was elected to the Rhode Island Senate, defeating her Republican opponent by 15%. She ran unopposed in 2024 and won re-election to a second term.

== Electoral history ==
General election for Barrington School Committee, 2016
| Party | Candidate | Votes | % |
|---|---|---|---|
| Democratic | Anna S. Clancy | 5,767 | 27.2 |
| Democratic | Megan P. Douglas | 5,245 | 24.7% |
| Independent | Gina M. Pine | 5,026 | 23.7% |
| Democratic | Pamela J. Lauria | 4,971 | 23.4 |

Democratic primary for Rhode Island State Senate District 32, 2022
| Party | Candidate | Votes | % |
|---|---|---|---|
| Democratic | Pamela Lauria | 3,067 | 74.3% |
| Democratic | Susannah Holloway | 1,038 | 25.3% |

General election for Rhode Island State Senate District 32, 2022
| Party | Candidate | Votes | % |
|---|---|---|---|
| Democratic | Pamela Lauria | 8,218 | 62.0% |
| Republican | Rhonda Holmes | 5,017 | 37.8% |
| Other | Write in | 30 | 0.2% |

Democratic primary for Rhode Island State Senate District 32, 2024
| Party | Candidate | Votes | % |
|---|---|---|---|
| Democratic | Pamela J. Lauria | 2,046 | 100 |

General election for Rhode Island State Senate District 32, 2024
| Party | Candidate | Votes | % |
|---|---|---|---|
| Democratic | Pamela J. Lauria | 13,072 | 95.3 |
| Other | Write-in | 642 | 4.7 |
