= Michael McCaffrey =

American politician (born 1963)

Mike McCaffrey

Majority Leader of the Rhode Island Senate
- In office March 23, 2017 – January 3, 2023
- Preceded by: Dominick J. Ruggerio
- Succeeded by: Ryan W. Pearson

Member of the Rhode Island Senate from the 29th district
- In office January 7, 2003 – January 3, 2023
- Preceded by: John J. Tassoni, Jr.
- Succeeded by: Anthony DeLuca II

Member of the Rhode Island Senate from the 16th district
- In office January 3, 1995 – January 7, 2003
- Preceded by: Joseph McGair
- Succeeded by: Daniel Issa

Personal details
- Born: December 18, 1963 (age 62) Providence, Rhode Island, U.S.
- Party: Democratic
- Education: Providence College (BS); Suffolk University (JD)

Michael J. McCaffrey (born December 18, 1963) is an American politician, judge, and a Democratic member of the Rhode Island Senate who represented District 29 from 2003 to 2023. He was the Rhode Island Senate Majority Leader from 2017 to 2023. McCaffrey served consecutively from January 1995 until January 2003 in the District 16 seat.

== Early life and education ==
McCaffrey was born December 18, 1963, in Providence, Rhode Island. He earned his BS in accounting from Providence College and his JD from Suffolk University Law School.

== Political career ==
When District 16 incumbent senator Joseph McGair left the Legislature and left the seat open, McCaffrey won the September 13, 1994, Democratic Primary and won the November 8, 1994, General election with 4,923 votes (57.6%) against Republican nominee Thomas Stone. McCaffrey was unopposed for the September 10, 1996, Democratic Primary, winning with 1,564 votes, and won the November 5, 1996, General election with 6,411 votes (78.8%) against Republican nominee Ernest Young.

McCaffrey was unopposed for both the September 15, 1998, Democratic Primary, winning with 1,087 votes, and the November 3, 1998, General election, winning with 5,711 votes. Two years later, McCaffrey was unopposed for the September 12, 2000, Democratic Primary, winning with 1,786 votes, and won the November 7, 2000, General election with 6,476 votes (76.5%) against Republican nominee Saleh Shahid.

Redistricted to District 29, McCaffrey was unopposed for both the September 10, 2002, Democratic Primary, winning with 2,025 votes, and the November 5, 2002, General election, winning with 8,100 votes. McCaffrey was unopposed for both the September 14, 2004, Democratic Primary, winning with 609 votes, and the November 2, 2004, General election, winning with 9,141 votes.

McCaffrey was unopposed for both the September 12, 2006, Democratic Primary, winning with 1,760 votes, and the November 7, 2006, General election, winning with 9,383 votes. He was also unopposed for both the September 9, 2008, Democratic Primary, winning with 939 votes, and the November 4, 2008, General election, winning with 9,740 votes. McCaffrey was unopposed for both the September 23, 2010, Democratic Primary, winning with 1,652 votes, and the November 2, 2010, General election, winning with 7,600 votes. He was challenged in the September 11, 2012, Democratic Primary, winning with 1,831 votes (53.3%), and was unopposed for the November 6, 2012, General election, winning with 10,149 votes.

Utah State Senate
Preceded by Dominick J. Ruggerio	Majority Leader of the Rhode Island Senate; 2017–2023	Succeeded by Ryan W. Pearson
