= David Tikoian =

American politician and police chief

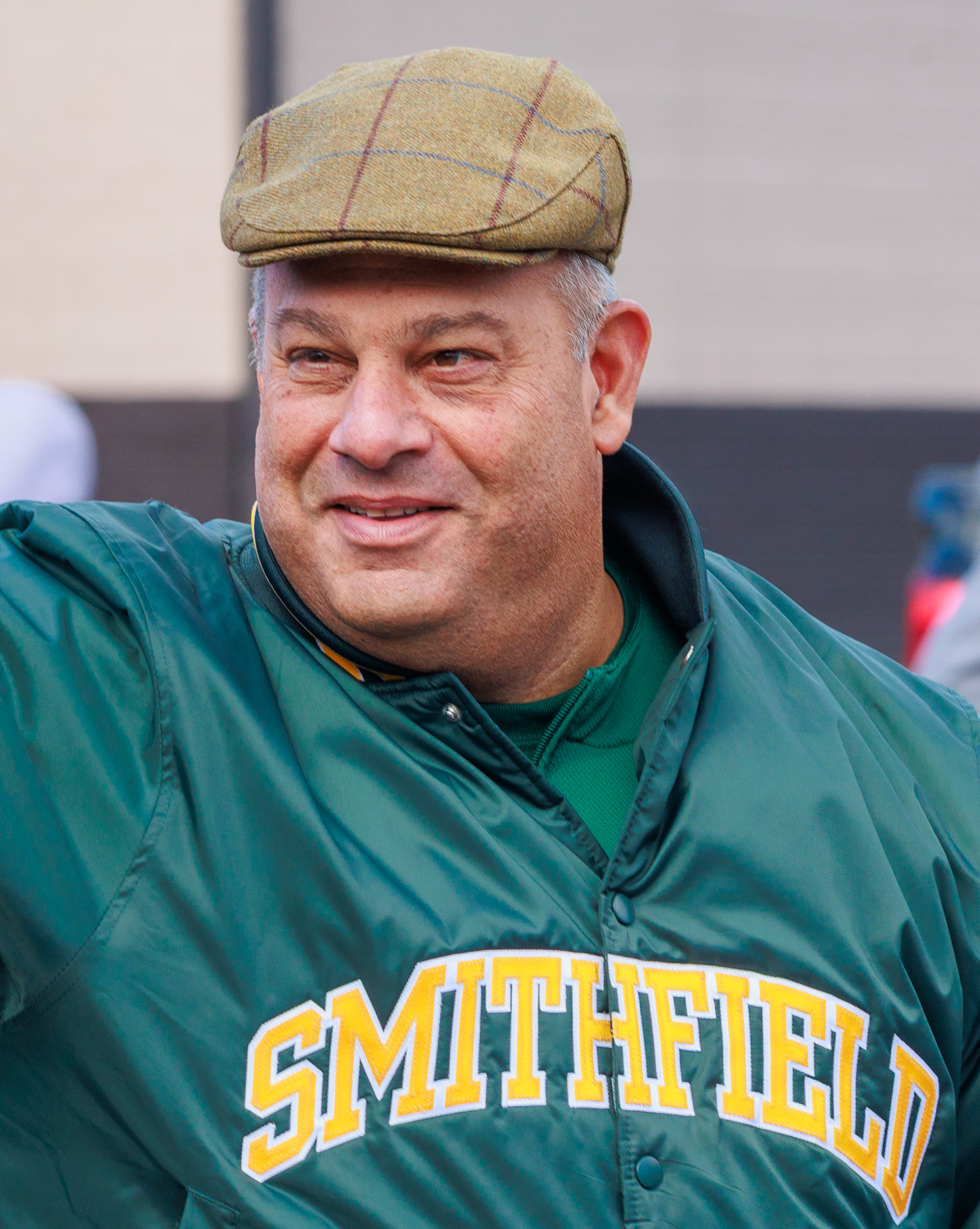
- Tikoian in 2025

Member of the Rhode Island Senate from the 22nd district
- Incumbent
- Assumed office January 3rd, 2023
- Preceded by: Stephen Archambault

Personal details
- Born: July 9, 1968 (age 58) Smithfield, Rhode Island
- Party: Democratic
- Education: Community College of Rhode Island and Bryant University
- Profession: Police Major
- Website: https://www.rilegislature.gov/senators/tikoian/Pages/Biography.aspx

David P. Tikoian is an Armenian-American politician and retired police chief from Smithfield, Rhode Island.

== Early life and education ==
Tikoian was born in Smithfield, Rhode Island on July 9, 1968. In 1986 he graduated from Smithfield High School. After high school he obtained an associates degree from the Community College of Rhode Island in 1988, and in 1990 he graduated from Bryant University with a BS in Business Administration. He finished his education two years later in 1992 after completing his training at the Rhode Island State Police Academy.

== Career ==
Tikoian had a long career with the Rhode Island State Police spanning 25 years. In his first 22 years in the force he worked his way to becoming a Major where he oversaw a budget of nearly 100 million dollars. After which he was appointed as Police Chief of North Providence where he turned the department around earning it an accreditation

In 2020 Tikoian Started his political career when he ran for election on the Smithfield Town Council. Tikoian won his bid and served a 2 year term on the Council. After his time on the Town Council Tikoian decided to continue his political career by running for the 22nd district's seat in the Rhode Island Senate. Tikoian successfully won his bid by a margin of 800 votes, and started his 4 year term on January 3, 2023.

== Electoral history ==
Smithfield Town Council Elections, 2020
Party	Candidate	Votes	%
Democratic	David Tikoian	5,862	12.6%
Democratic	Suzanna Alba	5,574	12.0%
Democratic	Sean Kilduff	5,049	10.9%
Democratic	T. Michael Lawton	4,934	10.6%
Democratic	Angelica Bovis	4,587	9.9%
Republican	Marina Emin	4,535	9.7%
Republican	Philip Hirons Jr	4,412	9.5%
Republican	Rosanne Morales	3,992	8.6%
Republican	James Archer	3,989	8.6%
Republican	Zofia Grzegorzewska	3,509	7.5%
Other	Write-in	75	0.2%

Rhode Island State Senate: District 22 Democratic Primary, 2022
Party	Candidate	Votes	%
Democratic	David Tikoian	1,879	63.9%
Democratic	Melanie Dupont	1,060	36.1%

Rhode Island State Senate: District 22 Democratic Primary, 2022
Party	Candidate	Votes	%
Democratic	David Tikoian	5,869	53.5%
Republican	Paul Santucci	5,081	46.3%
Other	Write-in	30	0.3%
