= Sam Zurier =

American attorney and politician

Member of the Rhode Island Senate from the 3rd district
- Incumbent
- Assumed office November 16, 2021
- Preceded by: Gayle Goldin

Personal details
- Born: Samuel D. Zurier Pawtucket, Rhode Island, U.S.
- Education: Yale University (BA, JD); University of Oxford (MA)

Samuel D. "Sam" Zurier is an American attorney and politician serving as a member of the Rhode Island Senate for the 3rd district. He assumed office on November 16, 2021.

== Early life and education ==
Zurier was born in Pawtucket, Rhode Island, and raised in the East Side neighborhood of Providence. He graduated from Classical High School in 1976. Zurier earned a Bachelor of Arts degree in mathematics from Yale University, a Master of Arts in economics and politics from the University of Oxford, and a Juris Doctor from Yale Law School.

== Career ==
From 1986 to 1988, Zurier clerked for Judges Rya W. Zobel and Stephen Breyer. From 1988 to 1990, he served as an assistant attorney general in the Environmental Protection Division of the Massachusetts Attorney General's Office. He was also an adjunct law professor at the Roger Williams University School of Law. Zurier was elected to the Providence City Council in 2010 and served until 2018. Zurier is of counsel at Oliverio & Marcaccio LLP and founded his own law firm in 2014. He was elected to the Rhode Island Senate in 2021.
