= Meghan Kallman =

American politician (born 1983)

Member of the Rhode Island Senate from the 15th district
- Incumbent
- Assumed office January 5, 2021
- Preceded by: Donna Nesselbush

Personal details
- Born: Meghan Elizabeth Kallman; November 18, 1983 (age 42)
- Party: Democratic
- Education: Smith College (BA); University of Chicago (MA); Brown University (PhD)

Meghan Elizabeth Kallman (born November 18, 1983) is an American politician, award-winning academic, and activist serving as a member of the Rhode Island Senate from the 15th district. Elected in November 2020, she assumed office on January 5, 2021.

== Education ==
Kallman earned a Bachelor of Science degree from Smith College, a Master of Arts from the University of Chicago, and a PhD from Brown University. Kallman's scholarship focuses on development sociology, environmental sociology, and organizational sociology.

== Career ==
Kallman began her career at Amnesty International, and then was a marketing manager for Prize4Life. From 2008 to 2011, she was the research director for Urban Innovation Analysis, a 501(c) organization. From 2014 to 2018, she was an instructor at the Community College of Rhode Island. From 2017 to 2021, she served as a member of the Pawtucket City Council. She is an associate professor at the University of Massachusetts Boston at the graduate School for Global Inclusion and Social Development, and an adjunct professor at Brown University. In 2015, Kallman co-founded Conceivable Future, a nonprofit organization that advocates for climate and reproductive justice.

Representing District 15, Kallman was elected to the Rhode Island Senate in November 2020 and assumed office on January 5, 2021. She is also vice chair of the Senate Housing and Municipal Government Committee. In 2021, the Women Legislators' Lobby awarded Kallman the Pacesetter Award for her actions bringing federal funding back to the people she represents. In 2023, Kallman was awarded the Environmental Champion by Clean Water Action for her efforts towards environment and climate protection.

== Personal ==
She is Jewish. She owns a black and white cat.

== Bibliography (selected) ==
- Kallman, Meghan Elizabeth, and Josephine Ferorelli. 2024. The Conceivable Future: Planning Families and Taking Action in the Age of Climate Change. Rowman & Littlefield.
- Malin, Stephanie A., and Meghan Elizabeth Kallman. 2022. Building Something Better: Environmental Crises and the Promise of Community Change. New Brunswick, New Jersey: Rutgers University Press.
- Kallman, Meghan Elizabeth. 2020. The Death of Idealism: Development and Anti-Politics in the Peace Corps. Columbia University Press.
- Kallman, Meghan Elizabeth, and Terry Clark. 2016. The Third Sector: Community Organizations, NGOs, and Nonprofits. Urbana: University of Illinois Press.
