= V. Susan Sosnowski =

American politician

Sue Sosnowski
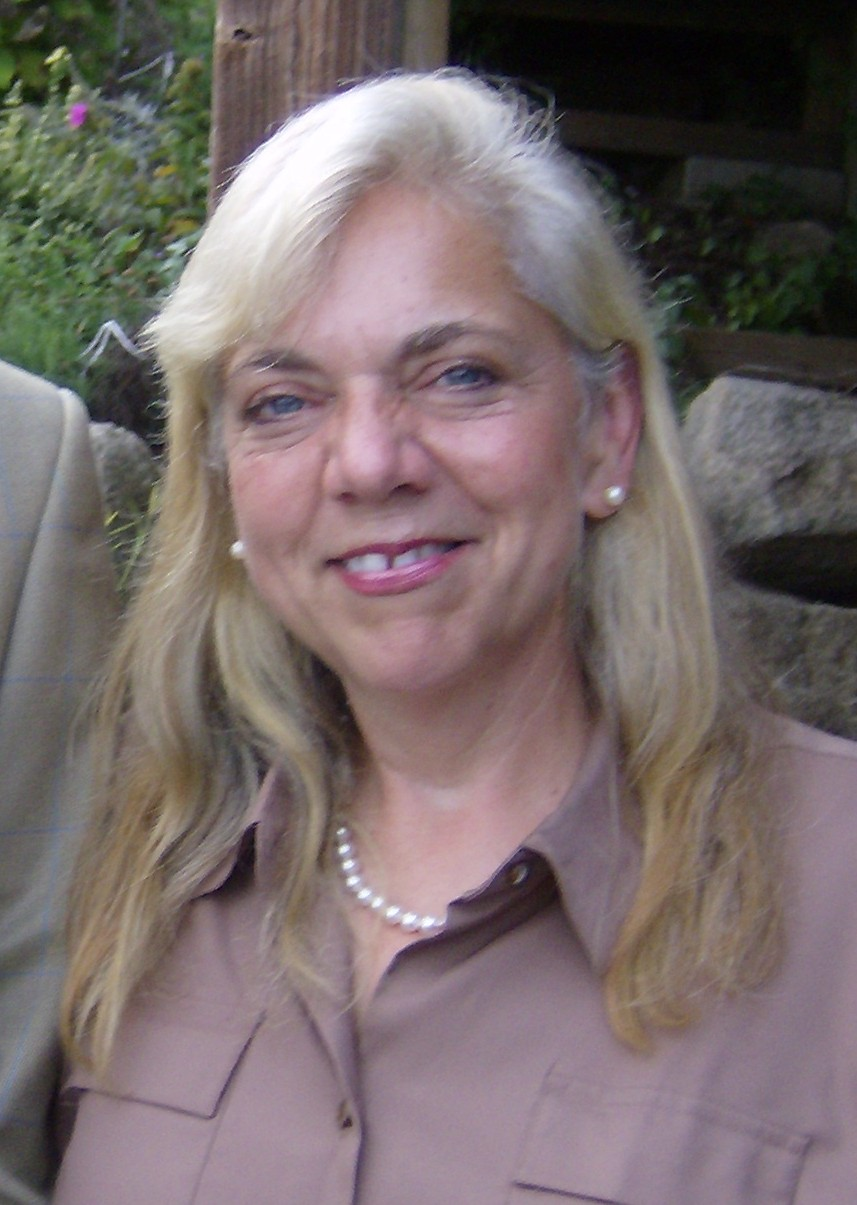

Member of the Rhode Island Senate from the 37th district
- Incumbent
- Assumed office January 7, 2003
- Preceded by: Joseph A. Montalbano

Member of the Rhode Island Senate from the 6th district
- In office January 7, 1997 – January 7, 2003
- Preceded by: Edward F. Holland
- Succeeded by: Dominick Ruggerio

Personal details
- Born: December 20, 1955 (age 70) Warwick, Rhode Island
- Party: Democratic (1998-present)
- Other political affiliations: Republican (before 1998)
- Spouse: Michael Sosnowski
- Children: 4
- Education: Chariho Regional High School (1973), Ocean State Business Institute (1982)
- Profession: Self Employed Farmer, Sosnowski Farms

Virginia Susan Sosnowski (born December 20, 1955) is an American politician who is a Democratic member of the Rhode Island Senate, representing the 37th District, which encompasses the towns of South Kingstown and New Shoreham. She is the owner and operator of Sosnowski Farms, a family farm in West Kingston. Sosnowski was first elected on November 5, 1996, and is serving in her 15th term.

== Education and early career ==
Sosnowski was born Virginia Susan Arnold on December 20, 1955, to Herbert L. Arnold and Virginia (King) Arnold and received her diploma from Chariho High School in 1973. She went on to receive an associate degree from the Ocean State Business Institute in 1982. Sosnowski worked in retail sales at Fleming's Department Store in the village of Wyoming, Rhode Island from 1980 to 1984. She then worked as a sod harvester for Green Valley Turf Farm from 1984 to 1988, and as a manager/supervisor for Laurel Brook Farm from 1984 to 1990. Along with her husband Michael, she has been co-owner/operator of Sosnowski Farms since 1984. Prior to election to the Senate, she served six years as an appointed member on the Planning Board of the Town of South Kingstown.

== Political career ==
Sosnowski was first elected to the Rhode Island Senate as a Republican on November 5, 1996, to the 6th district, defeating first-term incumbent Democrat Edward F. Holland by a margin of 55% to 45%. A dispute with Republican Party leadership led her to join the Democratic Party during the 1998 session, then running as a Democrat during the 1998 election she defeated Republican challenger Martha A. Stamp by a margin of 73% to 27%. Upon downsizing of the Senate from 50 to 38 members in the 2002 election, Sosnowski defeated Republican Challenger Anna F. Prager by a margin of 63% to 37% and elected to serve in the 37th District. Sosnowski was reelected on November 2, 2010, defeating Independent challenger Kevin R. O'Neill by a margin of 51.4% to 48.9%.

From 2001 to 2007, Sosnowski was the senate appointee to the Rhode Island Coastal Resources Management Council. From 2007 to 2010, she served as Rhode Island's Legislative Commissioner to the Atlantic States Marine Fisheries Commission. She is currently serving as Chairwoman of the Senate Committee on Environment & Agriculture, and serves as a member on the Senate Committee on Finance, Senate Committee on Government Oversight and Senate Committee on Health & Human Services.

== Proposed legislation ==
Sosnowski has backed amending the "good time" law, a "law that allows convicted criminals early release for good behavior." This would specifically prohibit "several offenses from being eligible for time off for good behavior, including murder, kidnapping of a minor, first-degree sexual assault and first- or second-degree child molestation." Her amendment passed the Rhode Island State Senate with a vote of 32–2 in May 2011. In February 2012, the bill headed to the State House of Representatives. If approved, it would take effect starting July 1, 2012. A March 2012 article by WPRO/630 mentions that the legislation is "in response to the planned early release of a man who killed a 5-year-old boy and kept his shellacked bones for years."

Sosnowski, along with Senators Louis DiPalma, Juan Pichardo, John J. Tassoni, and Walter Felag, proposed Senate bill S2755 on March 8, 2012. Released in connection with House bill H7933, the Senate bill would bring relief to uninsured children with disabilities that are not eligible for Medicaid because of income. The National Health Interview Survey (NHIS) revealed that 8 percent of children in the U.S. have significant disabilities. Many families of these children are forced to remain low-income in order to qualify for healthcare for their children. Sosnowski's Senate bill S2755 aims to ensure that families would be able to access the Medicaid buy-in regardless of income.

== Personal life ==
Susan and her husband Michael Sosnowski have four children. Her and Michael's family farm uses organic farming techniques. Groups that she is involved in include: Northeast Organic Farming Association, Richmond Grange, South Kingstown Farmer's Market Association, Wakefield Rotary, and RI Nursery and Landscape Association.
