= Alana DiMario =

American politician and mental health councilor

Member of the Rhode Island Senate from the 36th district
- Incumbent
- Assumed office January 5, 2021
- Preceded by: James Sheehan

Personal details
- Born: September 23, 1978 (age 47)
- Party: Democratic
- Education: Wells College (BA); Bridgewater State University (MS)

Alana M. DiMario (born September 23, 1978) is an American politician and mental health counselor serving as a member of the Rhode Island Senate from the 36th district. Elected in November 2020, she assumed office on January 5, 2021.

== Education ==
DiMario earned a Bachelor of Arts degree in psychology from Wells College and a Master of Science in clinical psychology from Bridgewater State University.

== Career ==
Outside of politics, DiMario works as a licensed mental health counselor in private practice. She was an unsuccessful candidate for the Rhode Island Senate in 2018. She ran again in 2020 and assumed office on January 5, 2021.

DiMario serves as vice chair of the Senate Environment and Agriculture Committee and co-chair of the Permanent Joint Legislative Commission on Child Care. She has introduced legislation to prohibit the production and sale of force-fed foie gras due to animal cruelty concerns.

== Personal life ==
DiMario grew up in Bridgewater, Massachusetts.
