= John Burke (Rhode Island politician) =

American politician

Member of the Rhode Island Senate from the 9th district
- Incumbent
- Assumed office January 5, 2021
- Preceded by: Adam Satchell

Personal details
- Born: July 31, 1960 (age 65) West Warwick, Rhode Island, U.S.
- Party: Democratic
- Children: 1
- Education: Community College of Rhode Island (AS)

John P. Burke (born July 31, 1960) is an American politician serving as a member of the Rhode Island Senate from the 9th district. Elected in November 2020, he assumed office on January 5, 2021.

== Early life and education ==
A native of West Warwick, Rhode Island, Burke graduated from Bishop Hendricken High School in 1978. He earned an associate degree in computer science from the Community College of Rhode Island.

== Career ==
Burke worked as a computer operator for Puritan Life Insurance before joining the University of Rhode Island in 1982. At URI, Burke worked as a programmer and database technician before retiring in 2021. He was elected to the Rhode Island Senate in November 2020 and assumed office in January 2021.
