= James Seveney =

US Senator for Rhode Island

James Seveney is a politician from Rhode Island. He is a state senator representing the Bristol, Portsmouth, and Tiverton area, which is the 11th district. He is a member of the Democratic Party.

== Early life ==
Seveney was born in Rhode Island. He attended Rhode Island College for his bachelor's degree and Naval Postgraduate School for his master's degree. Seveney's father, Gardner "Scuppy" Seveney, served in the Rhode Island Senate from 1978 to 1986.

Seveney was a naval officer for 21 years. He specialized in aerospace engineering and defense systems acquisition. Following his naval career, Seveney worked as a defense consultant.

== Political career ==
Seveney served on the Portsmouth School Committee from 2000 to 2004. In 2004 he ran for Portsmouth Town Council, serving as both the council president and vice-president. He won serving until 2016, where he announced his campaign for Rhode Island State Senate. He has been serving in the state legislature since 2016.

In the legislature, Seveney has been active on substance abuse-related issues, especially involving educating young people. In 2019, Seveney proposed a $300 fine for those pulled over for driving under the influence and refuse to take a Breathalyzer test. Seveney has also advocated for more funding toward mental health and suicide prevention, especially with veteran populations.

== Personal life ==
Seveney has been married to his wife Val for over 40 years. The two met while both were students at Rhode Island College. They have two children.
