= Bridget Valverde =

American politician

Member of the Rhode Island Senate from the 35th district
- Incumbent
- Assumed office January 1, 2019
- Preceded by: Mark Gee

Personal details
- Born: October 23, 1982 (age 44)
- Party: Democratic
- Spouse: Will Valverde
- Children: 2
- Education: George Washington University

Bridget G. Valverde is a Democratic member of the Rhode Island Senate, representing District 35 since January 1, 2019. Valverde won election to a Republican-held seat in the Rhode Island Senate on November 6, 2018. On the same day that Valverde was elected to the Rhode Island Senate for the first time, American women were elected in record-breaking numbers to the United States Congress and to state legislative chambers nationwide.

== Early life, education, and family ==
State Senator Bridget Valverde was born on October 23, 1982. She earned a Bachelor of Arts from George Washington University in 2004 and served as the Vice Chairwoman of the Rhode Island Democratic Party Women's Caucus prior to her election to the Rhode Island Senate in 2018. Valverde is married and has two children.

Valverde had a long history of Democratic activism prior to her first run for political office in 2018, including canvassing for her mother's school board campaign in Connecticut to fundraising for the San Francisco Food Bank and testifying in favor of the Reproductive Health Care Act before the Rhode Island House Judiciary Committee. She credits the rise in women's political groups and activism that emerged following Donald Trump's election to the presidency for inspiring her to seek elective office herself.

== Rhode Island Senate ==
Valverde was sworn in for her first term on January 1, 2019. She represents portions of North Kingstown, South Kingstown, Narragansett, and East Greenwich.

She serves on the Senate Committee on Environment and Agriculture and the Senate Committee on Health and Human Services.

== Electoral history ==
On November 6, 2018, Valverde won election to the open District 35 seat in the Rhode Island Senate by a margin of 53.9 percent to 46 percent for the Republican candidate. The 35th Senate district, which includes areas of North Kingstown, South Kingstown, Narragansett, and East Greenwich, had not been won by a Democrat since 2008. Two Republicans, Dawson Tucker Hodgson and Mark Gee, subsequently held the seat from 2011 to 2015 and 2015 to 2019, respectively. In the 2018 general election, Valverde defeated candidate Dana Gee, the wife of the retiring incumbent, by about 1,000 votes, performing an unusual red-to-blue flip in the Ocean State.

Rhode Island State Senate: District 35 Democratic Primary Election, 2018
Party	Candidate	Votes	%
Democratic	Bridget G. Valverde	2,737	84.4
Democratic	Gregory J. Acciardo	507	15.6

Rhode Island State Senate: District 35 General Election, 2018
Party	Candidate	Votes	%
Democratic	Bridget G. Valverde	7,136	53.9
Republican	Dana W. Gee	6,097	46.0
