= Melissa Murray (politician) =

American politician

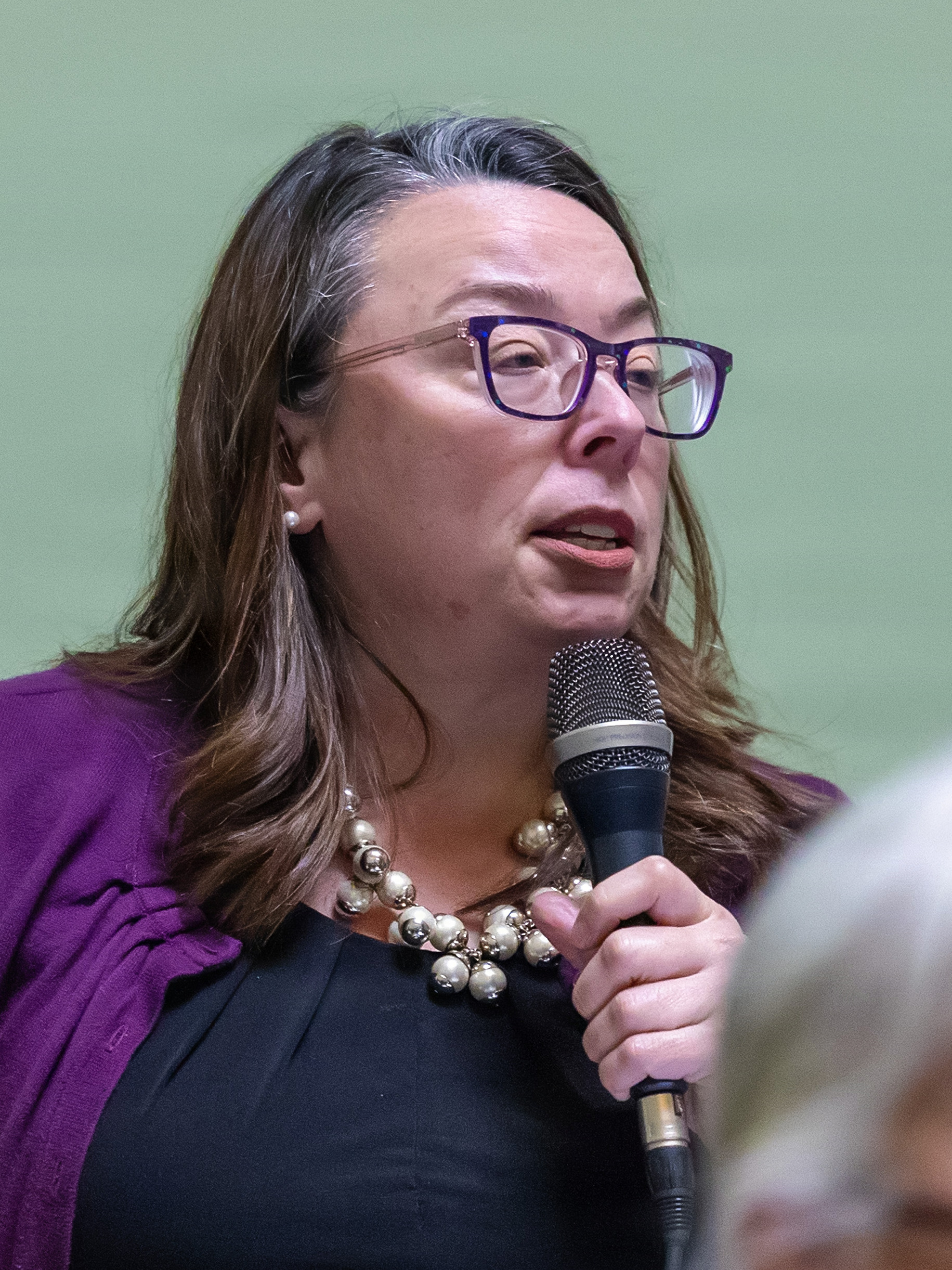

Member of the Rhode Island Senate from the 24th district
- Incumbent
- Assumed office January 1, 2019
- Preceded by: Marc Cote

Personal details
- Born: October 3, 1974 (age 51)
- Party: Democratic
- Profession: artist
- Website: https://www.murrayforri.com

Melissa Murray (born October 3, 1974) is an American politician and a Democratic member of the Rhode Island Senate representing District 24 since January 2019. She is the First Vice Chair of the Senate Committee on Finance, a member of the Senate Committee on Labor, and a member of the Permanent Joint Committee on State Lottery. She was on the Woonsocket City Council for two terms from 2013 to 2018.
