= Ryan W. Pearson =

American politician

Ryan Pearson
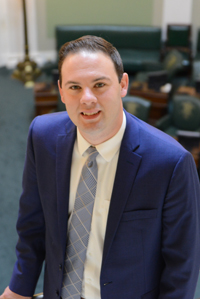

Majority Leader of the Rhode Island Senate
- In office January 3, 2023 – January 7, 2025
- Preceded by: Michael McCaffrey
- Succeeded by: Valarie Lawson

Member of the Rhode Island Senate from the 19th district
- Incumbent
- Assumed office January 1, 2013
- Preceded by: Bethany Moura

Personal details
- Born: June 30, 1988 (age 38) Providence, Rhode Island, U.S.
- Party: Democratic
- Education: American University (attended); Providence College (BS)
- Website: Campaign website

Ryan W. Pearson (born June 30, 1988) is an American businessman and politician from Cumberland, Rhode Island. A Democrat, he serves in the Rhode Island Senate, representing the 19th district. He took office on January 1, 2013, and was named Chairman of the Senate Committee on Finance in January 2021. He previously served as Senior Deputy Majority Leader from 2018–2021.

== Early life and education ==
Pearson was born June 30, 1988, in Providence, Rhode Island. His mother, Deborah Kent an office assistant, and his father, Douglas Pearson a painter.

He was raised in Cumberland graduating from Cumberland High School where he served as Student Government President. As a high school student he led the student government in several community initiatives including overseeing an elementary school reading program he continues to sponsor today. He also was part of the Save our Schools organization that lobbied for local voters to approve a successful $30 million school construction bond question to renovate Cumberland High School. CHS had become under warning to lose its accreditation after years of maintenance neglect at the school.

After graduating Cumberland High School in 2006, Pearson moved to Washington, D.C. and attended American University studying for a degree in finance while working in the United States Senate as a staff assistant to U.S. Senator Sheldon Whitehouse.

In 2008, after a series of controversies on the local school committee at home in Cumberland, Pearson moved back to Rhode Island and announced his run for the Cumberland School Committee. Ultimately, he was successful in his run removing an eighteen year incumbent after campaigning to oversee the construction projects, improve teacher quality and ensure fiscal stability for the district.

Pearson graduated from Providence College with a B.S. in finance in 2010.

== Rhode Island Senate (since 2012) ==
On May 18, 2012, Pearson declared his candidacy for the 19th district seat in the Rhode Island Senate as a Democrat. Incumbent Bethany Moura, a Republican also later announced she would be running for re-election. James Spooner (Democrat) and Steve Orsini (Independent) also announced for the seat. Pearson went on to win the Democratic primary with 68% of the vote and despite competing in a three-person race, won 54% of the general election vote on November 6, 2012.

In 2016, Pearson was challenged by Republican Billy Charette defeating him with 55.5% of the vote. Challenged again by Charette in 2018, Pearson again defeated him with 59.2% of the vote.

Taking office in 2013, he currently serves as Chairman of the Senate Committee on Finance. He also serves as a member of the Senate Education Committee. He previously served as the Senior Deputy Majority Leader and Chairman of the Senate Finance Sub-Committee on Education, Commerce and Municipal Aid.

Prior to serving in the Senate, the Senator served locally on the Cumberland School Committee.

Senator Pearson's first involvement was as part of a student organization called Save Our Schools seeking to rally support behind a bond referendum to improve Cumberland High School which was on the verge of losing accreditation due to severe facility deficiencies. Following the passage of the bond he sought his first office on the Cumberland School Committee in 2008 and has kept school facilities a key priority of his work each year to make sure that every student in Rhode Island has a school to attend. This work culminated in to leading a Senate task force on school construction that served as the foundation of a partnership with Gov. Gina Raimondo and Treasurer Seth Magaziner to pass a comprehensive $1 billion statewide plan to fix and build schools all across Rhode Island.

Senator Pearson has also worked to secure passage of RhodeWorks, invest in Quonset and support the Rhode Island Infrastructure Bank in its efforts to ensure clean water, renewable energy and local road improvement.

The Senator has also focused efforts on education partnering with Education Chairwoman Hanna Gallo to spearhead a series of education reforms in 2019 related to curriculum and school/district accountability. He also chaired a 2020 Senate task force examining the successes and opportunities to the now decade old education funding formula. This remains a priority for the current legislative session to enact the task force recommendations in to law ensuring equitable funding for all students across Rhode Island.

Utah State Senate
Preceded by Michael McCaffrey	Majority Leader of the Rhode Island Senate; 2023–2025	Succeeded by Valarie Lawson
