= Frank Lombardi =

American politician

Member of the Rhode Island Senate from the 26th district
- Incumbent
- Assumed office January 2013
- Preceded by: Beatrice Lanzi

Personal details
- Born: July 11, 1962 (age 64) Providence, Rhode Island, U.S.
- Party: Democratic
- Education: Providence College (BA); Northeastern University School of Law (JD)

Frank Lombardi (born in Providence, Rhode Island) is an American politician and a Democratic member of the Rhode Island Senate representing District 26 since January 2013.

== Education ==
Lombardi earned his BA in business from Providence College and his JD from Northeastern University School of Law.

== Elections ==
- 2012 When District 26 Democratic Senator Beatrice Lanzi retired and left the seat open, Lombardi ran in the September 11, 2012 Democratic Primary, winning with 1,061 votes (73.7%), and was unopposed for the November 6, 2012 General election, winning with 7,009 votes (63.3%) against Republican nominee Sean Gately.
