= Walter Felag =

American politician

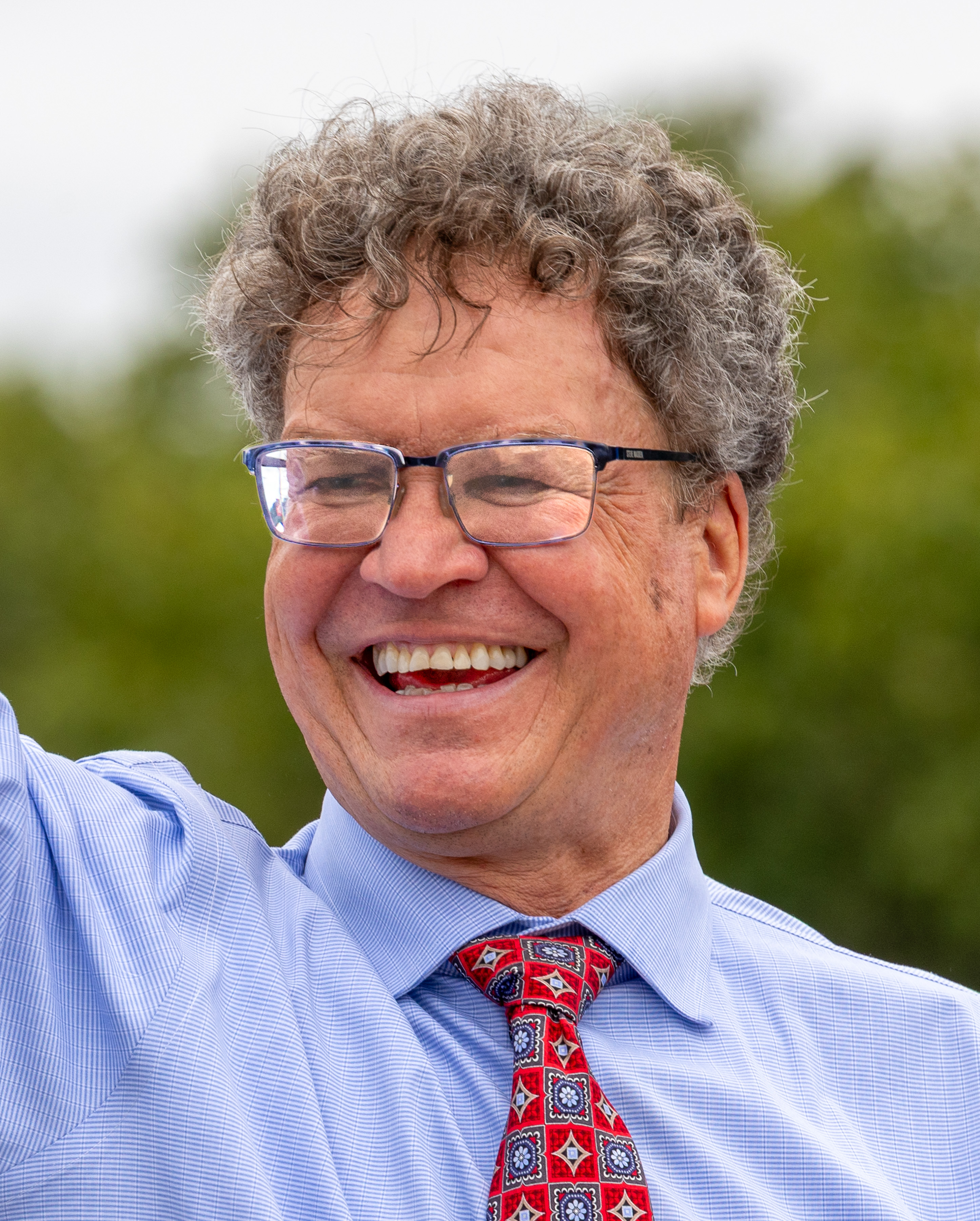
- Felag in 2021

Member of the Rhode Island Senate from the 10th district
- Incumbent
- Assumed office January 2003
- Preceded by: Robert Kells

Member of the Rhode Island Senate from the 46th district
- In office January 1999 – January 2003
- Preceded by: Karen Nygaard
- Succeeded by: District abolished

Personal details
- Born: February 15, 1954 (age 72) Fall River, Massachusetts
- Party: Democratic
- Education: Providence College

Walter S. Felag, Jr. (born February 15, 1954, in Fall River, Massachusetts) is an American politician and a Democratic member of the Rhode Island Senate representing District 10 since January 2003. Felag served consecutively from January 1999 until January 2003 in the District 46 seat.

== Education ==
Felag earned his BA in mathematics from Providence College.

== Elections ==
- 2012 Felag was unopposed for the September 11, 2012 Democratic Primary, winning with 1,263 votes, and the November 6, 2012 General election, winning with 9,602 votes.
- 1998 Felag challenged District 46 incumbent Senator Karen Nygaard in the September 15, 1998 Democratic Primary, winning with 1,215 votes (67.2%), and was unopposed for the November 3, 1998 General election, winning with 4,787 votes.
- 2000 Felag was unopposed for both the September 12, 2000 Democratic Primary, winning with 747 votes, and the November 7, 2000 General election, winning with 6,486 votes.
- 2002 Redistricted to District 10, and with incumbent Democratic Senator Robert Kells retiring, Felag was unopposed for both the September 10, 2002 Democratic Primary, winning with 1,254 votes, and the November 5, 2002 General election, winning with 6,634 votes.
- 2004 Felag was unopposed for both the September 14, 2004 Democratic Primary, winning with 914 votes, and the November 2, 2004 General election, winning with 8,717 votes.
- 2006 Felag was unopposed for both the September 12, 2006 Democratic Primary, winning with 1,232 votes, and the November 7, 2006 General election, winning with 8,397 votes.
- 2008 Felag was unopposed for both the September 9, 2008 Democratic Primary, winning with 407 votes, and the November 4, 2008 General election, winning with 9,307 votes.
- 2010 Felag was unopposed for the September 23, 2010 Democratic Primary, winning with 1,638 votes, and won the November 2, 2010 General election with 6,126 votes (66.0%) against Republican nominee Virginia Butterworth.
