= Rhode Island Senate =

Upper house of the Rhode Island General Assembly

Coordinates: 41.8310574°N 71.4171443°W

- Seal of the Rhode Island Senate

Type
- Type: Upper house of the Rhode Island General Assembly
- Term limits: None

History
- New session started: January 7, 2025

Leadership
- President: Valarie Lawson (D) since April 29, 2025
- President pro tempore: Hanna Gallo (D) since January 5, 2021
- Majority Leader: Frank Ciccone (D) since April 29, 2025
- Minority Leader: Jessica de la Cruz (R) since August 2, 2022

Structure
- Seats: 38
- Political groups: Majority (34): Democratic (34); Minority (4): Republican (4)
- Length of term: 2 years
- Authority: Article VI, Constitution of Rhode Island
- Salary: $19,036/year

Elections
- Voting system: First-past-the-post
- Last election: November 5, 2024
- Next election: November 3, 2026
- Redistricting: Legislative Control

Meeting place
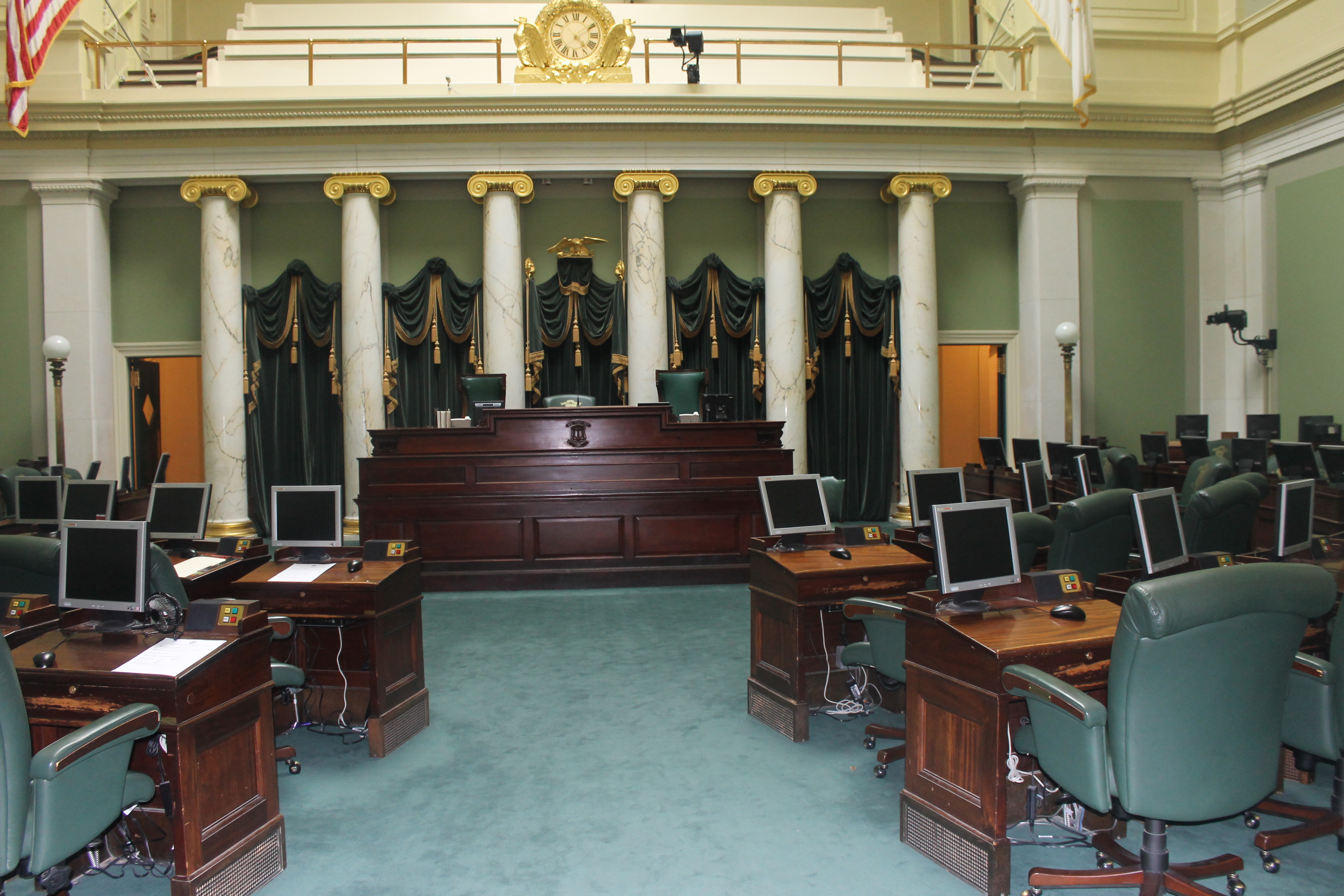
- Senate Chamber; Rhode Island State Capitol; Providence, Rhode Island

Website
- Rhode Island Senate

District map with municipalities

The Rhode Island Senate is the upper house of the Rhode Island General Assembly, the state legislature of the U.S. state of Rhode Island, the lower house being the Rhode Island House of Representatives. It is composed of 38 Senators, each of whom is elected to a two-year term. Rhode Island is one of the 14 states where its upper house serves at a two-year cycle, rather than the normal four-year term as in most states. There is no limit to the number of terms that a Senator may serve. The Rhode Island Senate meets at the Rhode Island State Capitol in Providence.

Like other upper houses of state and territorial legislatures and the federal U.S. Senate, the Senate can confirm or reject gubernatorial appointments to executive departments, commissions and boards and Justices to the Rhode Island Judiciary.

== Senate leadership ==
The President of the Senate presides over the body, appointing members to all of the Senate's committees and joint committees, and may create other committees and subcommittees if desired. Unlike most other states, the Lieutenant Governor of Rhode Island does not preside over the Senate, and is instead active in other areas such as state commissions on health and businesses. In the Senate President's absence, the President Pro Tempore presides.

=== Democratic leadership ===
- Valarie Lawson (D) - President of the Senate
- Frank Ciccone (D) – Majority Leader
- David Tikoian (D) – Majority Whip

=== Republican leadership ===
- Jessica de la Cruz (R) – Minority Leader
- Gordon Rogers (R) – Minority Whip

== Committees ==
Committee	Chair
Artificial Intelligence and Emerging Technologies	Victoria Gu (D)
Commerce	Robert Britto (D)
Education	Hanna Gallo (D)
Environment and Agriculture	V. Susan Sosnowski (D)
Finance	Louis DiPalma (D)
Health and Human Services	Melissa Murray (D)
Housing and Municipal Government	Jake Bissaillon (D)
Judiciary	Matthew LaMountain (D)
Labor and Gaming	John Burke (D)
Rules, Government Ethics and Oversight	Mark McKenney (D)
Special Legislation and Veterans' Affairs	Walter Felag (D)

== Make-up of the Senate ==
2025–2027 Legislative Session

Affiliation	Party (Shading indicates majority caucus)			Total	Vacant
Affiliation	Democratic	Republican	Independent	Total	Vacant
2011-2012	29	8	1	38	0
2013-2014	32	5	1	38	0
Begin 2015	32	5	1	38	0
2015-2016	33	5	0	38	0
Begin 2017	33	5	0	38	0
2017-2019	32	5	0	38	1
Begin 2019	33	5	0	38	0
Begin 2023	33	5	0	38	0
Begin 2025	34	4	0	38	0
April 21, 2025 (Note: Democratic Senate President Dominick J. Ruggerio (District 4) died April 21, 2025.)	33	4	0	37	1
August 5, 2025 (Note: Democrat Stefano Famiglietti elected to succeed Ruggerio.)	34	4	0	38	0
Latest voting share	89.5%	10.5%			

=== Members of the Rhode Island Senate ===
District	Name	Party	Municipalities	Counties	Start
1	Jake Bissaillon	Dem	Providence	Providence	2023 (Note: First elected in a special election.)
2	Ana Quezada	Dem	Providence	Providence	2016
3	Sam Zurier	Dem	Providence	Providence	2021
4	Stefano Famiglietti	Dem	Providence, North Providence	Providence	2025
5	Sam Bell	Dem	Providence	Providence	2018
6	Tiara Mack	Dem	Providence	Providence	2020
7	Frank Ciccone	Dem	Johnston, Providence	Providence	2002
8	Lori Urso	Dem	Pawtucket	Providence	2024
9	John Burke	Dem	West Warwick	Kent	2020
10	Walter Felag	Dem	Bristol, Tiverton, Warren	Bristol, Newport	1998
11	Linda Ujifusa	Dem	Bristol, Portsmouth	Bristol, Newport	2022
12	Louis DiPalma	Dem	Little Compton, Middletown, Newport, Tiverton	Newport	2008
13	Dawn Euer	Dem	Newport, Jamestown	Newport	2017
14	Valarie Lawson	Dem	East Providence	Providence	2018
15	Meghan Kallman	Dem	Pawtucket, Providence	Providence	2020
16	Jonathon Acosta	Dem	Central Falls, Pawtucket	Providence	2020
17	Thomas Paolino	Rep	Lincoln, North Providence, North Smithfield	Providence	2016
18	Robert Britto	Dem	East Providence, Pawtucket	Providence	2022
19	Ryan W. Pearson	Dem	Cumberland, Lincoln	Providence	2012
20	Brian Thompson	Dem	Woonsocket, Cumberland	Providence	2024
21	Gordon Rogers	Rep	Coventry, Foster, Scituate, West Greenwich	Kent, Providence	2018
22	David Tikoian	Dem	Smithfield, Lincoln, North Providence	Providence	2022
23	Jessica de la Cruz	Rep	Burrillville, Glocester, North Smithfield	Providence	2018
24	Melissa Murray	Dem	North Smithfield, Woonsocket	Providence	2018
25	Andrew Dimitri	Dem	Johnston	Providence	2024
26	Todd Patalano	Dem	Cranston	Providence	2024
27	Hanna Gallo	Dem	Cranston, West Warwick	Kent, Providence	1998
28	Lammis Vargas	Dem	Cranston, Providence	Providence	2024
29	Pete Appollonio	Dem	Warwick	Kent	2024
30	Mark McKenney	Dem	Warwick	Kent	2018
31	Matthew LaMountain	Dem	Cranston, Warwick	Kent, Providence	2022
32	Pamela J. Lauria	Dem	Barrington, Bristol, East Providence	Bristol	2022
33	Leonidas Raptakis (Note: Raptakis previously served in the state senate from 1996–2010.)	Dem	Coventry, West Greenwich	Kent	2012
34	Elaine J. Morgan	Rep	Charlestown, Exeter, Hopkinton, Richmond, West Greenwich	Kent, Washington	2014
35	Bridget Valverde	Dem	East Greenwich, North Kingstown, Narragansett, South Kingstown	Kent, Washington	2018
36	Alana DiMario	Dem	Narragansett, New Shoreham, North Kingstown	Washington	2020
37	V. Susan Sosnowski	Dem	South Kingstown	Washington	1996
38	Victoria Gu	Dem	Charlestown, South Kingstown, Westerly	Washington	2022

== See also ==
- Rhode Island State Capitol
- Rhode Island General Assembly
- Rhode Island House of Representatives
- List of Rhode Island General Assemblies
