= 2022 Rhode Island House of Representatives election =

- November 8, 2022

All 75 seats in the Rhode Island House of Representatives 38 seats needed for a majority
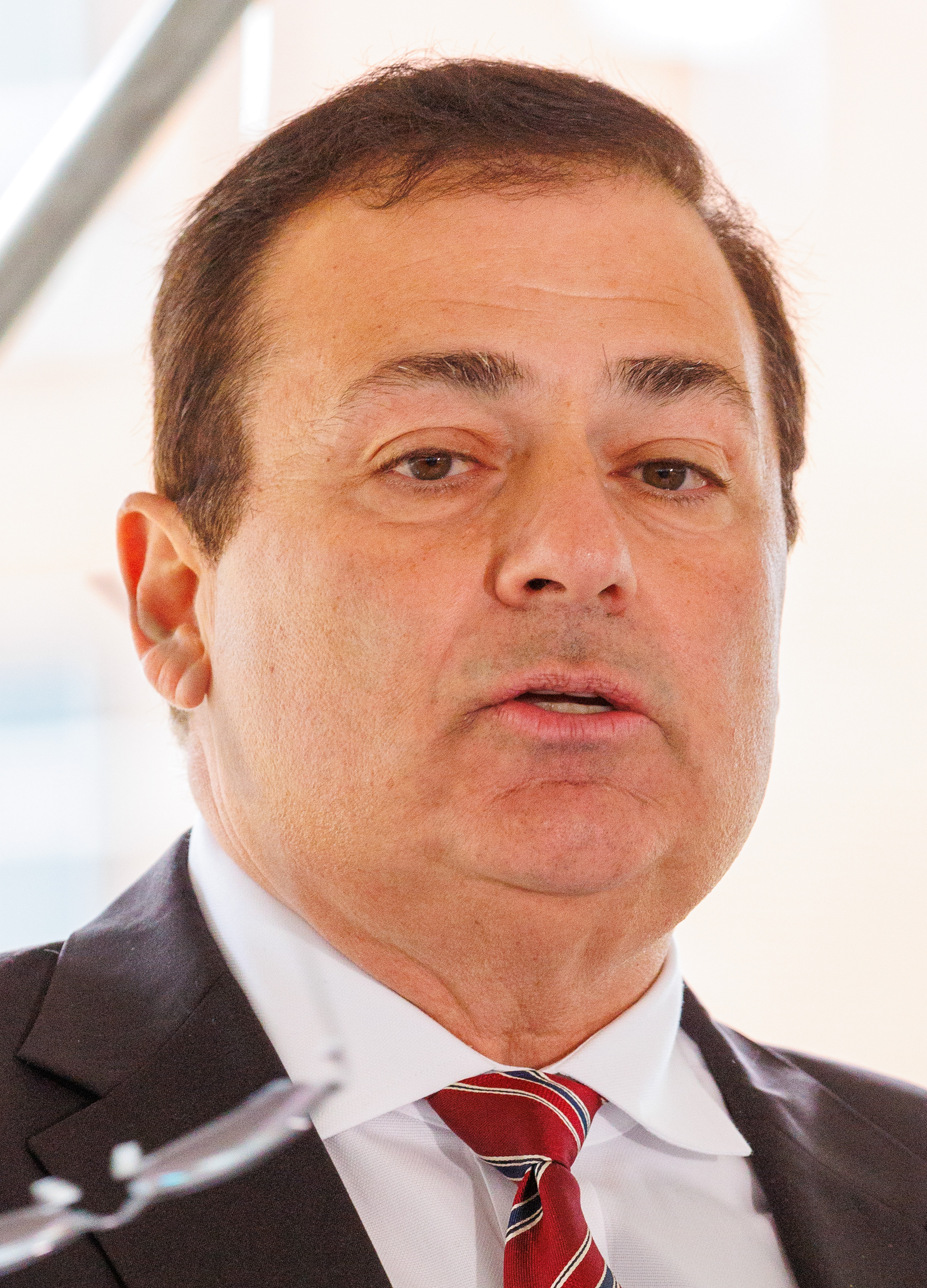

| | Majority party | Minority party | Third party |
|---|---|---|---|
| Leader | Joe Shekarchi | Michael Chippendale |
| Party | Democratic | Republican | Independent |
| Leader since | January 5, 2021 | June 23, 2022 |
| Leader's seat | 23rd | 40th |
| Seats before | 65 | 10 | 0 |
| Seats after | 65 | 9 | 1 |
| Seat change | Steady | ▼1 | ▲1 |
| Popular vote | 212,251 | 99,003 | 16,502 |
| Percentage | 63.77% | 29.74% | 4.96% |
- Results: Democratic hold Democratic gain Republican hold Republican gain Independent gain
Speaker before election
Joe Shekarchi
Democratic
Elected Speaker
Joe Shekarchi
Democratic

The 2022 Rhode Island House of Representatives elections took place on November 8, 2022. Primary elections were held on September 13, 2022. Rhode Island voters elected state representatives in all 75 seats of the House of Representatives to serve two-year terms.

The election coincided with United States national elections and Rhode Island state elections, including U.S. House, Governor, and Rhode Island Senate. Since the previous election in 2020, Democrats held a 65-to-10-seat supermajority over Republicans. Democrats maintained the supermajority in 2022, winning 65 seats. Republicans decreased to nine seats while Jon D. Brien was the sole Independent elected.

These were the first elections in Rhode Island following the 2020 United States redistricting cycle, which resulted in redrawn legislative district boundaries.

== Predictions ==
| Source | Ranking | As of |
|---|---|---|
| Sabato's Crystal Ball | Safe D | May 19, 2022 |

== Retirements ==
- District 5: Marcia Ranglin-Vassell (D) was succeeded by Anthony DeSimone (D).
- District 36: Blake Filippi (R) was succeeded by Tina Spears (D). (Democratic gain)
- District 49: Steven Lima (D) was succeeded by Jon D. Brien (Independent). (Independent gain)
- District 58: Carlos Tobon (D) was succeeded by Cherie Cruz (D).
- District 65: Gregg Amore (D) was succeeded by Matthew Dawson (D).
- District 66: Liana Cassar (D) was succeeded by Jennifer Boylan (D).
- District 74: Deb Ruggiero (D) was succeeded by Alex Finkelman (D).

== Incumbents defeated ==
=== Defeated in primary election ===
- District 9: Anastasia Williams (D) was defeated by Enrique Sanchez (D).
- District 57: James N. McLaughlin (D) was defeated by Brandon Voas (D).
- District 59: Jean Philippe Barros (D) was defeated by Jennifer Stewart (D).

=== Defeated in general election ===
- District 39: Justin K. Price (R) was defeated by Megan Cotter (D).
- District 53: Bernard Hawkins (D) was defeated by Brian Rea (R).

== Summary of results by House of Representatives district ==
Italics denote an open seat held by the incumbent party; bold text denotes a gain for a party.

| House District | Incumbent | Party | Elected Representative | Party |
|---|---|---|---|---|
| 1 | Edith Ajello | Dem | Edith Ajello | Dem |
| 2 | Christopher Blazejewski | Dem | Christopher Blazejewski | Dem |
| 3 | Nathan Biah | Dem | Nathan Biah | Dem |
| 4 | Rebecca Kislak | Dem | Rebecca Kislak | Dem |
| 5 | Marcia Ranglin-Vassell | Dem | Anthony DeSimone | Dem |
| 6 | Raymond Hull | Dem | Raymond Hull | Dem |
| 7 | David Morales | Dem | David Morales | Dem |
| 8 | John J. Lombardi | Dem | John J. Lombardi | Dem |
| 9 | Anastasia P. Williams | Dem | Enrique Sanchez | Dem |
| 10 | Scott A. Slater | Dem | Scott A. Slater | Dem |
| 11 | Grace Diaz | Dem | Grace Diaz | Dem |
| 12 | Jose Batista | Dem | Jose Batista | Dem |
| 13 | Ramon Perez | Dem | Ramon Perez | Dem |
| 14 | Charlene Lima | Dem | Charlene Lima | Dem |
| 15 | Barbara Ann Fenton-Fung | Rep | Barbara Ann Fenton-Fung | Rep |
| 16 | Brandon Potter | Dem | Brandon Potter | Dem |
| 17 | Jacquelyn Baginski | Dem | Jacquelyn Baginski | Dem |
| 18 | Arthur Handy | Dem | Arthur Handy | Dem |
| 19 | Joseph McNamara | Dem | Joseph McNamara | Dem |
| 20 | David Bennett | Dem | David Bennett | Dem |
| 21 | Camille Vella-Wilkinson | Dem | Camille Vella-Wilkinson | Dem |
| 22 | Joseph J. Solomon Jr. | Dem | Joseph J. Solomon Jr. | Dem |
| 23 | Joe Shekarchi | Dem | Joe Shekarchi | Dem |
| 24 | Evan Shanley | Dem | Evan Shanley | Dem |
| 25 | Thomas Noret | Dem | Thomas Noret | Dem |
| 26 | Patricia Morgan | Rep | Patricia Morgan | Rep |
| 27 | Patricia Serpa | Dem | Patricia Serpa | Dem |
| 28 | George Nardone | Rep | George Nardone | Rep |
| 29 | Sherry Roberts | Rep | Sherry Roberts | Rep |
| 30 | Justine Caldwell | Dem | Justine Caldwell | Dem |
| 31 | Julie Casimiro | Dem | Julie Casimiro | Dem |
| 32 | Robert Craven | Dem | Robert Craven | Dem |
| 33 | Carol McEntee | Dem | Carol McEntee | Dem |
| 34 | Teresa Tanzi | Dem | Teresa Tanzi | Dem |
| 35 | Kathleen A. Fogarty | Dem | Kathleen A. Fogarty | Dem |
| 36 | Blake Filippi | Rep | **Tina Spears** | **Dem** |
| 37 | Samuel Azzinaro | Dem | Samuel Azzinaro | Dem |
| 38 | Brian Patrick Kennedy | Dem | Brian Patrick Kennedy | Dem |
| 39 | Justin K. Price | Rep | **Megan Cotter** | **Dem** |
| 40 | Michael Chippendale | Rep | Michael Chippendale | Rep |
| 41 | Robert Quattrocchi | Rep | Robert Quattrocchi | Rep |
| 42 | Edward Cardillo | Dem | Edward Cardillo | Dem |
| 43 | Deborah Fellela | Dem | Deborah Fellela | Dem |
| 44 | Gregory Costantino | Dem | Gregory Costantino | Dem |
| 45 | Mia Ackerman | Dem | Mia Ackerman | Dem |
| 46 | Mary Ann Shallcross Smith | Dem | Mary Ann Shallcross Smith | Dem |
| 47 | David Place | Rep | David Place | Rep |
| 48 | Brian Newberry | Rep | Brian Newberry | Rep |
| 49 | Steven Lima | Dem | **Jon D. Brien** | **Ind** |
| 50 | Stephen Casey | Dem | Stephen Casey | Dem |
| 51 | Robert Phillips | Dem | Robert Phillips | Dem |
| 52 | Alex Marszalkowski | Dem | Alex Marszalkowski | Dem |
| 53 | Bernard Hawkins | Dem | **Brian Rea** | **Rep** |
| 54 | William O'Brien | Dem | William O'Brien | Dem |
| 55 | Arthur “Doc” Corvese | Dem | Arthur “Doc” Corvese | Dem |
| 56 | Joshua Giraldo | Dem | Joshua Giraldo | Dem |
| 57 | James N. McLaughlin | Dem | Brandon Voas | Dem |
| 58 | Carlos E. Tobon | Dem | Cherie Cruz | Dem |
| 59 | Jean Philippe Barros | Dem | Jennifer Stewart | Dem |
| 60 | Karen Alzate | Dem | Karen Alzate | Dem |
| 61 | Leonela Felix | Dem | Leonela Felix | Dem |
| 62 | Mary Messier | Dem | Mary Messier | Dem |
| 63 | Katherine Kazarian | Dem | Katherine Kazarian | Dem |
| 64 | Brianna Henries | Dem | Brianna Henries | Dem |
| 65 | Gregg Amore | Dem | Matthew Dawson | Dem |
| 66 | Liana Cassar | Dem | Jennifer Boylan | Dem |
| 67 | Jason Knight | Dem | Jason Knight | Dem |
| 68 | June Speakman | Dem | June Speakman | Dem |
| 69 | Susan R. Donovan | Dem | Susan R. Donovan | Dem |
| 70 | John Edwards | Dem | John Edwards | Dem |
| 71 | Michelle McGaw | Dem | Michelle McGaw | Dem |
| 72 | Terri-Denise Cortvriend | Dem | Terri-Denise Cortvriend | Dem |
| 73 | Marvin Abney | Dem | Marvin Abney | Dem |
| 74 | Deb Ruggiero | Dem | Alex Finkelman | Dem |
| 75 | Lauren H. Carson | Dem | Lauren H. Carson | Dem |

== Detailed Results by House of Representatives District ==
Sources for election results:

=== District 1 ===
Primary Election Results
| Party | Candidate | Votes | % |
Democratic Party Primary Results
| Democratic | Edith Hanover Ajello (incumbent) | 1,552 | 100.00% |
| Total votes | | 1,552 | 100.00% |

General Election Results
| Party | Candidate | Votes | % |
|---|---|---|---|
| Democratic | Edith Hanover Ajello (incumbent) | 2,444 | 88.04% |
| Independent | Thomas Edward O'Connell | 332 | 11.96% |
| Total votes | | 2,776 | 100.00% |
| Democratic hold | | | |

=== District 2 ===
Primary Election Results
| Party | Candidate | Votes | % |
Democratic Party Primary Results
| Democratic | Christopher R. Blazejewski (incumbent) | 1,340 | 73.87% |
| Democratic | Savannah H. DaCruz | 474 | 26.13% |
| Total votes | | 1,814 | 100.00% |

General Election Results
| Party | Candidate | Votes | % |
|---|---|---|---|
| Democratic | Christopher R. Blazejewski (incumbent) | 3,122 | 100.00% |
| Total votes | | 3,122 | 100.00% |
| Democratic hold | | | |

=== District 3 ===
Primary Election Results
| Party | Candidate | Votes | % |
Democratic Party Primary Results
| Democratic | Nathan W. Biah (incumbent) | 719 | 100.00% |
| Total votes | | 719 | 100.00% |

General Election Results
| Party | Candidate | Votes | % |
|---|---|---|---|
| Democratic | Nathan W. Biah (incumbent) | 1,428 | 100.00% |
| Total votes | | 1,428 | 100.00% |
| Democratic hold | | | |

=== District 4 ===
Primary Election Results
| Party | Candidate | Votes | % |
Democratic Party Primary Results
| Democratic | Rebecca M. Kislak (incumbent) | 3,203 | 100.00% |
| Total votes | | 3,203 | 100.00% |
Republican Party Primary Results
| Republican | Alex W. Cannon | 46 | 100.00% |
| Total votes | | 46 | 100.00% |

General Election Results
| Party | Candidate | Votes | % |
|---|---|---|---|
| Democratic | Rebecca M. Kislak (incumbent) | 5,021 | 88.82% |
| Republican | Alex W. Cannon | 632 | 11.18% |
| Total votes | | 5,653 | 100.00% |
| Democratic hold | | | |

=== District 5 ===
Primary Election Results
| Party | Candidate | Votes | % |
Democratic Party Primary Results
| Democratic | Anthony J. DeSimone | 735 | 52.31% |
| Democratic | Raphael Olawale Okelola | 256 | 18.22% |
| Democratic | Diana Garlington | 218 | 15.52% |
| Democratic | Torlo Kormasa Amos | 196 | 13.95% |
| Total votes | | 1,405 | 100.00% |

General Election Results
| Party | Candidate | Votes | % |
|---|---|---|---|
| Democratic | Anthony J. DeSimone | 1,880 | 80.14% |
| Independent | Stacey Jana Capizzano | 466 | 19.86% |
| Total votes | | 2,346 | 100.00% |
| Democratic hold | | | |

=== District 6 ===
Primary Election Results
| Party | Candidate | Votes | % |
Democratic Party Primary Results
| Democratic | Raymond A. Hull (incumbent) | 1,269 | 60.78% |
| Democratic | Damian A. Lima | 819 | 39.22% |
| Total votes | | 2,088 | 100.00% |

General Election Results
| Party | Candidate | Votes | % |
|---|---|---|---|
| Democratic | Raymond A. Hull (incumbent) | 3,091 | 100.00% |
| Total votes | | 3,091 | 100.00% |
| Democratic hold | | | |

=== District 7 ===
Primary Election Results
| Party | Candidate | Votes | % |
Democratic Party Primary Results
| Democratic | David Morales (incumbent) | 1,469 | 100.00% |
| Total votes | | 1,469 | 100.00% |

General Election Results
| Party | Candidate | Votes | % |
|---|---|---|---|
| Democratic | David Morales (incumbent) | 2,154 | 81.99% |
| Independent | Christopher L. Ireland | 473 | 18.01% |
| Total votes | | 2,627 | 100.00% |
| Democratic hold | | | |

=== District 8 ===
Primary Election Results
| Party | Candidate | Votes | % |
Democratic Party Primary Results
| Democratic | John J. Lombardi (incumbent) | 1,140 | 100.00% |
| Total votes | | 1,140 | 100.00% |

General Election Results
| Party | Candidate | Votes | % |
|---|---|---|---|
| Democratic | John J. Lombardi (incumbent) | 2,216 | 100.00% |
| Total votes | | 2,216 | 100.00% |
| Democratic hold | | | |

=== District 9 ===
Primary Election Results
| Party | Candidate | Votes | % |
Democratic Party Primary Results
| Democratic | Enrique George Sanchez | 802 | 53.57% |
| Democratic | Anastasia P. Williams (incumbent) | 587 | 39.21% |
| Democratic | Lonnie L. Mangum | 108 | 7.21% |
| Total votes | | 1,497 | 100.00% |

General Election Results
| Party | Candidate | Votes | % |
|---|---|---|---|
| Democratic | Enrique George Sanchez | 1,836 | 100.00% |
| Total votes | | 1,836 | 100.00% |
| Democratic hold | | | |

=== District 10 ===
Primary Election Results
| Party | Candidate | Votes | % |
Democratic Party Primary Results
| Democratic | Scott A. Slater (incumbent) | 1,089 | 100.00% |
| Total votes | | 1,089 | 100.00% |

General Election Results
| Party | Candidate | Votes | % |
|---|---|---|---|
| Democratic | Scott A. Slater (incumbent) | 1,628 | 100.00% |
| Total votes | | 1,628 | 100.00% |
| Democratic hold | | | |

=== District 11 ===
Primary Election Results
| Party | Candidate | Votes | % |
Democratic Party Primary Results
| Democratic | Grace Diaz (incumbent) | 1,027 | 65.12% |
| Democratic | Laura Perez | 550 | 34.88% |
| Total votes | | 1,577 | 100.00% |
Republican Party Primary Results
| Republican | Emmanuel C. Nyema | 26 | 100.00% |
| Total votes | | 26 | 100.00% |

General Election Results
| Party | Candidate | Votes | % |
|---|---|---|---|
| Democratic | Grace Diaz (incumbent) | 1,739 | 86.43% |
| Republican | Emmanuel C. Nyema | 273 | 13.57% |
| Total votes | | 2,012 | 100.00% |
| Democratic hold | | | |

=== District 12 ===
Primary Election Results
| Party | Candidate | Votes | % |
Democratic Party Primary Results
| Democratic | Jose F. Batista (incumbent) | 1,046 | 100.00% |
| Total votes | | 1,046 | 100.00% |

General Election Results
| Party | Candidate | Votes | % |
|---|---|---|---|
| Democratic | Jose F. Batista (incumbent) | 1,418 | 100.00% |
| Total votes | | 1,418 | 100.00% |
| Democratic hold | | | |

=== District 13 ===
Primary Election Results
| Party | Candidate | Votes | % |
Democratic Party Primary Results
| Democratic | Ramon A. Perez (incumbent) | 1,090 | 100.00% |
| Total votes | | 1,090 | 100.00% |

General Election Results
| Party | Candidate | Votes | % |
|---|---|---|---|
| Democratic | Ramon A. Perez (incumbent) | 1,376 | 64.48% |
| Independent | Ivan J. Montanez | 758 | 35.52% |
| Total votes | | 2,134 | 100.00% |
| Democratic hold | | | |

=== District 14 ===
Primary Election Results
| Party | Candidate | Votes | % |
Democratic Party Primary Results
| Democratic | Charlene Lima (incumbent) | 557 | 59.13% |
| Democratic | Giona A. Picheco | 385 | 40.87% |
| Total votes | | 942 | 100.00% |

General Election Results
| Party | Candidate | Votes | % |
|---|---|---|---|
| Democratic | Charlene Lima (incumbent) | 2,127 | 100.00% |
| Total votes | | 2,127 | 100.00% |
| Democratic hold | | | |

=== District 15 ===
Primary Election Results
| Party | Candidate | Votes | % |
Republican Party Primary Results
| Republican | Barbara Ann Fenton Fung (incumbent) | 591 | 92.34% |
| Republican | Suzanne Michelle Downing | 49 | 7.66% |
| Total votes | | 640 | 100.00% |

General Election Results
| Party | Candidate | Votes | % |
|---|---|---|---|
| Republican | Barbara Ann Fenton Fung (incumbent) | 4,978 | 100.00% |
| Total votes | | 4,978 | 100.00% |
| Republican hold | | | |

=== District 16 ===
Primary Election Results
| Party | Candidate | Votes | % |
Democratic Party Primary Results
| Democratic | Brandon C. Potter (incumbent) | 960 | 67.32% |
| Democratic | Natalya DelSanto | 466 | 32.68% |
| Total votes | | 1,426 | 100.00% |
Republican Party Primary Results
| Republican | Jason John Klas | 273 | 100.00% |
| Total votes | | 273 | 100.00% |

General Election Results
| Party | Candidate | Votes | % |
|---|---|---|---|
| Democratic | Brandon C. Potter (incumbent) | 2,760 | 58.07% |
| Republican | Jason John Klas | 1,993 | 41.93% |
| Total votes | | 4,753 | 100.00% |
| Democratic hold | | | |

=== District 17 ===
Primary Election Results
| Party | Candidate | Votes | % |
Democratic Party Primary Results
| Democratic | Jacquelyn M. Baginski (incumbent) | 1,077 | 100.00% |
| Total votes | | 1,077 | 100.00% |

General Election Results
| Party | Candidate | Votes | % |
|---|---|---|---|
| Democratic | Jacquelyn M. Baginski (incumbent) | 3,741 | 100.00% |
| Total votes | | 3,741 | 100.00% |
| Democratic hold | | | |

=== District 18 ===
Primary Election Results
| Party | Candidate | Votes | % |
Democratic Party Primary Results
| Democratic | Arthur Handy (incumbent) | 1,156 | 100.00% |
| Total votes | | 1,156 | 100.00% |

General Election Results
| Party | Candidate | Votes | % |
|---|---|---|---|
| Democratic | Arthur Handy (incumbent) | 3,072 | 100.00% |
| Total votes | | 3,072 | 100.00% |
| Democratic hold | | | |

=== District 19 ===
Primary Election Results
| Party | Candidate | Votes | % |
Democratic Party Primary Results
| Democratic | Joseph McNamara (incumbent) | 2,070 | 68.18% |
| Democratic | Stuart A. Wilson | 966 | 31.82% |
| Total votes | | 3,036 | 100.00% |

General Election Results
| Party | Candidate | Votes | % |
|---|---|---|---|
| Democratic | Joseph McNamara (incumbent) | 5,888 | 100.00% |
| Total votes | | 5,888 | 100.00% |
| Democratic hold | | | |

=== District 20 ===
Primary Election Results
| Party | Candidate | Votes | % |
Democratic Party Primary Results
| Democratic | David A. Bennett (incumbent) | 1,284 | 100.00% |
| Total votes | | 1,284 | 100.00% |

General Election Results
| Party | Candidate | Votes | % |
|---|---|---|---|
| Democratic | David A. Bennett (incumbent) | 3,167 | 62.38% |
| Independent | Dan Elliott | 1,910 | 37.62% |
| Total votes | | 5,077 | 100.00% |
| Democratic hold | | | |

=== District 21 ===
Primary Election Results
| Party | Candidate | Votes | % |
Democratic Party Primary Results
| Democratic | Camille F. Vella-Wilkinson (incumbent) | 866 | 51.58% |
| Democratic | Capri C. Catanzaro | 813 | 48.42% |
| Total votes | | 1,679 | 100.00% |
Republican Party Primary Results
| Republican | Marie A. Hopkins | 384 | 100.00% |
| Total votes | | 384 | 100.00% |

General Election Results
| Party | Candidate | Votes | % |
|---|---|---|---|
| Democratic | Camille F. Vella-Wilkinson (incumbent) | 2,618 | 50.37% |
| Republican | Marie A. Hopkins | 2,580 | 49.63% |
| Total votes | | 5,198 | 100.00% |
| Democratic hold | | | |

=== District 22 ===
Primary Election Results
| Party | Candidate | Votes | % |
Democratic Party Primary Results
| Democratic | Joseph J. Solomon, Jr. (incumbent) | 993 | 67.19% |
| Democratic | Zakary J. Pereira | 485 | 32.81% |
| Total votes | | 1,478 | 100.00% |
Republican Party Primary Results
| Republican | David Stone | 344 | 100.00% |
| Total votes | | 344 | 100.00% |

General Election Results
| Party | Candidate | Votes | % |
|---|---|---|---|
| Democratic | Joseph J. Solomon, Jr. (incumbent) | 3,034 | 56.22% |
| Republican | David Stone | 2,363 | 43.78% |
| Total votes | | 5,397 | 100.00% |
| Democratic hold | | | |

=== District 23 ===
Primary Election Results
| Party | Candidate | Votes | % |
Democratic Party Primary Results
| Democratic | K. Joseph Shekarchi (incumbent) | 1,271 | 69.72% |
| Democratic | Jacqueline M. Anderson | 552 | 30.28% |
| Total votes | | 1,823 | 100.00% |
Republican Party Primary Results
| Republican | Dana James Traversie | 359 | 100.00% |
| Total votes | | 359 | 100.00% |

General Election Results
| Party | Candidate | Votes | % |
|---|---|---|---|
| Democratic | K. Joseph Shekarchi (incumbent) | 3,416 | 59.99% |
| Republican | Dana James Traversie | 2,278 | 40.01% |
| Total votes | | 5,694 | 100.00% |
| Democratic hold | | | |

=== District 24 ===
Primary Election Results
| Party | Candidate | Votes | % |
Democratic Party Primary Results
| Democratic | Evan Patrick Shanley (incumbent) | 1,722 | 100.00% |
| Total votes | | 1,722 | 100.00% |

General Election Results
| Party | Candidate | Votes | % |
|---|---|---|---|
| Democratic | Evan Patrick Shanley (incumbent) | 4,364 | 64.91% |
| Independent | Jonathan H. Martin | 2,359 | 35.09% |
| Total votes | | 6,723 | 100.00% |
| Democratic hold | | | |

=== District 25 ===
Primary Election Results
| Party | Candidate | Votes | % |
Democratic Party Primary Results
| Democratic | Thomas E. Noret (incumbent) | 653 | 100.00% |
| Total votes | | 653 | 100.00% |

General Election Results
| Party | Candidate | Votes | % |
|---|---|---|---|
| Democratic | Thomas E. Noret (incumbent) | 2,891 | 100.00% |
| Total votes | | 2,891 | 100.00% |
| Democratic hold | | | |

=== District 26 ===
Primary Election Results
| Party | Candidate | Votes | % |
Republican Party Primary Results
| Republican | Patricia L. Morgan (incumbent) | 380 | 100.00% |
| Total votes | | 380 | 100.00% |
Democratic Party Primary Results
| Democratic | Samara R. Yelle | 825 | 100.00% |
| Total votes | | 825 | 100.00% |

General Election Results
| Party | Candidate | Votes | % |
|---|---|---|---|
| Republican | Patricia L. Morgan (incumbent) | 2,919 | 59.08% |
| Democratic | Samara R. Yelle | 2,022 | 40.92% |
| Total votes | | 4,941 | 100.00% |
| Republican hold | | | |

=== District 27 ===
Primary Election Results
| Party | Candidate | Votes | % |
Democratic Party Primary Results
| Democratic | Patricia A. Serpa (incumbent) | 1,004 | 100.00% |
| Total votes | | 1,004 | 100.00% |
Republican Party Primary Results
| Republican | Andrew N. Kowalski | 377 | 100.00% |
| Total votes | | 377 | 100.00% |

General Election Results
| Party | Candidate | Votes | % |
|---|---|---|---|
| Democratic | Patricia A. Serpa (incumbent) | 3,216 | 58.69% |
| Republican | Andrew N. Kowalski | 2,264 | 41.31% |
| Total votes | | 5,480 | 100.00% |
| Democratic hold | | | |

=== District 28 ===
Primary Election Results
| Party | Candidate | Votes | % |
Republican Party Primary Results
| Republican | George A. Nardone (incumbent) | 423 | 100.00% |
| Total votes | | 423 | 100.00% |
Democratic Party Primary Results
| Democratic | Scott J. Guthrie | 972 | 100.00% |
| Total votes | | 972 | 100.00% |

General Election Results
| Party | Candidate | Votes | % |
|---|---|---|---|
| Republican | George A. Nardone (incumbent) | 3,539 | 58.51% |
| Democratic | Scott J. Guthrie | 2,510 | 41.49% |
| Total votes | | 6,049 | 100.00% |
| Republican hold | | | |

=== District 29 ===
Primary Election Results
| Party | Candidate | Votes | % |
Republican Party Primary Results
| Republican | Sherry L. Roberts (incumbent) | 450 | 100.00% |
| Total votes | | 450 | 100.00% |

General Election Results
| Party | Candidate | Votes | % |
|---|---|---|---|
| Republican | Sherry L. Roberts (incumbent) | 4,489 | 100.00% |
| Total votes | | 4,489 | 100.00% |
| Republican hold | | | |

=== District 30 ===
Primary Election Results
| Party | Candidate | Votes | % |
Democratic Party Primary Results
| Democratic | Justine A. Caldwell (incumbent) | 1,532 | 100.00% |
| Total votes | | 1,532 | 100.00% |
Republican Party Primary Results
| Republican | Amanda M. Blau | 424 | 100.00% |
| Total votes | | 424 | 100.00% |

General Election Results
| Party | Candidate | Votes | % |
|---|---|---|---|
| Democratic | Justine A. Caldwell (incumbent) | 3,665 | 54.60% |
| Republican | Amanda M. Blau | 3,048 | 45.40% |
| Total votes | | 6,713 | 100.00% |
| Democratic hold | | | |

=== District 31 ===
Primary Election Results
| Party | Candidate | Votes | % |
Democratic Party Primary Results
| Democratic | Julie A. Casimiro (incumbent) | 1,130 | 64.79% |
| Democratic | Melissa K. Devine | 614 | 35.21% |
| Total votes | | 1,744 | 100.00% |
Republican Party Primary Results
| Republican | Lisa Marie Leavitt | 403 | 100.00% |
| Total votes | | 403 | 100.00% |

General Election Results
| Party | Candidate | Votes | % |
|---|---|---|---|
| Democratic | Julie A. Casimiro (incumbent) | 3,989 | 59.00% |
| Republican | Lisa Marie Leavitt | 2,772 | 41.00% |
| Total votes | | 6,761 | 100.00% |
| Democratic hold | | | |

=== District 32 ===
Primary Election Results
| Party | Candidate | Votes | % |
Democratic Party Primary Results
| Democratic | Robert E. Craven (incumbent) | 1,314 | 58.95% |
| Democratic | Danielle L. Walsh | 915 | 41.05% |
| Total votes | | 2,229 | 100.00% |
Republican Party Primary Results
| Republican | Ryan J. Hansen | 342 | 100.00% |
| Total votes | | 342 | 100.00% |

General Election Results
| Party | Candidate | Votes | % |
|---|---|---|---|
| Democratic | Robert E. Craven (incumbent) | 4,532 | 64.10% |
| Republican | Ryan J. Hansen | 2,538 | 35.90% |
| Total votes | | 7,070 | 100.00% |
| Democratic hold | | | |

=== District 33 ===
Primary Election Results
| Party | Candidate | Votes | % |
Democratic Party Primary Results
| Democratic | Carol Hagan McEntee (incumbent) | 1,880 | 100.00% |
| Total votes | | 1,880 | 100.00% |
Republican Party Primary Results
| Republican | Jessica A. Drew Day | 312 | 100.00% |
| Total votes | | 312 | 100.00% |

General Election Results
| Party | Candidate | Votes | % |
|---|---|---|---|
| Democratic | Carol Hagan McEntee (incumbent) | 4,258 | 61.18% |
| Republican | Jessica A. Drew Day | 2,702 | 38.82% |
| Total votes | | 6,960 | 100.00% |
| Democratic hold | | | |

=== District 34 ===
Primary Election Results
| Party | Candidate | Votes | % |
Democratic Party Primary Results
| Democratic | Teresa A. Tanzi (incumbent) | 1,600 | 100.00% |
| Total votes | | 1,600 | 100.00% |
Republican Party Primary Results
| Republican | Catherine E. Canavan | 217 | 100.00% |
| Total votes | | 217 | 100.00% |

General Election Results
| Party | Candidate | Votes | % |
|---|---|---|---|
| Democratic | Teresa A. Tanzi (incumbent) | 3,925 | 62.96% |
| Republican | Catherine E. Canavan | 2,309 | 37.04% |
| Total votes | | 6,234 | 100.00% |
| Democratic hold | | | |

=== District 35 ===
Primary Election Results
| Party | Candidate | Votes | % |
Democratic Party Primary Results
| Democratic | Kathleen A. Fogarty (incumbent) | 1,136 | 100.00% |
| Total votes | | 1,136 | 100.00% |
Republican Party Primary Results
| Republican | William R. Paniccia, III | 172 | 100.00% |
| Total votes | | 172 | 100.00% |

General Election Results
| Party | Candidate | Votes | % |
|---|---|---|---|
| Democratic | Kathleen A. Fogarty (incumbent) | 2,879 | 64.36% |
| Republican | William R. Paniccia, III | 1,594 | 35.64% |
| Total votes | | 4,473 | 100.00% |
| Democratic hold | | | |

=== District 36 ===
Primary Election Results
| Party | Candidate | Votes | % |
Republican Party Primary Results
| Republican | John F. Pacheco, III | 373 | 100.00% |
| Total votes | | 373 | 100.00% |
Democratic Party Primary Results
| Democratic | Tina L. Spears | 1,751 | 100.00% |
| Total votes | | 1,751 | 100.00% |

General Election Results
| Party | Candidate | Votes | % |
|---|---|---|---|
| Democratic | Tina L. Spears | 4,730 | 61.61% |
| Republican | John F. Pacheco, III | 2,947 | 38.39% |
| Total votes | | 7,677 | 100.00% |
| Democratic gain from Republican | | | |

=== District 37 ===
Primary Election Results
| Party | Candidate | Votes | % |
Democratic Party Primary Results
| Democratic | Samuel Angelo Azzinaro (incumbent) | 1,190 | 100.00% |
| Total votes | | 1,190 | 100.00% |

General Election Results
| Party | Candidate | Votes | % |
|---|---|---|---|
| Democratic | Samuel Angelo Azzinaro (incumbent) | 4,965 | 100.00% |
| Total votes | | 4,965 | 100.00% |
| Democratic hold | | | |

=== District 38 ===
Primary Election Results
| Party | Candidate | Votes | % |
Democratic Party Primary Results
| Democratic | Brian Patrick Kennedy (incumbent) | 796 | 100.00% |
| Total votes | | 796 | 100.00% |
Republican Party Primary Results
| Republican | Donald J. Kohlman, II | 369 | 100.00% |
| Total votes | | 369 | 100.00% |

General Election Results
| Party | Candidate | Votes | % |
|---|---|---|---|
| Democratic | Brian Patrick Kennedy (incumbent) | 3,174 | 57.97% |
| Republican | Donald J. Kohlman, II | 2,301 | 42.03% |
| Total votes | | 5,475 | 100.00% |
| Democratic hold | | | |

=== District 39 ===
Primary Election Results
| Party | Candidate | Votes | % |
Republican Party Primary Results
| Republican | Justin K. Price (incumbent) | 533 | 100.00% |
| Total votes | | 533 | 100.00% |
Democratic Party Primary Results
| Democratic | Megan L. Cotter | 1,110 | 100.00% |
| Total votes | | 1,110 | 100.00% |

General Election Results
| Party | Candidate | Votes | % |
|---|---|---|---|
| Democratic | Megan L. Cotter | 3,031 | 45.24% |
| Republican | Justin K. Price (incumbent) | 2,999 | 44.76% |
| Independent | Sean Patrick Comella | 670 | 10.00% |
| Total votes | | 6,700 | 100.00% |
| Democratic gain from Republican | | | |

=== District 40 ===
Primary Election Results
| Party | Candidate | Votes | % |
Republican Party Primary Results
| Republican | Michael W. Chippendale (incumbent) | 553 | 100.00% |
| Total votes | | 553 | 100.00% |
Democratic Party Primary Results
| Democratic | Linda A. Nichols | 909 | 100.00% |
| Total votes | | 909 | 100.00% |

General Election Results
| Party | Candidate | Votes | % |
|---|---|---|---|
| Republican | Michael W. Chippendale (incumbent) | 4,368 | 67.44% |
| Democratic | Linda A. Nichols | 2,109 | 32.56% |
| Total votes | | 6,477 | 100.00% |
| Republican hold | | | |

=== District 41 ===
Primary Election Results
| Party | Candidate | Votes | % |
Republican Party Primary Results
| Republican | Robert J. Quattrocchi (incumbent) | 500 | 100.00% |
| Total votes | | 500 | 100.00% |
Democratic Party Primary Results
| Democratic | James S. Safford | 904 | 100.00% |
| Total votes | | 904 | 100.00% |

General Election Results
| Party | Candidate | Votes | % |
|---|---|---|---|
| Republican | Robert J. Quattrocchi (incumbent) | 4,723 | 68.40% |
| Democratic | James S. Safford | 2,182 | 31.60% |
| Total votes | | 6,905 | 100.00% |
| Republican hold | | | |

=== District 42 ===
Primary Election Results
| Party | Candidate | Votes | % |
Democratic Party Primary Results
| Democratic | Edward T. Cardillo, Jr. (incumbent) | 642 | 41.37% |
| Democratic | Kelsey Kristine Coletta | 559 | 36.02% |
| Democratic | Dennis Cardillo, Jr. | 351 | 22.62% |
| Total votes | | 1,552 | 100.00% |
Republican Party Primary Results
| Republican | Harold K. Borders, Jr. | 279 | 100.00% |
| Total votes | | 279 | 100.00% |

General Election Results
| Party | Candidate | Votes | % |
|---|---|---|---|
| Democratic | Edward T. Cardillo, Jr. (incumbent) | 2,650 | 52.45% |
| Republican | Harold K. Borders, Jr. | 2,402 | 47.55% |
| Total votes | | 5,052 | 100.00% |
| Democratic hold | | | |

=== District 43 ===
Primary Election Results
| Party | Candidate | Votes | % |
Democratic Party Primary Results
| Democratic | Deborah Ann Fellela (incumbent) | 1,365 | 100.00% |
| Total votes | | 1,365 | 100.00% |
Republican Party Primary Results
| Republican | Nicola Antonio Grasso | 257 | 100.00% |
| Total votes | | 257 | 100.00% |

General Election Results
| Party | Candidate | Votes | % |
|---|---|---|---|
| Democratic | Deborah Ann Fellela (incumbent) | 2,621 | 51.78% |
| Republican | Nicola Antonio Grasso | 2,441 | 48.22% |
| Total votes | | 5,062 | 100.00% |
| Democratic hold | | | |

=== District 44 ===
Primary Election Results
| Party | Candidate | Votes | % |
Democratic Party Primary Results
| Democratic | Gregory J. Costantino (incumbent) | 1,481 | 100.00% |
| Total votes | | 1,481 | 100.00% |
Republican Party Primary Results
| Republican | Peter Anthony Trementozzi | 398 | 100.00% |
| Total votes | | 398 | 100.00% |

General Election Results
| Party | Candidate | Votes | % |
|---|---|---|---|
| Democratic | Gregory J. Costantino (incumbent) | 3,729 | 54.21% |
| Republican | Peter Anthony Trementozzi | 3,150 | 45.79% |
| Total votes | | 6,879 | 100.00% |
| Democratic hold | | | |

=== District 45 ===
Primary Election Results
| Party | Candidate | Votes | % |
Democratic Party Primary Results
| Democratic | Mia A. Ackerman (incumbent) | 1,208 | 100.00% |
| Total votes | | 1,208 | 100.00% |
Republican Party Primary Results
| Republican | Thomas Alexander Rando | 256 | 100.00% |
| Total votes | | 256 | 100.00% |

General Election Results
| Party | Candidate | Votes | % |
|---|---|---|---|
| Democratic | Mia A. Ackerman (incumbent) | 3,062 | 55.49% |
| Republican | Thomas Alexander Rando | 2,456 | 44.51% |
| Total votes | | 5,518 | 100.00% |
| Democratic hold | | | |

=== District 46 ===
Primary Election Results
| Party | Candidate | Votes | % |
Democratic Party Primary Results
| Democratic | Mary Ann Shallcross Smith (incumbent) | 1,180 | 100.00% |
| Total votes | | 1,180 | 100.00% |

General Election Results
| Party | Candidate | Votes | % |
|---|---|---|---|
| Democratic | Mary Ann Shallcross Smith (incumbent) | 3,449 | 61.37% |
| Independent | Angelo Kapsimalis | 2,171 | 38.63% |
| Total votes | | 5,620 | 100.00% |
| Democratic hold | | | |

=== District 47 ===
Primary Election Results
| Party | Candidate | Votes | % |
Republican Party Primary Results
| Republican | David J. Place (incumbent) | 445 | 100.00% |
| Total votes | | 445 | 100.00% |
Democratic Party Primary Results
| Democratic | Paul A. Roselli | 662 | 100.00% |
| Total votes | | 662 | 100.00% |

General Election Results
| Party | Candidate | Votes | % |
|---|---|---|---|
| Republican | David J. Place (incumbent) | 3,433 | 67.16% |
| Democratic | Paul A. Roselli | 1,679 | 32.84% |
| Total votes | | 5,112 | 100.00% |
| Republican hold | | | |

=== District 48 ===
Primary Election Results
| Party | Candidate | Votes | % |
Republican Party Primary Results
| Republican | Brian C. Newberry (incumbent) | 524 | 100.00% |
| Total votes | | 524 | 100.00% |
Democratic Party Primary Results
| Democratic | Paul M. Jones | 835 | 100.00% |
| Total votes | | 835 | 100.00% |

General Election Results
| Party | Candidate | Votes | % |
|---|---|---|---|
| Republican | Brian C. Newberry (incumbent) | 3,654 | 63.87% |
| Democratic | Paul M. Jones | 2,067 | 36.13% |
| Total votes | | 5,721 | 100.00% |
| Republican hold | | | |

=== District 49 ===
Primary Election Results
| Party | Candidate | Votes | % |
Democratic Party Primary Results
| Democratic | Glenn F. Dusablon | 440 | 57.82% |
| Democratic | Alexander G. Kithes | 321 | 42.18% |
| Total votes | | 761 | 100.00% |

General Election Results
| Party | Candidate | Votes | % |
|---|---|---|---|
| Independent | Jon D. Brien (Note: In 2013, Representative Jon D. Brien left the House, having represented the 50th district as a Democrat. A decade later, in 2022, he was elected back to the chamber as an Independent.) | 1,270 | 50.96% |
| Democratic | Glenn F. Dusablon | 1,222 | 49.04% |
| Total votes | | 2,492 | 100.00% |
| Independent gain from Democratic | | | |

=== District 50 ===
Primary Election Results
| Party | Candidate | Votes | % |
Democratic Party Primary Results
| Democratic | Stephen M. Casey (incumbent) | 547 | 100.00% |
| Total votes | | 547 | 100.00% |

General Election Results
| Party | Candidate | Votes | % |
|---|---|---|---|
| Democratic | Stephen M. Casey (incumbent) | 2,188 | 100.00% |
| Total votes | | 2,188 | 100.00% |
| Democratic hold | | | |

=== District 51 ===
Primary Election Results
| Party | Candidate | Votes | % |
Democratic Party Primary Results
| Democratic | Robert D. Phillips (incumbent) | 517 | 63.13% |
| Democratic | Marlene B. Guay | 302 | 36.87% |
| Total votes | | 819 | 100.00% |

General Election Results
| Party | Candidate | Votes | % |
|---|---|---|---|
| Democratic | Robert D. Phillips (incumbent) | 2,349 | 100.00% |
| Total votes | | 2,349 | 100.00% |
| Democratic hold | | | |

=== District 52 ===
Primary Election Results
| Party | Candidate | Votes | % |
Democratic Party Primary Results
| Democratic | Alex Daniel Marszalkowski (incumbent) | 1,582 | 100.00% |
| Total votes | | 1,582 | 100.00% |
Republican Party Primary Results
| Republican | Christopher J. Hogan | 318 | 100.00% |
| Total votes | | 318 | 100.00% |

General Election Results
| Party | Candidate | Votes | % |
|---|---|---|---|
| Democratic | Alex Daniel Marszalkowski (incumbent) | 3,609 | 56.34% |
| Republican | Christopher J. Hogan | 2,797 | 43.66% |
| Total votes | | 6,406 | 100.00% |
| Democratic hold | | | |

=== District 53 ===
Primary Election Results
| Party | Candidate | Votes | % |
Democratic Party Primary Results
| Democratic | Bernard A. Hawkins (incumbent) | 1,029 | 100.00% |
| Total votes | | 1,029 | 100.00% |
Republican Party Primary Results
| Republican | Brian J. Rea | 341 | 100.00% |
| Total votes | | 341 | 100.00% |

General Election Results
| Party | Candidate | Votes | % |
|---|---|---|---|
| Republican | Brian J. Rea | 2,503 | 50.59% |
| Democratic | Bernard A. Hawkins (incumbent) | 2,445 | 49.41% |
| Total votes | | 4,948 | 100.00% |
| Republican gain from Democratic | | | |

=== District 54 ===
Primary Election Results
| Party | Candidate | Votes | % |
Democratic Party Primary Results
| Democratic | William W. O'Brien (incumbent) | 1,476 | 100.00% |
| Total votes | | 1,476 | 100.00% |

General Election Results
| Party | Candidate | Votes | % |
|---|---|---|---|
| Democratic | William W. O'Brien (incumbent) | 3,464 | 100.00% |
| Total votes | | 3,464 | 100.00% |
| Democratic hold | | | |

=== District 55 ===
Primary Election Results
| Party | Candidate | Votes | % |
Democratic Party Primary Results
| Democratic | Arthur J. Corvese (incumbent) | 1,711 | 68.85% |
| Democratic | Clara A. Hardy | 774 | 31.15% |
| Total votes | | 2,485 | 100.00% |

General Election Results
| Party | Candidate | Votes | % |
|---|---|---|---|
| Democratic | Arthur J. Corvese (incumbent) | 3,866 | 100.00% |
| Total votes | | 3,866 | 100.00% |
| Democratic hold | | | |

=== District 56 ===
Primary Election Results
| Party | Candidate | Votes | % |
Democratic Party Primary Results
| Democratic | Joshua J.D. Giraldo (incumbent) | 495 | 100.00% |
| Total votes | | 495 | 100.00% |

General Election Results
| Party | Candidate | Votes | % |
|---|---|---|---|
| Democratic | Joshua J.D. Giraldo (incumbent) | 934 | 100.00% |
| Total votes | | 934 | 100.00% |
| Democratic hold | | | |

=== District 57 ===
Primary Election Results
| Party | Candidate | Votes | % |
Democratic Party Primary Results
| Democratic | Brandon T. Voas | 675 | 51.29% |
| Democratic | James N. McLaughlin (incumbent) | 641 | 48.71% |
| Total votes | | 1,316 | 100.00% |
Republican Party Primary Results
| Republican | Dennis Huard | 158 | 100.00% |
| Total votes | | 158 | 100.00% |

General Election Results
| Party | Candidate | Votes | % |
|---|---|---|---|
| Democratic | Brandon T. Voas | 1,752 | 64.82% |
| Republican | Dennis Huard | 951 | 35.18% |
| Total votes | | 2,703 | 100.00% |
| Democratic hold | | | |

=== District 58 ===
Primary Election Results
| Party | Candidate | Votes | % |
Democratic Party Primary Results
| Democratic | Cherie L. Cruz | 368 | 33.15% |
| Democratic | Maribel Echeverry McLaughlin | 325 | 29.28% |
| Democratic | George P. Hovarth | 323 | 29.10% |
| Democratic | Matthew P. Carvalho | 94 | 8.47% |
| Total votes | | 1,110 | 100.00% |

General Election Results
| Party | Candidate | Votes | % |
|---|---|---|---|
| Democratic | Cherie L. Cruz | 1,647 | 100.00% |
| Total votes | | 1,647 | 100.00% |
| Democratic hold | | | |

=== District 59 ===
Primary Election Results
| Party | Candidate | Votes | % |
Democratic Party Primary Results
| Democratic | Jennifer A. Stewart | 718 | 52.52% |
| Democratic | Jean Philippe Barros (incumbent) | 649 | 47.48% |
| Total votes | | 1,367 | 100.00% |

General Election Results
| Party | Candidate | Votes | % |
|---|---|---|---|
| Democratic | Jennifer A. Stewart | 2,188 | 100.00% |
| Total votes | | 2,188 | 100.00% |
| Democratic hold | | | |

=== District 60 ===
Primary Election Results
| Party | Candidate | Votes | % |
Democratic Party Primary Results
| Democratic | Karen Alzate (incumbent) | 531 | 100.00% |
| Total votes | | 531 | 100.00% |

General Election Results
| Party | Candidate | Votes | % |
|---|---|---|---|
| Democratic | Karen Alzate (incumbent) | 1,392 | 100.00% |
| Total votes | | 1,392 | 100.00% |
| Democratic hold | | | |

=== District 61 ===
Primary Election Results
| Party | Candidate | Votes | % |
Democratic Party Primary Results
| Democratic | Leonela Felix (incumbent) | 1,049 | 100.00% |
| Total votes | | 1,049 | 100.00% |
Republican Party Primary Results
| Republican | Richard R. Karsulavitch | 155 | 100.00% |
| Total votes | | 155 | 100.00% |

General Election Results
| Party | Candidate | Votes | % |
|---|---|---|---|
| Democratic | Leonela Felix (incumbent) | 2,202 | 61.59% |
| Republican | Richard R. Karsulavitch | 1,373 | 38.41% |
| Total votes | | 3,575 | 100.00% |
| Democratic hold | | | |

=== District 62 ===
Primary Election Results
| Party | Candidate | Votes | % |
Democratic Party Primary Results
| Democratic | Mary Duffy Messier (incumbent) | 747 | 63.74% |
| Democratic | Kinverly P. Dicupe Paulino | 425 | 36.26% |
| Total votes | | 1,172 | 100.00% |
Republican Party Primary Results
| Republican | Wayne J. Charbonneau | 113 | 100.00% |
| Total votes | | 113 | 100.00% |

General Election Results
| Party | Candidate | Votes | % |
|---|---|---|---|
| Democratic | Mary Duffy Messier (incumbent) | 1,787 | 61.03% |
| Republican | Wayne J. Charbonneau | 892 | 30.46% |
| Independent | David A. Coughlin, Jr. | 249 | 8.50% |
| Total votes | | 2,928 | 100.00% |
| Democratic hold | | | |

=== District 63 ===
Primary Election Results
| Party | Candidate | Votes | % |
Democratic Party Primary Results
| Democratic | Katherine S. Kazarian (incumbent) | 1,955 | 100.00% |
| Total votes | | 1,955 | 100.00% |
Republican Party Primary Results
| Republican | Anthony Sionni | 241 | 100.00% |
| Total votes | | 241 | 100.00% |

General Election Results
| Party | Candidate | Votes | % |
|---|---|---|---|
| Democratic | Katherine S. Kazarian (incumbent) | 3,640 | 70.65% |
| Republican | Anthony Sionni | 1,512 | 29.35% |
| Total votes | | 5,152 | 100.00% |
| Democratic hold | | | |

=== District 64 ===
Primary Election Results
| Party | Candidate | Votes | % |
Democratic Party Primary Results
| Democratic | Brianna E. Henries (incumbent) | 695 | 55.25% |
| Democratic | Ashley Pereira | 563 | 44.75% |
| Total votes | | 1,258 | 100.00% |

General Election Results
| Party | Candidate | Votes | % |
|---|---|---|---|
| Democratic | Brianna E. Henries (incumbent) | 2,107 | 66.57% |
| Independent | Antonio U. de Simas | 1,058 | 33.43% |
| Total votes | | 3,165 | 100.00% |
| Democratic hold | | | |

=== District 65 ===
Primary Election Results
| Party | Candidate | Votes | % |
Democratic Party Primary Results
| Democratic | Matthew S. Dawson | 1,385 | 63.59% |
| Democratic | San Shoppell | 793 | 36.41% |
| Total votes | | 2,178 | 100.00% |
Republican Party Primary Results
| Republican | John R. Peters | 329 | 100.00% |
| Total votes | | 329 | 100.00% |

General Election Results
| Party | Candidate | Votes | % |
|---|---|---|---|
| Democratic | Matthew S. Dawson | 3,613 | 66.66% |
| Republican | John R. Peters | 1,807 | 33.34% |
| Total votes | | 5,420 | 100.00% |
| Democratic hold | | | |

=== District 66 ===
Primary Election Results
| Party | Candidate | Votes | % |
Democratic Party Primary Results
| Democratic | Jennifer Smith Boylan | 1,716 | 100.00% |
| Total votes | | 1,716 | 100.00% |

General Election Results
| Party | Candidate | Votes | % |
|---|---|---|---|
| Democratic | Jennifer Smith Boylan | 3,584 | 57.57% |
| Independent | Samuel R. Read | 2,641 | 42.43% |
| Total votes | | 6,225 | 100.00% |
| Democratic hold | | | |

=== District 67 ===
Primary Election Results
| Party | Candidate | Votes | % |
Democratic Party Primary Results
| Democratic | Jason P. Knight (incumbent) | 1,573 | 100.00% |
| Total votes | | 1,573 | 100.00% |
Republican Party Primary Results
| Republican | Scott W. Fuller | 304 | 100.00% |
| Total votes | | 304 | 100.00% |

General Election Results
| Party | Candidate | Votes | % |
|---|---|---|---|
| Democratic | Jason P. Knight (incumbent) | 3,603 | 60.56% |
| Republican | Scott W. Fuller | 2,346 | 39.44% |
| Total votes | | 5,949 | 100.00% |
| Democratic hold | | | |

=== District 68 ===
Primary Election Results
| Party | Candidate | Votes | % |
Democratic Party Primary Results
| Democratic | June S. Speakman (incumbent) | 1,357 | 100.00% |
| Total votes | | 1,357 | 100.00% |
Republican Party Primary Results
| Republican | Rae-Ann Lawrence | 285 | 100.00% |
| Total votes | | 285 | 100.00% |

General Election Results
| Party | Candidate | Votes | % |
|---|---|---|---|
| Democratic | June S. Speakman (incumbent) | 3,333 | 56.98% |
| Republican | Rae-Ann Lawrence | 2,516 | 43.02% |
| Total votes | | 5,849 | 100.00% |
| Democratic hold | | | |

=== District 69 ===
Primary Election Results
| Party | Candidate | Votes | % |
Democratic Party Primary Results
| Democratic | Susan Ann Donovan (incumbent) | 887 | 100.00% |
| Total votes | | 887 | 100.00% |
Republican Party Primary Results
| Republican | Robert Emmett O'Neill | 203 | 100.00% |
| Total votes | | 203 | 100.00% |

General Election Results
| Party | Candidate | Votes | % |
|---|---|---|---|
| Democratic | Susan Ann Donovan (incumbent) | 2,684 | 60.40% |
| Republican | Robert Emmett O'Neill | 1,760 | 39.60% |
| Total votes | | 4,444 | 100.00% |
| Democratic hold | | | |

=== District 70 ===
Primary Election Results
| Party | Candidate | Votes | % |
Democratic Party Primary Results
| Democratic | John G. Edwards, IV (incumbent) | 832 | 100.00% |
| Total votes | | 832 | 100.00% |
Republican Party Primary Results
| Republican | Christopher M. Borden | 388 | 100.00% |
| Total votes | | 388 | 100.00% |

General Election Results
| Party | Candidate | Votes | % |
|---|---|---|---|
| Democratic | John G. Edwards, IV (incumbent) | 2,901 | 54.72% |
| Republican | Christopher M. Borden | 2,401 | 45.28% |
| Total votes | | 5,302 | 100.00% |
| Democratic hold | | | |

=== District 71 ===
Primary Election Results
| Party | Candidate | Votes | % |
Democratic Party Primary Results
| Democratic | Michelle Elise McGaw (incumbent) | 1,453 | 100.00% |
| Total votes | | 1,453 | 100.00% |

General Election Results
| Party | Candidate | Votes | % |
|---|---|---|---|
| Democratic | Michelle Elise McGaw (incumbent) | 3,787 | 63.84% |
| Independent | Kobe J. Taylor | 2,145 | 36.16% |
| Total votes | | 5,932 | 100.00% |
| Democratic hold | | | |

=== District 72 ===
Primary Election Results
| Party | Candidate | Votes | % |
Democratic Party Primary Results
| Democratic | Terri-Denise Cortvriend (incumbent) | 1,396 | 100.00% |
| Total votes | | 1,396 | 100.00% |

General Election Results
| Party | Candidate | Votes | % |
|---|---|---|---|
| Democratic | Terri-Denise Cortvriend (incumbent) | 4,524 | 100.00% |
| Total votes | | 4,524 | 100.00% |
| Democratic hold | | | |

=== District 73 ===
Primary Election Results
| Party | Candidate | Votes | % |
Democratic Party Primary Results
| Democratic | Marvin L. Abney (incumbent) | 816 | 100.00% |
| Total votes | | 816 | 100.00% |

General Election Results
| Party | Candidate | Votes | % |
|---|---|---|---|
| Democratic | Marvin L. Abney (incumbent) | 2,983 | 100.00% |
| Total votes | | 2,983 | 100.00% |
| Democratic hold | | | |

=== District 74 ===
Primary Election Results
| Party | Candidate | Votes | % |
Democratic Party Primary Results
| Democratic | Alex S. Finkelman | 1,414 | 100.00% |
| Total votes | | 1,414 | 100.00% |

General Election Results
| Party | Candidate | Votes | % |
|---|---|---|---|
| Democratic | Alex S. Finkelman | 4,087 | 100.00% |
| Total votes | | 4,087 | 100.00% |
| Democratic hold | | | |

=== District 75 ===
Primary Election Results
| Party | Candidate | Votes | % |
Democratic Party Primary Results
| Democratic | Lauren H. Carson (incumbent) | 1,138 | 100.00% |
| Total votes | | 1,138 | 100.00% |

General Election Results
| Party | Candidate | Votes | % |
|---|---|---|---|
| Democratic | Lauren H. Carson (incumbent) | 3,485 | 100.00% |
| Total votes | | 3,485 | 100.00% |
| Democratic hold | | | |

== See also ==
- 2022 United States elections
- 2022 United States House of Representatives elections in Rhode Island
- 2022 Rhode Island elections
- 2022 Rhode Island gubernatorial election
- 2022 Rhode Island Senate election
- Rhode Island General Assembly
- Rhode Island House of Representatives
