= Sabina Matos =

American politician (born 1974)

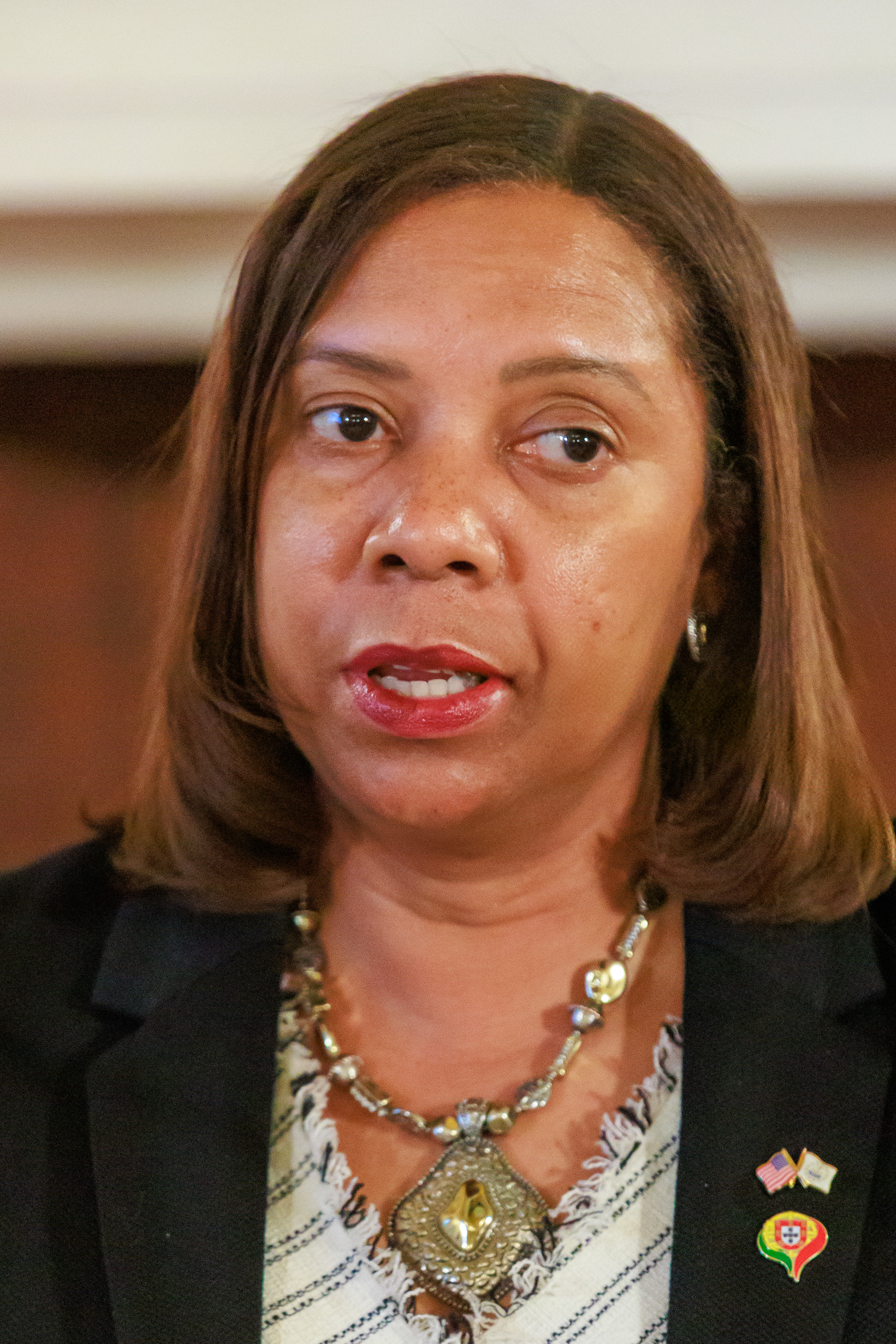
- Matos in 2025

70th Lieutenant Governor of Rhode Island
- Incumbent
- Assumed office April 14, 2021
- Governor: Dan McKee; Helena Foulkes (elect)
- Preceded by: Dan McKee

President of the Providence City Council
- In office January 7, 2019 – April 13, 2021
- Preceded by: David Salvatore
- Succeeded by: John Igliozzi
- Acting; May 19, 2017 – December 21, 2017
- Preceded by: Luis Aponte
- Succeeded by: David Salvatore

Member of the Providence City Council from Ward 15
- In office January 2011 – April 13, 2021
- Preceded by: Josephine DiRuzzo
- Succeeded by: Oscar Vargas

Personal details
- Born: February 13, 1974 (age 52) Paraíso, Dominican Republic
- Party: Democratic
- Spouse: Patrick Ward
- Children: 2
- Education: Rhode Island College (BA)

Sabina Matos (born February 13, 1974) is a Dominican American politician serving as the 70th lieutenant governor of Rhode Island. She is the first Dominican American elected to statewide office in the United States and the first Black statewide officeholder in Rhode Island.

A member of the Democratic Party, she previously represented Ward 15 in the Providence City Council and served as Council President. In 2023, she ran unsuccessfully in the special election for Rhode Island's 1st congressional district, being eliminated in the Democratic primary.

== Early life ==
Matos was born in Paraíso, Barahona, Dominican Republic in 1974. Her mother was a teacher and her father served as mayor of Paraíso. She immigrated to the United States in April 1994, at the age of 20, with her parents and sister. She spoke no English when she moved to the United States, and thought she would return to the Dominican Republic by the end of the year.

After briefly living in New York, Matos and her family settled with her uncle in the Olneyville neighborhood of Providence, Rhode Island. Matos graduated from Rhode Island College with a bachelor's degree in communications and public relations in 2001. She became a United States citizen in 2005.

== Providence City Council ==
Matos ran for the Ward 15 seat on the Providence City Council in the 2006 elections, losing the Democratic primary to long standing incumbent Josephine DiRuzzo. She challenged DiRuzzo again in 2010, and won. She was a 2014 Aspen Institute Rodel Fellow.

Matos became acting president of the council in May 2017 and served in the role until December 2017. She was elected president of the city council in January 2019. During the 2020 presidential election, she served as one of Rhode Island's four electors.

== Lieutenant Governor of Rhode Island (2021-present) ==
In 2021, after Gina Raimondo resigned as Governor of Rhode Island to become the United States Secretary of Commerce, and Lieutenant Governor Dan McKee succeeded her as Governor, Matos applied to become the next Lieutenant Governor of Rhode Island. On March 31, 2021, Governor McKee announced he would nominate Matos to be Lieutenant Governor. The confirmation process began in the Rhode Island Senate on April 8, and the judiciary committee approved her nomination unanimously, sending her nomination for confirmation by the full Senate.

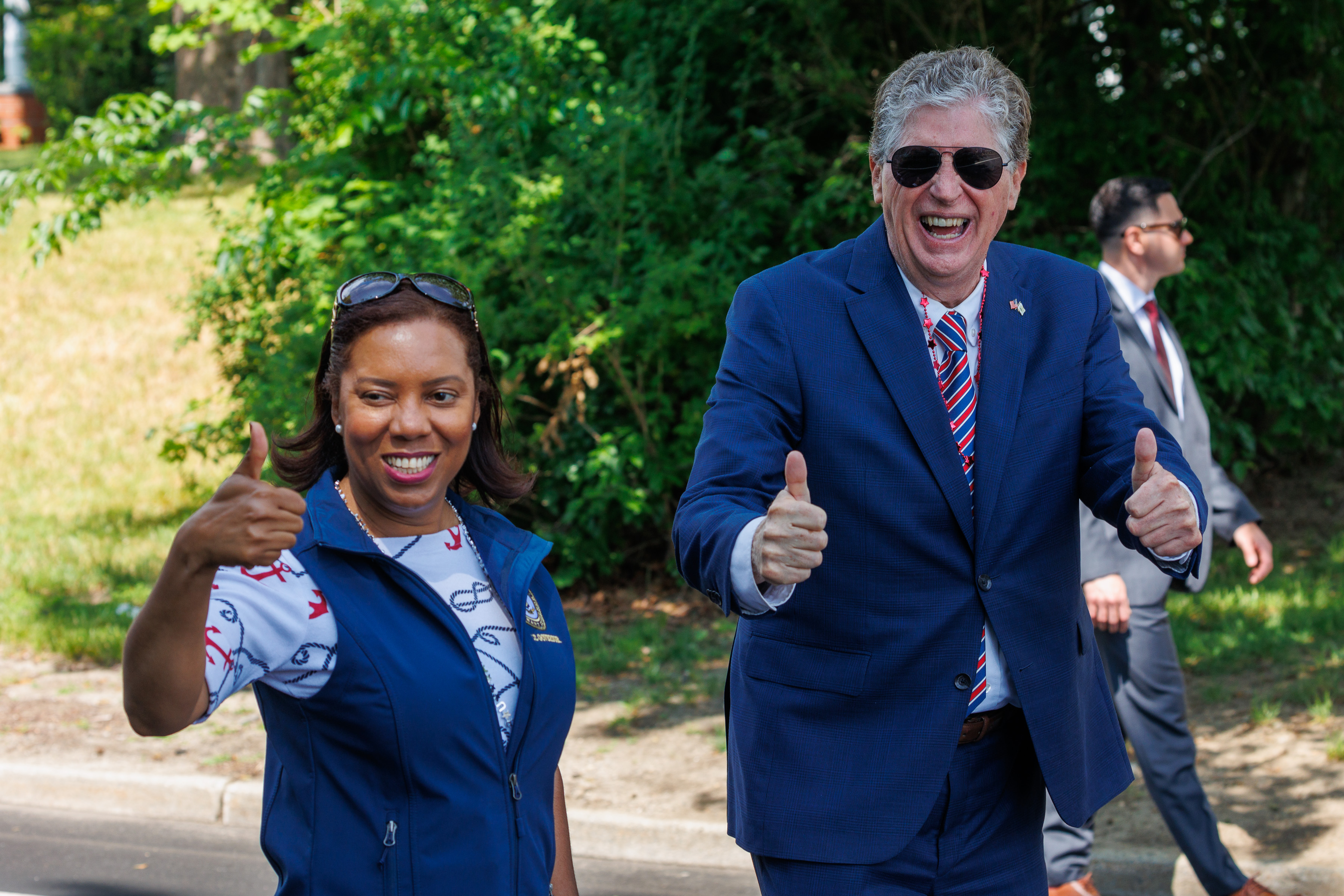
Matos with Dan McKee in 2023

On April 9, 2021, Matos submitted her resignation from the Providence City Council, effective April 13. Matos was confirmed as lieutenant governor by the State Senate on April 13 by a vote of 34–0 and was sworn into office on April 14. She is the first member of an ethnic minority and the second woman to hold the position.

In the 2022 Democratic primary, Sabina Matos defeated State Representative Deb Ruggiero and State Senator Cynthia Mendes winning with 47.1% of the vote. In the 2022 general election, Matos defeated Republican Aaron Guckian and Independent Ross McCurdy winning with 51.2% of the vote.

In 2022, Matos supported the Tidewater Landing Soccer Stadium deal. The deal was approved after Gov. Dan McKee cast the tie-breaking vote to approve $36 million in previously approved bond funding to pay for the stadium alone, instead of in partnership with adjacent housing and commercial development. The deal was criticized by State Senator Cynthia Mendes, as "a giveaway to 'luxury' housing developers, who then donate to the political campaigns of the people voting for the developments". Matos defended the deal saying it was "a proposal that brings sports back to Pawtucket, builds housing and protects taxpayers".

== 2023 congressional candidacy ==
On March 13, 2023, Matos announced her candidacy for the special election in Rhode Island's 1st congressional district. Polling released by Matos' campaign in June 2023 found that Matos led the Democratic primary field, where she faced eight opponents. Her candidacy was endorsed by Emily's List, Latino Victory, PODER PAC, Elect Black Women PAC, Elect Democratic Women PAC and Bold PAC, a political action committee associated with the Congressional Hispanic Caucus.

In April, Matos falsely claimed 31 endorsements from politicians across the state. The next day, the campaign admitted that despite its initial claims, six of its alleged endorsees did not actually endorse her.

Matos lost the primary, placing well behind the eventual winner Gabe Amo, receiving just 8% of the vote.

=== Investigations of campaign signatures ===
Matos qualified for the ballot, but her campaign was the subject of criminal investigations for submitting fraudulent signatures on campaign nomination papers. On July 17, 2023, Jamestown election officials discovered alleged fraudulent signatures on Matos' campaign nomination papers and referred them to the local police. The alleged fraud included names and signatures of five voters who had been dead for multiple years. In the following days, similar instances of fraudulent signatures were discovered on nomination papers at the Newport and East Providence Board of Elections and subsequently reported to local authorities. The paperwork referred to local police included signatures purportedly from individual residents who claim they never signed the nomination papers, and signatures from all five members of the East Providence City Council with incorrect addresses, including two at City Hall. On July 19, it was announced that Rhode Island Attorney General Peter Neronha was taking the lead in investigating Matos' campaign signatures across the state. The investigation is ongoing.

On August 8, 2023 the Rhode Island Board of Elections voted 5-to-2 to review all 1,526 signatures submitted on behalf of the Lieutenant Governor. In April 2024, the Rhode Island attorney General's office brought criminal charges against a company hired by Matos' campaign to collect signatures.

== Personal life ==
Matos resides in Providence with her husband, Patrick Ward, and their children. She is Catholic.

== Electoral history ==
2022 Rhode Island lieutenant gubernatorial election
Primary election
Party	Candidate	Votes	%	
Democratic	Sabina Matos (incumbent)	50,704	47.11%	
Democratic	Deb Ruggiero	35,620	33.10%	
Democratic	Cynthia Mendes	21,304	19.79%	
Total votes		107,628	100.0%	
General election
Democratic	Sabina Matos (incumbent)	180,909	51.18%	–10.69%
Republican	Aaron Guckian	152,458	43.13%	+14.04%
Independent	Ross McCurdy	19,507	5.52%	+2.95%
Write-in		608	0.17%	–0.52%
Total votes		353,482	100.0%	
Democratic hold				

Primary results by municipality: Amo: 20–30%; 30–40%; 40–50%; 50–60%; Regunberg: 20–30%; Cano: 30–40%; Casey: 30–40%

2023 Rhode Island's 1st congressional district primary results
Party	Candidate	Votes	%
Democratic	Gabe Amo	12,946	32.4
Democratic	Aaron Regunberg	9,960	24.9
Democratic	Sandra Cano	5,574	13.9
Democratic	Sabina Matos	3,210	8.0
Democratic	Stephen Casey	2,329	5.8
Democratic	Walter Berbrick	1,453	3.6
Democratic	Ana Quezada	1,415	3.5
Democratic	John Goncalves	1,118	2.8
Democratic	Donald Carlson (withdrawn)	690	1.7
Democratic	Allen Waters	503	1.3
Democratic	Stephanie Beauté	428	1.1
Democratic	Spencer Dickinson	354	0.9
Total votes		39,980	100.0

2026 Rhode Island lieutenant gubernatorial election
Primary election
Party	Candidate	Votes	%
Democratic	Sabina Matos (incumbent)	46,914	37.6
Democratic	Xay Khamsyvoravong	32,763	26.2
Democratic	Sue AnderBois	21,544	17.3
Democratic	Cynthia Armour Coyne	16,324	13.1
Democratic	Ross McCurdy	7,248	5.8
Total votes		124,793	100.0
General election
Democratic	Sabina Matos (incumbent)		
Republican	John J. Loughlin Jr.		
Write-in			
Total votes			100.0

== See also ==
- List of female lieutenant governors in the United States
- List of minority governors and lieutenant governors in the United States

Political offices
Preceded by Dan McKee	Lieutenant Governor of Rhode Island; 2021–present	Incumbent
Party political offices
Preceded by Dan McKee	Democratic nominee for Lieutenant Governor of Rhode Island; 2022, 2026	Most recent
