= 2022 Rhode Island lieutenant gubernatorial election =

- November 8, 2022
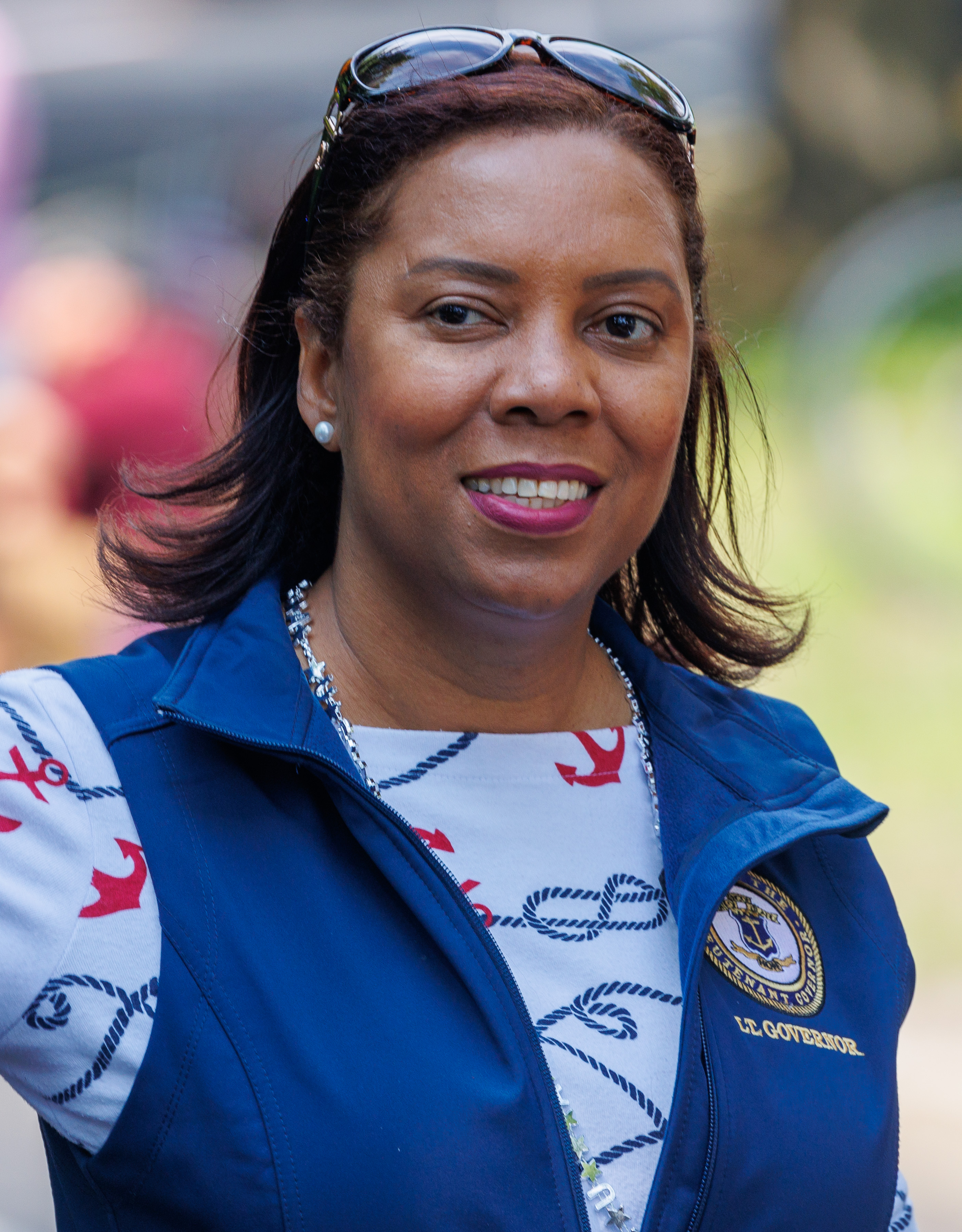

| Nominee | Sabina Matos | Aaron Guckian | Ross McCurdy |
| Party | Democratic | Republican | Independent |
| Popular vote | 180,909 | 152,458 | 19,507 |
| Percentage | 51.2% | 43.1% | 5.5% |
- Matos: 40–50% 50–60% 60–70% 70–80% Guckian: 40–50% 50–60% 60–70%
Lieutenant Governor before election
Sabina Matos
Democratic
Elected Lieutenant Governor
Sabina Matos
Democratic

The 2022 Rhode Island lieutenant gubernatorial election was held on November 8, 2022, to elect the lieutenant governor of the state of Rhode Island. The election coincided with various other federal and state elections, including for Governor of Rhode Island. Primary elections were held on September 13. Rhode Island is one of 21 states that elects its lieutenant governor separately from its governor.

Incumbent Democratic lieutenant governor Sabina Matos was appointed to the seat in 2021 after the previous incumbent, Dan McKee, ascended to the governorship. McKee was re-elected in 2018 with 61.9% of the vote.

Matos won election to a full term, defeating her Republican opponent Aaron Guckian in the closest race for this office since 1998. She became the first Dominican American to be elected to a lieutenant governor position in the United States.

== Democratic primary ==
=== Candidates ===
==== Nominee ====
- Sabina Matos, incumbent lieutenant governor and former President of the Providence City Council

==== Eliminated in primary ====
- Cynthia Mendes, state senator
- Deb Ruggiero, state representative

==== Disqualified ====
- Larry Valencia, former state representative

==== Declined ====
- Aaron Regunberg, former state representative and candidate for lieutenant governor in 2018

=== Endorsements ===
Sabina Matos

Statewide officials

- Grace Diaz, state representative from the 11th district (2005–present)
- Dan McKee, Governor of Rhode Island (2021–present) and former Lieutenant Governor of Rhode Island (2015–2021)

State legislators

- Maryellen Goodwin, state senator from the 1st district (2005–present)
- Meghan Kallman, state senator from the 15th district (2021–present)
- Ana Quezada, state senator from the 2nd district (2017–present)
- Marcia Ranglin-Vassell, state representative from the 5th district (2017–present)
- Leonidas Raptakis, state senator from the 33rd district (1997–2011, 2013–present)
- Carlos Tobon, state representative from the 58th district (2015–present)
- Anastasia Williams, state representative from the 9th district (1993–present)

Local officials

- Roberto DaSilva, Mayor of East Providence (2019–present)
- Don Grebien, Mayor of Pawtucket (2011–present)
- Charles Lombardi, Mayor of North Providence (2007–present)
- Jeanne Marie Napolitano, Mayor of Newport (2014–2018, 2020–present)
- Angel Taveras, former Mayor of Providence (2011–2015)

Organizations

- The Collective PAC
- Everytown for Gun Safety
- Rhode Island Democratic Party
- Rhode Island Latino PAC

Labor unions

- International Brotherhood of Teamsters Local 251
- National Education Association Rhode Island
- United Nurses and Allied Professionals
Cynthia Mendes

U.S. Senators

- Bernie Sanders, U.S. Senator from Vermont (2007–present) and candidate for president of the United States in 2016 and 2020 (Independent)

Organizations

- Sierra Club
Deb Ruggiero

State legislators

- Joe Shekarchi, Speaker of the Rhode Island House of Representatives (2021–present) from the 23rd district (2013–present)

=== Debate ===
2022 Rhode Island Lieutenant Governor Democratic primary debate
| No. | Date | Host | Moderator | Link | Democratic | Democratic | Democratic |
| Key: P Participant A Absent N Not invited I Invited W Withdrawn | | | | | | | |
| Key: P Participant A Absent N Not invited I Invited W Withdrawn | | | | | Cynthia Mendes | Sabina Matos | Deb Ruggiero |
|---|---|---|---|---|---|---|---|
| 1 | Jul. 29, 2022 | WPRI-TV | Ted Nesi; Tim White | | P | P | P |
| 2 | Sep. 7, 2022 | WJAR | Gene Valicenti | YouTube | P | A | P |

=== Polling ===
| Poll source | Date(s) administered | Sample size (Note: Key: A – all adults RV – registered voters LV – likely voters V – unclear) | Margin of error | Sabina Matos | Cynthia Mendes | Deb Ruggiero | Undecided |
|---|---|---|---|---|---|---|---|
| Change Research (D) (Note: Poll jointly sponsored by Democratic Promise Action Fund and Matt Brown and Mendes' campaign for Governor and Lieutenant Governor) | September 4–5, 2022 | 602 (LV) | ± 4.1% | 22% | 14% | 15% | 41% |
| Fleming & Associates | August 7–10, 2022 | 405 (LV) | ± 4.9% | 23% | 9% | 14% | 51% |
| Expedition Strategies (D) (Note: Poll sponsored by Matos's campaign) | July 19–24, 2022 | 402 (LV) | ± 4.9% | 30% | 10% | 16% | 44% |
| Fleming & Associates | May 9–12, 2022 | 400 (LV) | ± 4.9% | 21% | 12% | 13% | 53% |

=== Results ===
Democratic primary results
| Party | Candidate | Votes | % |
|---|---|---|---|
| Democratic | Sabina Matos (incumbent) | 50,704 | 47.11% |
| Democratic | Deb Ruggiero | 35,620 | 33.10% |
| Democratic | Cynthia Mendes | 21,304 | 19.79% |
| Total votes | | 107,628 | 100.0% |

== Republican primary ==
=== Candidates ===
==== Nominee ====
- Aaron Guckian, Chairman of the Warwick Sewer Authority and former aide to former Governor Donald Carcieri

==== Eliminated in primary ====
- Paul Pence, food safety coordinator and nominee for lieutenant governor in 2018

==== Withdrawn ====
- Jeann Lugo, police officer

=== Endorsements ===
Aaron Guckian

Organizations

- Rhode Island Republican Party

=== Results ===
Republican primary results
| Party | Candidate | Votes | % |
|---|---|---|---|
| Republican | Aaron Guckian | 13,427 | 67.73% |
| Republican | Paul Pence | 6,396 | 32.27% |
| Total votes | | 19,823 | 100.0% |

== Independents ==
=== Candidates ===
==== Declared ====
- Keith Harrison, veteran (did not appear on the ballot)
- Ross McCurdy, candidate in 2018

== General election ==
=== Forum ===
2022 Rhode Island Lieutenant Governor candidate forum
| No. | Date | Host | Moderator | Link | Democratic | Republican | Independent |
| Key: P Participant A Absent N Not invited I Invited W Withdrawn | | | | | | | |
| Key: P Participant A Absent N Not invited I Invited W Withdrawn | | | | | Sabina Matos | Aaron Guckian | Ross McCurdy |
|---|---|---|---|---|---|---|---|
| 1 | | North Kingstown; High School | | YouTube | P | P | P |

=== Results ===
2022 Rhode Island lieutenant gubernatorial election
| Party | Candidate | Votes | % | ±% |
|---|---|---|---|---|
| Democratic | Sabina Matos (incumbent) | 180,909 | 51.18% | –10.69% |
| Republican | Aaron Guckian | 152,458 | 43.13% | +14.04% |
| Independent | Ross McCurdy | 19,507 | 5.52% | +2.95% |
| Write-in | | 608 | 0.17% | –0.52% |
| Total votes | | 353,482 | 100.0% | |
| Democratic hold | | | | |

==== By county ====
| | Sabina Matos Democratic | | Aaron Guckian Republican | | Others | |
| County | Votes | % | Votes | % | Votes | % |
|---|---|---|---|---|---|---|
| Bristol | 11,182 | 55.13% | 7,861 | 38.75% | 1,241 | 6.12% |
| Kent | 30,202 | 44.5% | 34,041 | 50.16% | 3,620 | 5.33% |
| Newport | 17,621 | 55.28% | 12,369 | 38.81% | 1,866 | 5.91% |
| Providence | 93,119 | 53.09% | 72,411 | 41.28% | 9,875 | 5,63% |
| Washington | 28,785 | 49.58% | 25,776 | 44.4% | 3,495 | 6.01% |

Counties that flipped from Democratic to Republican

- Kent (largest city: Warwick)

==== By congressional district ====
Matos won both congressional districts.

| District | Matos | Guckian | Representative |
|---|---|---|---|
| 1st | 56% | 38% | David Cicilline |
| 2nd | 47.4% | 46.9% | James Langevin (117th Congress) |
| 2nd | 47.4% | 46.9% | Seth Magaziner (118th Congress) |

== See also ==
- 2022 Rhode Island elections

== Notes ==
Partisan clients
