= John Edwards (Rhode Island politician) =

American politician

Jay Edwards
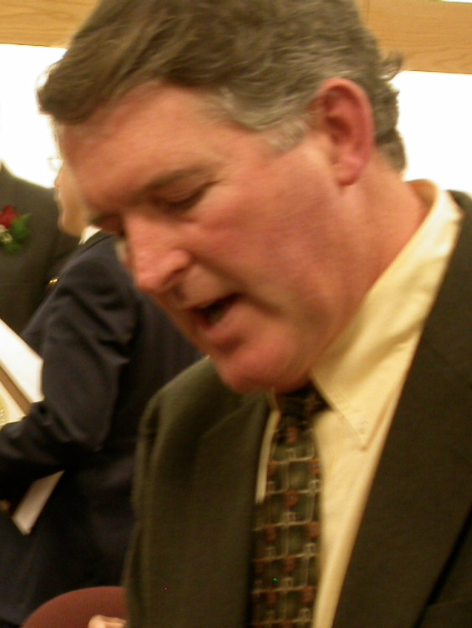

Member of the Rhode Island House of Representatives from the 70th district
- Incumbent
- Assumed office January 2009
- Preceded by: Joseph Amaral

Personal details
- Born: April 7, 1958 (age 68) Newport, Rhode Island, U.S.
- Party: Democratic
- Education: Northeastern University
- Profession: Construction Project Manager
- Website: elect-jay.com

John 'Jay' Gustav Edwards IV (born April 7, 1958 in Newport, Rhode Island) is an American politician and a Democratic member of the Rhode Island House of Representatives representing District 70 since January 2009. On March 25, 2014, Rep. Edwards was elected House Majority Whip by the House Democratic Caucus when Nicholas Mattiello became Speaker in 2014. Prior to that he had served as the Senior Deputy Majority Leader under Speaker Gordon Fox. In 2021, after Joe Shekarchi was elected speaker, Edwards was appointed Majority Floor Manager and replaced as Majority Whip by Katherine Kazarian. Edwards serves on the House Finance, House Oversight, House Municipal Government and House Labor Committees. In September 2014, Edwards became a CSG Henry Toll Fellow.

== Legislation ==
In the 2021 Legislative year, Rep. Edwards was able to have his legislation setting up a pilot program for safe injection sites enacted in RI, making Rhode Island the first state in the country to do so. Along with Senator Miller, Edwards was also able to decriminalize simple possession of buprenorphine making RI the 2nd state in the US to do so. In his freshman year, Rep Edwards was able to push through legislation that would increase the fines on industrial polluters from $1,000/day to $25,000/day in response to an environmental problem that occurred in the Bay Street area of his district in 2002. In 2012 Rhode Island became the 15th state to decriminalize possession of small amounts of marijuana under legislation championed by Rep Edwards. The major legislation that Edwards is responsible for is stopping the toll on the Sakonnet River Bridge that spans both towns represented by Edwards, Tiverton & Portsmouth. Included in the 2015 Rhode Island Budget, Edwards was able to have the toll removed, increased funding added to RIDOT and to have a statewide infrastructure program established outside of the state's budget. In 2022, Representative Edwards was the sole member of either the House or Senate and of either political party to vote against including Asian American history in the state's K-12 curriculum, a measure touted by Asian American advocates in the state to be a counter to anti-Asian American violence.

== Education ==
Edwards attended the Centre Scolaire St. Marc in Lyon, France during his junior year in high school and graduated from St. George's School in Middletown, Rhode Island in 1976. He earned his Bachelor degree in political science from Northeastern University.

== Elections ==
- 2012 Edwards was unopposed for the September 11, 2012 Democratic Primary, winning with 618 votes and won the November 6, 2012 General election with 4,267 votes (71.7%) against Independent candidate John Perkins.
- 2004 To challenge District 70 incumbent Republican Representative Joseph Amaral, Edwards ran in the September 14, 2004 Democratic Primary, but lost by 73 votes to K. Nicholas Tsiongas, who lost the November 2, 2004 General election to Representative Amaral.
- 2008 When Representative Amaral retired and left the seat open, Edwards was unopposed for both the September 9, 2008 Democratic Primary, winning with 279 votes and the November 4, 2008 General election, winning with 4,590 votes.
- 2010 Edwards was unopposed for the September 23, 2010 Democratic Primary, winning with 649 votes and won the November 2, 2010 General election with 2,760 votes (56.5%) against Republican nominee Nancy Driggs.
