= Jim Coughlan =

American politician

James Coughlan

Dutchess County Comptroller
- In office January 1, 2010 – January 1, 2018
- Preceded by: Diane Jablonski

Personal details
- Born: Jim Coughlan; September 19, 1967 (age 59) Dighton, Massachusetts, U.S.
- Party: Republican
- Spouse: Sharon Dixon Coughlan
- Education: Providence College
- Website: Government website Personal website

James Coughlan (born September 19, 1967) is a Republican politician and the former comptroller of Dutchess County, New York. After defeating incumbent Diane Jablonski, Coughlan took office on January 1, 2010, as the chief accounting and auditing officer of Dutchess County. He has described himself as "very conservative," and sent a controversial tweet in 2014 that was accused of being racist.

== Early life and career ==
Coughlan was born and raised in town of North Dighton, Massachusetts. After graduating from Providence College, Coughlan worked in the private sector for 15 years managing projects and keeping track of budget concerns. He is a graduate of Roger Williams University Law School and member of the Massachusetts and New York State bar associations.

== Political career ==
In November 2009, Coughlan defeated Democratic incumbent Comptroller Diane Jablonski, 26,233 to 25,616. As the county's chief financial officer and Chairman of the Audit Committee, he is responsible for managing the $425 Million annual budget for the county.

Coughlan conducted 50 investigations in his first term, examining the finances of county departments and other entities receiving county funding. During his first term, Coughlan advocated for reforms to New York State fiscal policies and expressed opposition for the MTA payroll tax and unfunded mandates.

In May 2013, Coughlan announced he would seek a second term as Dutchess County Comptroller. He ran unopposed in the general election on November 5, 2013, easily winning re-election with 33,410 total votes. On December 12, 2013, Coughlan announced his candidacy for New York state's 41st Senate District. He dropped out of the race in May, 2014.

In 2017, Coughlan was defeated for reelection by Democratic nominee Robin Lois, who took office in January 2018.
