= Kenneth Mendonca =

American politician

Member of the Rhode Island House of Representatives from District 72
- In office 2016–2018
- Succeeded by: Terri Denise Cortvriend

Personal details
- Party: Republican Party (United States)

Kenneth Mendonca is an American politician. He is a former State Representative in the Rhode Island House of Representatives.

== Elections ==
In 2015, Mendonca ran for Rhode Island State Senate District 11. He lost the primary to John Pagliarini, coming in second. In 2016, Mendonca ran for the State House. He won the Republican primary, then won the general election over (D) Linda Dill Finn. In 2018, he lost his bid for reelection to Terri Denise Cortvriend. In 2019, he dropped out of the race for state chair of the GOP.
