= Liana Cassar =

American politician

Member of the Rhode Island House of Representatives from the 66th district
- In office January 1, 2019 – January 3, 2023
- Preceded by: Joy Hearn
- Succeeded by: Jennifer Boylan

Personal details
- Born: Connecticut, US
- Party: Democrat
- Spouse: Larson Gunness
- Children: 2
- Education: BA, communications and Spanish, University of Connecticut; MPH, Boston University; MBA, Simmons University
- Website: electliana.org

Liana M. Cassar is an American politician who was a Democratic member of the Rhode Island House of Representatives, representing District 66 from 2019 to 2023.

== Early life and education ==
Cassar was born and raised in Connecticut, and graduated from John Jay High School in Katonah, New York. Following this, she graduated with a Bachelor of Arts degree from the University of Connecticut and served as a Community Development Worker in the Peace Corps in Costa Rica from 1992 to 1995. She also completed her MPH at Boston University and MBA from Simmons College.

== Career ==
Cassar has worked in various health care and public health sectors in Rhode Island and Massachusetts. She has served as co-chair of the Barrington Democratic Town Committee and as an Advisory Board Member for the Center for Health and Justice Transformation. Earlier, she was a strategy and Operations Consultant to Big Brothers Big Sisters of Rhode Island and served as a strategic business consultant for AthenaHealth. From 2006 until 2008, Cassar served as the Chief Operating Officer for Planned Parenthood of Rhode Island.

In January 2018, Cassar announced her bid to replace Joy Hearn as a member of the Rhode Island House of Representatives representing District 66. She defeated John Chung in the primary and Republican Rhonda Holmes in November's general election to win her first election. Prior to the COVID-19 pandemic in North America, Cassar announced legislation to lift the ban on abortion coverage for state employee health plans and ensure that abortion care is covered by Medicaid. Following this, she was appointed to the Health, Education and Welfare Committee while continuing to work with the House Committee on Small Business. In October, Cassar announced her bid for Rhode Island House Speaker against Nicholas Mattiello. She eventually dropped her bid in December after the majority of the House voted for Joe Shekarchi.
