= Alex Finkelman =

American politician (born 1986)

Member of the Rhode Island House of Representatives from the 74th district
- Incumbent
- Assumed office January 3, 2023
- Preceded by: Deborah Ruggiero

Personal details
- Born: February 13, 1986 (age 40) Rhode Island, U.S.
- Party: Democratic
- Children: 2
- Education: University of Hartford

Alex Finkelman (born February 13, 1986) is an American insurance executive and politician. A Democrat, Finkelman has represented the towns of Jamestown and Middletown in the Rhode Island House of Representatives since 2023.

== Early life and education ==
Finkelman was born in 1986 and was raised in Rhode Island. His mother's family has been involved in the Rhode Island jewelry business for over 75 years and his father's has been in the insurance business for many years as well.

Finkelman attended the Providence Country Day School in East Providence. He went on to graduate from the University of Hartford with a dual major in insurance and finance.

== Business career ==
After graduating from the University of Hartford, Finkelman began working in the insurance business at The Egis Group.

In 2020, Finkelman was named President of The Egis Group, a Warwick based insurance firm. Finkelman is a self-described small business owner, and has used that term throughout his career in both the private and public sectors.

== Political career ==
Finkelman had been somewhat active in local politics before being elected to the state house, previously serving on the Jamestown zoning board.

=== Rhode Island State House ===
Following his election to the state house, Finkelman was named to serve as a member of the House Corporations Committee and as a member of the House Small Business Committee.

Finkelman has notably been the prime sponsor of a piece of legislation which provided tax relief for Jamestown firefighters and another one to make the month of April 2023 the Month of the Military Child in the state. Three other bills sponsored by Finkelman are yet to be passed.

==== Elections ====
Finkelman has been elected to the Rhode Island State House once.

==== 2022 ====
In 2022, incumbent state representative Deb Ruggiero announced her campaign for the 2022 Rhode Island lieutenant gubernatorial election. Finkelman was the first Democrat to announce his candidacy to succeed Ruggiero. He was uncontested in both the primary and general election.

== Personal life ==
Finkelman lives in Jamestown with his wife and two kids. He is Jewish.
