= Azzinaro =

Azzinaro is a surname. Notable people with the surname include:

- Jerry Azzinaro (born 1958), American football coach
- Samuel Azzinaro (born 1943), American politician
