= Donna M. Walsh =

American politician (born 1943)

Member of the Rhode Island House of Representatives from the 36th district
- In office January 2007 – January 2015
- Preceded by: Matthew J. McHugh
- Succeeded by: Blake Filippi

Member of the Rhode Island Senate from the 25th district
- In office January 1997 – January 2003
- Preceded by: W. Michael Sullivan
- Succeeded by: district realigned in 2003

Personal details
- Born: January 28, 1943 (age 83)
- Party: Democratic
- Spouse(s): Henry Walsh, Jr.
- Children: Henry Walsh, III.
- Education: University of Rhode Island, BA 1971, MA 1976
- Profession: Retired educator

Donna M. Walsh (born 1943) is an American politician who was a Democratic member of the Rhode Island House of Representatives, representing the 36th District from 2007 to 2015. She served on the House Committee on Corporations, and the House Committee on Environment and Natural Resources.
