= Terri-Denise Cortvriend =

American politician (born 1962)

Terri Cortvriend

Member of the Rhode Island House of Representatives from the 72nd district
- Incumbent
- Assumed office January 1, 2019
- Preceded by: Kenneth Mendonca

Member of the Portsmouth School Committee
- In office 2012–2018
- In office 2004–2008

Personal details
- Born: January 15, 1962 (age 64) Miami, Florida, U.S.
- Party: Democratic
- Spouse: Charles
- Children: 1
- Education: Miami-Dade Community College

Terri-Denise Cortvriend (born January 15, 1962) is an American politician, businesswoman, pilot, and yacht captain. She is a Democratic member of the Rhode Island House of Representatives, and before that served as a member of the Portsmouth School Committee.

== Education & career ==
For High School she attended North Miami Senior High School. Cortvriend attended Miami-Dade Community College. She is an owner of a marine plumbing firm she founded in 1989. Before 1989, she worked as a yacht captain. Cortvriend holds a private pilot's license and a USCG Captain's license. She was a member of the Portsmouth School Committee for a total of nine years first from 2004 to 2008 and later from 2012 to 2018. Four of those years she served as the chairperson of the school committee. She has served on numerous boards and committees in the area including, the Newport Chamber of Commerce, the Portsmouth Water and Fire District Advisory Board, the Portsmouth Economic Development Committee, and the Portsmouth Charter Review Committee.

== Rhode Island House of Representatives ==
Cortvriend was first elected to the House for the 72nd district in 2018, defeating Republican incumbent Kenneth J. Mendonca. District 72 is made up of parts of Portsmouth, Rhode Island and Middletown, Rhode Island on Aquidneck Island in Newport County.

=== Elections ===
==== 2018 ====
Cortvriend announced that she was running after learning that Linda Finn, the Democratic representative who had previously been defeated by Mendoca, said she was not running. She ran as a small business owner who opposed Mendoca's bill that would allow businesses to pay workers under the age of 20 less than minimum wage. She also campaigned in favor of environmental protections. Cortvriend ran unopposed in the democratic primary and then later defeated Mendonca in the general election 54.6% to 45.3%.

==== 2020 ====
Cortvriend announced that she was running for reelection. She campaigned on sponsoring the Nathan Bruno and Jason Flatt Act, bringing climate literacy to K-12 schools, and helping constituents during the COVID-19 pandemic. Republican Kenneth Mendoca also announced that he was running for his old seat. The Providence Journal said this race was one of the Republican Party's best chances to pick up seats in the General Assembly and watchdog group RI Rank listed it as one of the most competitive assembly races in the state. Cortvriend won the primary contest against Christopher T. Semonelli with 80.7% of the vote and ended up defeating Mendoca again in the general election 57.5% to 42.3%.

=== Tenure ===
In 2020 RI Rank named Cortvriend the number one ranked representative in the House. RI Rank's system took into account the RI ACLU's civil rights voting record metrics, the Environmental Council of RI's environmental voting record metrics, RI Common Cause's opening government voting record metrics, as well as their own accountability metrics which measures things such as social media outreach and number of town hall meetings.

==== House reform ====
Cortvriend was one of a number of women members of the House who abstained in protest in the vote of Nicholas Mattiello for Speaker of the House. She is a member of the reform caucus which is a group of members who seek the rules of the House to be more transparent, open, and more democratic.

==== Environment and climate ====
Cortvriend was one of the founders of the Aquidneck Island Climate Caucus, a group of legislators and their constituents who want to give voice to the importance of mitigating and adapting to the changing climate. The caucus will be used as a vehicle for legislators to engage with their communities about environmental bills and issues coming before them.

==== Americans with Disabilities ====
Cortvriend was the lead sponsor in the House Preservation Of Families With Disabled Parent Act which was signed into law by Governor Dan McKee. The law makes it so that a parent's disability cannot be the sole basis to deny or restrict their rights in regards a child's welfare, foster care, family law, guardianship or adoption.

==== Public health ====
Cortvriend sponsored the Nathan Bruno and Jason Flatt Act, which would require two hours of suicide prevention training for all licensed educators in the state. The act is partial named for Nathan Bruno, a student at Portsmouth High School who committed suicide. Classmates and the family of Bruno have worked with Cortvriend to pass the act.

=== Committee assignments ===
- House Small Business Committee (2nd Vice Chair)
- House Environment and Natural Resources Committee
- House Oversight Committee

=== Caucus memberships ===
- Aquidneck Island Climate Caucus
- Reform Caucus

== Electoral history ==
=== 2018 ===
2018 Rhode Island's 72nd House of Representatives district Democratic primary
Party	Candidate	Votes	%
Democratic	Terri-Denise Cortvriend	1,285	100
Total votes		1,285	100

2018 Rhode Island's 72nd House of Representatives district election
Party	Candidate	Votes	%
Democratic	Terri-Denise Cortvriend	3,462	54.6
Republican	Kenneth J. Mendonca (Incumbent)	2,877	45.3
Write-In	Others	7	0.1
Total votes		3,646	100

=== 2020 ===
2020 Rhode Island's 72nd House of Representatives district Democratic primary
Party	Candidate	Votes	%
Democratic	Terri-Denise Cortvriend (Incumbent)	1,195	80.7
Democratic	Christopher T. Semonelli	286	19.3
Total votes		1,481	100

2020 Rhode Island's 72nd House of Representatives district election
Party	Candidate	Votes	%
Democratic	Terri-Denise Cortvriend (Incumbent)	4,781	57.5
Republican	Kenneth J. Mendonca	3,518	42.3
Write-In	Others	9	0.1
Total votes		8,308	100

=== 2022 ===
2022 Rhode Island's 72nd House of Representatives district Democratic primary
Party	Candidate	Votes	%
Democratic	Terri-Denise Cortvriend (Incumbent)	1,396	100
Total votes		1,396	100

2022 Rhode Island's 72nd House of Representatives district election
Party	Candidate	Votes	%
Democratic	Terri-Denise Cortvriend (Incumbent)	4,524	95.9
Write-In	Others	195	4.1
Total votes		4,719	100
