= Joy Hearn =

American politician

Member of the Rhode Island House of Representatives from the 66th district
- In office January 2009 – January 2019
- Preceded by: Susan Story
- Succeeded by: Liana Cassar

Personal details
- Born: February 17, 1958 (age 68)
- Party: Democratic
- Education: State University of New York at Geneseo

Joy Hearn (born February 17, 1958) is an American politician and a Democratic member of the Rhode Island House of Representatives representing District 66 since January 2009.

== Education ==
Hearn earned her BA degree from State University of New York at Geneseo.

== Elections ==
- 2012 Hearn was unopposed for the September 11, 2012 Democratic Primary, winning with 856 votes and was unopposed for the November 6, 2012 General election, winning with 4,155 votes (55.5%) against Republican nominee Manfred Diel and Independent candidate Eugene Saveory.
- 2008 When District 66 Republican Representative Susan Story retired and left the seat open, Hearn was unopposed for the September 9, 2008 Democratic Primary, winning with 271 votes and won the November 4, 2008 General election with 4,160 votes (55.1%) against Republican nominee Margaret Kane.
- 2010 Hearn and returning 2010 Republican opponent Margaret Kane were both unopposed for their September 23, 2010 primaries, setting up a rematch; Hearn won the three-way November 2, 2010 General election with 2,974 votes (47.3%) against Kane and Independent candidate Joel Hellmann, who had run for the District 88 seat in 1998.
