= Julie Casimiro =

American politician

Member of the Rhode Island House of Representatives from the 31st district
- In office January 3, 2017 – August 31, 2026
- Preceded by: Doreen Costa
- Succeeded by: Vacant

Personal details
- Party: Democratic
- Spouse: Richard Casimiro
- Education: Providence College

Julie A. Casimiro (born June 21, 1962) is an American politician who served as a member of the Rhode Island House of Representatives from 2017 to 2026. Casimiro, a member of the Democratic Party, represented District 31, which includes portions of North Kingstown and Exeter. Casimiro was first elected to the chamber on November 8, 2016, and assumed office on January 3, 2017.

Representative Casimiro is the operations director for the Kent County YMCA. She is also the 2nd Vice Chair of the North Kingstown Democratic Town Committee and is a mentor for the Year Up Providence Program.

She has lived in North Kingstown since 1997, and is married to Richard Casimiro.

== Early life and education ==
After graduating from Cranston High School West in 1980, she earned her bachelor's degree in marketing from Providence College in 1984.

== Political career ==
Casimiro first ran for elective office in 2014, when she challenged incumbent Republican State Representative Doreen Costa for the District 31 seat in the Rhode Island House of Representatives. She ran unopposed in the Democratic Party primary election, but lost the general election on November 4, 2014 to Costa by 357 votes. Casimiro earned 46.7 percent of the total votes cast, while Costa earned 53.2 percent.

In 2016, Casimiro ran again for the District 31 seat in the Rhode Island House of Representatives. Costa, the Republican incumbent, did not seek reelection to the RI House, and instead ran successfully for the North Kingstown Town Council. Casimiro won the Democratic primary unopposed, and faced Republican Michael Marfeo in the general election on November 8, 2016. She won the general election with 57.5 percent of the vote. On November 6, 2018, Casimiro won a second term unopposed in the Rhode Island House of Representatives, receiving 90.7 percent of the vote.

In the Rhode Island House, she serves on the House Committee on Health, Education and Welfare and the House Committee on Veterans' Affairs.

In August 2026, Rhode Island House Speaker Christopher Blazejewski and Attorney General Peter Neronha called on Casimiro to resign after it was revealed that she had moved to South Carolina and no longer resided in the state of Rhode Island. She resigned from the chamber on August 31, 2026.
