= Bernard Hawkins =

American politician

Member of the Rhode Island House of Representatives from the 53rd district
- In office January 1, 2019 – January 3, 2023
- Preceded by: Thomas Winfield
- Succeeded by: Brian Rea

Personal details
- Born: May 18, 1963 (age 63) Greenville, Rhode Island, U.S.
- Party: Democratic
- Spouse: Kerrilyn McGurn Hawkins m:2023
- Children: 1; William Hawkins
- Education: Southern Connecticut State University

Bernard Hawkins (born May 18, 1963) is an American politician. He served as a Democratic member for the 53rd district of the Rhode Island House of Representatives.

Born in Greenville, Rhode Island, Hawkins attended Southern Connecticut State University. In 2019, he won the election for the 53rd district of the Rhode Island House of Representatives. Hawkins succeeded Thomas Winfield. He assumed his office on January 1, 2019. Hawkins decided to run for re-election in the 53rd district in 2022.
