= Tina Spears =

Member of the Rhode Island House of Representatives

Member of the Rhode Island House of Representatives from the 36th district
- Incumbent
- Assumed office January 3, 2023
- Preceded by: Blake Filippi

Personal details
- Born: 1976 (age 49–50)
- Party: Democratic
- Education: University of Rhode Island (BA)
- Website: www.tinaspearsri.com

Tina L. Spears (born 1976) is an American politician and a Democratic member of the Rhode Island House of Representatives representing District 36 since January 2023.

== Political career ==
Spears was first elected to the Rhode Island House of Representatives in 2023, following the retirement of former House Minority Leader Blake Filippi. Spears defeated John Pacheco III by a margin of over 20% in the general election.

Spears serves on the House Environment and Natural Resources Committee and the House Municipal Government and Housing Committee.

== Personal life ==
Spears is named after Tina Louise who played Ginger Grant on the television show Gilligan's Island.

== Elections ==
- 2022 Spears was unopposed in the September 13, 2022 Democratic Primary, winning with 1,751 votes and won the November 8, 2022 General Election with 4,730 votes (61.5%) against Republican nominee John Pacheco III.
