= Brian Rea =

American politician

Member of the Rhode Island House of Representatives from the 53rd district
- In office January 3, 2023 – January 7, 2025
- Preceded by: Bernard Hawkins
- Succeeded by: Paul Santucci

Personal details
- Party: Republican

Brian Rea is an American politician who represented the 53rd district in the Rhode Island House of Representatives.

== Career ==
A Republican, he was elected in November 2022. Rea also owns a convenience store and restaurant in Glocester.

Rea attended Johnston High School and the Community College of Rhode Island. He lives in Smithfield with his wife Michelle.
