= Blake Filippi =

American politician from Rhode Island

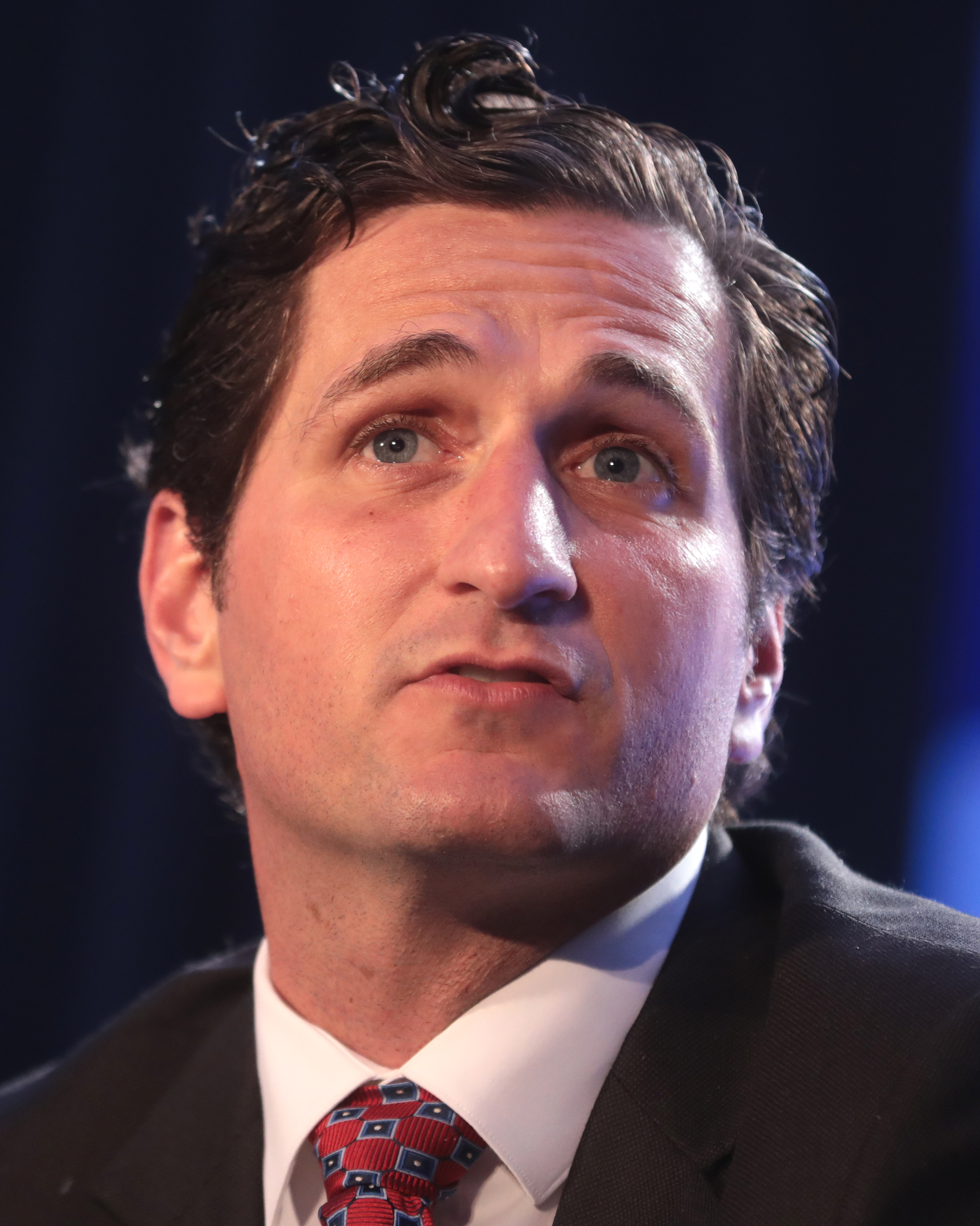
- Filippi in 2019

Minority Leader of the Rhode Island House of Representatives
- In office November 7, 2018 – June 23, 2022
- Preceded by: Patricia Morgan
- Succeeded by: Michael Chippendale

Minority Whip of the Rhode Island House of Representatives
- In office 2016 – November 7, 2018
- Succeeded by: Michael Chippendale

Member of the Rhode Island House of Representatives from the 36th district
- In office January 3, 2015 – January 3, 2023
- Preceded by: Donna M. Walsh
- Succeeded by: Tina Spears

Personal details
- Born: Blake Anthony Filippi; September 10, 1980 (age 45) Lincoln, Rhode Island, U.S.
- Party: Republican (Before 2012, 2016–present); Independent (2012–2016)
- Education: University of Arizona (BA); Rutgers University, Camden (JD)
- Website: Official website

Blake Anthony Filippi (born September 10, 1980) is an American politician who served as a member of the Rhode Island House of Representatives and as the House Minority Leader. Filippi represented the 36th district, which included all of Block Island and Charlestown and portions of Westerly and South Kingstown. Blake Filippi received his J.D. from Rutgers University School of Law, and is currently a member of the Republican Party. He has served since he was first elected in 2014, defeating incumbent Democratic Representative Donna M. Walsh. He was unanimously elected as Minority Leader of Rhode Island House of Representatives by the Republican Caucus in 2018, and previously, as Whip in 2016.

In February 2020, he spoke in favor of the presidential campaign of Tulsi Gabbard.

In January 2021, when questioned about fellow Rhode Island Representative Justin Price attending the pro-Trump Capital Riots in Washington DC, Filippi was quoted as saying “House members are expelled for bad acts, not bad thoughts. There are no allegations that Rep. Price did anything other than attend what he believed to be a lawful protest, and to express his opinion about what happened that sad day — and this is where a House inquiry ends."

On June 23, 2022, Filippi announced he would not seek reelection for House Minority Leader in 2023 and stepped down, being replaced with Minority Whip Michael Chippendale. Filippi stated that he would not seek reelection due to wanting to focus on an ongoing lawsuit against member of the state's Democratic Party leadership.

Rhode Island House of Representatives
Preceded by Patricia Morgan	Minority Leader of the Rhode Island House of Representatives; 2018–2022	Succeeded by Michael Chippendale
