= Jon D. Brien =

American politician from Rhode Island (born 1970)

Jon Brien

Member of the Rhode Island House of Representatives from the 49th district
- Incumbent
- Assumed office January 3, 2023
- Preceded by: Steven Lima

Member of the Woonsocket City Council
- In office December 6, 2016 – December 1, 2020

Member of the Rhode Island House of Representatives from the 50th district
- In office January 2, 2007 – January 1, 2013
- Preceded by: Todd Brien
- Succeeded by: Stephen Casey

Personal details
- Born: November 21, 1970 (age 56)
- Party: Independent
- Other political affiliations: Democratic (formerly)
- Spouse: Nicole Bourget Brien
- Children: 4
- Education: University of Rhode Island; New York Law School (JD); Suffolk University (MBA)

Jon D. Brien (born November 21, 1970) is an American politician who represents District 49 in the Rhode Island House of Representatives. Now an independent, he previously represented District 50 from 2007 to 2012 as a Democrat. He is married and has four children.

== Career ==
=== Political ===
Brien was Chair of the Rhode Island House Municipal Government Committee, Member of the Rhode Island House Judiciary Committee, and Chair of the Rhode Island House Commission to Study Municipal Financial Integrity. Brien ran to replace Patrick J. Kennedy in the U.S. House of Representatives for Rhode Island's 1st congressional district after he vacated his seat. Brien was also a legislative member of the American Legislative Exchange Council (ALEC).

=== Law ===
Brien is an attorney in private practice and is a partner in Brien & Brien, LLP. He is a member of the Rhode Island Bar Association, the New York Bar Association, and a former chairman of Woonsocket Planning Board.
