= Jennifer Boylan (politician) =

American politician

Member of the Rhode Island House of Representatives from the 66th district
- Incumbent
- Assumed office January 3, 2023
- Preceded by: Liana Cassar

Personal details
- Party: Democratic
- Children: 2
- Education: Franklin & Marshall College (BA); Washington University in St. Louis (MA)

Jennifer Smith Boylan is an American politician who has served as a Democratic member of the Rhode Island House of Representatives from the 66th district since 2023. She is Jewish.
