= Roger Williams University School of Law =

Private law school in Bristol, Rhode Island

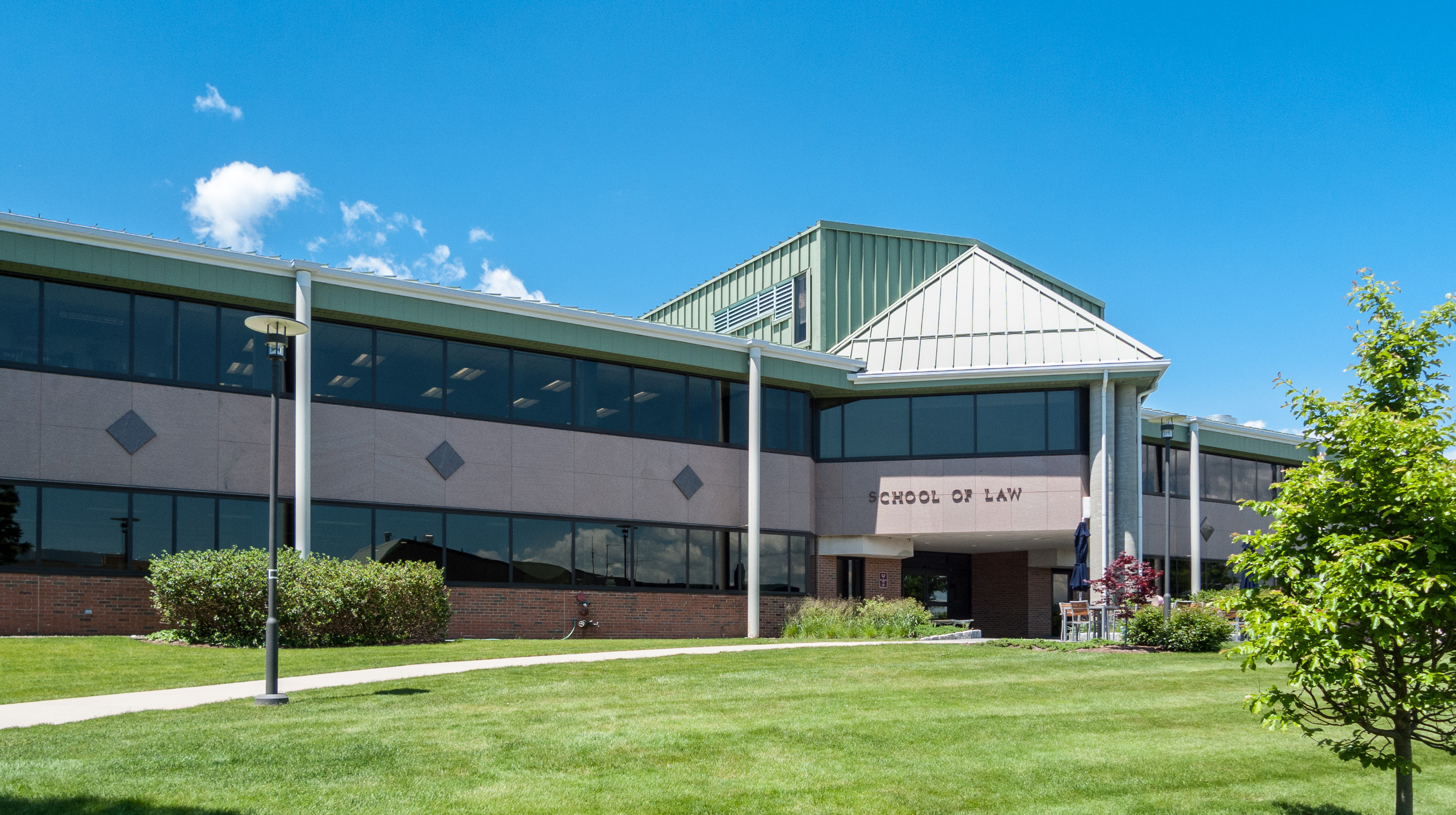
- Motto: Magna est veritas
- Established: 1993
- School type: Private law school
- Endowment: US$114.6 million (2008)
- Dean: Gregory Bowman
- Location: Bristol, Rhode Island, United States; 41.650957°N 71.261834°W
- Enrollment: 481
- Faculty: 100
- USNWR ranking: 169th (tie) (2025)
- Bar pass rate: 57.89% (2023; first-time takers)
- Website: law.rwu.edu
- ABA profile: Roger Williams Profile

Roger Williams University School of Law is the law school of Roger Williams University, a private university in Bristol, Rhode Island. It is the only law school in Rhode Island. It was established in 1993 as the first graduate degree program of Roger Williams College. The School of Law has been accredited by the American Bar Association since 1997 and has been a member of the Association of American Law Schools since 2006.

According to Roger Williams's official 2017 ABA-required disclosures, 76.67% of the class of 2017 obtained full-time, long-term, JD-required employment nine months after graduation. The bar passage rate for first-time takers in 2023 was 57.89%.

== History ==
In July 2007 the school made national headlines in the wake of a racist statement made by university trustee Ralph Papitto, for whom the law school was then named, at a Roger Williams board meeting. After students protested and submitted a petition to the administration, on July 18, 2007, Papitto requested that his name be removed from the school. Papitto resigned as chairman from the board and was granted the title "Chairman Emeritus". He was succeeded as chairman by Richard Bready, the CEO of Nortek Inc., the company Papitto founded.

== Academics ==
The school enrolls approximately 514 students and has a student-to-faculty ratio of around 8.6:1. The law library contains approximately 280,000 volumes.

Roger Williams University School of Law offers the Juris Doctor (JD) and Master of Studies in Law (MSL) degrees. The law school additionally offers joint degree programs, including master's programs in business administration, criminal justice, cybersecurity and preservation; the law school offers joint degrees in marine affairs and labor relations/human resources in conjunction with the University of Rhode Island.

RWU Law is nationally recognized as a leader in formulating law curriculum that focuses on "a historical overview and a current assessment of how race has played a role in American law" and which provides "critical analytic tools students can bring to all aspects of their legal education and future practice."

== Employment ==
According to Roger Williams's official 2017 ABA-required disclosures, 76.67% of the Class of 2017 obtained full-time, long-term, JD-required employment nine months after graduation. Roger Williams University School of Law ranks No. 11 nationally for the percentage of graduates entering public interest law careers, according to U.S. News & World Report’s Best Graduate Schools 2025 rankings.

== Costs ==
The total cost of attendance (indicating the cost of tuition, fees, and living expenses) at Roger Williams for the 2026-2027 academic year is $78,920 According to Law School Transparency, if you finance 100% of the estimated cost of attendance with student loans, your total projected cost would be $285,061.

== Clinics and student organizations ==
The Marine Affairs Institute explores the legal, economic, and policy issues raised by the development of the oceans and coastal zone. Students take elective courses in traditional admiralty law and practice, pollution and environmental regulation, coastal zoning, fisheries, and the international law of the sea. The Honors Program is a three-year program of seminars, clinics, and externships. The School of Law operates a Criminal Defense Clinic, an Immigration Clinic, and the Business Start-Up Clinic in Providence. Students may also engage in a semester-long supervised clerkship in a judge's chambers or in a public interest or governmental law office for academic credit. The multicultural mentor program pairs students of color with members of the bench and bar.

The Law School offers over 30 student organizations, including The Association for Public Interest Law, Maritime Law Society, Women's Law Association, the Alliance (LGBT), and the Multicultural Law Student Association.

== Notable alumni ==
- Katherine Kazarian, member of the Rhode Island General Assembly
