= Steven Lima =

American politician

Member of the Rhode Island House of Representatives from the 49th district
- In office January 5, 2021 – January 3, 2023
- Preceded by: Michael Morin
- Succeeded by: Jon D. Brien

Personal details
- Party: Democratic
- Website: stevenlima.com

Steven Lima is an American politician. He was a Democratic member for the 49th district of the Rhode Island House of Representatives.

In 2021 Lima was elected for the 42nd district of the Rhode Island House of Representatives, succeeding Michael Morin. Lima assumed office on January 5, 2021. He lived in Woonsocket, Rhode Island. Lima decided not to seek re-election in 2022.
