= Nicholas Mattiello =

American politician (born 1963)

Nick Mattiello
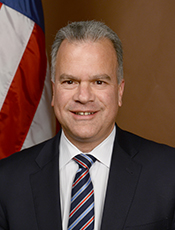

223rd Speaker of the Rhode Island House of Representatives
- In office March 25, 2014 – January 5, 2021
- Deputy: Charlene Lima
- Preceded by: Gordon Fox
- Succeeded by: Joe Shekarchi

Majority Leader of the Rhode Island House of Representatives
- In office February 2010 – March 25, 2014
- Preceded by: Gordon Fox
- Succeeded by: John DeSimone

Member of the Rhode Island House of Representatives from the 15th district
- In office January 2, 2007 – January 5, 2021
- Preceded by: James Davey
- Succeeded by: Barbara Ann Fenton-Fung

Personal details
- Born: May 16, 1963 (age 63) Providence, Rhode Island, U.S.
- Party: Democratic
- Spouse: Mary Ann
- Education: Boston College (BS); Suffolk University (JD)

Nicholas A. Mattiello (born May 16, 1963) is an American politician and Democratic former member of the Rhode Island House of Representatives, who represented the 15th District from 2007 to 2021. He served as the Speaker of the Rhode Island House of Representatives from March 25, 2014 to 2021. In 2020, he was defeated in an upset by Republican Barbara Ann Fenton-Fung, the wife of Cranston mayor Allan Fung.

== Political positions ==
Mattiello has been described as an "old-guard conservative." In 2011, he voted for Rhode Island's voter ID law. Despite his generally conservative profile, he voted for marriage equality in 2013. Mattiello has also expressed the fact that he does not support the bill relating to the Pawtucket Red Sox that was passed in the Senate in January 2018 and states that it was dead. He has expressed his disinterest in the idea of the taxpayer's money funding the new stadium, leading to the team to look outside of Rhode Island. He has been endorsed by Right to Life and the NRA Political Victory Fund.

In 2018, Mattiello sponsored legislation commonly known as "Kristen's Law" that allows life sentencing for anyone who sells, delivers or distributes an illegal drug that leads to a fatal overdose.

In July 2018, the Rhode Island Democratic Party, controlled by Mattiello, endorsed a pro-Trump candidate's primary challenge against incumbent Rep. Moira Walsh, who had voiced her disapproval with Mattiello on previous occasions.

In June 2019, Mattiello attempted to include $1 million in the R.I. budget to be allocated to a single chiropractor, Victor Pedro, despite R.I.'s Medicaid Medical Care Advisory Committee stating that "there wasn’t evidence that the treatment worked." Eventually, Mattiello pulled support for the bill due to public and political pressure.

In June 2020, during the campaign to remove "Plantations" from the official state name of Rhode Island, Mattiello received criticism for not knowing what the holiday Juneteenth commemorated, and making the statement that he "did not think we had actual slavery in Rhode Island." Rhode Island ships were the center of the Transatlantic Slave Trade, importing more enslaved Africans than any other North American British colony.

Rhode Island House of Representatives
Preceded by Gordon Fox	Majority Leader of the Rhode Island House of Representatives; 2010–2014	Succeeded by John DeSimone
Political offices
Preceded by Gordon Fox	Speaker of the Rhode Island House of Representatives; 2014–2021	Succeeded by Joe Shekarchi
