= Michael Chippendale =

Member of the Rhode Island House of Representatives

Minority Leader of the Rhode Island House of Representatives
- Incumbent
- Assumed office June 23, 2022
- Preceded by: Blake Filippi

Minority Whip of the Rhode Island House of Representatives
- In office November 7, 2018 – June 23, 2022
- Preceded by: Blake Filippi
- Succeeded by: David J. Place

Member of the Rhode Island House of Representatives from the 40th district
- Incumbent
- Assumed office January 3, 2011
- Preceded by: Scott M. Pollard

Personal details
- Born: April 25, 1969 (age 57) Providence, Rhode Island, U.S.
- Party: Republican
- Education: Community College of Rhode Island (attended); New England Institute of Technology (AS); Johnson and Wales University (attended)
- Website: Official website

Michael W. Chippendale (born April 25, 1969, in Providence, Rhode Island) is an American politician and a Republican member of the Rhode Island House of Representatives representing District 40 since being elected in November 2010. Chippendale currently serves as the House Minority Leader.

== Education ==
Chippendale attended the Community College of Rhode Island, earned his AS in mechanical engineering technology from New England Institute of Technology, and studied Business Management Johnson & Wales University.

== Professional ==
Chippendale is the CEO and a partner of Intrepid Enterprises, LLC. Intrepid Enterprises is a real-estate management firm in Rhode Island that specializes in the rehabilitation, operation, and management of commercial and residential properties within the state of Rhode Island. Chippendale has been a Real Estate investor since 1992 and also works as a consultant on contract manufacturing jobs in the trade show exhibit, point of purchase display, and custom furniture design, engineering and manufacturing industry. Chippendale has been active in this industry since 2002.

== Political career ==
In 2018 Chippendale was unanimously elected by his Republican Colleagues to serve as House Minority Whip, and was unanimously reelected to that post following the 2020 election where he served with House Minority Leader and former House Minority Whip, Blake Filippi.

Chippendale currently serves on the House Committee on Oversight, the House Committee on Corporations, the House Committee on Conduct and the Permanent Joint Committee on Healthcare Oversight. Past committee assignments include the RI State Lottery Commission, Vice Chairman of House Oversight, Secretary of House Oversight, House Committee on Labor, House Committee on Environment and Natural Resources, House Judiciary Committee and the House Rules Committee.

Temporary appointments included; Chairman of the House Committee to Review and Recommend Changes to the RI Department of Health Medical Board of Licensure and Discipline in 2015, and the COVID Vaccine Task Force in December 2020.

Chippendale became House Minority Leader on June 23, 2022, following Blake Filippi announcing that he would non seek reelection to the position of House Minority Leader and immediately stepped down.

== Elections ==
2024 general election: Rhode Island House of Representatives, District 40
Party	Candidate	Votes	%
Republican	Michael Chippendale	5,964	69.2%
Democratic	Linda Nichols	2,642	30.7%

2022 general election: Rhode Island House of Representatives, District 40
Party	Candidate	Votes	%
Republican	Michael Chippendale	4,368	67.4%
Democratic	Linda Nichols	2,109	32.5%

2020 general election: Rhode Island House of Representatives, District 40
Party	Candidate	Votes	%
Republican	Michael Chippendale	5,545	66.1%
Democratic	Linda Nichols	2,835	33.8%

2018 general election: Rhode Island House of Representatives, District 40
Party	Candidate	Votes	%
Republican	Michael Chippendale	3,776	61.0%
Democratic	Lauren Niedel-Gresh	2,413	39.0%

2016 general election: Rhode Island House of Representatives, District 40
Party	Candidate	Votes	%
Republican	Michael Chippendale	5,002	69.5%
Democratic	Joseph Cardillo	2,185	30.4%

2014 general election: Rhode Island House of Representatives, District 40
Party	Candidate	Votes	%
Republican	Michael Chippendale	3,583	68.1%
Democratic	Joseph Cardillo	1,668	31.7%

2012 general election: Rhode Island House of Representatives, District 40
Party	Candidate	Votes	%
Republican	Michael Chippendale	4,065	58.4%
Democratic	Lauri Archambault	2,883	41.5%

2010 general election: Rhode Island House of Representatives, District 40
Party	Candidate	Votes	%
Democratic	Scott M. Pollard	2,655	44.7%
Republican	Michael Chippendale	3,278	55.3%

Rhode Island House of Representatives
Preceded by Blake Filippi	Minority Leader of the Rhode Island House of Representatives; 2022–present	Incumbent
