= Katherine Kazarian =

Member of the Rhode Island House of Representatives

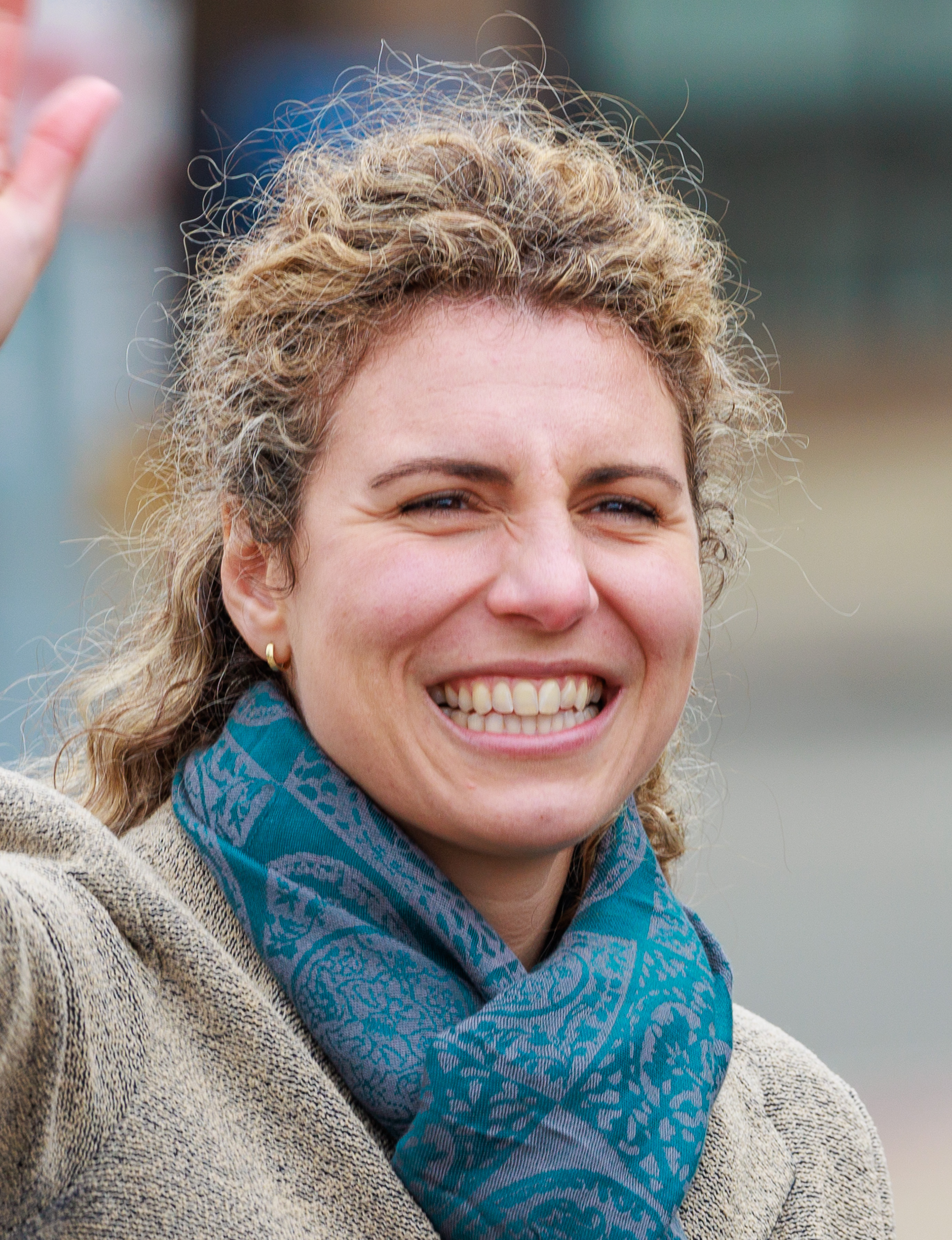
- Kazarian in 2025

Majority Leader of the Rhode Island House of Representatives
- Incumbent
- Assumed office May 7, 2026
- Preceded by: Christopher Blazejewski

Member of the Rhode Island House of Representatives from the 63rd district
- Incumbent
- Assumed office January 1, 2013
- Preceded by: Roberto DaSilva

Personal details
- Born: June 25, 1990 (age 36) East Providence, Rhode Island, U.S.
- Party: Democratic
- Education: Columbia University (BA); Roger Williams University (JD)
- Website: Campaign website

Katherine S. Kazarian (born June 25, 1990 in East Providence, Rhode Island) is an American politician and a Democratic member of the Rhode Island House of Representatives representing District 63 since January 1, 2013. She became House Majority Whip in January 2021, and became the first woman to serve as House Majority Leader on May 7, 2026.

== Education ==
Kazarian graduated from St. Mary Academy Bay View in 2008 and earned her bachelor's degree in urban studies and economics from Barnard College of Columbia University in 2012, and holds a J.D. degree from Roger Williams University School of Law.

== Elections ==
- 2012 When District 63 Democratic Representative Roberto DaSilva ran for Rhode Island Senate and left the seat open, Kazarian ran in the four-way September 11, 2012 Democratic Primary, winning with 829 votes (36.7%) and won the November 6, 2012 General election with 4,227 votes (69.7%) against Independent candidate David Sullivan.

Rhode Island House of Representatives
Preceded by Christopher Blazejewski	Majority Leader of the Rhode Island House of Representatives; 2026–present	Incumbent
