= Stephen Casey =

American politician (born 1968)

Member of the Rhode Island House of Representatives from the 50th district
- Incumbent
- Assumed office January 1, 2013
- Preceded by: Jon D. Brien

Personal details
- Born: September 12, 1968 (age 58)
- Party: Democratic
- Education: Boston College (BA)

Stephen M. Casey (born September 12, 1968) is an American politician and a Democratic member of the Rhode Island House of Representatives representing District 50 since January 1, 2013.

== Education ==
Casey earned his bachelor's degree in communications from Boston College.

== Elections ==
In 2012, Casey challenged District 50 incumbent Democratic Representative Jon D. Brien in the September 11, 2012 Democratic Primary, winning by 52 votes with 722 votes (51.9%), and then he ran unopposed for the November 6, 2012 General election, winning with 2,749 votes.
