= Christopher Blazejewski =

Member of the Rhode Island House of Representatives

Chris Blazejewski

Speaker of the Rhode Island House of Representatives
- Incumbent
- Assumed office May 7, 2026
- Preceded by: Joe Shekarchi

Majority Leader of the Rhode Island House of Representatives
- In office January 5, 2021 – May 7, 2026
- Preceded by: Joe Shekarchi
- Succeeded by: Katherine Kazarian

Member of the Rhode Island House of Representatives from the 2nd district
- Incumbent
- Assumed office January 4, 2011
- Preceded by: David Segal

Personal details
- Born: December 3, 1979 (age 46)
- Party: Democratic
- Spouse: Ami Gada
- Children: 2
- Education: Harvard University (BA, JD)
- Website: Official website

Christopher R. Blazejewski (born December 3, 1979) is an American lawyer and politician serving as the Speaker of the Rhode Island House of Representatives since May 7, 2026. Blazejewski was first elected to the Rhode Island legislature from District 2 in January 2011. He served as deputy whip until 2021 when he was elected majority leader. Blazejewski is a progressive Democrat.

== Early life and education ==
Blazejewski was raised in Cumberland, Rhode Island and attended Cumberland High School. He graduated from Harvard University with a bachelor's degree in 2002. While an undergraduate, he wrote for The Harvard Crimson. Blazejewski obtained his JD from Harvard Law School.

== Career ==
Blazejewski first ran for the Rhode Island House of Representatives from District 2, after David Segal ran for United States House of Representatives in Rhode Island's 1st congressional district. In the Democratic primary on September 23, 2010, Shekarchi won 1,029 votes (71.7%) before defeating independent candidate Richard Rodi in the general election on November 2, 2010. He was deputy whip until 2021, when he became Majority Leader.

After House Speaker Joe Shekarchi announced his resignation on May 7, 2026, to apply for a seat on the Rhode Island Supreme Court, Blazejewski was elected 65-10 to serve as the next speaker of the Rhode Island House of Representatives. He was succeeded as Majority Leader by Katherine Kazarian.

As of 2026, Blazejewski is a partner at the Boston-based law firm Sherin and Lodgen.

== Personal life ==
Blazejewski and his wife Ami live in Providence. They have two children.

Rhode Island House of Representatives
| Preceded by Joe Shekarchi | Majority Leader of the Rhode Island House of Representatives; 2021–2026 | Succeeded by Katherine Kazarian |
Political offices
| Preceded by Joe Shekarchi | Speaker of the Rhode Island House of Representatives; 2026–present | Incumbent |
