= Rhode Island Republican Party =

Rhode Island affiliate of the Republican Party

- Chairperson: Allyn Meyers
- Senate Leader: Jessica de la Cruz
- House Leader: Michael Chippendale
- Founded: 1854
- Headquarters: 1800 Post Rd., Suite 17-I; Warwick, Rhode Island 02886
- Membership (2021): 112,334
- Ideology: Conservatism
- National affiliation: Republican Party
- Colors: Red (unofficial)
- Seats in the U.S. Senate: 0 / 2
- Seats in the U.S. House: 0 / 2
- Statewide executive offices: 0 / 5
- Seats in the State Senate: 5 / 38
- Seats in the State House: 9 / 75
- Other elected officials: 91

Election symbol

Website
- ri.gop

The Rhode Island Republican Party is the affiliate of the United States Republican Party in Rhode Island.

== Elected officials ==
=== Members of Congress ===
==== U.S. Senate ====
- None

Both of Rhode Island's U.S. Senate seats have been held by Democrats since 2007. Lincoln Chafee was the last Republican to represent Rhode Island in the U.S. Senate. First elected in 2000, Chafee lost his bid for a second term in 2006 to Sheldon Whitehouse who has held the seat since.

==== U.S. House of Representatives ====
- None

Both of Rhode Island's U.S. House seats have been held by Democrats since 1995. The last Republican to represent Rhode Island in the House of Representatives was Ronald Machtley. First elected in 1988, Machtley opted not to run for re-election in 1994, instead unsuccessfully running for the Republican nomination for Governor. Kevin Vigilante ran as the Republican nominee in the 1994 election and was subsequently defeated by Democratic challenger Patrick J. Kennedy.

=== Statewide offices ===
- None

Rhode Island has not elected any GOP candidates to statewide office since 2006, when Donald Carcieri was re-elected as governor. In 2010, term limits prevented Carcieri from seeking a third term. Businessman John Robitaille ran as the Republican nominee in the 2010 election and was subsequently defeated by Independent challenger Lincoln Chafee.

=== Legislative ===
- Senate Minority Leader: Jessica de la Cruz
- House Minority Leader: Michael Chippendale

=== Local ===
- Cranston
  - Ken Hopkins, Mayor
- Town Councils
  - 58 out of 182 possible seats - 32%
- School Board Committee Members
  - 22 out of 64 possible seats - 34%
- Town Executives
  - 10 out of 25 possible seats - 40%
