= 2022 Rhode Island elections =

- November 8, 2022

A general election was held in the U.S. state of Rhode Island on November 8, 2022. All of Rhode Island's executive officers were up for election as well as both of Rhode Island's two seats in the United States House of Representatives.
