= Deb Ruggiero =

American politician

Member of the Rhode Island House of Representatives from the 74th district
- In office January 6, 2009 – January 3, 2023
- Preceded by: Bruce Long
- Succeeded by: Alex Finkelman

Personal details
- Born: April 2, 1958 (age 68) Providence, Rhode Island, U.S.
- Party: Democratic
- Domestic partner: Joyce Ioanes (deceased 2007)
- Education: Boston College (BA)
- Website: Campaign website

Deborah L. "Deb" Ruggiero (born April 2, 1958) is an American radio personality and politician from Jamestown, Rhode Island. A Democrat, she served in the Rhode Island House of Representatives, representing the 74th district, which contains all of Jamestown and part of Middletown. Ruggiero was first elected in November 2008 and took office on January 6, 2009.

== Early life and education ==
Born in Providence, Rhode Island, Ruggiero went to high school in Lincoln, Rhode Island before attending Boston College, graduating magna cum laude with a double major in English and communications.

== Career ==
In 2008, Ruggiero challenged 28-year incumbent Bruce J. Long for the 74th district seat. Long, a Republican, was the longest-serving member of the House of Representatives and was seeking his fifteenth term. In the election held on November 4, 2008, Ruggiero defeated Long by 54% to 46%, carrying each of the district's six precincts. She was re-elected in 2010, winning 53% in a three-way race. Her Republican and Independent opponents took 31% and 16% of the vote respectively.

She has spent her career in the media, working first for CBS radio in Boston, then for FOX TV and WPRI-TV for eight years. Since 2000, she has served as director of community and business development at Citadel Radio, the owners of WPRO and WPRO-FM. Since 1992, she has also taught a class in broadcast advertising at Providence College.

A supporter of the Hillary Clinton 2008 presidential campaign, Ruggiero attended the 2008 Democratic National Convention in Denver as an alternate elector.

In April 2022, Ruggiero declared her candidacy for lieutenant governor of Rhode Island.

== Personal life ==
Ruggiero is a lesbian; her partner of over 22 years, Joyce Ioanes, died of cancer in 2007.
