= Joe Shekarchi =

American politician

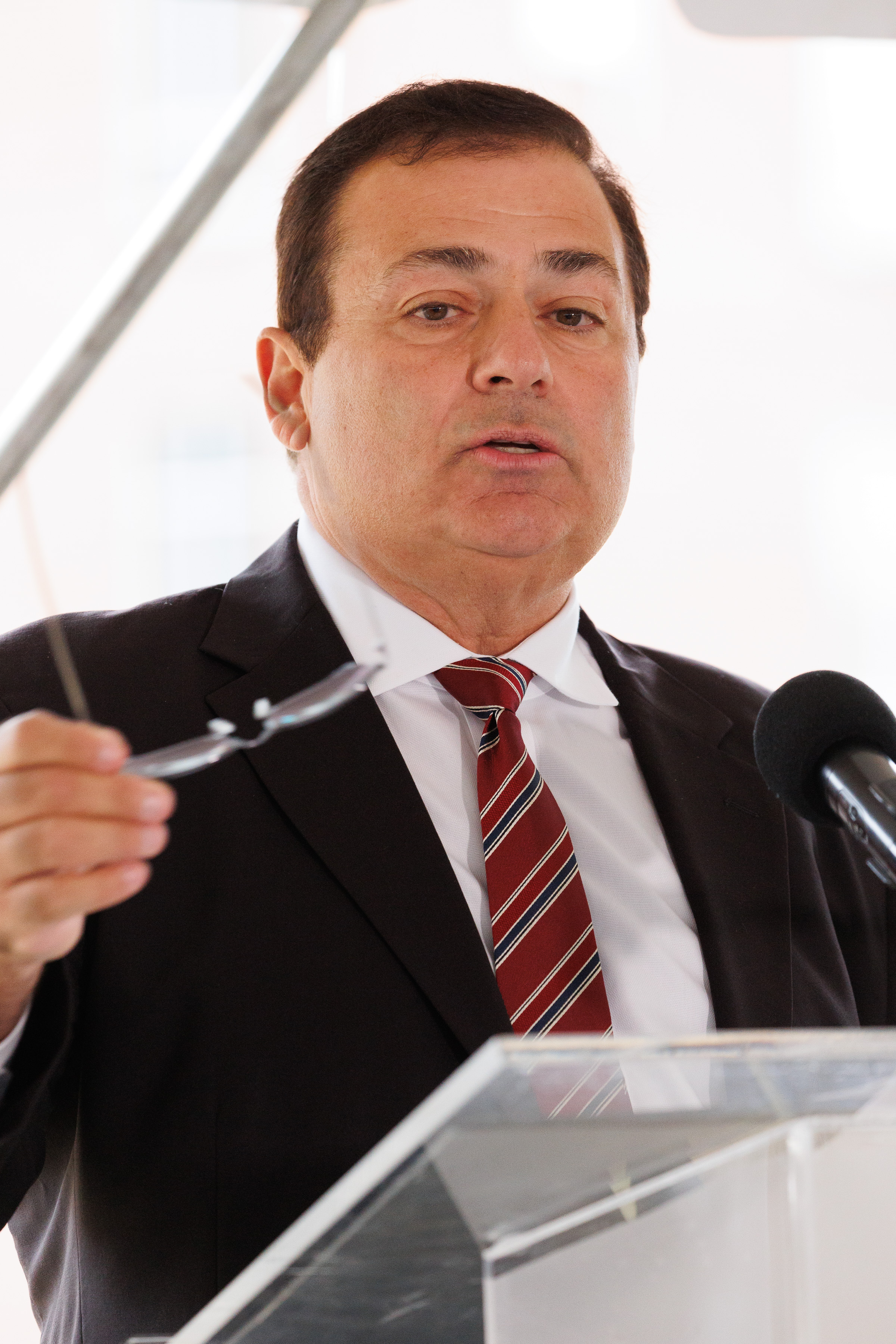

224th Speaker of the Rhode Island House of Representatives
- In office January 5, 2021 – May 7, 2026
- Preceded by: Nicholas Mattiello
- Succeeded by: Christopher Blazejewski

Majority Leader of the Rhode Island House of Representatives
- In office January 3, 2017 – January 5, 2021
- Preceded by: John DeSimone
- Succeeded by: Christopher Blazejewski

Member of the Rhode Island House of Representatives from the 23rd district
- Incumbent
- Assumed office January 1, 2013
- Preceded by: Robert Flaherty

Personal details
- Born: May 17, 1962 (age 64)
- Party: Democratic
- Education: Suffolk University (BA, JD)
- Website: Official website

K. Joseph Shekarchi (born May 17, 1962) is an American politician who serves as a member of the Rhode Island House of Representatives. A Democrat, he has represented District 23 in Warwick since January 1, 2013. He was chairman of the House Labor Committee until his election as the House Majority Leader in November 2016. After four years as majority leader, Shekarchi was elected speaker in November 2020 following the defeat of longtime speaker Nicholas Mattiello. He announced his resignation from the speakership on May 7, 2026, to pursue a seat on the Rhode Island Supreme Court. Shekarchi considers himself a moderate Democrat.

== Early life and education ==
Shekarchi was born to a father of Iranian-American descent and a mother of Italian-American heritage. He grew up in the Conimicut neighborhood of Warwick. He earned his bachelor's degree from Suffolk University and his Juris Doctor from the Suffolk University Law School in Boston, Massachusetts. He attended Mount St. Charles Academy in Woonsocket, Rhode Island, prior to attending Suffolk.

== Career ==
Shekarchi was the manager of Paul Tsongas's Rhode Island campaign for the 1992 Democratic Party presidential primaries and then served as a legislative aide in the administration of governor Bruce Sundlun. In 2010, he led future governor Gina Raimondo's successful campaign for general treasurer.

When Robert Flaherty, the incumbent Democratic representative for District 23 in Warwick, failed to qualify for the ballot, Shekarchi was unopposed for the September 11, 2012, Democratic Primary, winning with 536 votes. He won the November 6, 2012, General election with 4,302 votes (67.9%) against Republican nominee John Falkowski, and has served in the position since January 1, 2013.

Shekarchi was chairman of the House Labor Committee until his Democratic colleagues elected him as the House majority leader in November 2016. After four years as majority leader, his colleagues elected him speaker in November 2020 following the defeat of longtime speaker Nicholas Mattiello. Shekarchi considers himself a moderate Democrat.

Shekarchi resigned the speakership on May 7, 2026, the due date for applications for a vacancy on the Rhode Island Supreme Court. He was succeeded by Christopher Blazejewski.

== Personal life ==
Shekarchi is openly gay. He is the second openly gay speaker of the Rhode Island House, after Gordon Fox.

Rhode Island House of Representatives
Preceded by John DeSimone	Majority Leader of the Rhode Island House of Representatives; 2017–2021	Succeeded by Christopher Blazejewski
Political offices
Preceded by Nicholas Mattiello	Speaker of the Rhode Island House of Representatives; 2021–2026	Succeeded by Christopher Blazejewski
