= 2026 Rhode Island Senate election =

- November 3, 2026

All 38 seats in the Rhode Island Senate 20 seats needed for a majority

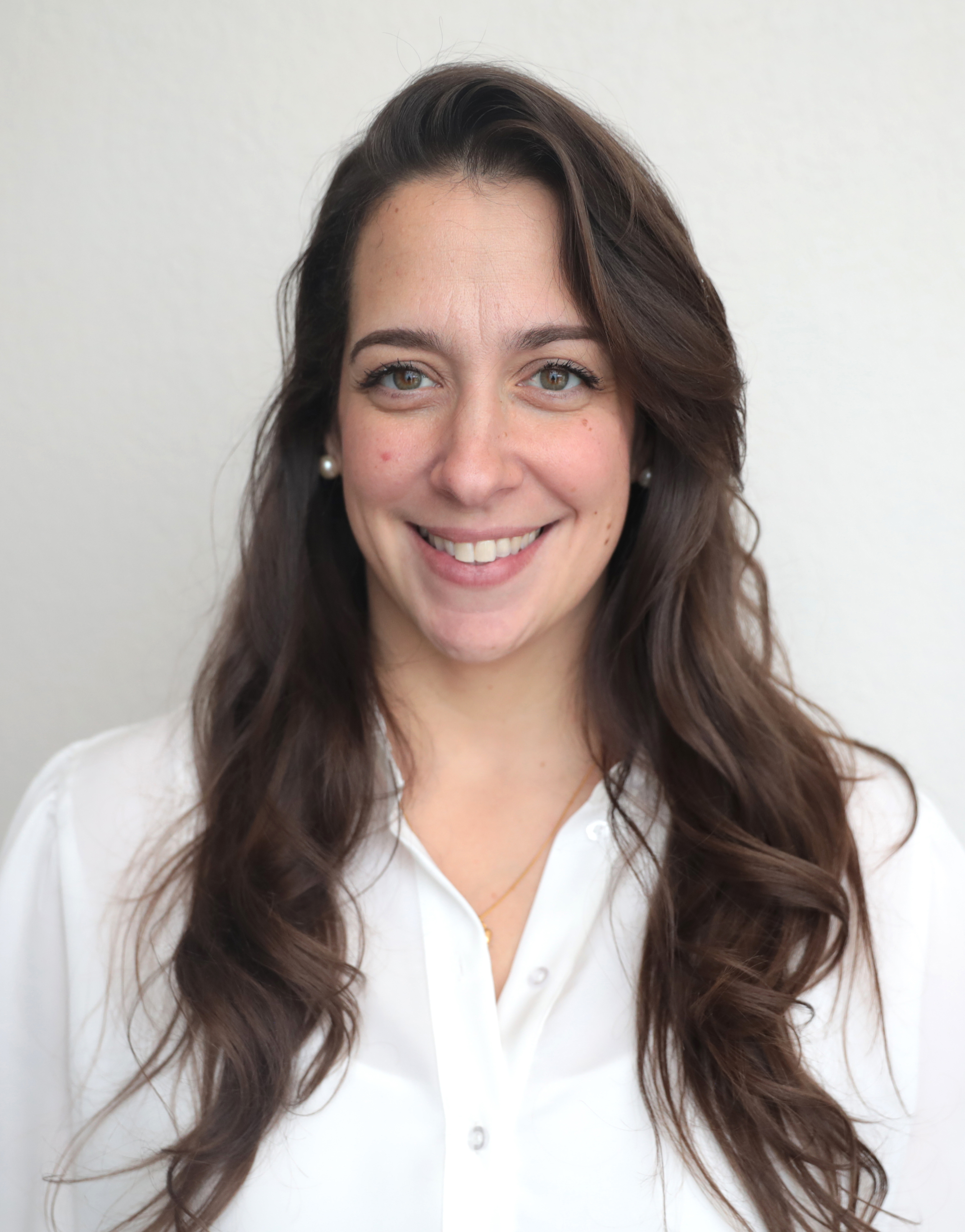
	Majority party	Minority party
Leader	Frank Ciccone	Jessica de la Cruz
Party	Democratic	Republican
Leader since	29 April 2025	August 2, 2022
Leader's seat	7–Providence	23–North Smithfield
Last election	34 seats, 72.8%	4 seats, 22.6%
Seats before	34	4
Seats won	36	2
Seat change	▲2	▼2
- Democratic gain Democratic hold Republican hold Democrats: 40–50% 50–60% 60–70% 80–90% 90–100% Republicans: 90–100%
President before election
Valarie Lawson
Democratic
Elected President
TBD

The 2026 Rhode Island Senate election was held on Tuesday, November 3, 2026, with party primaries on Wednesday, September 9, 2026. Rhode Island voters elected 38 representatives to serve two-year terms in the Rhode Island Senate.

Democrats gained two seats from the previous election, winning 36 seats, while the Republicans won two contests. Democrats won every seat they contested.

The election took place in tandem with elections for the governor, lieutenant governor, U.S. Senate, U.S. House, and the state house.

== 2025–2026 special elections ==
=== District 4: August 5, 2025 ===
2025 District 4 special election
- August 5, 2025
Candidate	Stefano Famiglietti	Alex Asermely
Party	Democratic	Republican
Popular vote	1,706	333
Percentage	83.02%	16.20
Senator before election
Dominick J. Ruggerio
Democratic
Elected Senator
Stefano Famiglietti
Democratic

A special election for Senate District 4 took take place on August 5, 2025, with the primary taking place July 8. The vacancy was caused by the death of Senate President Dominick J. Ruggerio from cancer on the morning of 21 April 2025. He had represented the 4th district since 2005, but served in the legislature continuously since 1981. He served as majority leader from 2009 to 2017, and served as President of the Rhode Island Senate from 2017 until his death. Valarie Lawson was chosen to succeed Ruggerio as Senate President. Stefano Famiglietti won both the primary and general election.

Senate District 4 represents portions of the municipalities of North Providence and Providence. As of July 2025, registered voters affiliated with the Democratic Party heavily outnumber registered Republicans. Of the 21,169 registered voters, 9,519 or 45.0% are registered Democrats, 2,356 or 11.1% are registered Republicans, and 9,294 or 43.9% have no partisan affiliation.

==== Democratic primary ====
===== Nominee =====
- Stefano Famiglietti, North Providence Councilmember from the 2nd district

===== Eliminated in primary =====
- Lenny Cioe, nurse and candidate for this seat in 2020, 2022, and 2024
- Marcia Ranglin-Vassell, former state representative from the 5th district (2017-2023)
- Manny Taveras, account executive and brother of former Mayor of Providence Angel Taveras

===== Endorsements =====
Stefano Famiglietti

State legislators

- Frank Ciccone, Majority Leader of the Rhode Island Senate (2025–present) from the 7th district (2005–present)

Labor unions

- Rhode Island AFL-CIO

===== Results =====
Democratic primary results by ward: Famiglietti: 60–70%; 80–90%; Ranglin-Vassell: 50–60%

Democratic primary results
Party	Candidate	Votes	%
Democratic	Stefano Famiglietti	1,664	68.06%
Democratic	Marcia Ranglin-Vassell	382	15.62%
Democratic	Lenny Cioe	281	11.49%
Democratic	Manny Taveras	118	4.83%
Total votes		2,445	100.00%

==== Republican nominee ====
Attorney Alex Asermely was the only Republican candidate to file.

==== Independent and third party candidates ====
===== Withdrawn =====
- Stephen Tocco, former Smithfield Councilmember, Democratic candidate for this district in 2022, and perennial candidate

==== General election ====
===== Results =====
General election
Party	Candidate	Votes	%
Democratic	Stefano Famiglietti	1,706	83.02%
Republican	Alex Asermely	333	16.20%
Write-in		16	0.78%
Total votes		2,055	100.00%

== Summary ==
=== Predictions ===
Source	Ranking	As of
Sabato's Crystal Ball	Safe D	January 22, 2026
State Navigate	Safe D	October 24, 2026

=== Incumbents by State Senate district ===
Senate district	Incumbent	Party	Elected Senator	Party
1	Jake Bissaillon	Dem	TBD	
2	Ana Quezada	Dem	TBD	
3	Sam Zurier	Dem	TBD	
4	Stefano Famiglietti	Dem	TBD	
5	Sam Bell	Dem	TBD	
6	Tiara Mack	Dem	TBD	
7	Frank Ciccone	Dem	TBD	
8	Lori Urso	Dem	TBD	
9	John Burke	Dem	TBD	
10	Walter Felag	Dem	TBD	
11	Linda Ujifusa	Dem	TBD	
12	Louis DiPalma	Dem	TBD	
13	Dawn Euer	Dem	TBD	
14	Valarie Lawson	Dem	TBD	
15	Meghan Kallman	Dem	TBD	
16	Jonathon Acosta	Dem	TBD	
17	Thomas Paolino	Rep	TBD	
18	Robert Britto	Dem	TBD	
19	Ryan W. Pearson	Dem	TBD	
20	Brian Thompson	Dem	TBD	
21	Gordon Rogers	Rep	TBD	
22	David Tikoian	Dem	TBD	
23	Jessica de la Cruz	Rep	TBD	
24	Melissa Murray	Dem	TBD	
25	Andrew Dimitri	Dem	TBD	
26	Todd Patalano	Dem	TBD	
27	Hanna Gallo	Dem	TBD	
28	Lammis Vargas	Dem	TBD	
29	Peter Appollonio Jr.	Dem	TBD	
30	Mark McKenney	Dem	TBD	
31	Matthew LaMountain	Dem	TBD	
32	Pamela J. Lauria	Dem	TBD	
33	Leonidas Raptakis	Dem	TBD	
34	Elaine J. Morgan	Rep	TBD	
35	Bridget Valverde	Dem	TBD	
36	Alana DiMario	Dem	TBD	
37	V. Susan Sosnowski	Dem	TBD	
38	Victoria Gu	Dem	TBD	

== Background ==
2024 Rhode Island Senate election by vote share: Democrats: 90–100% 70–80% 60–70% 50–60% / Republicans: 90–100% 60–70% 50–60%

At the chamber's last election in 2024, Democrats picked up one Senate seat to increase their vote share to 34 out of 38 available. Senate control is likely a foregone conclusion for the Democrats, as Republicans did not field enough candidates to win a majority even if all of their candidates were to win. Of the 38 seats in the Senate, only six races have multiple candidates on the ballot: Districts 5, 14, 17, 33, 34, and 38. Democrats are running without major party opposition in 29 seats, with an independent running in District 14, and Republicans are running without any opposition in 2 seats. Voters still have the option to write-in candidates for the legislature.

=== Crossover seats ===
This is a list of Senate seats that voted for one party in the 2024 presidential election and another in the 2024 Senate election:

District	Senator	Party	First elected	Incumbent vote (2024)	Presidential vote (2024)	Status
9th	John Burke	Democratic	2020	D+86.0	R+1.8	Running for re-election unopposed
17th	Thomas Paolino	Republican	2016	R+16.1	D+0.2	Running for re-election
20th	Brian Thompson	Democratic	2024	D+91.0	R+2.1	Running for re-election unopposed
22nd	David Tikoian	Democratic	2022	D+90.6	R+5.4	Running for re-election unopposed
25th	Andrew Dimitri	Democratic	2024	D+16.5	R+19.0	Running for re-election unopposed
26th	Todd Patalano	Democratic	2024	D+15.5	R+8.6	Running for re-election unopposed
33rd	Leonidas Raptakis	Democratic	2012	D+16.7	R+11.6	Running for re-election

== List of districts ==
Candidates' endorsements by senatorial district party bodies are indicated on the ballot, and will be listed here with an asterisk (*).

== District 1 ==
District 1 Democratic primary
Party	Candidate	Votes	%
Democratic	Jake Bissaillon*	2,356	100.00%
Total votes		2,356	100.00%

District 1 election
Party	Candidate	Votes	%
Democratic	Jake Bissaillon (incumbent)		
Write-in			
Total votes			

== District 2 ==
District 2 Democratic primary
Party	Candidate	Votes	%
Democratic	Ana Quezada*	2,231	100.00%
Total votes		2,231	100.00%

District 2 election
Party	Candidate	Votes	%
Democratic	Ana Quezada (incumbent)		
Write-in			
Total votes			

== District 3 ==
District 3 Democratic primary
Party	Candidate	Votes	%
Democratic	Sam Zurier*	5,443	100.00%
Total votes		5,443	100.00%

District 3 election
Party	Candidate	Votes	%
Democratic	Sam Zurier (incumbent)		
Write-in			
Total votes			

== District 4 ==
District 4 Democratic primary
Party	Candidate	Votes	%
Democratic	Stefano Famiglietti* (incumbent)	3,350	100.00%
Total votes		3,350	100.00%

District 4 election
Party	Candidate	Votes	%
Democratic	Stefano Famiglietti (incumbent)		
Write-in			
Total votes			

== District 5 ==
2026 Rhode Island's 5th Senate district election
Nominee	Sam Bell	William D. Connell Jr.
Party	Democratic	Republican
Incumbent Senator
Sam Bell
Democratic

Senate District 5 is located entirely within Providence. District 5 has been represented by Democrat Sam Bell since the 2018 general election. Bell was re-elected in 2024 by 57.8 percentage points. This election will be a rematch of the 2024 general election.

Democratic presidential nominee Kamala Harris won this district by 50.7 points in 2024.

District 5 Democratic primary
Party	Candidate	Votes	%
Democratic	Sam Bell* (incumbent)	3,926	72.44%
Democratic	Theodore Newcomer Jr.	760	14.02%
Democratic	Cameron Moquin	734	13.54%
Total votes		5,420	100.00%

District 5 Republican primary
Party	Candidate	Votes	%
Republican	William D. Connell Jr.*	158	100.00%
Total votes		158	100.00%

District 5 election
Party	Candidate	Votes	%
Democratic	Sam Bell (incumbent)		
Republican	William D. Connell Jr.		
Write-in			
Total votes			

== District 6 ==
District 6 Democratic primary
Party	Candidate	Votes	%
Democratic	Tiara Mack (incumbent)	3,063	100.00%
Total votes		3,063	100.00%

District 6 election
Party	Candidate	Votes	%
Democratic	Tiara Mack (incumbent)		
Write-in			
Total votes			

== District 7 ==
District 7 Democratic primary
Party	Candidate	Votes	%
Democratic	Frank Ciccone* (incumbent)	1,930	100.00%
Total votes		1,930	100.00%

District 7 election
Party	Candidate	Votes	%
Democratic	Frank Ciccone (incumbent)		
Write-in			
Total votes			

== District 8 ==
District 8 Democratic primary
Party	Candidate	Votes	%
Democratic	Lori Urso* (incumbent)	1,679	58.85%
Democratic	Gena Felix	1,174	41.15%
Total votes		2,853	100.00%

District 8 election
Party	Candidate	Votes	%
Democratic	Lori Urso (incumbent)		
Write-in			
Total votes			

== District 9 ==
District 9 Democratic primary
Party	Candidate	Votes	%
Democratic	John Burke (incumbent)	1,962	100.00%
Total votes		1,962	100.00%

District 9 election
Party	Candidate	Votes	%
Democratic	John Burke (incumbent)		
Write-in			
Total votes			

== District 10 ==
District 10 Democratic primary
Party	Candidate	Votes	%
Democratic	Walter Felag* (incumbent)	2,653	100.00%
Total votes		2,653	100.00%

District 10 election
Party	Candidate	Votes	%
Democratic	Walter Felag (incumbent)		
Write-in			
Total votes			

== District 11 ==
District 11 Democratic primary
Party	Candidate	Votes	%
Democratic	Linda Ujifusa* (incumbent)	2,940	100.00%
Total votes		2,940	100.00%

District 11 election
Party	Candidate	Votes	%
Democratic	Linda Ujifusa (incumbent)		
Write-in			
Total votes			

== District 12 ==
District 12 Democratic primary
Party	Candidate	Votes	%
Democratic	Louis DiPalma* (incumbent)	2,773	100.00%
Total votes		2,773	100.00%

District 12 election
Party	Candidate	Votes	%
Democratic	Louis DiPalma (incumbent)		
Write-in			
Total votes			

== District 13 ==
District 13 Democratic primary
Party	Candidate	Votes	%
Democratic	Dawn Euer* (incumbent)	2,662	67.31%
Democratic	Angela Lima	1,293	32.69%
Total votes		3,955	100.00%

District 13 election
Party	Candidate	Votes	%
Democratic	Dawn Euer (incumbent)		
Write-in			
Total votes			

== District 14 ==
2026 Rhode Island's 14th Senate district election
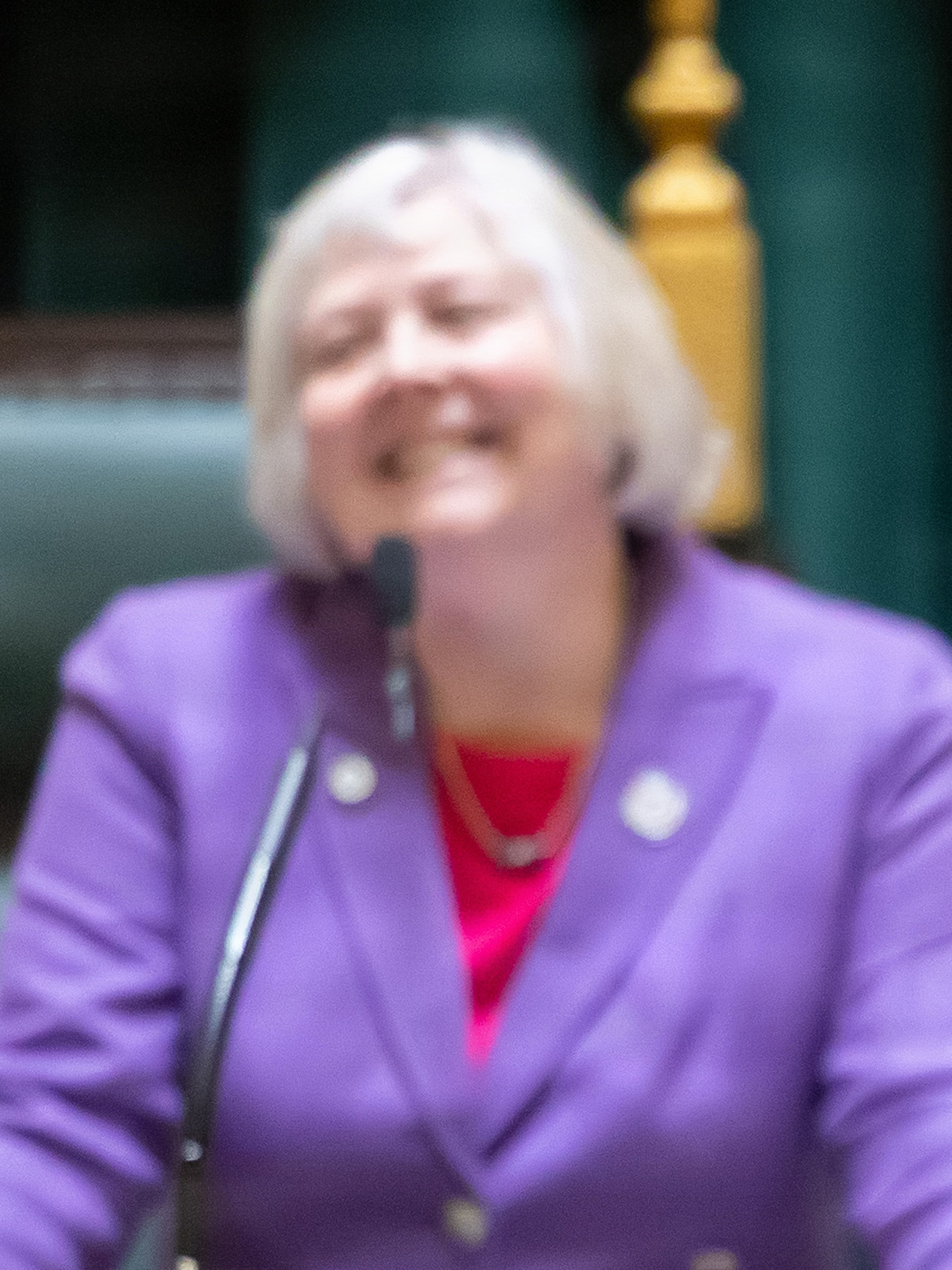

Nominee	Valarie Lawson	Brian Coogan
Party	Democratic	Independent
Incumbent Senator
Valarie Lawson
Democratic

Senate District 14 is located entirely within East Providence. District 14 has been represented by Democrat Valarie Lawson since the 2018 general election. Bell was re-elected in 2024 unopposed. Former Democratic state representative Brian Coogan running against Lawson as an independent.

Democratic presidential nominee Kamala Harris won this district by 21.9 points in 2024.

District 14 Democratic primary
Party	Candidate	Votes	%
Democratic	Valarie Lawson* (incumbent)	2,781	100.00%
Total votes		2,781	100.00%

District 14 election
Party	Candidate	Votes	%
Democratic	Valarie Lawson (incumbent)		
Independent	Brian Coogan		
Write-in			
Total votes			

== District 15 ==
District 15 Democratic primary
Party	Candidate	Votes	%
Democratic	Meghan Kallman* (incumbent)	2,865	71.25%
Democratic	Vanessa Lopez	1,156	28.75%
Total votes		4,021	100.00%

District 15 election
Party	Candidate	Votes	%
Democratic	Meghan Kallman (incumbent)		
Write-in			
Total votes			

== District 16 ==
District 16 Democratic primary
Party	Candidate	Votes	%
Democratic	Jonathon Acosta* (incumbent)	1,053	100.00%
Total votes		1,053	100.00%

District 16 election
Party	Candidate	Votes	%
Democratic	Jonathon Acosta (incumbent)		
Write-in			
Total votes			

== District 17 ==
2026 Rhode Island's 17th Senate district election
Nominee	Thomas Paolino	Nelly Burdette
Party	Republican	Democratic
Incumbent Senator
Thomas Paolino
Republican

Senate District 17 covers parts of northern Rhode Island, containing portions of Lincoln, North Providence, and North Smithfield. District 17 has been represented by Republican Thomas Paolino since the 2016 general election. Paolino was re-elected in 2024 by 16.1 percentage points.

Democratic presidential nominee Kamala Harris won this district by 0.2 points in 2024.

District 17 Republican primary
Party	Candidate	Votes	%
Republican	Thomas Paolino* (incumbent)	639	100.00%
Total votes		639	100.00%

District 17 Democratic primary
Party	Candidate	Votes	%
Democratic	Nelly Burdette	2,560	100.00%
Total votes		2,560	100.00%

District 17 election
Party	Candidate	Votes	%
Democratic	Nelly Burdette	4,851	43.47%
Republican	Thomas Paolino (incumbent)	4,335	38.85%
Independent	Jina N. Petrarca	1,447	12.97%
Independent	John Douglas Barr II	520	4.66%
Write-in		6	0.05%
Total votes		11,159	100.00%

== District 18 ==
District 18 Democratic primary
Party	Candidate	Votes	%
Democratic	Robert Britto* (incumbent)	3,068	100.00%
Total votes		3,068	100.00%

District 18 election
Party	Candidate	Votes	%
Democratic	Robert Britto (incumbent)		
Write-in			
Total votes			

== District 19 ==
District 19 Democratic primary
Party	Candidate	Votes	%
Democratic	Ryan W. Pearson* (incumbent)	2,006	51.85%
Democratic	James Metivier	1,863	48.15%
Total votes		3,869	100.00%

District 19 election
Party	Candidate	Votes	%
Democratic	Ryan W. Pearson (incumbent)		
Write-in			
Total votes			

== District 20 ==
District 20 Democratic primary
Party	Candidate	Votes	%
Democratic	Brian J. Thompson* (incumbent)	1,966	100.00%
Total votes		1,966	100.00%

District 20 election
Party	Candidate	Votes	%
Democratic	Brian J. Thompson (incumbent)		
Write-in			
Total votes			

== District 21 ==
District 21 Republican primary
Party	Candidate	Votes	%
Republican	Gordon Rogers* (incumbent)	1,111	100.00%
Total votes		1,111	100.00%

District 21 election
Party	Candidate	Votes	%
Republican	Gordon Rogers (incumbent)		
Write-in			
Total votes			

== District 22 ==
District 22 Democratic primary
Party	Candidate	Votes	%
Democratic	David Tikoian* (incumbent)	2,596	100.00%
Total votes		2,596	100.00%

District 22 election
Party	Candidate	Votes	%
Democratic	David Tikoian (incumbent)		
Write-in			
Total votes			

== District 23 ==
District 23 Republican primary
Party	Candidate	Votes	%
Republican	Jessica de la Cruz* (incumbent)	1,109	100.00%
Total votes		1,109	100.00%

District 23 election
Party	Candidate	Votes	%
Republican	Jessica de la Cruz (incumbent)		
Write-in			
Total votes			

== District 24 ==
District 24 Democratic primary
Party	Candidate	Votes	%
Democratic	Melissa Murray* (incumbent)	1,319	100.00%
Total votes		1,319	100.00%

District 24 election
Party	Candidate	Votes	%
Democratic	Melissa Murray (incumbent)		
Write-in			
Total votes			

== District 25 ==
District 25 Democratic primary
Party	Candidate	Votes	%
Democratic	Andrew Dimitri* (incumbent)	2,499	100.00%
Total votes		2,499	100.00%

District 25 election
Party	Candidate	Votes	%
Democratic	Andrew Dimitri (incumbent)		
Write-in			
Total votes			

== District 26 ==
District 26 Democratic primary
Party	Candidate	Votes	%
Democratic	Todd Patalano* (incumbent)	2,189	100.00%
Total votes		2,189	100.00%

District 26 election
Party	Candidate	Votes	%
Democratic	Todd Patalano (incumbent)		
Write-in			
Total votes			

== District 27 ==
District 27 Democratic primary
Party	Candidate	Votes	%
Democratic	Hanna Gallo* (incumbent)	3,036	100.00%
Total votes		3,036	100.00%

District 27 election
Party	Candidate	Votes	%
Democratic	Hanna Gallo (incumbent)		
Write-in			
Total votes			

== District 28 ==
District 28 Democratic primary
Party	Candidate	Votes	%
Democratic	Lammis Vargas* (incumbent)	3,255	100.00%
Total votes		3,255	100.00%

District 28 election
Party	Candidate	Votes	%
Democratic	Lammis Vargas (incumbent)		
Write-in			
Total votes			

== District 29 ==
District 29 Democratic primary
Party	Candidate	Votes	%
Democratic	Peter Appollonio Jr.* (incumbent)	2,495	100.00%
Total votes		2,495	100.00%

District 29 election
Party	Candidate	Votes	%
Democratic	Peter Appollonio Jr. (incumbent)		
Write-in			
Total votes			

== District 30 ==
District 30 Democratic primary
Party	Candidate	Votes	%
Democratic	Mark McKenney* (incumbent)	3,347	100.00%
Total votes		3,347	100.00%

District 30 election
Party	Candidate	Votes	%
Democratic	Mark McKenney (incumbent)		
Write-in			
Total votes			

== District 31 ==
District 31 Democratic primary
Party	Candidate	Votes	%
Democratic	Matthew LaMountain* (incumbent)	3,314	100.00%
Total votes		3,314	100.00%

District 31 election
Party	Candidate	Votes	%
Democratic	Matthew LaMountain (incumbent)		
Write-in			
Total votes			

== District 32 ==
District 32 Democratic primary
Party	Candidate	Votes	%
Democratic	Pamela J. Lauria* (incumbent)	4,520	100.00%
Total votes		4,520	100.00%

District 32 election
Party	Candidate	Votes	%
Democratic	Pamela J. Lauria (incumbent)		
Write-in			
Total votes			

== District 33 ==
2026 Rhode Island's 33rd Senate district election
Nominee	Leonidas Raptakis	James P. Pierson
Party	Democratic	Republican
Incumbent Senator
Leonidas Raptakis
Democratic

Senate District 33 is located within Kent County, containing portions of Coventry and West Greenwich. District 33 has been represented by Democrat Leonidas Raptakis since the 2012 general election. Raptakis was re-elected in 2024 by 16.7 percentage points. This election will be a rematch of the 2024 election.

Republican presidential nominee Donald Trump won this district by 11.6 points in 2024.

District 33 Democratic primary
Party	Candidate	Votes	%
Democratic	Leonidas Raptakis* (incumbent)	2,174	100.00%
Total votes		2,174	100.00%

District 33 Republican primary
Party	Candidate	Votes	%
Republican	James P. Pierson*	901	100.00%
Total votes		901	100.00%

District 33 election
Party	Candidate	Votes	%
Democratic	Leonidas Raptakis (incumbent)		
Republican	James P. Pierson		
Write-in			
Total votes			

== District 34 ==
2026 Rhode Island's 34th Senate district election
Nominee	Elaine J. Morgan	Samantha R. Wilcox
Party	Republican	Democratic
Incumbent Senator
Elaine J. Morgan
Republican

Senate District 34 covers parts of southwest Rhode Island, containing all of Exeter, Hopkinton and Richmond, and parts of Charlestown and West Greenwich. District 34 has been represented by Republican Elaine J. Morgan since the 2014 general election. Morgan was re-elected in 2024 by 7.1 percentage points.

Republican presidential nominee Donald Trump won this district by 4.4 points in 2024.

District 34 Republican primary
Party	Candidate	Votes	%
Republican	Elaine J. Morgan* (incumbent)	1,120	100.00%
Total votes		1,120	100.00%

District 34 Democratic primary
Party	Candidate	Votes	%
Democratic	Samantha R. Wilcox*	2,746	100.00%
Total votes		2,746	100.00%

District 34 election
Party	Candidate	Votes	%
Republican	Elaine J. Morgan (incumbent)		
Democratic	Samantha R. Wilcox		
Write-in			
Total votes			

== District 35 ==
District 35 Democratic primary
Party	Candidate	Votes	%
Democratic	Bridget Valverde* (incumbent)	3,768	100.00%
Total votes		3,768	100.00%

District 35 election
Party	Candidate	Votes	%
Democratic	Bridget Valverde (incumbent)		
Write-in			
Total votes			

== District 36 ==
District 36 Democratic primary
Party	Candidate	Votes	%
Democratic	Alana DiMario* (incumbent)	4,241	71.94%
Democratic	Mark Mesrobian	1,654	28.06%
Total votes		5,895	100.00%

District 36 election
Party	Candidate	Votes	%
Democratic	Alana DiMario (incumbent)		
Write-in			
Total votes			

== District 37 ==
District 37 Democratic primary
Party	Candidate	Votes	%
Democratic	V. Susan Sosnowski* (incumbent)	3,386	100.00%
Total votes		3,386	100.00%

District 37 election
Party	Candidate	Votes	%
Democratic	V. Susan Sosnowski (incumbent)		
Write-in			
Total votes			

== District 38 ==
2026 Rhode Island's 38th Senate district election
Nominee	Victoria Gu	Westin J. Place
Party	Democratic	Republican
Incumbent Senator
Victoria Gu
Democratic

Senate District 38 is located in the far southwestern corner of Rhode Island, containing all of Westerly, and parts of Charlestown and South Kingstown. District 38 has been represented by Democrat Victoria Gu since the 2022 general election. Gu was re-elected in 2024 by 16.3 percentage points.

Democratic presidential nominee Kamala Harris won this district by 11.1 points in 2024.

District 38 Democratic primary
Party	Candidate	Votes	%
Democratic	Victoria Gu* (incumbent)	2,905	100.00%
Total votes		2,905	100.00%

District 38 Republican primary
Party	Candidate	Votes	%
Republican	Westin J. Place*	709	100.00%
Total votes		709	100.00%

District 38 election
Party	Candidate	Votes	%
Democratic	Victoria Gu (incumbent)		
Republican	Westin J. Place		
Write-in			
Total votes			

== See also ==
- 2026 United States elections
- 2026 United States Senate election in Rhode Island
- 2026 United States House of Representatives elections in Rhode Island
- 2024 Rhode Island Senate election
- Rhode Island Senate
