= 2026 Rhode Island gubernatorial election =

- November 3, 2026

Nominee	Helena Foulkes	Ken Block	Aaron Guckian
Party	Democratic	Independent	Republican
Popular vote	207,588	99,829	47,402
Percentage	57.71%	27.75%	13.18%
- Foulkes: 30–40% 40–50% 50–60% 60–70% 70–80% 80–90% Block: 30–40% 40–50%
Governor before election
Dan McKee
Democratic
Elected Governor
Helena Foulkes
Democratic

The 2026 Rhode Island gubernatorial election was held on November 3, 2026, to elect the governor of Rhode Island. Incumbent Democratic governor Dan McKee ran for re-election to a second full term but was defeated in the primary by Helena Foulkes. Primary elections took place on September 9, 2026.

Republicans have not won a statewide election in Rhode Island since 2006. While Rhode Island is generally a safely Democratic state, the Democratic primary was predicted to be competitive due to McKee's high unpopularity. The election has also been noted as not following national trends of progressives versus moderates, with both Democrats being relatively moderate and the primary instead largely boiling down to anger over the longtime closure of the Washington Bridge.

This is the first election since 2014 in which an elected state governor lost renomination. (Note: Governor Jeff Colyer of Kansas, who had taken office after the resignation of Sam Brownback, was defeated by Kris Kobach in the 2018 Republican primary election.) It is also the first time since 1994 in which an incumbent governor of Rhode Island lost renomination.

== Democratic primary ==
=== Candidates ===
==== Nominee ====
- Helena Foulkes, former CVS executive, niece of former U.S. senator Chris Dodd, and candidate for governor in 2022

==== Eliminated in primary ====
- Dan McKee, incumbent governor (2021–present)

==== Disqualified ====
- Wil Gregersen, librarian
- Gregory Stevens, restaurateur

==== Declined ====
- Gregg Amore, Rhode Island Secretary of State (2023–present) (running for re-election)
- Alana DiMario, state senator from the 36th district (2021–present)
- Sabina Matos, lieutenant governor of Rhode Island (2021–present) and candidate for Rhode Island's 1st congressional district in 2023 (running for re-election, endorsed McKee)
- Peter Neronha, Rhode Island Attorney General (2019–present) (endorsed Buonanno Foulkes)
- Joe Shekarchi, Speaker of the Rhode Island House of Representatives (2021–2026) from the 23rd district (2013–present)

=== Endorsements ===
Helena Foulkes

U.S representatives

- Patrick J. Kennedy, former RI-01 (1995–2011)
- Nancy Pelosi, former speaker of the House (2007–2011, 2019–2023) from CA-11 (1987–present)

Statewide officials

- Peter Neronha, attorney general of Rhode Island (2019–present)

State legislators

- 12 state senators (Note: Lou DiPalma, 12th district (2009–present); Meghan Kallman, 15th district (2021–present); Pamela Lauria, 32nd district (2023–present); Tiara Mack, 6th district (2021–present); Mark McKenney, 30th district (2019–2021, 2023–present); Melissa Murray, 24th district (2019–present); Ryan Pearson, majority leader (2023–2025) from the 19th district (2013–present); Ana Quezada, 2nd district (2017–present); Brian Thompson, 20th district (2025–present); Linda Ujifusa, 11th district (2023–present); Lammis Vargas, 28th district (2025–present); Sam Zurier, 3rd district (2021–present))
- 18 state representatives (Note: Edith Ajello, 1st district (1993–present); Karen Alzate, 60th district (2019–present); Nathan Biah, 3rd district (2021–present); Jennifer Boylan, 66th district (2023–present); Lauren Carson, 75th district (2015–present); Julie Casimiro, 31st district (2017–present); Terri-Denise Cortvriend, 72nd district (2019–present); Gregory Costantino, 44th district (2013–present); Cherie Cruz, 58th district (2023–present); Grace Diaz, 11th district (2005–present) and former chair of the Rhode Island Democratic Party (2014); Susan Donovan, 69th district (2017–present); Rebecca Kislak, 4th district (2019–present); Michelle McGaw, 71st district (2021–present); Robert Phillips, 51st district (2011–present); Brandon Potter, 16th district (2021–present); Scott Slater, 10th district (2009–present); Jennifer Stewart, 59th district (2023–present); Teresa Tanzi, 34th district (2011–present))

Local officials

- Joseph Polisena Jr., mayor of Johnston (2023–present)

Labor unions

- International Union of Operating Engineers Local 57
- Rhode Island SEIU
- Rhode Island Troopers Association
- UNITE HERE Local 26

Organizations

- Climate Action Rhode Island
- High School Democrats of America

Newspapers

- The Boston Globe
Dan McKee

Statewide officials

- Gregg Amore, secretary of state of Rhode Island (2023–present)
- James Diossa, treasurer of Rhode Island (2023–present)
- Sabina Matos, lieutenant governor of Rhode Island (2021–present)

Local officials

- Roberto DaSilva, mayor of East Providence (2019–present)

Labor unions

- American Federation of State, County and Municipal Employees Rhode Island Council 94
- National Education Association of Rhode Island
- Operative Plasterers' and Cement Masons' International Association Local 40
- Rhode Island Building & Construction Trades Council
- Rhode Island Federation of Teachers and Health Professionals
- Rhode Island State Association of Fire Fighters
- Teamsters Local 251
- United Food and Commercial Workers
- United Nurses and Allied Professionals

Organizations

- Planned Parenthood Votes Rhode Island
Declined to endorse

Party officials

- Liz Beretta-Perik, chair of the Rhode Island Democratic Party (2023–2026)

Political parties

- Rhode Island Democratic Party

Labor unions

- Rhode Island AFL-CIO

=== Debates and forums ===
2026 Rhode Island Democratic gubernatorial primary debates
No.	Date	Host	Moderator	Link	Participants	
P Participant A Absent N Non-invitee I Invitee W Withdrawn						
P Participant A Absent N Non-invitee I Invitee W Withdrawn					Foulkes	McKee
1	Aug 3, 2026	WPRO	Bill Bartholomew	YouTube	P	P
2	Aug 12, 2026	WJAR	Gene Valicenti	YouTube	P	P
3	Aug 18, 2026	WPRI-TV; Rhode Island College	Ted Nesi; Tim White	YouTube	P	P

=== Polling ===
Aggregate polls

Source of poll aggregation	Dates administered	Dates updated	Helena Foulkes	Dan McKee	Gregory Stevens	Other/Undecided (Note: Calculated by taking the difference of 100% and all other candidates combined.)	Margin
270toWin	August 18–27, 2026	August 27, 2026	49.7%	25.3%	—	25.0%	Foulkes +24.4%
Race to the WH	through August 11, 2026	August 19, 2026	46.0%	27.6%	1.3%	25.1%	Foulkes +18.4%
Average			47.9%	26.5%	1.3%	24.3%	Foulkes +21.4%

Poll source	Date(s) administered	Sample size (Note: Key: A – all adults RV – registered voters LV – likely voters V – unclear)	Margin of error	Helena Foulkes	Dan McKee	Gregory Stevens	Other	Undecided
University of New Hampshire	August 20–24, 2026	451 (LV)	± 4.6%	56%	18%	—	2%	23%
Emerson College/WPRI-TV	August 21–22, 2026	528 (LV)	± 4.2%	45%	30%	—	—	24%
Embold Research (Note: Poll sponsored by Pell Center for International Relations and Public Policy.)	August 3–11, 2026	(LV)	—	48%	28%	—	1% (Note: "Would not vote" with 1%)	22%
Tavern Research (D) (Note: Poll commissioned by Working Rhode Island Forward, which supports McKee)	July 10–14, 2026	777 (LV)	—	39%	33%	—	—	28%
University of New Hampshire	June 18–23, 2026	337 (LV)	± 5.0%	42%	22%	1%	4% (Note: Gregerson with 1%; "Another candidate" with 3%)	31%
Emerson College/WPRI-TV	May 14–16, 2026	565 (LV)	± 4.1%	40%	20%	—	3% (Note: "Another candidate" with 3%)	37%
University of New Hampshire	April 16–20, 2026	327 (LV)	± 5.4%	45%	11%	3%	2% (Note: "Another candidate" with 2%)	39%
Expedition Strategies (D)	March 24–29, 2026	800 (LV)	± 3.5%	34%	20%	8%	—	38%
Concord Public Opinion Partners (D) (Note: Poll sponsored by Democrats for Education Reform)	February 28, 2026	319 (LV)	—	24%	15%	3%	—	58%
University of New Hampshire	February 12–16, 2026	364 (LV)	± 5.1%	34%	18%	4%	3%	40%
University of New Hampshire	September 17–23, 2025	275 (LV)	± 5.9%	35%	19%	—	6% (Note: "Someone else" with 6%)	40%

Hypothetical polling

Poll source	Date(s) administered	Sample size	Margin of error	Helena Foulkes	Dan McKee	Peter Neronha	Joe Shekarchi	Other	Undecided
University of New Hampshire	November 13–17, 2025	364 (LV)	± 5.1%	29%	11%	—	13%	6% (Note: 'Write in someone else' with 6%)	42%
URI/YouGov	August 1–18, 2025	500 (A)	± 6.0%	14%	19%	15%	7%	4%	41%

=== Results ===
Primary results by county: Foulkes: 50–60%; 60–70%; 70–80%

Primary results by municipality: Foulkes: 60–70%; 70–80%; 80–90%

Democratic primary results
Party	Candidate	Votes	%
Democratic	Helena Foulkes	81,314	62.5
Democratic	Dan McKee (incumbent)	48,872	37.5
Total votes		130,186	100.0

== Republican primary ==
2022 lieutenant governor nominee Aaron Guckian defeated actress Elaine Pelino for the Republican nomination. Pelino requested a recount, which was approved by the Rhode Island Board of Elections, however it did not change the outcome.

=== Candidates ===
==== Nominee ====
- Aaron Guckian, former chair of the Warwick Sewer Authority and nominee for lieutenant governor in 2022

==== Eliminated in primary ====
- Elaine Pelino, former actress and model

==== Disqualified ====
- Robert Raimondo, businessman and cousin of former Democratic Governor Gina Raimondo

==== Declined ====
- Jessica de la Cruz, minority leader of the Rhode Island Senate (2022–present) from the 23rd district (2019–present) (running for re-election)
- Kenneth Hopkins, mayor of Cranston (2021–present)

=== Endorsements ===
Aaron Guckian

Organizations

- Rhode Island Republican Party

=== Debates and forums ===
2026 Rhode Island Republican gubernatorial primary debates
No.	Date	Host	Moderator	Link	Participants	
P Participant A Absent N Non-invitee I Invitee W Withdrawn						
P Participant A Absent N Non-invitee I Invitee W Withdrawn					Guckian	Pelino
1	Aug 12, 2026	WJAR	Gene Valicenti	YouTube	P	P

=== Polling ===
Poll source	Date(s) administered	Sample size	Margin of error	Aaron Guckian	Elaine Pelino	Robert Raimondo	Other	Undecided
Embold Research	August 3–11, 2026	(LV)	—	17%	37%	—	2% (Note: "Write-in" with 2%)	44%
University of New Hampshire	June 18–23, 2026	145 (LV)	± 8.1%	17%	42%	1%	1% (Note: "Write-in" with 1%)	39%

=== Results ===
Primary results by municipality: Guckian: 50–60%; 60–70%; 70–80%; Pelino: 50–60%; 60–70%

Republican primary results
Party	Candidate	Votes	%
Republican	Aaron Guckian	11,691	50.6
Republican	Elaine Pelino	11,432	49.4
Total votes		23,123	100.0

== Independents ==
=== Candidates ===
==== Declared ====
- Ken Block, founder of the Moderate Party of Rhode Island, Moderate Party nominee for governor in 2010 and Republican candidate in 2014
- Jasjit Gotra, businessman
- CD Reynolds, perennial candidate

==== Did not qualify ====
- Paul Rianna Jr., independent candidate for governor in 2022
- Julian J. Smith, photographer (previously ran for Rhode Island’s 1st congressional district)

==== Declined ====
- Helena Buonanno Foulkes, former CVS executive, candidate for governor in 2022, granddaughter of former U.S. senator Thomas Dodd and niece of former U.S. senator Chris Dodd (running as a Democrat)

== General election ==
=== Predictions ===
Source	Ranking	As of
The Cook Political Report	Solid D	October 29, 2026
Decision Desk HQ	Safe D	November 3, 2026
Fox News	Solid D	November 1, 2026
Inside Elections	Solid D	October 29, 2026
NBC News	Solid D	November 3, 2026
RealClearPolitics	Solid D	November 1, 2026
Sabato's Crystal Ball	Safe D	November 2, 2026
Silver Bulletin	Solid D	November 3, 2026

=== Endorsements ===
Ken Block (I)

Party officials

- Andrew Yang, chair of the Forward Party (2022–present) and 2020 presidential candidate (Forward)

Individuals

- Elaine Pelino, former gubernatorial candidate (Republican)

Political parties

- Forward Party
- Reform Party
Helena Foulkes (D)

Executive branch officials

- Barack Obama, former president of the United States (2009–2017)

Organizations

- EMILYs List
- Rhode Island Coalition Against Gun Violence (RICAGV)

=== Polling ===
Poll source	Date(s) administered	Sample size	Margin of error	Helena Foulkes (D)	Aaron Guckian (R)	Ken Block (I)	Other	Undecided
University of New Hampshire	October 27–31, 2026	753 (LV)	± 3.6%	55%	8%	34%	2% (Note: CD Reynolds (I) and Jasjit Gotra (I) with 1%; "Another candidate" with <1%)	2%
Emerson College/WPRI-TV	October 8–11, 2026	800 (LV)	± 3.5%	48% (Note: With voters who lean towards a given candidate)	12%	38%	2% (Note: Gotra (I) with 1%; Reynolds (I) with 1%)	—
Emerson College/WPRI-TV	October 8–11, 2026	800 (LV)	± 3.5%	44%	10%	35%	2%	9%
Embold Research	October 5–8, 2026	815 (LV)	± 3.6%	39%	17%	28%	1% (Note: Gotra (I) with 1%)	13%
Opinion Diagnostics (Note: Poll sponsored by Block's campaign.)	September 23–25, 2026	800 (LV)	± 3.5%	41%	19%	24%	—	16%
Opinion Diagnostics	September 23–25, 2026	800 (LV)	± 3.5%	39%	—	44%	—	17%
University of New Hampshire	September 17–21, 2026	598 (LV)	± 4.0%	44%	17%	25%	4% (Note: CD Reynolds and "Another candidate" with 2%; Jasjit Gotra with 0%)	10%
	September 9, 2026	Primary elections						
University of New Hampshire	August 20–24, 2026	750 (LV)	± 3.6%	40%	15%	19%	6% (Note: "Write in someone else" and Jasjit Gotra with 3%; CD Reynolds with 0%)	19%
Emerson College/WPRI-TV	August 21–22, 2026	1,000 (LV)	± 3.0%	45%	18%	21%	2%	14%
University of New Hampshire	June 18–23, 2026	664 (LV)	± 3.9%	38%	22%	19%	—	21%
Opinion Diagnostics	April 13–16, 2026	802 (LV)	—	33%	16%	18%	—	33%

Hypothetical polling

Helena Foulkes vs. Elaine Pelino vs. Ken Block

Poll source	Date(s) administered	Sample size	Margin of error	Helena Foulkes (D)	Elaine Pelino (R)	Ken Block (I)	Other	Undecided
University of New Hampshire	August 20–24, 2026	750 (LV)	± 3.6%	42%	20%	18%	4% (Note: "Write in someone else" with 2%; CD Reynolds and Jasjit Gotra with 1%)	17%

Dan McKee vs. Aaron Guckian vs. Ken Block

Poll source	Date(s) administered	Sample size	Margin of error	Dan McKee (D)	Aaron Guckian (R)	Ken Block (I)	Other	Undecided
University of New Hampshire	August 20–24, 2026	750 (LV)	± 3.6%	27%	17%	26%	10% (Note: "Write in someone else" with 6%; Jasjit Gotra with 3%; CD Reynolds with 1%)	20%
Emerson College/WPRI-TV	August 21–22, 2026	1,000 (LV)	± 3.0%	36%	17%	26%	3%	19%
University of New Hampshire	June 18–23, 2026	664 (LV)	± 3.9%	27%	23%	27%	—	23%
Opinion Diagnostics	April 13–16, 2026	802 (LV)	—	28%	15%	20%	—	37%

Dan McKee vs. Elaine Pelino vs. Ken Block

Poll source	Date(s) administered	Sample size	Margin of error	Dan McKee (D)	Elaine Pelino (R)	Ken Block (I)	Other	Undecided
University of New Hampshire	August 20–24, 2026	750 (LV)	± 3.6%	26%	19%	25%	9% (Note: "Write in someone else" with 5%; Jasjit Gotra with 3%; CD Reynolds with 1%)	20%

Helena Foulkes vs. Republican nominee vs. Ken Block

Poll source	Date(s) administered	Sample size	Margin of error	Helena Foulkes (D)	Republican nominee	Ken Block (I)	Other	Undecided
University of New Hampshire	June 18–23, 2026	664 (LV)	± 3.9%	38%	22%	19%	1% (Note: "Write in" with 1%)	20%
Emerson College/WPRI-TV	May 14–16, 2026	1,000 (LV)	± 3.0%	39%	21%	19%	3% (Note: "Someone else" with 6%)	19%

Dan McKee vs. Republican nominee vs. Ken Block

Poll source	Date(s) administered	Sample size	Margin of error	Dan McKee (D)	Republican nominee	Ken Block (I)	Other	Undecided
University of New Hampshire	June 18–23, 2026	664 (LV)	± 3.9%	27%	23%	27%	2% (Note: "Write in" with 2%)	21%
Emerson College/WPRI-TV	May 14–16, 2026	1,000 (LV)	± 3.0%	33%	23%	22%	6% (Note: "Someone else" with 6%)	17%

=== Results ===
2026 Rhode Island gubernatorial election
Party	Candidate	Votes	%	±%
Democratic	Helena Buonanno Foulkes	207,588	57.71	
Independent	Kenneth Block	99,829	27.75	
Republican	Aaron C. Guckian	47,402	13.18	
Independent	C.D. Reynolds	2,050	0.57	
Independent	Jasjit S. Gotra	1,674	0.47	
Write-in		1,148	0.32	
Total votes		359,691	100.0	
Democratic hold				

== See also ==
- 2026 United States gubernatorial elections
- 2026 Rhode Island elections

== Notes ==
Partisan clients
