= 2026 Rhode Island lieutenant gubernatorial election =

- November 3, 2026
- Reporting: 98% as of November 6
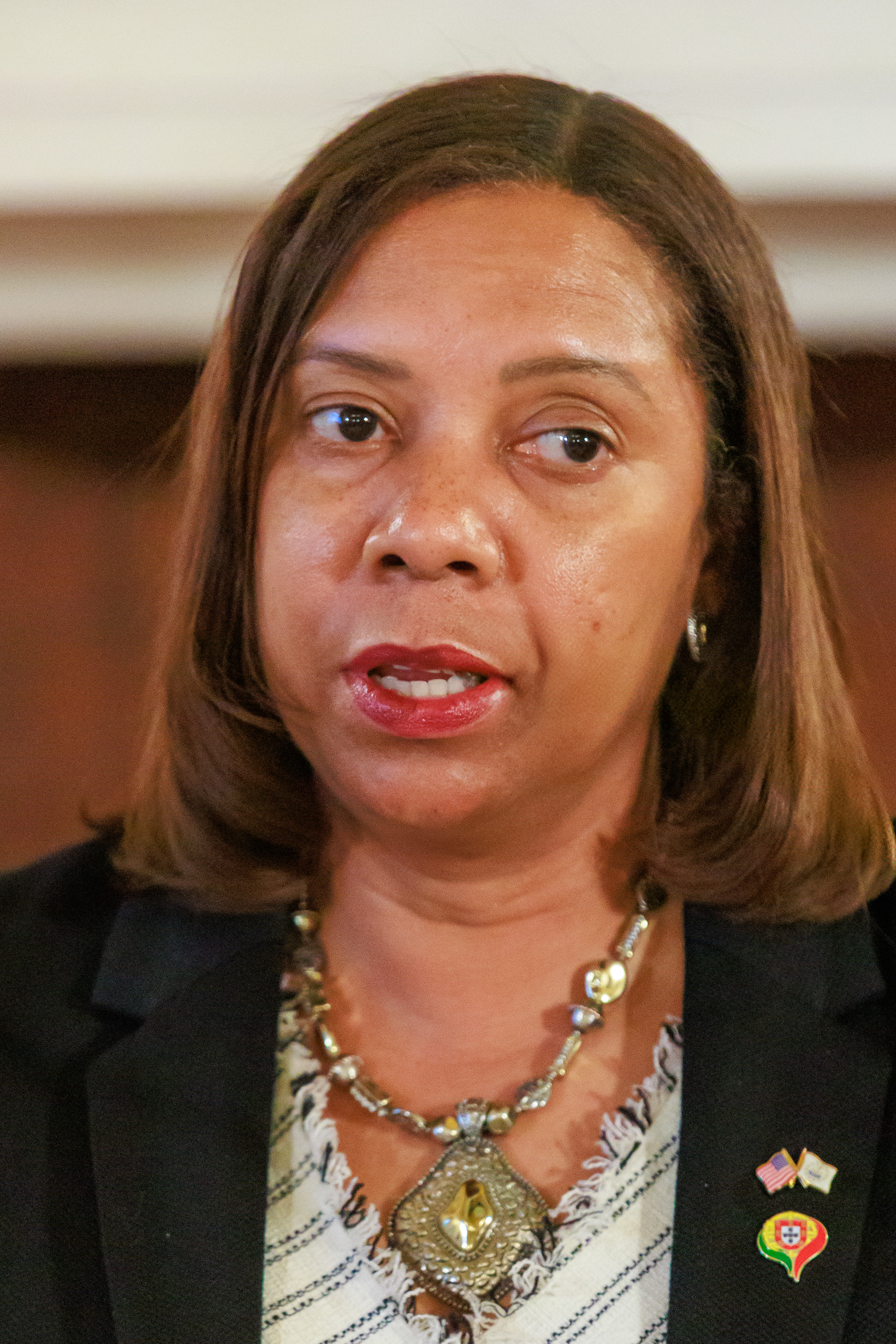

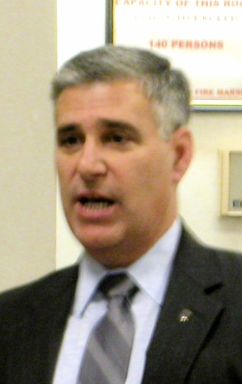
Nominee	Sabina Matos	John Loughlin
Party	Democratic	Republican
Popular vote	211,231	143,802
Percentage	59.3%	40.4%
Lieutenant Governor before election
Sabina Matos
Democratic
Elected Lieutenant Governor
Sabina Matos
Democratic

The 2026 Rhode Island lieutenant gubernatorial election took place on November 3, 2026, to elect the lieutenant governor of Rhode Island. Incumbent Democrat Sabina Matos won reelection for a second full term.

== Democratic primary ==
=== Candidates ===
==== Nominee ====
- Sabina Matos, incumbent lieutenant governor (2021–present)

==== Eliminated in primary ====
- Sue AnderBois, Providence city councilor
- Cynthia Armour Coyne, former state senator from the 32nd district (2014–2023)
- Xay Khamsyvoravong, former mayor of Newport
- Ross McCurdy, independent candidate for lieutenant governor in 2022

==== Withdrawn ====
- Eric Ulis, researcher
- Fred McLin III, former Veterans’ Caseworker and Community Liaison for Congressman Gabe Amo

==== Declined ====
- Bill Bartholomew, radio host
- Don Grebien, mayor of Pawtucket (2011–present) (running for reelection)
- Peter Neronha, attorney general of Rhode Island (2019–present) (endorsed Khamsyvoravong)
- Maria Rivera, mayor of Central Falls (2020–present)

=== Endorsements ===
Sue AnderBois

State legislators

- Alana DiMario, state senator from the 36th district (2021–present)
- 10 current and former state representatives (Note: Edith Ajello, 1st district (1993–present); Jennifer Boylan, 66th district (2023–present); Megan Cotter, 39th district (2023–present); Susan Donovan, 69th district (2017–present); Brandon Potter, 16th district (2021–present); Marcia Ranglin-Vassell, former 5th district (2017–2023); Aaron Regunberg, former 4th district (2015–2019); June Speakman, 68th district (2019–present); Jennifer Stewart, 59th district (2023–present); Teresa Tanzi, 34th district (2011–present))

Individuals

- Bill McKibben, environmentalist, author, and founder of 350.org and Third Act

Organizations

- Climate Action Rhode Island
- Indivisible East Bay
Cynthia Coyne

Labor unions

- International Brotherhood of Police Officers
- National Association of Government Employees Rhode Island
- Rhode Island Association of Fire Fighters
Xay Khamsyvoravong

U.S. representatives

- Gabe Amo, RI-01 (2023–present)

Statewide officials

- Peter Neronha, attorney general of Rhode Island (2019–present)

State legislators

- 2 state senators (Note: Stefano Famiglietti, 4th district (2025–present); Brian Thompson, 20th district (2025–present))
- 2 state representatives (Note: Lauren Carson, 75th district (2015–present); Stephen Casey, 50th district (2013–present))

Local officials

- Joseph Polisena Jr., mayor of Johnston (2023–present)
- Charles M. Holder, mayor of Newport (2025–present)

Labor unions

- Rhode Island Federation of Teachers and Health Professionals

Organizations

- Johnston Democratic Town Committee
Sabina Matos

Executive branch officials

- Pete Buttigieg, former secretary of transportation (2021–2025)

Local officials

- Roberto DaSilva, mayor of East Providence (2019–present)

Labor unions

- AFL-CIO
- United Food and Commercial Workers
- United Nurses and Allied Professionals

Organizations

- Latino Victory
Declined to endorse

Political parties

- Rhode Island Democratic Party

=== Debate ===
2026 Rhode Island lieutenant gubernatorial election Democratic primary debate
No.	Date	Host	Moderator	Link	Democratic	Democratic	Democratic	Democratic
Key: P Participant A Absent N Not invited I Invited W Withdrawn								
Key: P Participant A Absent N Not invited I Invited W Withdrawn					Sue AnderBois	Cynthia Armour Coyne	Xay Khamsyvoravong	Sabina Matos
1	July 31, 2026	WPRI-TV	Ted Nesi; Tim White	YouTube	P	P	P	P

=== Polling ===
Poll source	Date(s) administered	Sample size (Note: Key: A – all adults RV – registered voters LV – likely voters V – unclear)	Margin of error	Sue AnderBois	Cynthia Armour Coyne	Xay Khamsyvoravong	Sabrina Matos	Ross McCurdy	Other	Undecided
University of New Hampshire	August 20–24, 2026	451 (LV)	± 4.6%	8%	5%	22%	20%	2%	1% (Note: "Another candidate" with 1%)	42%
Emerson College/WPRI-TV	August 21–22, 2026	528 (LV)	± 4.2%	8%	9%	18%	20%	4%	–	43%
Embold Research (Note: Poll sponsored by Pell Center for International Relations and Public Policy.)	August 3–11, 2026	(LV)	—	8%	2%	16%	18%	4%	3% (Note: "Would not vote" with 3%)	48%

=== Results ===
Primary results by municipality: Matos: 20–30%; 30–40%; 40–50%; 70–80%; Khamsyvoravong: 30–40%; 40–50%; 50–60%; McCurdy: 20–30%

Democratic primary results
Party	Candidate	Votes	%
Democratic	Sabina Matos (incumbent)	46,914	37.6
Democratic	Xay Khamsyvoravong	32,763	26.2
Democratic	Sue AnderBois	21,544	17.3
Democratic	Cynthia Armour Coyne	16,324	13.1
Democratic	Ross McCurdy	7,248	5.8
Total votes		124,793	100.0

== Republican primary ==
=== Candidates ===
==== Nominee ====
- John Loughlin, former state representative from the 71st district (2005–2011) and nominee for Rhode Island's 1st congressional district in 2010

==== Declined ====
- Aaron Guckian, trade association executive and nominee in 2022 (running for governor)

=== Results ===
Republican primary results
Party	Candidate	Votes	%
Republican	John Loughlin	21,161	100.0
Total votes		21,161	100.0

== Independents ==
=== Candidates ===
==== Did not qualify ====
- Mabel Martinez

== General election ==
=== Post-primary endorsements ===
Sabina Matos (D)

Organizations

- EMILYs List

=== Polling ===
Poll source	Date(s) administered	Sample size	Margin of error	Sabina Matos (D)	John Loughlin (R)	Undecided
University of New Hampshire	October 27–31, 2026	753 (LV)	± 3.6%	56%	41%	4%
Emerson College/WPRI-TV	October 8–11, 2026	800 (LV)	± 3.5%	44%	45%	12%
Embold Research	October 5–8, 2026	815 (LV)	± 3.6%	43%	44%	11%
University of New Hampshire	September 17–21, 2026	598 (LV)	± 4.0%	48%	44%	7%

=== Results ===
2026 Rhode Island lieutenant gubernatorial election
Party	Candidate	Votes	%	±%
Democratic	Sabina Matos (incumbent)			
Republican	John J. Loughlin Jr.			
Write-in				
Total votes			100.0	

== See also ==
- 2026 United States lieutenant gubernatorial elections

== Notes ==
Partisan clients
