= Scott Pollard =

Scott Pollard may refer to:

- Scot Pollard (born 1975), retired American basketball player
- Scott M. Pollard (born 1970), American member of the Rhode Island House of Representatives
