= Nicholas Kettle =

American politician

Member of the Rhode Island Senate from the 21st district
- In office January 5, 2011 – February 22, 2018
- Preceded by: Leo Blais
- Succeeded by: Gordon Rogers

Personal details
- Born: October 18, 1990 (age 35)
- Party: Republican
- Education: Rhode Island College
- Website: nickkettleforrisenate.webs.com

Nicholas D. Kettle (born October 18, 1990) is an American politician and a former Republican member of the Rhode Island Senate. He represented District 21 in the Rhode Island Senate from January 2011 until his resignation in February 2018.

== Education ==
Kettle graduated from Coventry High School and is attending Rhode Island College.

== Elections ==
- 2012: Kettle was unopposed for the September 11, 2012 Republican Primary, winning with 752 votes, and won the November 6, 2012 General election with 6,977 votes (50.7%) against Democratic former state Representative Scott M. Pollard.
- 2010: Kettle challenged District 21 incumbent Senator Leo Blais in the September 23, 2010 Republican Primary, winning by 24 votes with 525 votes (51.2%), and won the three-way November 2, 2010 General election with 4,623 votes (36.4%) against Democratic nominee Anthony Colaluca and Independent candidate John Assalone.

== Arrest and resignation ==
On February 16, 2018, Kettle was arrested on charges of video voyeurism and extortion. A former girlfriend of Kettle filed the complaint. As a result of this arrest, Rhode Island state police seized Kettle's electronic devices.

Kettle was also charged with extorting a Senate page for sex on two occasions in 2011. Facing likely expulsion from the Rhode Island Senate, Kettle resigned on February 22, 2018. He complained about being denied due process in his resignation letter. In August 2019, Kettle was ultimately acquitted of extortion after the Attorney General's office dismissed the indictment after Kettle's legal team presented new evidence.
