= Senator Rumsey =

Senator Rumsey may refer to:

- Catherine Cool Rumsey (fl. 2010s), Rhode Island State Senate
- Henry Rumsey (1784–1855), Michigan State Senate
