= Senator Gibbs =

Senator Gibbs may refer to:

- Barnett Gibbs (1851–1904), Texas State Senate
- Bob Gibbs (born 1954), Ohio State Senate
- Dan Gibbs (born 1970s), Colorado State Senate
- Frederick S. Gibbs (1845–1903), New York State Senate
- June Gibbs (1922–2012), Rhode Island State Senate
- Leonard W. H. Gibbs (1875–1930), New York State Senate
- Washington Dorsey Gibbs (1839–1915), Mississippi State Senate
- William Gibbs (Australian politician) (1879–1944), Senate of Australia
