= Leo Blais =

American politician

Member of the Rhode Island Senate from the 21st district
- In office January 2, 2007 – January 5, 2011
- Preceded by: Marc Cote
- Succeeded by: Nicholas Kettle
- In office January 5, 1993 – January 7, 2003
- Preceded by: Raymond J. Monahan
- Succeeded by: Marc Cote

Member of the Rhode Island Senate from the 24th district
- In office January 7, 2003 – January 2, 2007
- Preceded by: Patrick T. McDonald
- Succeeded by: Marc Cote

Personal details
- Born: March 7, 1957 (age 69)
- Party: Republican
- Education: University of Rhode Island (BS)

Leo R. Blais (born March 7, 1957) is an American politician who served as a member of the Rhode Island Senate from 1993 to 2011. A Republican, Blais represented the towns of Coventry, Foster, and Scituate. Blais served in the 21st Senate district from his initial election in 1992 until he was redistricted to the 24th district in 2002. He was redistricted back to the 21st district in 2006.

== Political career ==
=== Elections ===
Blais first ran for Rhode Island Senate's 21st district in 1990, being defeated by Democratic incumbent Raymond J. Monahan by 89 votes in the general election. Blais ran again in 1992 and won with 4,836 votes (54.14%), defeating Monahan who only attained 3,570 votes (39.96%). Blais ran for re-election and won in 1994, defeating Democratic candidate Gwendolyn M. Westerman and Independent candidate Ernest J. Perras Jr., winning 5,306 votes (66.15%) to Westerman's 2,392 votes (29.82%) and Perras's 322 votes (4.01%).

In 1996 and 1998, Blais ran unopposed in the general election. It was not until 2000 that Blais saw competitors again, Democratic candidate Michael G. Reeves and Reform candidate Victor G. Moffitt challenged Blais, who defeated both candidates with 4,223 votes (43.68%) to Reeves's 3,652 votes (37.78%) and Moffitt's 1,791 votes (18.52%).

Blais was redistricted to the 24th Senate district in 2002 following the downsizing of the Rhode Island General Assembly in accordance with the 1984 Rhode Island Constitution. Blais defeated Salvatore Lombardi in the general election, with 6,646 votes (63.95%) to Lombardi's 3,746 votes (36.04%). Blais again defeated Lombardi in the 2004 Senate election.

Blais was redistricted back to the 21st Senate district in 2006, and defeated Lombardi in the general election for a third time in a row in the general election. In 2008, Blais defeated Lombardi for a fourth time, winning 7,657 votes (53.9%) to Lombardi's 6,554 votes (46.1%).

Blais's career in the Rhode Island Senate came to an end in 2010, as he was defeated by just 23 votes in the Republican Party's primary by Nicholas Kettle, who would go on to win the general election.

=== Political positions ===
As a pharmacist and the owner of his own pharmacy, Blais often advocated for small businesses and pharmaceuticals. Blais was a major factor in passing the legislation which created the Rhode Island Organ Donor Registry. Blais was also the first member of the General Assembly to propose legislation which would decriminalize possession of marijuana in the state.

== Personal life ==
Blais is married to Beverly A. Webster, and has two children. He attended the University of Rhode Island and graduated with a Bachelor of Science in pharmacy.

=== Revocation of pharmaceutical license ===
Blais had his pharmaceutical license suspended for 2 years by the Rhode Island Department of Health Board of Pharmacy in 2012 after he mistakenly dispensed prescriptions of Omeprazole tainted with Morphine to two children, however in 2013, Director of Health Michael Fine permanently revoked Blais's license.

Blais sued the Department of Health in 2014, and his license was reinstated in 2014 by Judge Stephen P. Nugent, who ruled that the Department of Health did not have the authority to revoke Blais's license. Blais further sued the state for damages, seeking $500,000 and an additional $63,000 in legal fees. He was awarded $43,000 in legal fees by Judge Daniel Procaccini in 2016. However, in May 2017, Judge Procaccini ruled that the Department of Health was within their right to revoke Blais's license, and did not award any damages.
