= Harold Metts =

American politician (born 1947)

President pro tempore of the Rhode Island Senate
- In office January 3, 2017 – January 5, 2021
- Preceded by: William Walaska
- Succeeded by: Hanna Gallo

Member of the Rhode Island Senate from the 6th district
- In office January 2005 – January 5, 2021
- Preceded by: Dominick J. Ruggerio
- Succeeded by: Tiara Mack

Member of the Rhode Island House of Representatives from the 19th district
- In office January 1985 – December 31, 1998
- Preceded by: ???
- Succeeded by: Aisha Abdullah-Odiase

Personal details
- Born: October 6, 1947 (age 78) Lexington, Virginia, U.S.
- Party: Democratic
- Education: Roger Williams University (BA); Bryant University; Rhode Island College (MEd)

Military service
- Allegiance: United States
- Branch/service: United States Army
- Years of service: 1970–1976
- Unit: Rhode Island National Guard

Harold M. Metts (born October 6, 1947) is an American politician who was a Democratic member of the Rhode Island Senate representing District 6 from January 2005 to January 2021. After Charles D. Walton, he is the second African American to serve in the Rhode Island Senate. Metts served non-consecutively in the Rhode Island General Assembly from January 1985 until December 31, 1998 in the Rhode Island House of Representatives.

== Education ==
Metts was born in Lexington, Virginia. He earned his BS degree from Roger Williams University, his teaching certificate from Bryant College (now Bryant University), and his MEd from Rhode Island College.

== Elections ==
- 1980s Metts was first elected in House District 19 in the November 6, 1984 General election and re-elected in the November 4, 1986 and November 8, 1988 general elections.
- 1990 Metts won the September 11, 1990 Democratic Primary and was unopposed for the November 6, 1990 General election, winning with 1,185 votes.
- 1992 Metts won the September 15, 1992 Democratic Primary and won the November 3, 1992 General election with 1,197 votes (85.5%) against Independent candidate Rebecca Douglas.
- 1994 Metts was unopposed for both the September 13, 1994 Democratic Primary and the November 8, 1994 General election, winning with 1,061 votes.
- 1996 Metts was unopposed for the September 10, 1996 Democratic Primary, winning with 281 votes, and won the November 5, 1996 General election with 1,156 votes (91.5%) against Republican nominee David Stahlbush.
- 2004 When District 6 Democratic Senator Dominick J. Ruggerio ran for re-election in District 4, Metts ran in the four-way September 14, 2004 Democratic Primary, winning with 1,341 votes (63.3%), and was unopposed for the November 2, 2004 General election with 5,019 votes.
- 2006 Metts was unopposed for both the September 12, 2006 Democratic Primary, winning with 1,714 votes, and the November 7, 2006 General election, winning with 4,804 votes.
- 2008 Metts was unopposed for the September 9, 2008 Democratic Primary, winning with 736 votes, and won the November 4, 2008 General election with 6,509 votes (90.6%) against Republican nominee Marc Coda.
- 2010 Metts was challenged in the September 23, 2010 Democratic Primary, winning with 1,958 votes (70.7%), and was unopposed for the November 2, 2010 General election, winning with 4,021 votes.
- 2012 Metts was unopposed for the September 11, 2012 Democratic Primary, winning with 1,545 votes, and won the November 6, 2012 General election, winning with 6,294 votes (91.8%) against Republican nominee Russell Hryzan.
- Metts was challenged by Tiara Mack in the September 8, 2020 Democratic primary, losing with 1,011 votes (40.2%) against 1,506 votes (59.8%).

Rhode Island Senate
Preceded by William Walaska	President pro tempore of the Rhode Island Senate; 2017–2021	Succeeded by Hanna Gallo
