= Lori Urso =

American politician

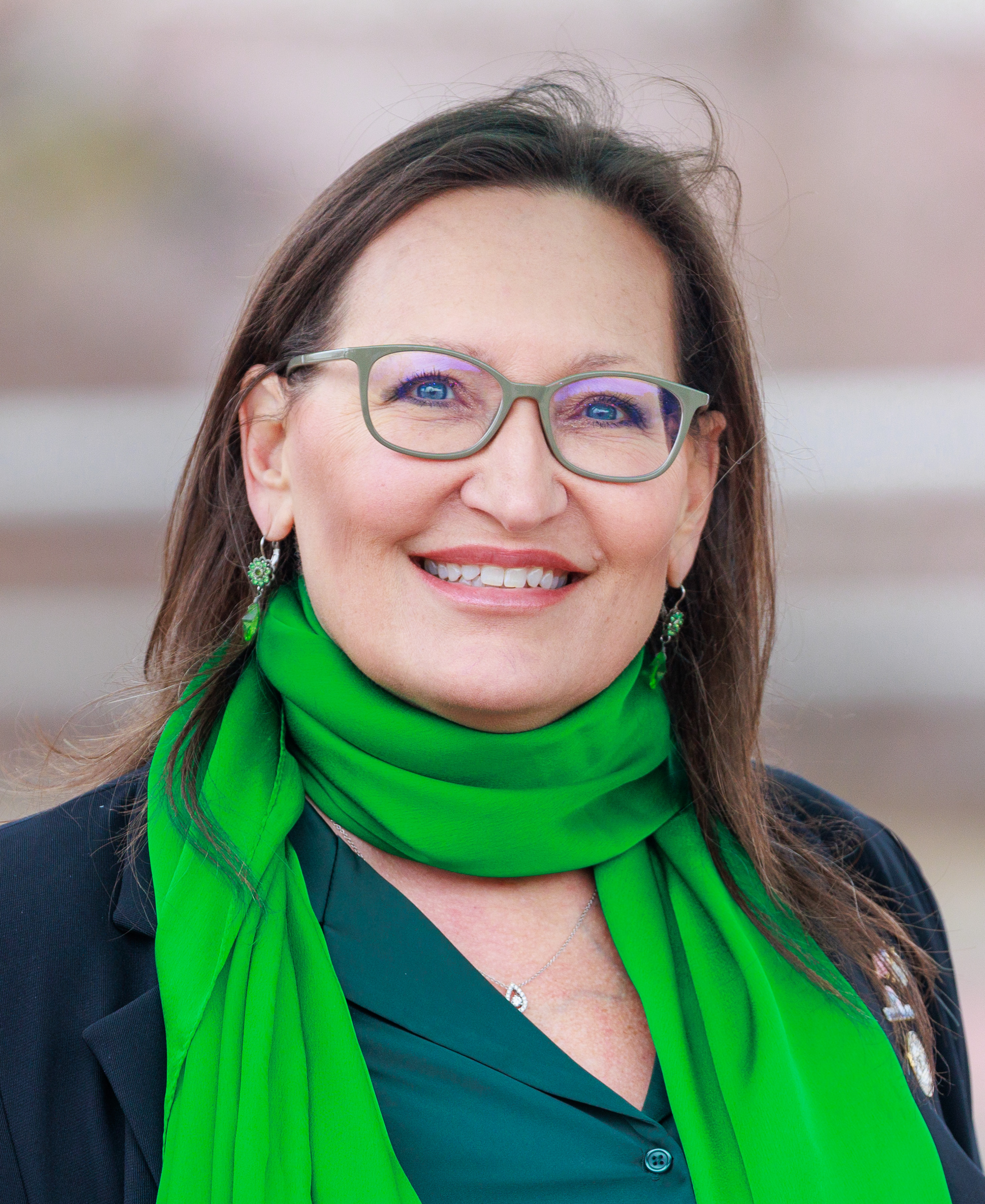

Member of the Rhode Island Senate from the 8th district
- Incumbent
- Assumed office January 2025
- Preceded by: Sandra Cano

Personal details
- Born: Providence, Rhode Island
- Party: Democratic
- Education: Rutgers University (BA); University of Rhode Island (MPA)

Lori Urso is an American politician serving in the Rhode Island Senate representing the 8th district since 2025.

== Early life and education ==
Urso holds a Bachelor of Arts from Rutgers University and a Master of Public Administration from the University of Rhode Island. A Providence native, Urso now lives in Pawtucket.

== Career ==
Urso previously served as a member of the Westerly Town Council from 2000 to 2002. She has served as CEO of the Old Slater Mill Association and Slater Industrial Archives since 2014, working on historical preservation. In 2024, she managed Pawtucket mayor Don Grebien’s primary re-election campaign. She also worked for a year as director of executive operations and deputy chief of staff to Rhode Island General Treasurer James Diossa.

== Rhode Island Senate ==
Urso was selected by the Rhode Island Democratic Party's state committee to replace Sandra Cano, who resigned after the primary election to join the Small Business Administration, on the November 2024 ballot. She defeated independent candidate Cathyann Palocsik.
