= Frank Lombardo =

American politician (1958–2024)

Member of the Rhode Island Senate from the 25th district
- In office January 4, 2011 – February 21, 2024
- Preceded by: Christopher Maselli
- Succeeded by: Andrew Dimitri

Personal details
- Born: July 12, 1958
- Died: February 21, 2024 (aged 65)
- Party: Democratic
- Education: Rhode Island College

Frank S. Lombardo III (July 12, 1958 – February 21, 2024) was an American politician and a Democratic member of the Rhode Island Senate representing District 25 from 2011 to 2024.

== Life and career ==
Lombardo was born on July 12, 1958. He attended Rhode Island College. Lombardo died from bladder cancer on February 21, 2024, at the age of 65.

== Elections ==
- 2012 Lombardo was challenged in the September 11, 2012 Democratic Primary, winning with 1,833 votes (63.4%), and was unopposed for the November 6, 2012 General election, winning with 9,551 votes.
- 2010 When District 25 Democratic Senator Christopher Maselli left the Legislature and left the seat open, Lombardo ran in the eight-way September 23, 2010 Democratic Primary, winning with 1,046 votes (18%) and won the six-way November 2, 2010 General election with 4,753 votes (43.8%) against Republican nominee Richard Fascia and Independent candidates Eric O'Connor, Alan Ross, Raffaele Florio, and Nikhol Bentley.
