= Andrew Dimitri =

American politician

Member of the Rhode Island Senate from the 25th district
- Incumbent
- Assumed office January 7, 2025
- Preceded by: Frank Lombardo

Personal details
- Party: Democratic
- Website: www.dimitriforsenate.com

Andrew R. Dimitri is an American politician who has served since January 2025 as a member of the Rhode Island Senate. He is an attorney by profession.
