= Catherine Cool Rumsey =

American politician

Member of the Rhode Island Senate from the 34th district
- In office January 2013 – January 2015
- Preceded by: Francis Maher
- Succeeded by: Elaine J. Morgan

Personal details
- Party: Democratic
- Education: Nazareth College (BS); Anna Maria College (MS)

Catherine Cool Rumsey is an American politician and was a Democratic member of the Rhode Island Senate representing District 34 from 2013 to 2014.

== Education ==
Cool Rumsey earned her BS in sociology from Nazareth College and her MS in quality management from Anna Maria College.

== Elections ==
- 2012 To challenge District 34 Republican Senator Francis Maher, Cool Rumsey was unopposed for the September 11, 2012 Democratic Primary, winning with 488 votes, and won the November 6, 2012 General election with 7,150 votes (55.1%) against Senator Maher.

Rumsey was defeated in her 2014 bid for re-election by Republican Elaine Morgan.
