= Elaine J. Morgan =

American politician

Member of the Rhode Island Senate from the 34th district
- Incumbent
- Assumed office January 2015
- Preceded by: Catherine Cool Rumsey

Personal details
- Party: Republican
- Spouse: Edward Morgan

Elaine J. Morgan is an American politician and a Republican member of the Rhode Island Senate representing District 34 since January 2015. She was the senate minority whip from June 2019 to January 2021. She was the first woman elected to be a Hopkinton town sergeant, serving for three terms before her election.

== Rhode Island Senate ==
Morgan was the first woman elected to be the town sergeant of Hopkinton, Rhode Island, and she served for three terms in the position before being elected to the Rhode Island Senate. In November 2014, she was elected as a Republican member of the Rhode Island Senate, representing District 34 (which includes Charlestown, Exeter, Hopkinton, Richmond, West Greenwich).

Amidst efforts by local Republicans to forbid Syrian refugees from entering the state following the 2015 Islamic terrorist attacks in Paris, Morgan sent an email to other state senators that called for the refugees to be placed in "a refugee camp to keep them segregated from our populous [sic]" and stated that the "Muslim religion and philosophy is to murder, rape, and decapitate anyone who is a non Muslim." She told television station WPRI that the latter statement was intended to be directed at only "the fanatical Muslim religion and philosophy", but she maintained the idea that Syrian refugees should be kept in camps.

Morgan proposed a bill during the 2017 legislative session requiring the mandatory instruction of cursive in public schools for first through sixth grade. She was the only person to vote nay against two successful gun-control bills in the 2018 session – a bump stock ban and a red flag bill giving police more power in removing guns from people shown to be dangerous – because she was unable to find protections for children in the red flag bill. The lead co-sponsor of the bill, Maryellen Goodwin, said in response that the bill was intended to protect "everyone ... Adults, children, you name it."

Morgan was the senate minority whip from June 2019 to January 2021. In 2019, legislators passed a bill that would protect the right to abortion in the state in the situation that Roe v. Wade is overturned by the Supreme Court; among other amendments to the bill proposed by Republicans, the Senate voted against an amendment by Morgan to make the bill effective only if Roe v. Wade was overturned. In 2022, she introduced a bill targeting transgender people in sports that would "categorize women by their biological identity at birth rather than their gender identity for purposes of organized sports." The bill was criticized by the recently formed Rhode Island Queer Political Action Committee. The Rhode Island Board of Elections issued a $1,200 fine to Morgan later that year for misreporting campaign contributions between the first quarters of 2020 and 2022.

== Personal life ==
She was married to the late Edward Morgan. They had two children.
