= June Gibbs =

American politician

Member of the Rhode Island Senate from the 12th district
- In office January 7, 2003 – January 3, 2009
- Preceded by: Hanna Gallo
- Succeeded by: Louis DiPalma

Member of the Rhode Island Senate from the 48th district
- In office January 1, 1985 – January 7, 2003
- Succeeded by: District abolished

Personal details
- Born: June 13, 1922 Newton, Massachusetts, U.S.
- Died: April 8, 2012 (aged 89) Middletown, Rhode Island, U.S.
- Party: Republican

June Nesbitt Gibbs (June 13, 1922 – April 8, 2012) was an American politician and Republican National Committee member who served in the Rhode Island Senate for 24 years, from 1985 to 2009. During World War II she was a lieutenant in the WAVES branch of the United States Naval Reserve.

== Early life and education ==
Nesbitt was born in Newton, Massachusetts, the daughter of Samuel Nesbitt and Lulu Glazier Nesbitt. She graduated from Wellesley College in 1943. She earned a master's degree in mathematics at Boston University in 1947.

== Career ==
During World War II Gibbs worked as a codebreaker for the United States Navy, and held the rank of lieutenant in the WAVES. In the 1950s she was president of the Newport branch of the American Association of University Women (AAUW), and president of the Newport County Council of Church Women.

Gibbs was the first woman elected to the Middletown Town Council, and held a seat on the council from 1974 to 1980, and again from 1982 to 1984. She was honored by the Middletown Republican Women with a reception in 1974. As a Middletown council member, she was active in establishing the Sachuest Point National Wildlife Refuge. "Things can be done better," she explained of her political interests in 1968. "And most of all I want to prove that it's alright for nice people to be in politics."

Gibbs was elected to the Rhode Island Senate in 1984. She was deputy minority leader beginning in 1985, and served in the Senate until 2009. In national politics, she was a Republican National Committee member for twelve years. She was a delegate to the 1968 Republican National Convention in Miami, and was responsible for coordinating housing for the 1976 Republican National Convention, when it was held in Kansas City, Missouri.

== Personal life ==
Nesbitt married librarian Donald Taylor Gibbs in 1945. They had a daughter, Elizabeth. Her husband died in 2001, and Gibbs died of cancer in 2012, at her home in Middletown, at age 89.
