= 2026 United States Senate election in Rhode Island =

- November 3, 2026
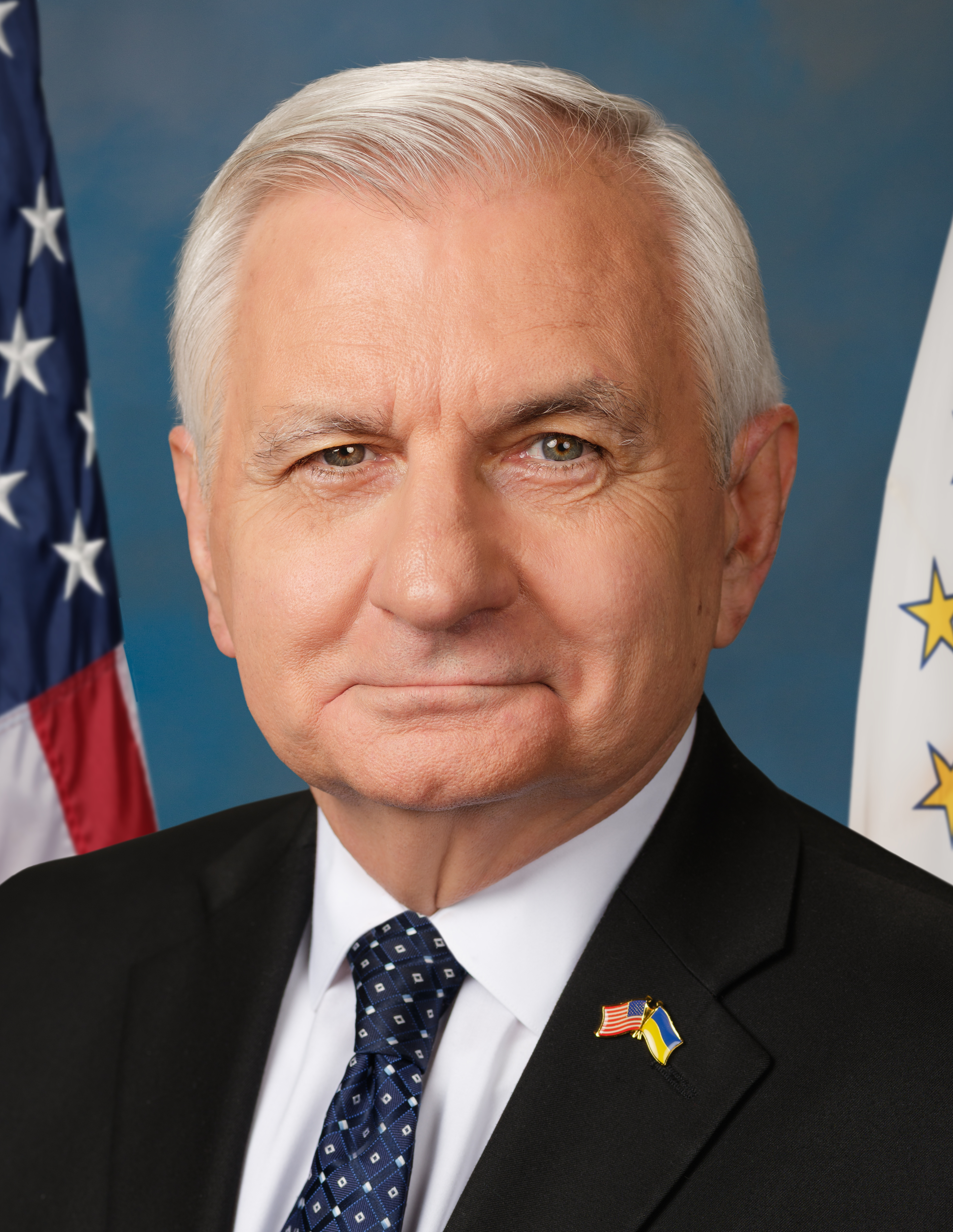

Nominee	Jack Reed	Raymond McKay
Party	Democratic	Republican
Popular vote	240,694	105,454
Percentage	66.78%	29.26%
- County results Reed: 50–60% 60–70% 70–80%
U.S. senator before election
Jack Reed
Democratic
Elected U.S. senator
Jack Reed
Democratic

The 2026 United States Senate election in Rhode Island was held on November 3, 2026, to elect a member of the United States Senate to represent the state of Rhode Island. Democratic incumbent Jack Reed was re-elected to a sixth term, defeating Republican former state party committee member Raymond McKay.

Primary elections were held on September 9. Reed won the Democratic nomination with 76.8% of the vote against minimal opposition. In the Republican primary, McKay ran unopposed.

== Democratic primary ==
=== Candidates ===
==== Nominee ====
- Jack Reed, incumbent U.S. senator (1997–present)

==== Eliminated in primary ====
- Connor Burbridge, elder care worker
- Luis Daniel Muñoz, physician, independent candidate for governor in 2018, and Democratic candidate for governor in 2022

==== Declined ====
- Gina Raimondo, former U.S. secretary of commerce (2021–2025) and governor of Rhode Island (2015–2021)

=== Endorsements ===
Jack Reed

Labor unions

- Association of Flight Attendants

Organizations

- AIPAC
- Giffords
- J Street
- Jewish Democratic Council of America
- Joint Action Committee for Political Affairs
- League of Conservation Voters
- Planned Parenthood Action Fund
- Population Connection
- Vote Vets

=== Fundraising ===
Campaign finance reports as of June 30, 2026
Candidate	Raised	Spent	Cash on hand
Jack Reed (D)	$4,213,768	$2,580,394	$3,642,761
Connor Burbridge (D)	$18,752	$14,887	$3,865
Source: Federal Election Commission

=== Polling ===
Poll source	Date(s) administered	Sample size (Note: Key: A – all adults RV – registered voters LV – likely voters V – unclear)	Margin of error	Connor Burbridge	Jack Reed	Other	Undecided
University of New Hampshire	August 20–24, 2026	451 (LV)	± 4.6%	18%	54%	2% (Note: Luis Daniel Muñoz with 2%)	26%
Embold Research (Note: Poll sponsored by the Pell Center for International Relations and Public Policy at Salve Regina University)	August 3–11, 2026	(LV)	—	12%	61%	6% (Note: Luis Daniel Muñoz with 4%; "Would not vote" with 2%)	20%
University of New Hampshire	June 18–23, 2026	337 (LV)	± 5.0%	25%	63%	–	12%
University of New Hampshire	April 16–20, 2026	323 (LV)	± 5.4%	15%	65%	–	20%

=== Results ===
Primary results by municipality: Reed: 60–70%; 70–80%; 80–90%

Democratic primary results
Party	Candidate	Votes	%
Democratic	Jack Reed (incumbent)	98,473	76.8
Democratic	Connor Burbridge	17,192	13.4
Democratic	Luis Daniel Muñoz	12,529	9.8
Total votes		128,194	100.0

== Republican primary ==
=== Candidates ===
==== Nominee ====
- Raymond McKay, former member of the Rhode Island Republican Party State Central Committee, former president of the Rhode Island Republican Assembly, and candidate for U.S. Senate in 2024

=== Fundraising ===
Campaign finance reports as of June 30, 2026
Candidate	Raised	Spent	Cash on hand
Raymond McKay (R)	$163,438	$161,032	$2,745
Source: Federal Election Commission

=== Results ===
Republican primary results
Party	Candidate	Votes	%
Republican	Raymond McKay	20,354	100.0
Total votes		20,354	100.0

== Independents ==
=== Candidates ===
==== Declared ====
- Michael Bahry, theologian

== General election ==
=== Predictions ===
Source	Ranking	As of
The Cook Political Report	Solid D	November 2, 2026
Decision Desk HQ	Safe D	November 3, 2026
The Economist (Note: The Economist's prediction model uses unconventional terminology. For the purpose of equivalency, their "Very Likely" ratings are formatted as a "Likely" rating while "Likely" ratings are formatted as a "Lean" rating.)	Safe D	November 3, 2026
FiftyPlusOne	Safe D	November 3, 2026
Fox News	Solid D	November 1, 2026
Inside Elections	Solid D	October 29, 2026
MS NOW	Safe D	October 29, 2026
NBC News	Solid D	November 3, 2026
RealClearPolitics	Solid D	November 2, 2026
Sabato's Crystal Ball	Safe D	November 2, 2026
Silver Bulletin	Solid D	November 3, 2026
Split Ticket	Safe D	November 2, 2026

=== Fundraising ===
Campaign finance reports as of October 14, 2026
Candidate	Raised	Spent	Cash on hand
Jack Reed (D)	$4,814,653	$4,940,508	$1,883,532
Raymond McKay (R)	$207,231	$199,212	$8,357
Source: Federal Election Commission

=== Polling ===
Aggregate polls

Source of poll aggregation	Dates administered	Dates updated	Jack Reed (D)	Raymond McKay (R)	Other/ Undecided (Note: Calculated by taking the difference of 100% and all other candidates combined.)	Margin
270toWin	October 5–31, 2026	November 2, 2026	59.0%	29.7%	11.3%	Reed +29.3%
RealClearPolitics	October 5–31, 2026	November 1, 2026	59.0%	29.7%	11.3%	Reed +29.3%
Silver Bulletin	through October 11, 2026	November 3, 2026	58.3%	29.4%	12.3%	Reed +28.9%
Average			58.8%	29.6%	11.6%	Reed +29.2%

Poll source	Date(s) administered	Sample size	Margin of error	Jack Reed (D)	Raymond McKay (R)	Michael Bahry (I)	Other	Undecided
University of New Hampshire	October 27–31, 2026	753 (LV)	± 3.6%	63%	32%	3%	0% (Note: "Another candidate" with <1%)	2%
Emerson College/WPRI-TV	October 8–11, 2026	800 (LV)	± 3.5%	59%	25%	7%	—	9%
Embold Research	October 5–8, 2026	815 (LV)	± 3.6%	55%	32%	4%	—	9%
University of New Hampshire	September 17–21, 2026	595 (LV)	± 4.0%	53%	33%	5%	1% (Note: "Another candidate" with 1%)	8%
University of New Hampshire	August 20–24, 2026	750 (LV)	± 3.6%	51%	31%	4%	2% (Note: "Write in someone else" with 2%)	13%
University of New Hampshire	June 18–23, 2026	664 (LV)	± 3.9%	52%	35%	—	1% (Note: "Another candidate" with 1%)	12%
University of New Hampshire	April 16–20, 2026	556 (LV)	± 4.0%	52%	34%	—	2% (Note: "Another candidate" with 2%)	12%

=== Results ===
2026 United States Senate election in Rhode Island
Party	Candidate	Votes	%	±%
Democratic	Jack Reed (incumbent)	240,686	66.79	
Republican	Raymond McKay	105,453	29.26	
Independent	Michael Bahry	13,562	3.76	
Write-in		695	0.19	
Total votes		360,396	100.0	

== Notes ==
Partisan clients
