= Rhode Island AFL–CIO =

- Headquarters: Providence, Rhode Island
- Location: United States
- Members: 250 locals, 80,000 workers
- Affiliations: AFL–CIO

The Rhode Island AFL–CIO is the statewide affiliate of the AFL–CIO in Rhode Island, United States. Its members include about 250 state and local affiliates of other unions affiliated with the AFL–CIO, representing about 80,000 workers.

The Rhode Island AFL–CIO engages in legislative activity, labor advocacy, and political lobbying and election work. It also coordinates the mobilization of workers on an as-needed basis for rallies, political work, contract campaigns and organizing. The Rhode Island AFL–CIO is particularly concerned with ensuring that the AFL–CIO's voice is heard when it comes to economic development in the state.

The federation is governed by a 93-member executive board. However, a 12-member executive committee of the executive board makes most of the decisions for the organization.

Frank Montanaro was president for 19 years, retiring in 2009. He was succeeded by George Nee.
