= Jonathon Acosta =

American politician

Member of the Rhode Island Senate from the 16th district
- Incumbent
- Assumed office January 5, 2021
- Preceded by: Elizabeth Crowley

Personal details
- Born: November 3, 1989 (age 36) New York City, New York, U.S.
- Party: Democratic
- Domestic partner: Aly Chatham
- Children: 2
- Education: Brown University (BA, MA, MA)

Jonathon Acosta (born November 3, 1989) is an American politician and academic serving as a member of the Rhode Island Senate from the 16th district. Elected in November 2020, he assumed office on January 5, 2021.

== Early life and education ==
Acosta was born in New York City in 1989. He earned a Bachelor of Arts degree in political science, Master of Arts in urban education policy, and Master of Arts in sociology from Brown University.

== Career ==
Acosta was a postdoctoral trainee at Brown University. From 2011 to 2013, he was an eighth grade math teacher in the Miami-Dade County Public Schools. From 2013 to 2017, he was a teacher and administrator at Blackstone Valley Prep Junior High School, a charter school in Central Falls, Rhode Island.
