= Stefano Famiglietti =

American politician

Member of the Rhode Island Senate from the 4th district
- Incumbent
- Assumed office August 14, 2025
- Preceded by: Dominick J. Ruggerio

Personal details
- Party: Democratic
- Education: University of Rhode Island; Roger Williams University School of Law

Stefano V. Famiglietti is an American lawyer and politician serving as a member of the Rhode Island Senate from the 4th district since 2025. A Democrat, he won a special election to fill the seat following incumbent Dominick J. Ruggerio's death. He previously served on the North Providence City Council from 2018 until 2025.

== Early life and education ==
Famiglietti is a lifelong resident of North Providence, Rhode Island, and graduated from North Providence High School. He went on to graduate summa cum laude from the University of Rhode Island and magna cum laude from the Roger Williams University School of Law.

== Career ==
Famiglietti is a lawyer and previously worked at Coia & Lepore LTD before opening his own personal injury law firm.

=== North Providence City Council ===
In 2018, Famiglietti announced his campaign for the North Providence City Council in District 2. He resigned his seat on August 14, 2025, to be sworn in to the Rhode Island Senate.

== Rhode Island Senate ==
Following incumbent Democrat and Senate President Dominick J. Ruggerio's death in April 2025, Famiglietti announced his campaign for the August special election to fill his term. Prior to the Democratic primary election, he was unanimously endorsed by the Senate District 4 Democratic Committee of the Rhode Island Democratic Party. He defeated former state representative Marcia Ranglin-Vassell, nurse Lenny Cioe, and account executive Manny Taveras in the primary election with 68% of the vote. Newsweek noted that Famiglietti outperformed Kamala Harris by 55 percentage points in the district, potentially signaling Democratic enthusiasm in the 2026 midterm elections. He was sworn in on August 14, 2025.

=== Positions ===
Famiglietti described himself as “pro-Second Amendment” and also personally opposes abortion as a Catholic but had no plans to oppose Rhode Island's reproductive health laws.
