= Marc Cote =

American politician

Marc A. Côté (born August 1, 1952) is an American former politician of French-Canadian descent. A Democrat, Côté represented Woonsocket, Rhode Island in the Rhode Island Senate from 1995 until 2019. Côté originally represented the Senate's 31st district, and the district was modified and renumbered to the 21st district in 2002, where he served until the district was modified in 2012 and renumbered again to the 24th district.

== Education ==
Côté graduated from Mt. St. Charles Academy, Woonsocket, Rhode Island in 1970, earned his BS degree from the University of Rhode Island and his MBA from Babson College.

== Elections ==
- 1992 To challenge District 31 incumbent Democratic Senator Peter Bouchard, Cote ran as an Independent in the November 3, 1992 General election, but lost to Senator Bouchard.
- 1994 When Senator Bouchard left the Legislature and left the seat open, Cote was unopposed for the September 13, 1994 Democratic Primary and won the November 8, 1994 General election with 2,357 votes (57.5%) against Republican nominee Roger Nault.
- 1996 Cote was unopposed for both the September 10, 1996 Democratic Primary, winning with 389 votes, and the November 5, 1996 General election, winning with 3,535 votes.
- 1998 Cote was unopposed for both the September 15, 1998 Democratic Primary, winning with 455 votes, and the November 3, 1998 General election, winning with 2,948 votes.
- 2000 Cote was unopposed for both the September 12, 2000 Democratic Primary, winning with 531 votes, and the November 7, 2000 General election, winning with 3,638 votes.
- 2002 District renumbered to District 21. Cote was challenged in the September 10, 2002 Democratic Primary, winning with 1,248 votes (54.7%), and was unopposed for the November 5, 2002 General election, winning with 4,829 votes.
- 2004 Cote was unopposed for the September 14, 2004 Democratic Primary, winning with 471 votes, and won the November 2, 2004 General election with 5,433 votes (49.3%) against Republican nominee Harvey Nabozny.
- 2006 Running in renumbered District 24, Cote was unopposed for both the September 12, 2006 Democratic Primary, winning with 1,400 votes, and the November 7, 2006 General election, winning with 5,482 votes.
- 2008 Cote was unopposed for both the September 9, 2008 Democratic Primary, winning with 637 votes, and the November 4, 2008 General election, winning with 6,192 votes.
- 2010 Cote was unopposed for both the September 23, 2010 Democratic Primary, winning with 1,486 votes, and the November 2, 2010 General election, winning with 4,233 votes.
- 2012 Cote was challenged in the September 11, 2012 Democratic Primary, winning with 1,433 votes (62.0%), and was unopposed for the November 6, 2012 General election, winning with 6,650 votes.
