= Victoria Gu =

American politician

Member of the Rhode Island Senate from the 38th district
- Incumbent
- Assumed office January 3, 2023
- Preceded by: Dennis Algiere

Personal details
- Born: November, 1993 Illinois, U.S.
- Party: Democratic
- Education: Harvard University (BA)

Victoria Gu is an American politician serving as a member of the Rhode Island Senate for the 38th district. Elected in November 2022, she assumed office on January 3, 2023.

== Early life and education ==
The daughter of immigrants from China, Gu was born in Illinois and raised in South Kingstown, Rhode Island. She earned a Bachelor of Arts degree in computer science from Harvard University.

== Career ==
Outside of politics, Gu worked as a software engineer at LunaYou, a wellness startup. She also served as a member of the Charlestown Resiliency Commission. She was elected to the Rhode Island Senate in November 2022 and assumed office on January 3, 2023.
