= 2026 United States House of Representatives elections in Rhode Island =

- November 3, 2026

Both Rhode Island seats to the United States House of Representatives
	Majority party	Minority party
Party	Democratic	Republican
Last election	2	0
Seats won	2	0
Seat change	Steady	Steady
Popular vote	233,127	118,806
Percentage	64.96%	33.10%
Swing	▲4.54%	▼4.07%

Democratic
40–50%
50–60%
60–70%
70–80%
Republican
50–60%

Elections were held on November 3, 2026, to elect the two U.S. representatives from the state of Rhode Island, one from both of the state's congressional districts. Primary elections took place on September 9, 2026.

== District 1 ==
2026 Rhode Island's 1st congressional district election
- November 3, 2026
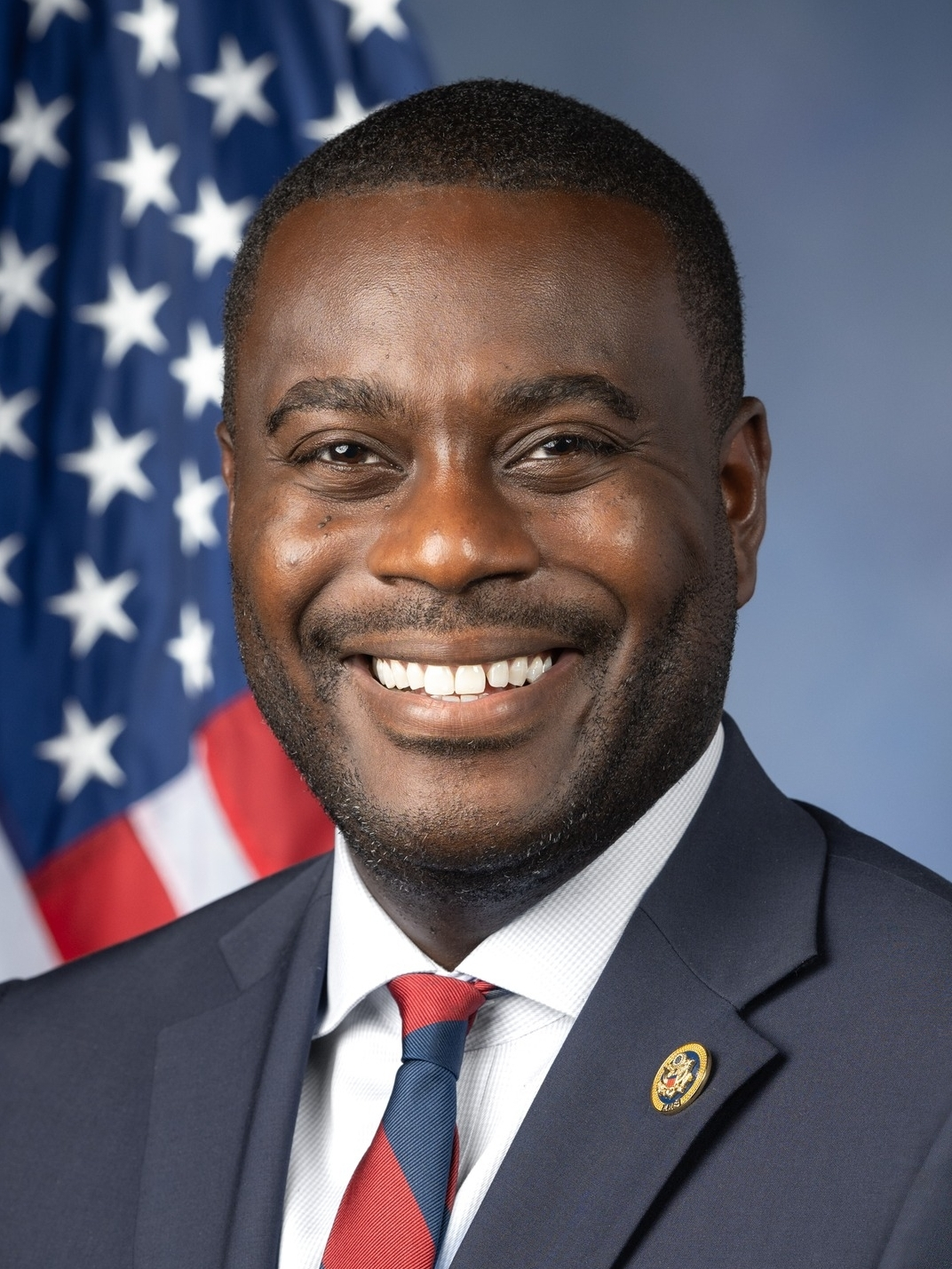

Nominee	Gabe Amo	Kellie Keenan
Party	Democratic	Republican
Popular vote	112,107	44,901
Percentage	68.6%	27.5%
- Municipality results Amo: 50–60% 60–70% 70–80% 80–90%
U.S. representative before election
Gabe Amo
Democratic
Elected U.S. representative
Gabe Amo
Democratic

The 1st district encompasses the eastern portion of the state, including Pawtucket, Woonsocket, Newport, and much of Providence. The incumbent is Democrat Gabe Amo, who was re-elected with 63.0% of the vote in 2024.

=== Democratic primary ===
==== Nominee ====
- Gabe Amo, incumbent U.S. representative (2023–present)

==== Endorsements ====
Gabe Amo

Political parties

- Rhode Island Democratic Party

Labor unions

- National Education Association Rhode Island

Organizations

- AIPAC
- J Street
- Jewish Democratic Council of America
- Joint Action Committee for Political Affairs
- Planned Parenthood Action Fund
- Population Connection

==== Fundraising ====
Campaign finance reports as of March 31, 2026
Candidate	Raised	Spent	Cash on hand
Gabe Amo (D)	$1,158,839	$540,891	$1,552,594
Source: Federal Election Commission

==== Results ====
Democratic primary results
Party	Candidate	Votes	%
Democratic	Gabe Amo (incumbent)	56,255	100.0
Total votes		56,255	100.0

=== Republican primary ===
==== Nominee ====
- Kellie Keenan, entrepreneur

==== Results ====
Republican primary results
Party	Candidate	Votes	%
Republican	Kellie Keenan	7,155	100.0
Total votes		7,155	100.0

=== Independents ===
==== Declared ====
- Pedro DeSouza, small business owner

=== General election ===
==== Predictions ====
Source	Ranking	As of
The Cook Political Report	Solid D	February 6, 2025
Decision Desk HQ	Safe D	July 14, 2026
Inside Elections	Solid D	March 7, 2025
Sabato's Crystal Ball	Safe D	August 14, 2025
Silver Bulletin	Solid D	August 23, 2026

==== Polling ====
Poll source	Date(s) administered	Sample size (Note: Key: A – all adults RV – registered voters LV – likely voters V – unclear)	Margin of error	Gabe Amo (D)	Kellie Keenan (R)	Pedro DeSouza (I)	Undecided
Emerson College/WPRI-TV	October 8–11, 2026	394 (LV)	± 4.9%	54%	26%	6%	14%
Embold Research (Note: Poll sponsored by Pell Center for International Relations and Public Policy.)	October 5–8, 2026	363 (LV)	—	52%	33%	4%	10%

== District 2 ==
2026 Rhode Island's 2nd congressional district election
- November 3, 2026
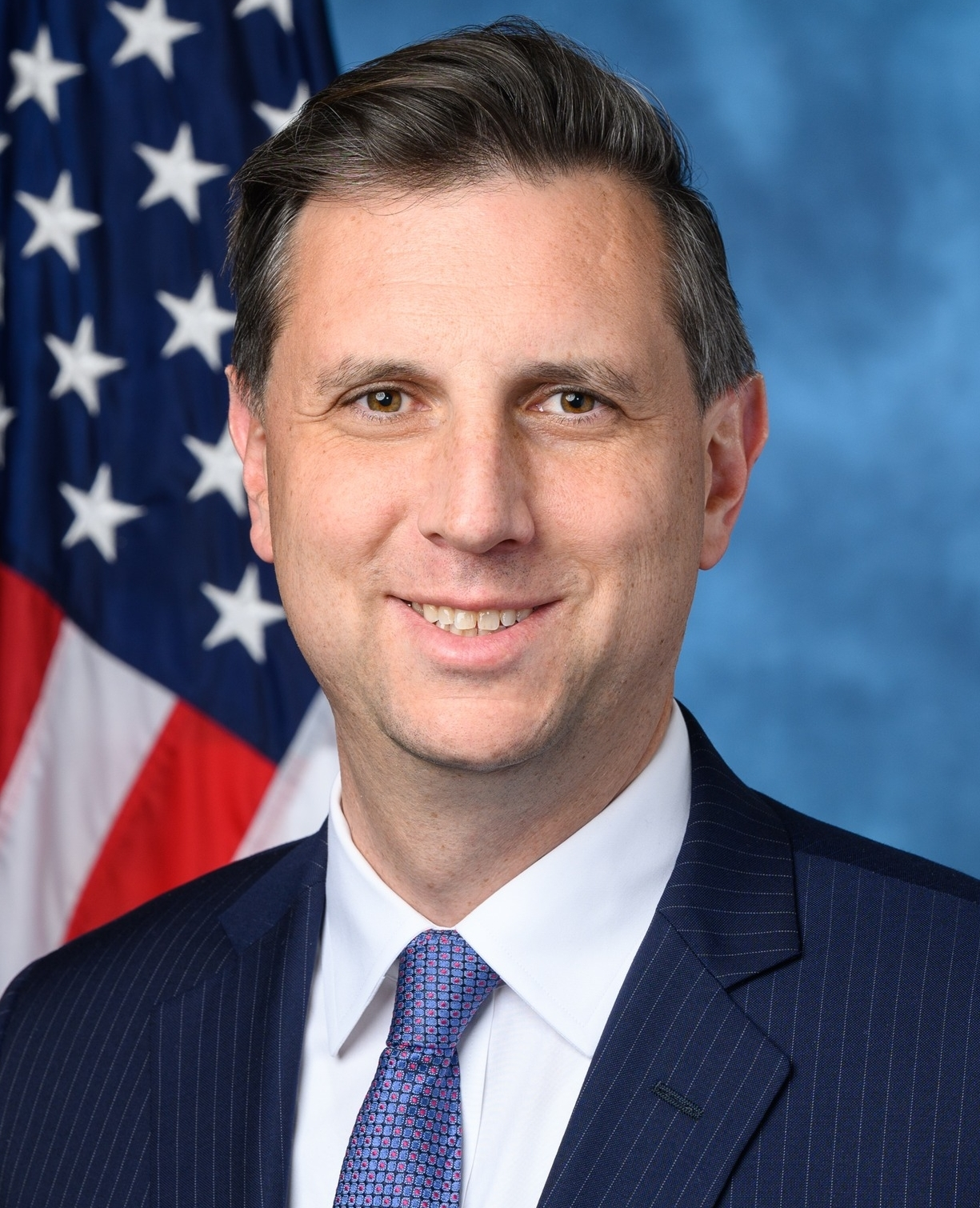

Nominee	Seth Magaziner	Victor Mellor
Party	Democratic	Republican
Popular vote	121,020	73,905
Percentage	61.9%	37.8%
- Municipality results Magaziner: 50–60% 60–70% 70–80% 80–90% Mellor: 50–60%
U.S. representative before election
Seth Magaziner
Democratic
Elected U.S. representative
Seth Magaziner
Democratic

The 2nd district encompasses the western portion of the state, including Cranston, Warwick, and portions of Providence. The incumbent is Democrat Seth Magaziner, who was re-elected with 58.2% of the vote in 2024.

=== Democratic primary ===
==== Nominee ====
- Seth Magaziner, incumbent U.S. representative (2023–present)

==== Endorsements ====
Seth Magaziner

Political parties

- Rhode Island Democratic Party

Labor unions

- National Education Association Rhode Island

Organizations

- AIPAC
- J Street
- Jewish Democratic Council of America
- Joint Action Committee for Political Affairs
- Planned Parenthood Action Fund

==== Fundraising ====
Campaign finance reports as of March 31, 2026
Candidate	Raised	Spent	Cash on hand
Seth Magaziner (D)	$1,035,480	$419,690	$1,492,754
Source: Federal Election Commission

==== Results ====
Democratic primary results
Party	Candidate	Votes	%
Democratic	Seth Magaziner (incumbent)	55,135	100.0
Total votes		55,135	100.0

=== Republican primary ===
==== Nominee ====
- Victor Mellor, businessman and registered foreign agent for Cuba

==== Eliminated in primary ====
- Stephen Skoly, physician

==== Endorsements ====
Victor Mellor

Executive branch officials

- Michael Flynn, former national security advisor (2017)
Stephen Skoly

State legislators

- Gordon Rogers, Senate minority whip (2022–present) from SD–21 (2019–present)

Political parties

- Rhode Island Republican Party

Labor unions

- Rhode Island State Fraternal Order of Police

==== Fundraising ====
Campaign finance reports as of March 31, 2026
Candidate	Raised	Spent	Cash on hand
Victor Mellor (R)	$606,486	$374,065	$232,420
Stephen Skoly (R)	$107,585	$5,236	$102,348
Source: Federal Election Commission

==== Polling ====
Poll source	Date(s) administered	Sample size	Margin of error	Victor Mellor	Stephen Skoly	Other	Undecided
Embold Research (Note: Poll sponsored by Pell Center for International Relations and Public Policy)	August 3–11, 2026	— (LV)	—	22%	29%	1% (Note: "Write-in" with 1%)	48%

==== Results ====
Primary results by municipality: Mellor: 50–60%; 60–70%; 70–80%; Skoly: 50–60%

Republican primary results
Party	Candidate	Votes	%
Republican	Victor Mellor	8,837	58.1
Republican	Stephen Skoly	6,380	41.9
Total votes		15,217	100.0

=== General election ===
==== Predictions ====
Source	Ranking	As of
The Cook Political Report	Solid D	February 6, 2025
Decision Desk HQ	Safe D	September 8, 2026
Inside Elections	Solid D	March 7, 2025
Sabato's Crystal Ball	Safe D	August 14, 2025
Silver Bulletin	Solid D	August 23, 2026

==== Polling ====
Poll source	Date(s) administered	Sample size	Margin of error	Seth Magaziner (D)	Vic Mellor (R)	Undecided
Emerson College/WPRI-TV	October 8–11, 2026	406 (LV)	± 4.9%	55%	39%	6%
Embold Research	October 5–8, 2026	417 (LV)	—	52%	39%	7%

== Notes ==
Partisan and media clients
