= Louis DiPalma =

American politician

Lou DiPalma
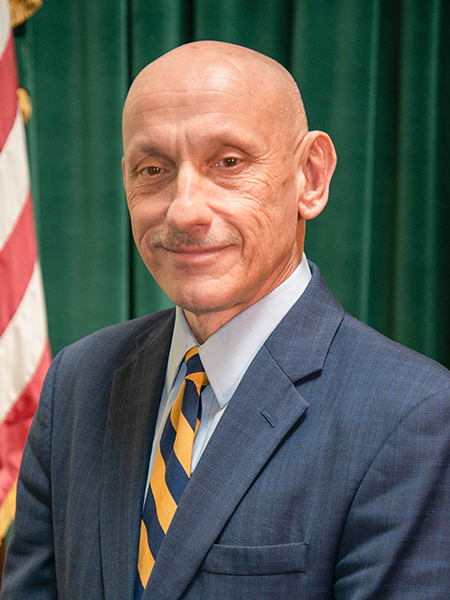

Member of the Rhode Island Senate from the 12th district
- Incumbent
- Assumed office January 2009
- Preceded by: June Gibbs

Personal details
- Born: April 20, 1961 (age 65) Bridgeport, Connecticut, U.S.
- Party: Democratic
- Education: University of Bridgeport (BS); Brown University (MS)
- Website: Official website

Louis P. DiPalma (born April 20, 1961 in Bridgeport, Connecticut) is an American politician and a Democratic member of the Rhode Island Senate representing District 12 since January 2009. He also served on the Middletown, Rhode Island Town council from 2004 to 2008, stepping down in 2008 to run for Rhode Island State Senate.

== Education ==
DiPalma earned his BS in computer engineering from the University of Bridgeport and his MS in computer science from Brown University.

== Elections ==
- 2012 DiPalma was unopposed for both the September 11, 2012 Democratic Primary, winning with 982 votes, and the November 6, 2012 General election, winning with 9,203 votes.
- 2008 To challenge District 12 incumbent Republican Senator June Gibbs, DiPalma was unopposed for the September 9, 2008 Democratic Primary, winning with 365 votes, and won the November 4, 2008 General election with 6,558 votes (52.4%) against Senator Gibbs.
- 2010 DiPalma was unopposed for both the September 23, 2010 Democratic Primary, winning with 987 votes, and the November 2, 2010 General election, winning with 6,603 votes.
