= Hanna Gallo =

American politician (born 1956)

President pro tempore of the Rhode Island Senate
- Incumbent
- Assumed office January 5, 2021
- Preceded by: Harold Metts

Member of the Rhode Island Senate from the 27th district
- Incumbent
- Assumed office January 2003
- Preceded by: Paul Fogarty

Member of the Rhode Island Senate from the 12th district
- In office January 1999 – January 2003
- Preceded by: John O'Leary
- Succeeded by: June Gibbs

Personal details
- Born: November 21, 1956 (age 69) Colorado Springs, Colorado, U.S.
- Party: Democratic
- Education: Community College of Rhode Island (attended); University of Rhode Island (BS, MS)

Hanna M. Gallo (born November 21, 1956, in Colorado Springs, Colorado) is an American politician and a Democratic member of the Rhode Island Senate representing District 27 since January 2003. Gallo served consecutively from January 1999 until January 2003 in the District 12 seat.

== Education ==
Gallo attended the Community College of Rhode Island, and earned her BS and MS from the University of Rhode Island.

== Elections ==
- 1998 When District 12 Democratic Senator John O'Leary left the Legislature and left the seat open, Gallo ran in the September 15, 1998 Democratic Primary, winning with 1,497 votes (66.9%), and the November 3, 1998 General election with 4,357 votes (64.2%) against Republican nominee Kenneth Hopkins.
- 2000 Gallo was unopposed for the September 12, 2000 Democratic Primary, winning with 1,453 votes, and won the November 7, 2000 General election with 5,109 votes (70.0%) against returning 1998 Democratic Primary opponent Edward Marrapese, running as an independent.
- 2002 Redistricted to District 27, and with incumbent Democratic Senator Paul Fogarty redistricted to District 23, Gallo was unopposed for the September 10, 2002 Democratic Primary, winning with 1,821 votes, and won the November 5, 2002 General election with 6,876 votes (66.8%) against Republican nominee Christopher Kite.
- 2004 Gallo was unopposed for the September 14, 2004 Democratic Primary, winning with 1,056 votes, and won the November 2, 2004 General election with 8,572 votes (62.2%) against Republican nominee Robin Porter.
- 2006 Gallo was unopposed for the September 12, 2006 Democratic Primary, winning with 435 votes, and won the November 7, 2006 General election with 7,802 votes (65.6%) against Republican nominee Robert Lancia.
- 2008 Gallo was unopposed for both the September 9, 2008 Democratic Primary, winning with 868 votes, and the November 4, 2008 General election, winning with 9,254 votes.
- 2010 Gallo was unopposed for the September 23, 2010 Democratic Primary, winning with 1,422 votes, and won the November 2, 2010 General election with 6,164 votes (61.0%) against Republican nominee Eileen Grossman.
- 2012 Gallo was unopposed for the September 11, 2012 Democratic Primary, winning with 1,051 votes, and won the three-way November 6, 2012 General election with 5,872 votes (46.6%) against Independent candidate Aram Garabedian and returning 2006 Republican opponent Robert Lancia.

Rhode Island Senate
Preceded by Harold Metts	President pro tempore of the Rhode Island Senate; 2021–present	Incumbent
