= Lammis Vargas =

American politician

Member of the Rhode Island Senate from the 28th district
- Incumbent
- Assumed office January 7, 2025
- Preceded by: Joshua Miller

Personal details
- Party: Democratic
- Website: lammisvargas.com

Lammis J. Vargas is an American politician who has served since January 2025 as a member of the Rhode Island Senate. She was Cranston City Council Vice President.
