= Gordon Rogers =

American politician

Member of the Rhode Island Senate from the 21st district
- Incumbent
- Assumed office January 1, 2019
- Preceded by: Nicholas Kettle

Personal details
- Born: December 22, 1964 (age 61)
- Party: Republican
- Spouse: Heidi
- Children: 4

Gordon E. Rogers (born December 22, 1964) is an American politician. He is a Republican representing the 21st district in the Rhode Island State Senate.

== Early life ==
Rogers grew up in Foster, Rhode Island.

== Political career ==
Rogers was elected to three terms on the Foster Town Council, in 2010, 2014, and 2016.

Rogers announced his candidacy for the District 21 seat in the Rhode Island State Senate in February 2018, following the resignation of the 21st district's former senator, Nicholas Kettle. His lone opponent in the Republican primary, Julie Lamin, was disqualified from the race. In the general election, Rogers faced Michael Fine, an independent candidate, and James Safford, a Democrat; Rogers won the three-way race with 42.5% of the vote.

Rogers sits on the following Senate committees:

- Environment & Agriculture
- Housing & Municipal Government
- Rules, Government Ethics & Oversight

== Personal life ==
He and his wife, Heidi, have four children and live in Foster.

== Electoral record ==
2022 general election: Rhode Island State Senate, District 21
Party	Candidate	Votes	%
Republican	Gordon Rogers	8,319	64.4%
Democratic	Giang Bui	4,577	35.4%

2018 general election: Rhode Island State Senate, District 21
Party	Candidate	Votes	%
Republican	Gordon Rogers	5,271	42.5%
Independent	Michael Fine	3,758	30.3%
Democratic	James Safford	3,377	27.2%
