= Scott M. Pollard =

American politician (born 1970)

Member of the Rhode Island House of Representatives from the 40th district
- In office 2 January 2009 – 4 January 2011
- Preceded by: Nicholas Gorham (R-40)
- Succeeded by: Michael Chippendale (R-40)

Personal details
- Born: January 12, 1970 (age 56)
- Party: Democratic
- Spouse: Elisa M. Pollard
- Children: Logan, Luca, Siena
- Education: Roger Williams University, Pace University, Pace University School of Law
- Profession: self-employed Attorney

Scott M. Pollard (born 1970) is an American attorney and one-term Democratic member of the Rhode Island House of Representatives, representing the 40th District since 2 January 2009. During the 2009-2010 sessions, he served on the House Committees on Judiciary and Separation of Powers. Pollard was defeated for reelection in the 2 November 2010 general elections to Michael W. Chippendale
