= Tiara Mack =

American politician (born 1993)

Member of the Rhode Island Senate from the 6th district
- Incumbent
- Assumed office January 5, 2021
- Preceded by: Harold Metts

Personal details
- Born: December 21, 1993 (age 32) Atlanta, Georgia
- Party: Democratic
- Education: Brown University (BA)

Tiara Mack (born December 21, 1993) is an American politician. She is a Democratic member of the Rhode Island Senate, representing District 6. Mack assumed office on January 5, 2021, having defeated the incumbent senator Harold Metts in the Democratic primary.

== Early life ==
Born in 1993, Tiara Mack was raised in Georgia and South Carolina. Mack's mother worked as a teacher. Her family struggled financially.

In 2012, Mack moved to Providence, Rhode Island, to attend Brown University; she graduated from the school in 2016 with a Bachelor of Arts in public health.

While attending Brown University, Mack played in the university's women's Rugby Union team. Mack was trained by Rugby World Cup winner, Kathy Flores. In May 2022, Mack was named championship MVP at the USA Rugby National Championship.

== Career ==
In the 2020 Rhode Island Senate elections, Mack challenged incumbent state Senator Harold Metts in the Democratic primary. Mack's campaign proved effective at winning over younger, more socially liberal voters. Mack defeated Metts, winning with 60% of the vote.

As of 2022 Mack is the first openly queer black person elected to the Rhode Island Senate.

Mack joined TikTok to create a larger conversation around bodily autonomy. In July 2022, a video from Mack's TikTok account went viral. In the video, Mack is shown in a bikini at the beach doing a headstand and twerking. Mack’s TikTok account was banned a few days after the video and was restored shortly after The New York Times reached out to TikTok for comment on the ban. Mack used the spotlight to start Twitter campaign, #TwerkFor, to represent progressive political movements. She stated, “I #TwerkFor joy, abortion justice, body autonomy, trans rights and intersex rights.”
