= Rhode Island Democratic Party =

Rhode Island affiliate of the Democratic Party

- Chairperson: Elizabeth Perik
- Governor: Dan McKee
- Lieutenant Governor: Sabina Matos
- Senate President: Dominick Ruggerio
- House Speaker: Joe Shekarchi
- Headquarters: Warwick, RI
- Membership (2021): ▼346,320
- National affiliation: Democratic Party
- Colors: Blue
- Seats in the U.S. Senate: 2 / 2
- Seats in the U.S. House: 2 / 2
- Statewide executive offices: 5 / 5
- State Senate: 33 / 38
- State House: 65 / 75

Website
- www.ridemocrats.org

The Rhode Island Democratic Party is the affiliate of the Democratic Party in the U.S. state of Rhode Island. Elizabeth Perik is the chair of the party. The party has dominated politics in Rhode Island for the past five decades.

== Democratic Party dominance in Rhode Island ==
For nearly five decades, Rhode Island has been one of the United States' most solidly Democratic states. Since 1928, it has voted for the Republican presidential candidate only four times (Dwight Eisenhower in 1952 and 1956, Richard Nixon in 1972 and Ronald Reagan in 1984) and has elected only two Republicans (former Governor John H. Chafee and his son, Lincoln Chafee, though the younger Chafee became a Democrat during his later governorship) to the U.S. Senate since 1934. Rhode Island sent no Republicans to the U.S. House of Representatives from 1940 until 1980, when one Republican and one Democrat were elected. In 1980, Rhode Island was one of only six states to be won by incumbent president Jimmy Carter. However, Republican Edward DiPrete was elected governor in 1984 and Ronald Reagan narrowly carried the state in the 1984 presidential election. In the 2000 presidential election, Democrat Al Gore won 61% of the popular vote in the state.

An analysis of Gallup polling data shows the Democratic advantage over the Republican Party in Rhode Island voters plunged between 2008 and 2011. The Democratic advantage over the Republican Party in Rhode Island slid from 37 percentage points in 2008 to 16, according to Gallup. Rhode Island went from the most Democratic state in the country in 2008 to the seventh most Democratic in 2011.

== Elected officials ==
=== U.S. Senate ===
Democrats have controlled both of Rhode Island's seats in the U.S. Senate since 2006:

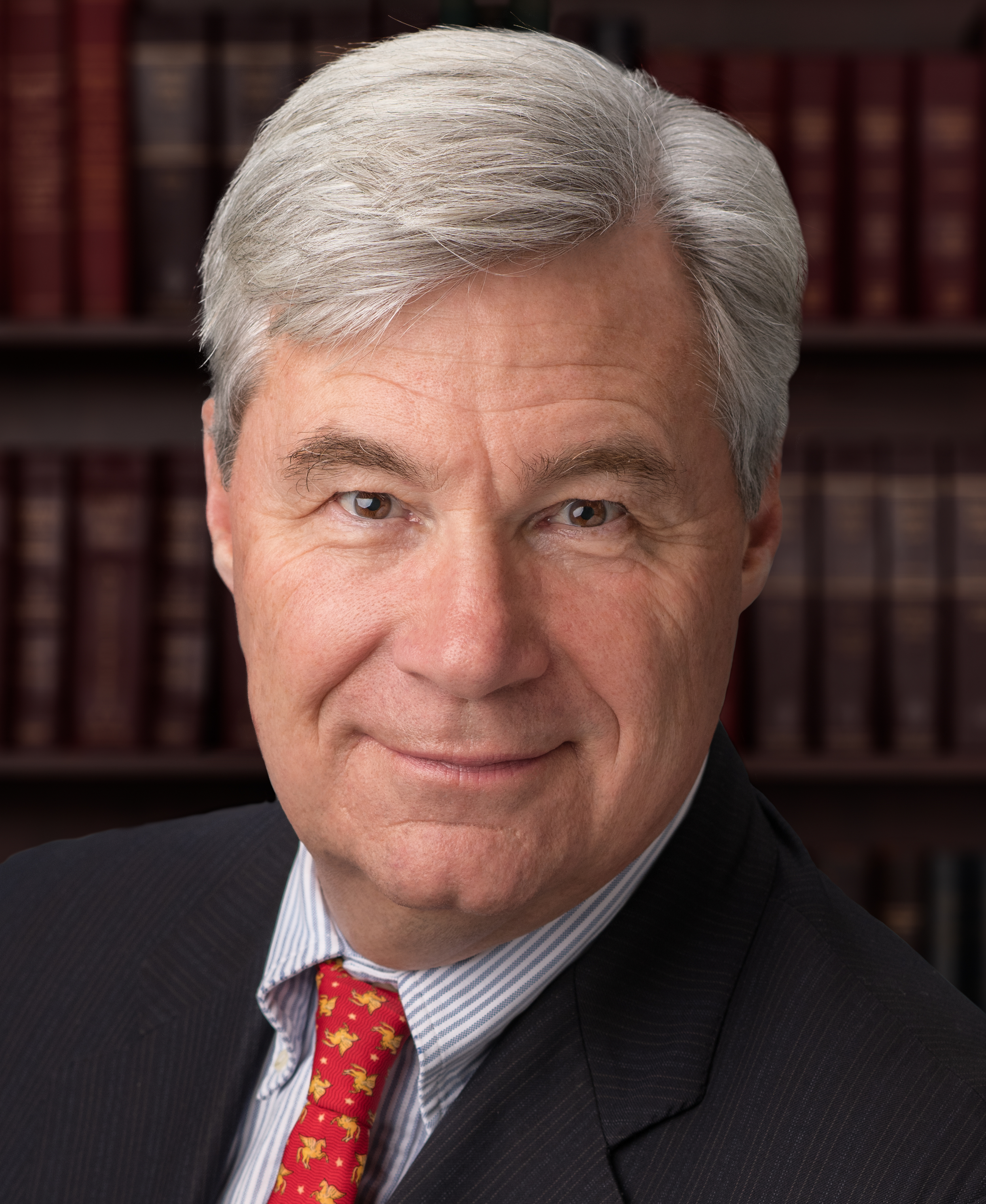
Junior U.S. Senator Sheldon Whitehouse

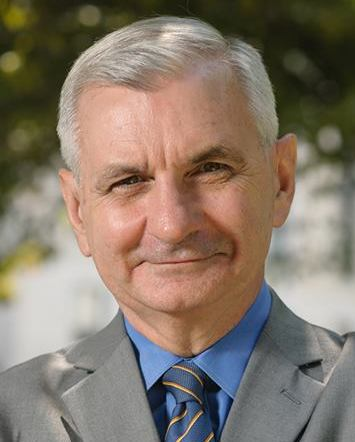
Senior U.S. Senator Jack Reed

=== U.S. House of Representatives ===
Out of the two seats Rhode Island is apportioned in the U.S. House of Representatives, both are held by Democrats.

District	Member	Photo
1st	Gabe Amo	
2nd	Seth Magaziner	

=== Statewide officials ===
Democrats control all five of the elected statewide offices:

- Governor: Dan McKee → Helena Foulkes (elect)
- Lieutenant Governor: Sabina Matos
- Secretary of State: Gregg Amore
- Attorney General: Peter Neronha → Kim Ahern (elect)
- General Treasurer: James Diossa
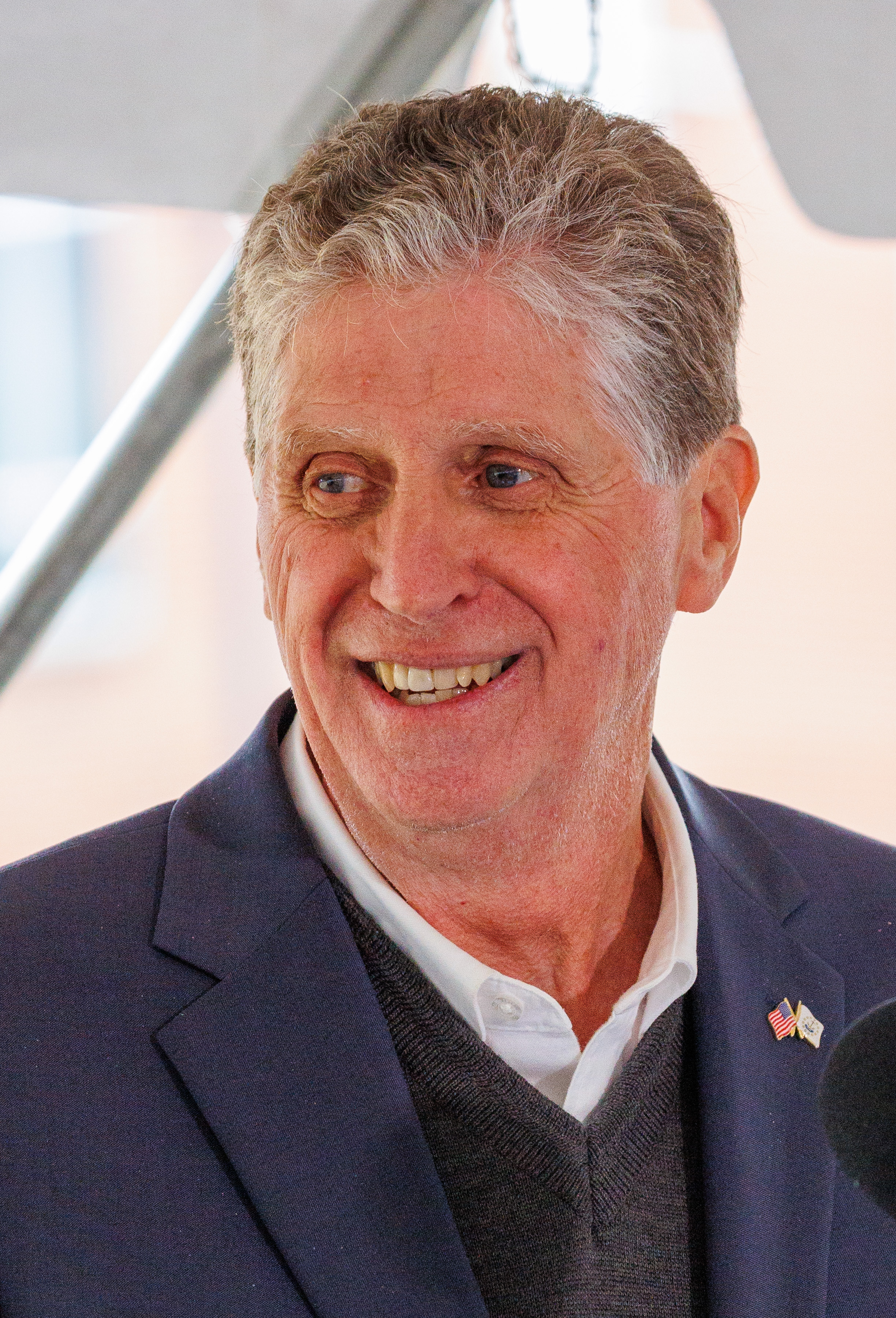
Dan McKee

Helena Foulkes

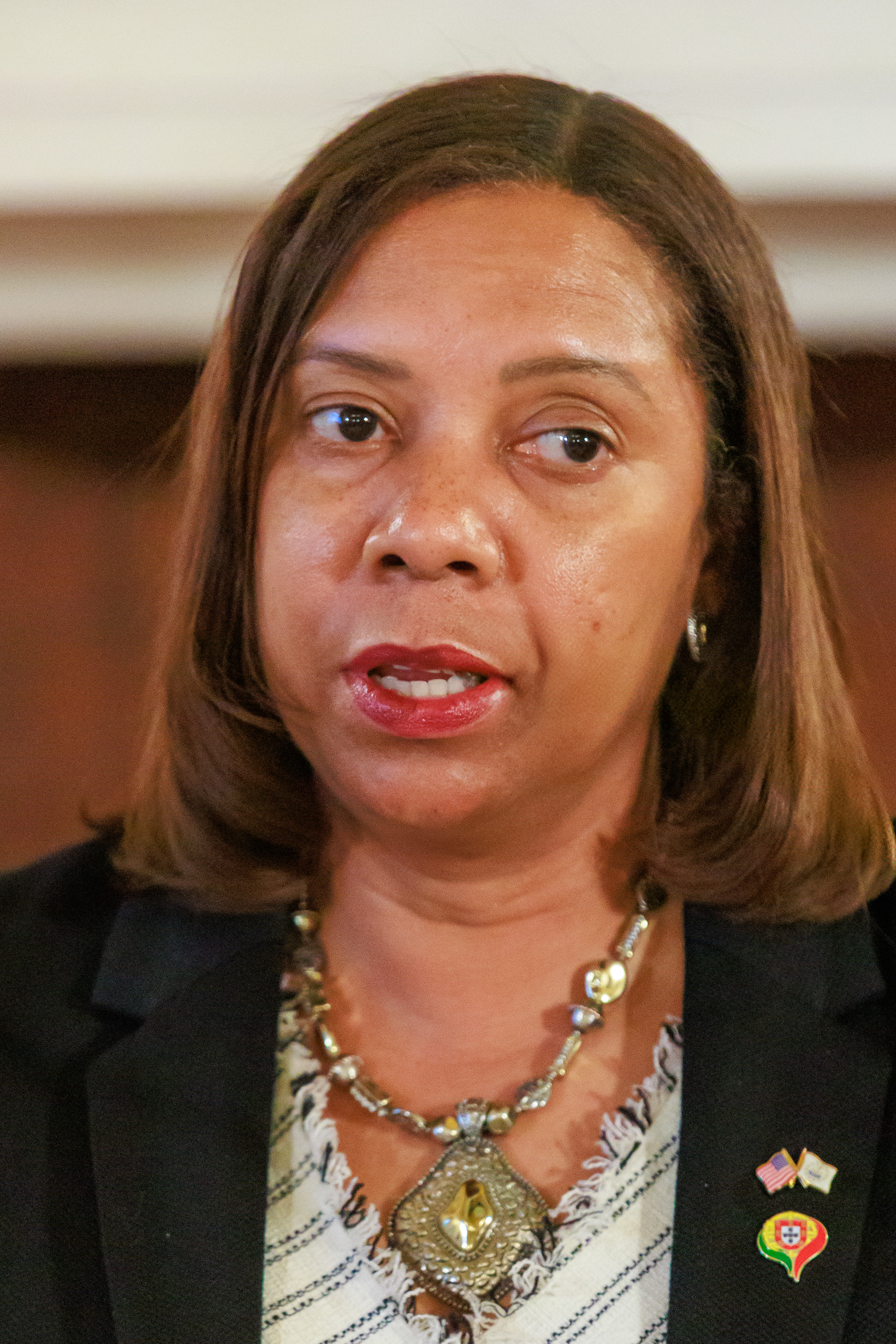
Sabina Matos

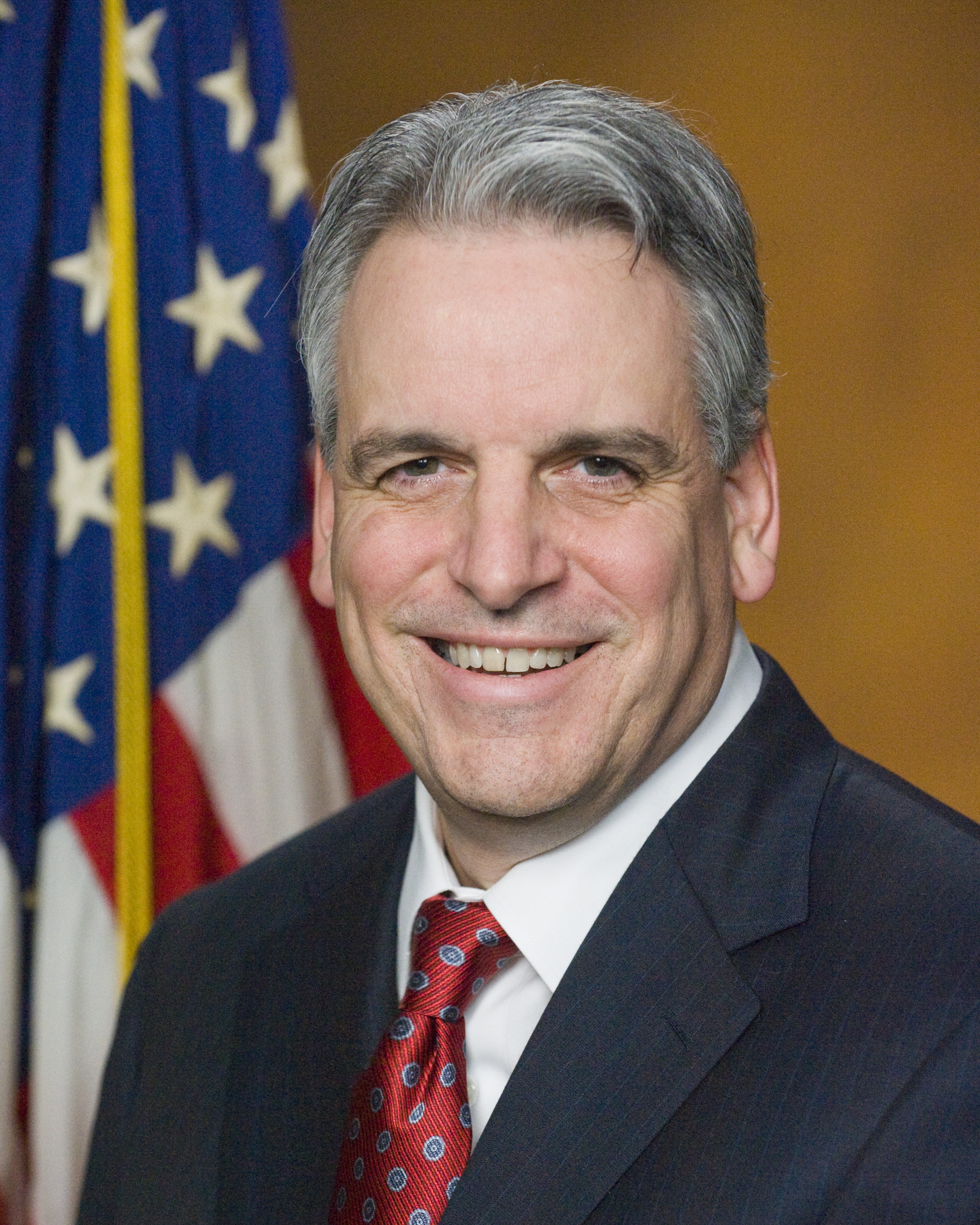
Peter Neronha

James Diossa

=== State Legislature ===
- President of the Senate: Dominick J. Ruggerio
  - Senate President Pro Tempore: Hanna Gallo
  - Senate Majority Leader: Michael McCaffrey
  - Senate Majority Whip: Maryellen Goodwin
  - Senate Deputy Majority Whip: Ana Quezada
- Speaker of the House: Joe Shekarchi
  - House Speaker Pro Tempore: Brian Patrick Kennedy
  - House Majority Leader: Christopher Blazejewski
  - House Majority Whip: Katherine Kazarian

== Party leadership and staff ==
The leadership of the Rhode Island Democratic Party, as of 2024, is as follows:

=== State committee officers ===
- Chairman: Elizabeth Perik
- 1st Vice Chairman: James Diossa

=== National Committee Persons ===
- National Committeeman: Joseph R. Paolino Jr.
- National Committeewomen: Lisa Andoscia

=== Staff ===
- Data Director: Sam Bader
- Strategic Planning Consultant: Anthony Cherry
- Compliance Consultant: Susann Della Rosa

== Previous election results ==
=== 2020 general election ===
For President
Candidate	Party	Vote %	Votes
Joseph R. Biden	Democratic	59.4	307,486
Donald J. Trump	Republican	38.6	199,922

For U.S. Senator
Candidate	Party	Vote %
John F. Reed	Democratic	66.2
Allen R. Waters	Republican	33.4

For U.S. Representative — District 1
Candidate	Party	Vote %
David N. Cicilline	Democratic	70.8
Frederick Wysocki	Independent	15.8
Jeffrey E. Lemire	Independent	12.6

For U.S. Representative — District 2
Candidate	Party	Vote %
James R. Langevin	Democratic	58.2
Robert B. Lancia	Republican	41.5

=== 2018 general election ===
For U.S. Senator
Candidate	Party	Vote %
Sheldon Whitehouse	Democratic	61.4
Robert G. Flanders Jr.	Republican	38.3

For U.S. Representative — District 1
Candidate	Party	Vote %
David N. Cicilline	Democratic	66.7
Patrick J. Donovan	Republican	33.1

For U.S. Representative — District 2
Candidate	Party	Vote %
James R. Langevin	Democratic	63.5
Salvatore G. Caiozzo	Republican	36.3

=== 2016 general election ===
For President
Candidate	Party	Vote %	Votes
Hillary Clinton	Democratic	54.4	252,525
Donald J. Trump	Republican	38.9	180,453

For U.S. Representative — District 1
Candidate	Party	Vote %
David N. Cicilline	Democratic	64.5
Russell Taub	Republican	35.1

For U.S. Representative — District 2
Candidate	Party	Vote %
James R. Langevin	Democratic	58.1
Rhue Reis	Republican	30.7

=== 2014 general election ===
For U.S. Senator
Candidate	Party	Vote %
John F. Reed	Democratic	70.6
Mark S. Zaccaria	Republican	29.2

For U.S. Representative — District 1
Candidate	Party	Vote %
David N. Cicilline	Democratic	59.5
Cormick B. Lynch	Republican	40.2

For U.S. Representative — District 2
Candidate	Party	Vote %
James R. Langevin	Democratic	62.2
Rhue R. Reis	Republican	37.6

=== 2008 general election ===
For President
Candidate	Party	Vote %
Barack Obama	Democratic	63.1
John McCain	Republican	35.2

For U.S. Senator
Candidate	Party	Vote %
John F. Reed	Democratic	73.4
Robert G. Tingle	Republican	26.6

For U.S. Representative — District 1
Candidate	Party	Vote %
Patrick J. Kennedy	Democratic	68.6
Jonathon P. Scott	Republican	24.3

For U.S. Representative — District 2
Candidate	Party	Vote %
James R. Langevin	Democratic	70.1
Mark S. Zaccaria	Republican	29.9

=== 2004 general election ===
For President
Candidate	Party	Vote %
John F. Kerry	Democratic	59.4
George W. Bush	Republican	38.6

For U.S. Representative — District 1
Candidate	Party	Vote %
Patrick J. Kennedy	Democratic	64.1
David W. Rogers	Republican	35.8

For U.S. Representative — District 2
Candidate	Party	Vote %
James R. Langevin	Democratic	74.5
Arthur Chuck Barton III	Republican	20.8

=== Federal ===
==== U.S. House ====
Election	Votes	%	Seats (RI)	±	%
2016	263,648	61.10	2 / 2	0	0.44
2018	242,575	64.98	2 / 2	0	3.38
2020	312,636	64.01	2 / 2	0	0.97
2022	201,750	56.38	2 / 2	0	7.63
2024	292,791	60.42	2 / 2	0	4.04
2026	233,127	64.96	2 / 2	0	4.54

=== State ===
==== Executive offices ====
Governor
Election	Candidate	Votes	%	Result
1976	J. Joseph Garrahy	218,561	54.82%	Won ✓
1978	J. Joseph Garrahy	197,386	62.79%	Won ✓
1980	J. Joseph Garrahy	299,174	73.71%	Won ✓
1982	J. Joseph Garrahy	247,208	73.30%	Won ✓
1984	Anthony J. Solomon	163,311	39.99%	Lost ✗
1986	Bruce Sundlun	104,504	32.38%	Lost ✗
1988	Bruce Sundlun	196,925	49.17%	Lost ✗
1990	Bruce Sundlun	264,411	74.15%	Won ✓
1992	Bruce Sundlun	261,484	61.55%	Won ✓
1994	Myrth York	157,361	43.54%	Lost ✗
1998	Myrth York	129,105	42.13%	Lost ✗
2002	Myrth York	150,229	45.21%	Lost ✗
2006	Charles Fogarty	189,503	48.99%	Lost ✗
2010	Frank T. Caprio	78,896	23.05%	Lost ✗
2014	Gina Raimondo	131,899	40.70%	Won ✓
2018	Gina Raimondo	198,122	52.64%	Won ✓
2022	Dan McKee	207,166	57.92%	Won ✓
2026	Helena Foulkes	207,580	57.71%	Won ✓
