= Brian Thompson (politician) =

American politician

Brian J. Thompson (born c. 1981) is an American politician from Rhode Island.

Thompson has lived in Woonsocket, Rhode Island, since 2005. Prior to pursuing political office, Thompson was a construction foreman. He is married to Christine, which whom he raised six children.

Thompson won a single term on the Woonsocket City Council, taking office in 2022.

After incumbent Roger Picard announced his retirement from the Rhode Island Senate in 2024, Thompson began campaigning for the 20th district seat. He finished ahead of Denis Collins and Marian Juskuv in a three-way Democratic Party primary, and won the general election unopposed.
