= 2024 United States House of Representatives elections in Rhode Island =

- November 5, 2024

Both Rhode Island seats to the United States House of Representatives
	Majority party	Minority party
Party	Democratic	Republican
Last election	2	0
Seats won	2	0
Seat change	Steady	Steady
Popular vote	292,791	180,123
Percentage	60.42%	37.17%
Swing	▲4.04%	▼4.76%

Democratic
40–50%
50–60%
60–70%
70–80%
Republican
50–60%

The 2024 United States House of Representatives elections in Rhode Island were held on November 5, 2024, to elect the two U.S. representatives from the state of Rhode Island, one from each of the state's congressional districts. The elections coincided with the 2024 U.S. presidential election, as well as other elections to the House of Representatives, elections to the United States Senate, and various state and local elections. The primary elections took place on September 10, 2024.

== District 1 ==
2024 Rhode Island's 1st congressional district election
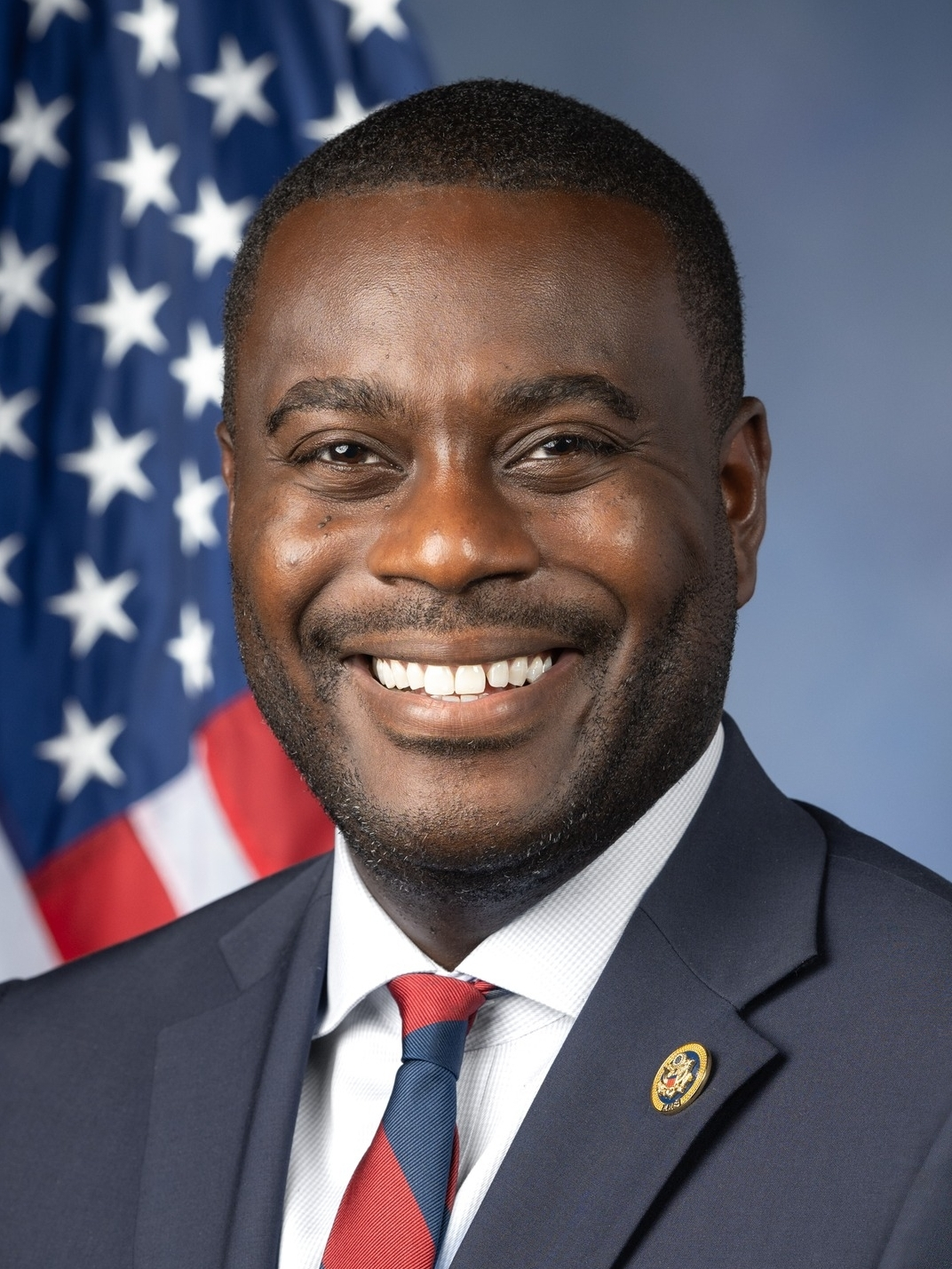

Nominee	Gabe Amo	Allen Waters
Party	Democratic	Republican
Popular vote	139,352	70,742
Percentage	63.0%	32.0%
- Municipality results Amo: 40–50% 50–60% 60–70% 70–80% 80–90%
U.S. Representative before election
Gabe Amo
Democratic
Elected U.S. Representative
Gabe Amo
Democratic

The incumbent is Democrat Gabe Amo, who was elected with 64.7% of the vote in a 2023 special election. The seat was previously held by David Cicilline who resigned to become president of a nonprofit organization.

=== Democratic primary ===
==== Nominee ====
- Gabe Amo, incumbent U.S. Representative

==== Disqualified ====
- Eddy Medrano

==== Endorsements ====
Gabe Amo

Organizations

- AIPAC
- Democratic Majority for Israel
- Humane Society Legislative Fund
- Jewish Democratic Council of America
- League of Conservation Voters
- Clean Water Action

Labor unions

- National Education Association
- United Auto Workers

==== Fundraising ====
Campaign finance reports as of March 31, 2024
Candidate	Raised	Spent	Cash on hand
Gabe Amo (D)	$1,583,547	$1,072,520	$511,027
Source: Federal Election Commission

==== Results ====
Democratic primary results
Party	Candidate	Votes	%
Democratic	Gabe Amo (incumbent)	26,696	100.0
Total votes		26,696	100.0

=== Republican primary ===
==== Nominee ====
- Allen Waters, financial consultant, and nominee for this district in 2022 and U.S. Senate in 2020

==== Disqualified ====
- Jeffrey Lemire, construction worker and perennial candidate

==== Results ====
Republican primary results
Party	Candidate	Votes	%
Republican	Allen Waters	5,033	100.0
Total votes		5,033	100.0

=== Independents ===
==== Declared ====
- CD Reynolds, perennial candidate

=== General election ===
==== Predictions ====
Source	Ranking	As of
The Cook Political Report	Solid D	February 2, 2023
Inside Elections	Solid D	March 10, 2023
Sabato's Crystal Ball	Safe D	February 23, 2023
Elections Daily	Safe D	September 7, 2023
CNalysis	Solid D	November 16, 2023

==== Polling ====
Poll source	Date(s) administered	Sample size (Note: Key: A – all adults RV – registered voters LV – likely voters V – unclear)	Margin of error	Gabe Amo (D)	Allen Waters (R)	Undecided
Embold Research (Note: Poll sponsored by Salve Regina University Pell Center for International Relations and Public Policy.)	September 16–20, 2024	(LV)	± 3.5%	56%	27%	16%
Embold Research	June 5–14, 2024	(LV)	± 2.8%	50%	29%	18%

==== Results ====
2024 Rhode Island's 1st congressional district election
Party	Candidate	Votes	%
Democratic	Gabe Amo (incumbent)	139,352	63.0
Republican	Allen Waters	70,742	32.0
Independent	CD Reynolds	10,463	4.7
Write-in		561	0.3
Total votes		221,118	100.0
Democratic hold			

== District 2 ==
2024 Rhode Island's 2nd congressional district election
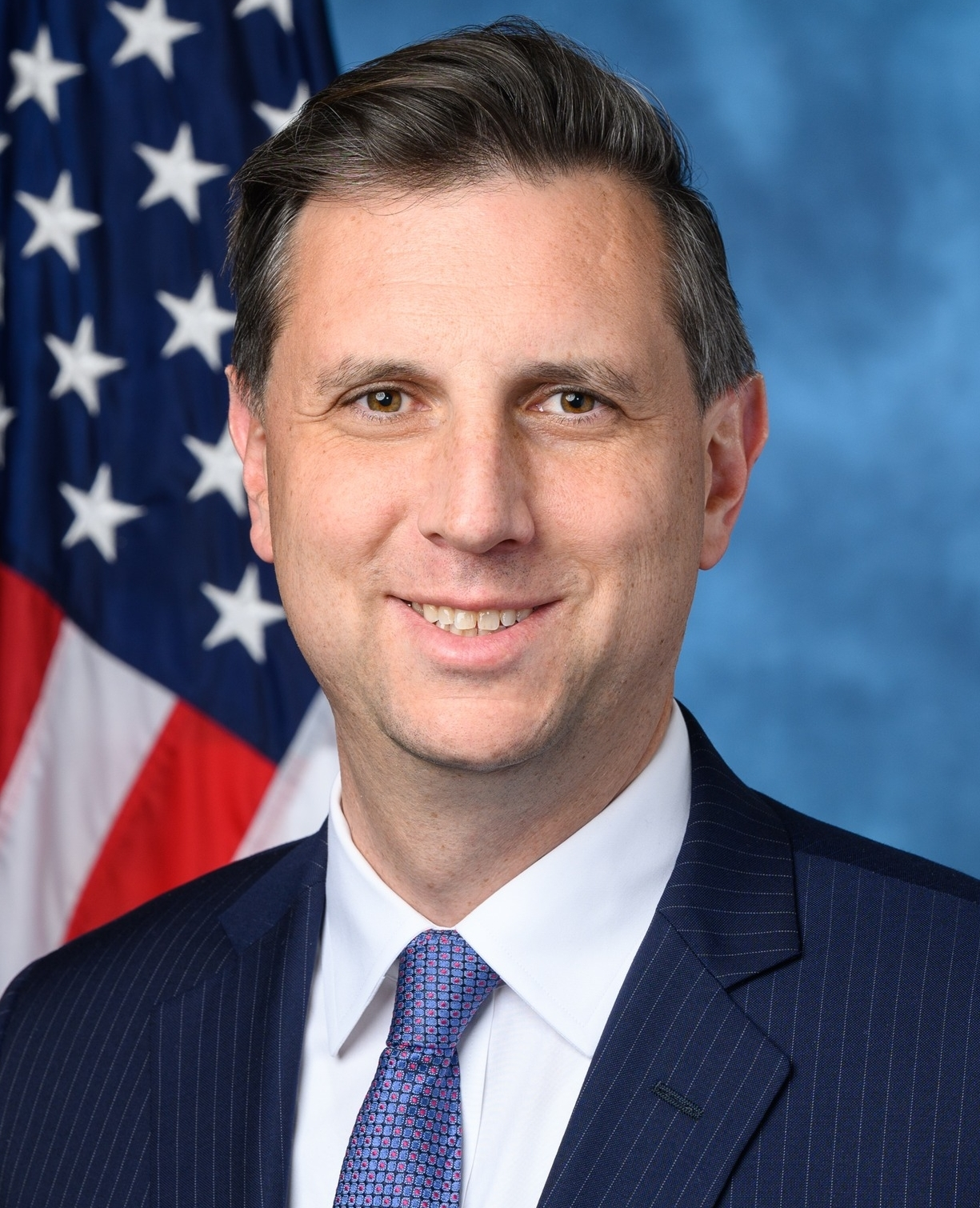

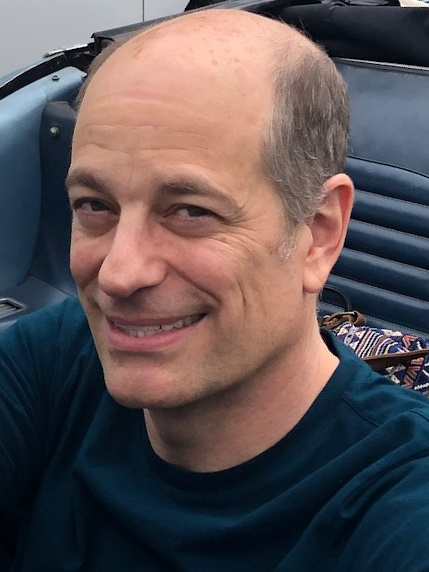
Nominee	Seth Magaziner	Steve Corvi
Party	Democratic	Republican
Popular vote	153,439	109,381
Percentage	58.2%	41.5%
- Municipality results Magaziner: 50–60% 60–70% 70–80% Corvi: 50–60%
U.S. Representative before election
Seth Magaziner
Democratic
Elected U.S. Representative
Seth Magaziner
Democratic

The incumbent is Democrat Seth Magaziner, who was elected with 50.4% of the vote in 2022.

Kamala Harris won the district over Donald Trump by a 7% margin in the concurrent presidential election. Magaziner's nearly 17% win represented one of the largest Democratic overperformances of the 2024 election cycle.

=== Democratic primary ===
==== Nominee ====
- Seth Magaziner, incumbent U.S. Representative

==== Endorsements ====
Seth Magaziner

U.S representatives

- Seth Moulton, MA-06 (2015–present)

Organizations

- Democratic Majority for Israel
- Humane Society Legislative Fund
- Jewish Democratic Council of America
- Joint Action Committee for Political Affairs
- J Street PAC
- League of Conservation Voters
- Clean Water Action

Labor unions

- Association of Flight Attendants
- National Education Association

==== Fundraising ====
Campaign finance reports as of March 31, 2024
Candidate	Raised	Spent	Cash on hand
Seth Magaziner (D)	$1,384,615	$404,644	$1,020,594
Source: Federal Election Commission

==== Results ====
Democratic primary results
Party	Candidate	Votes	%
Democratic	Seth Magaziner (incumbent)	25,157	100.0
Total votes		25,157	100.0

=== Republican primary ===
==== Nominee ====
- Steve Corvi, adjunct professor

==== Declined ====
- Allan Fung, former mayor of Cranston (2009–2021), nominee for this district in 2022, and nominee for Governor of Rhode Island in 2014 and 2018

==== Results ====
Republican primary results
Party	Candidate	Votes	%
Republican	Steve Corvi	10,542	100.0
Total votes		10,542	100.0

=== General election ===
==== Predictions ====
Source	Ranking	As of
The Cook Political Report	Solid D	February 2, 2023
Inside Elections	Solid D	March 10, 2023
Sabato's Crystal Ball	Safe D	February 23, 2023
Elections Daily	Safe D	September 7, 2023
CNalysis	Solid D	November 16, 2023

==== Polling ====
Poll source	Date(s) administered	Sample size	Margin of error	Seth Magaziner (D)	Steven Corvi (R)	Undecided
Embold Research	September 16–20, 2024	(LV)	± 3.5%	50%	37%	12%
Embold Research	June 5–14, 2024	(LV)	± 2.8%	47%	33%	17%

==== Results ====
2024 Rhode Island's 2nd congressional district election
Party	Candidate	Votes	%
Democratic	Seth Magaziner (incumbent)	153,439	58.2
Republican	Steve Corvi	109,381	41.5
Write-in		660	0.3
Total votes		263,480	100.0
Democratic hold			

== Notes ==
Partisan clients
