= 2016 United States House of Representatives elections in Rhode Island =

- November 8, 2016

Both Rhode Island seats to the United States House of Representatives
	Majority party	Minority party
Party	Democratic	Republican
Last election	2	0
Seats won	2	0
Seat change	Steady	Steady
Popular vote	263,648	141,324
Percentage	61.10%	32.75%
Swing	▲0.14%	▼6.05%

Democratic
40–50%
50–60%
60–70%
70–80%
80–90%
Republican
40–50%
50–60%

The 2016 United States House of Representatives elections in Rhode Island were held on November 8, 2016, to elect the two U.S. representatives from the state of Rhode Island, one from each of the state's 2 congressional districts. The elections coincided with the 2016 U.S. presidential election, as well as other elections to the House of Representatives, elections to the United States Senate and various state and local elections. The primaries took place on September 13.

== Overview ==
Results of the 2016 United States House of Representatives elections in Rhode Island by district:

District	Democratic		Republican		Others		Total		Result
District	Votes	%	Votes	%	Votes	%	Votes	%	Result
District 1	130,540	64.50%	71,023	35.09%	814	0.40%	202,377	100.0%	Democratic hold
District 2	133,108	58.09%	70,301	30.68%	25,739	11.23%	229,148	100.0%	Democratic hold
Total	263,648	61.10%	141,324	32.75%	26,553	6.15%	431,525	100.0%	

== District 1 ==
2016 Rhode Island's 1st congressional district election
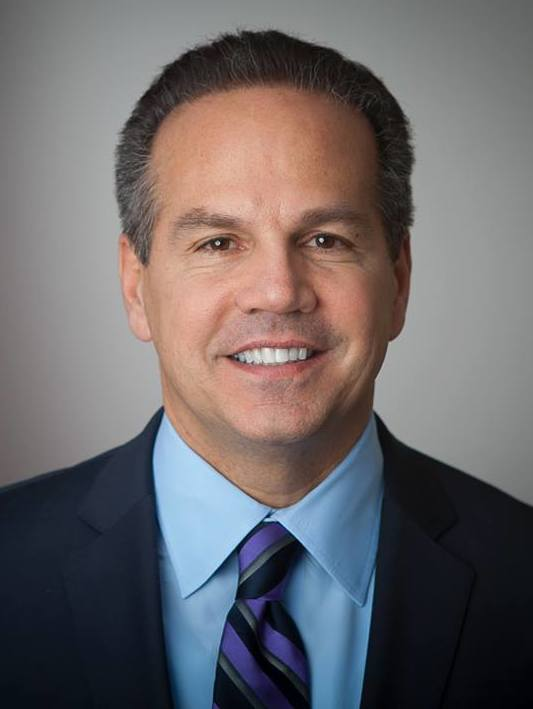

Nominee	David Cicilline	Harold Russell Taub
Party	Democratic	Republican
Popular vote	130,540	71,023
Percentage	64.5%	35.1%
- County results Cicilline: 50–60% 60–70%
U.S. Representative before election
David Cicilline
Democratic
Elected U.S. Representative
David Cicilline
Democratic

Incumbent Democrat David Cicilline, who had represented the district since 2011, ran for re-election. He was re-elected with 60% of the vote in 2014. The district had a PVI of D+15.

=== Democratic primary ===
==== Candidates ====
===== Nominee =====
- David Cicilline, incumbent U.S. Representative

===== Declined =====
- Angel Taveras, former mayor of Providence

==== Results ====
Democratic primary results
Party	Candidate	Votes	%
Democratic	David Cicilline (incumbent)	24,136	67.6
Democratic	Christopher F. Young	11,594	32.4
Total votes		35,730	100.0

=== Republican primary ===
==== Candidates ====
===== Nominee =====
- H. Russell Taub, conservative activist

===== Declined =====
- Karen MacBeth, state representative

==== Results ====
Republican primary results
Party	Candidate	Votes	%
Republican	Harold Russell Taub	629	100.0

=== General election ===
==== Predictions ====
Source	Ranking	As of
The Cook Political Report	Safe D	November 7, 2016
Daily Kos Elections	Safe D	November 7, 2016
Rothenberg	Safe D	November 3, 2016
Sabato's Crystal Ball	Safe D	November 7, 2016
RCP	Safe D	October 31, 2016

==== Results ====
Rhode Island's 1st congressional district, 2016
Party	Candidate	Votes	%
Democratic	David Cicilline (incumbent)	130,540	64.5
Republican	Harold Russell Taub	71,023	35.1
Write-in		814	0.4
Total votes		202,371	100.0
Democratic hold			

== District 2 ==
2016 Rhode Island's 2nd congressional district election
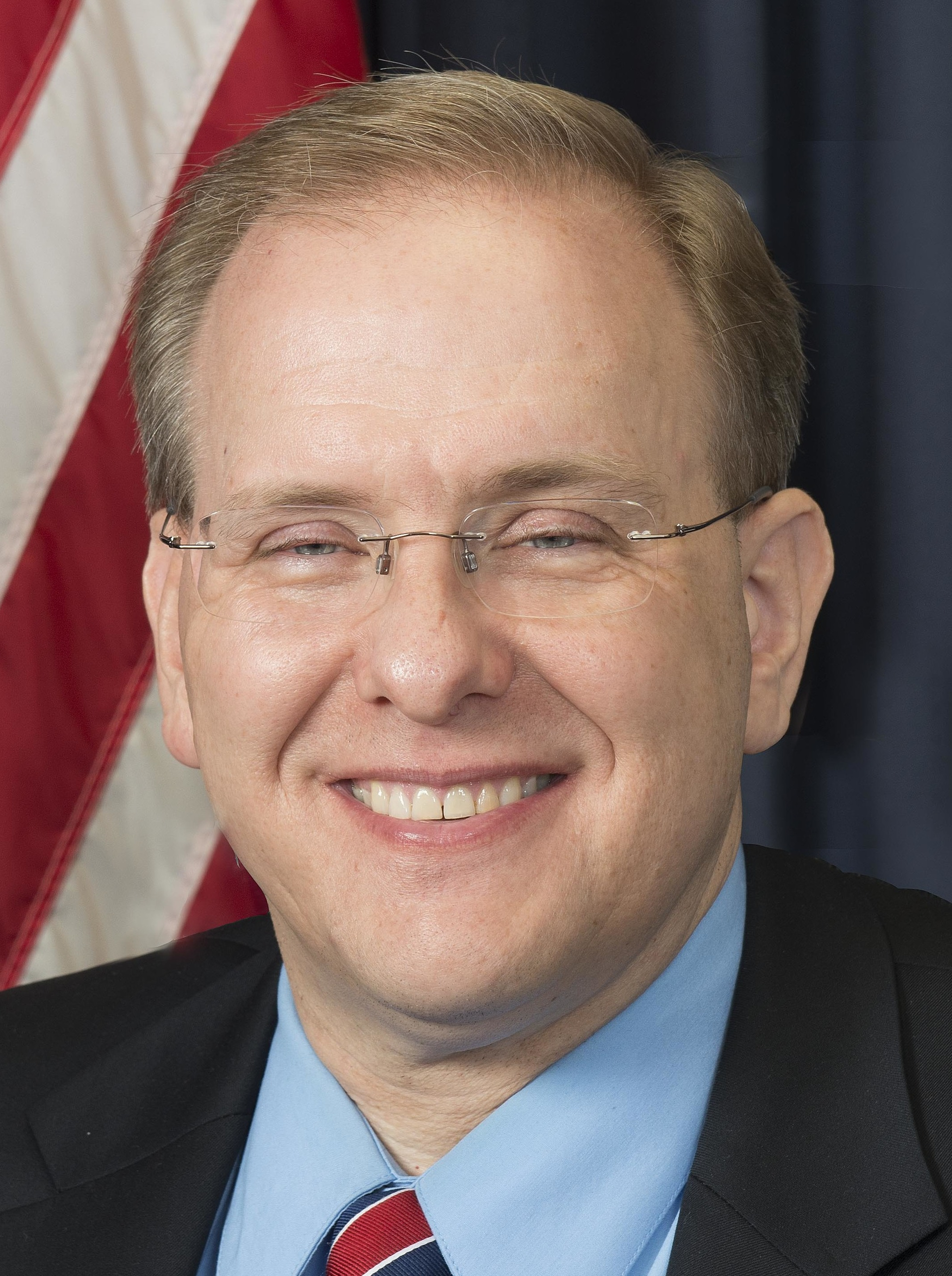

Nominee	James Langevin	Rhue R. Reis	Jeffrey Johnson
Party	Democratic	Republican	Independent
Popular vote	133,108	70,301	16,253
Percentage	58.1%	30.7%	7.1%
- Municipality results Langevin: 40–50% 50–60% 60–70% 70–80% Reis: 40–50%
U.S. Representative before election
James Langevin
Democratic
Elected U.S. Representative
James Langevin
Democratic

Incumbent Democrat James Langevin, who had represented the district since 2001, ran for re-election. He was re-elected with 62% of the vote in 2014. The district had a PVI of D+8.

=== Democratic primary ===
==== Candidates ====
===== Nominee =====
- James Langevin, incumbent U.S. Representative

===== Eliminated in primary =====
- John Hamilton, former state representative (1980–84), Bernie Sanders delegate to the 2016 Democratic National Convention
- Steven Archer, former Republican, veteran and candidate for state senate in 2014

==== Results ====
Langevin defeated both primary challengers handily, with 64.9% of the vote to Archer's 18.8% and Hamilton's 16.8% in the September 13 primary.

Democratic primary results
Party	Candidate	Votes	%
Democratic	James Langevin (incumbent)	16,334	64.4
Democratic	Steven Archer	4,768	18.8
Democratic	John D. Hamilton	4,272	16.8
Total votes		25,374	100.0

=== Republican primary ===
==== Candidates ====
===== Nominee =====
- Rhue R. Reis, house contractor, casino worker and nominee for this seat in 2014

==== Results ====
Republican primary results
Party	Candidate	Votes	%
Republican	Rhue R. Reis	641	100.0

=== Independent candidates ===
- Salvatore Caiozzo, small business owner, military veteran, and activist, founder of poisonedveterans.org
- Jeffrey Johnson, high school biology teacher and climate change activist, former Green Party candidate for lieutenant governor in 1994, and for state representative in 1998 and 2000

=== General election ===
==== Predictions ====
Source	Ranking	As of
The Cook Political Report	Safe D	November 7, 2016
Daily Kos Elections	Safe D	November 7, 2016
Rothenberg	Safe D	November 3, 2016
Sabato's Crystal Ball	Safe D	November 7, 2016
RCP	Safe D	October 31, 2016

==== Results ====
Rhode Island's 2nd congressional district, 2016
Party	Candidate	Votes	%
Democratic	James Langevin (incumbent)	133,108	58.1
Republican	Rhue R. Reis	70,301	30.7
Independent	Jeffrey C. Johnson	16,253	7.1
Independent	Salvatore G. Caiozzo	8,942	3.9
Write-in		544	0.2
Total votes		229,148	100.0
Democratic hold			

== See also ==
- United States House of Representatives elections, 2016
- United States elections, 2016

Official campaign websites
- District 1
  - David Cicilline for Congress
  - H. Russell Taub for Congress
- District 2
  - James Langevin for U.S. Congress
  - Elect Rhue Reis U.S. Congress
  - Jeff Johnson Archived 2016-09-24 at the Wayback Machine
  - Rhode Island First (Caiozzo)
  - John Hamilton for Congress
  - Archer for Congress
