= 2020 United States House of Representatives elections in Rhode Island =

- November 3, 2020

Both Rhode Island seats to the United States House of Representatives
	Majority party	Minority party	Third party
Party	Democratic	Republican	Independent
Last election	2	0	0
Seats won	2	0	0
Seat change	Steady	Steady	Steady
Popular vote	312,636	109,894	64,334
Percentage	64.01%	22.50%	13.17%
Swing	▼0.97%	▼12.28%	▲12.94%

Democratic
50–60%
60–70%
70–80%
80–90%
Republican
50–60%

The 2020 United States House of Representatives elections in Rhode Island were held on November 3, 2020, to elect the two U.S. representatives from the state of Rhode Island, one from each of the state's two congressional districts. The elections coincided with the 2020 U.S. presidential election, as well as other elections to the House of Representatives, elections to the United States Senate and various state and local elections.

== Overview ==
District	Democratic		Republican		Others		Total		Result
District	Votes	%	Votes	%	Votes	%	Votes	%	Result
District 1	158,550	70.83%	0	0.00%	65,310	29.17%	223,860	100.0%	Democratic hold
District 2	154,086	58.24%	109,894	41.54%	577	0.22%	264,557	100.0%	Democratic hold
Total	312,636	64.01%	109,894	22.50%	64,334	13.17%	488,417	100.0%	

Popular vote
Democratic	64.01%
Republican	22.50%
Other	13.17%

House seats
Democratic	100.00%

== District 1 ==
2020 Rhode Island's 1st congressional district election
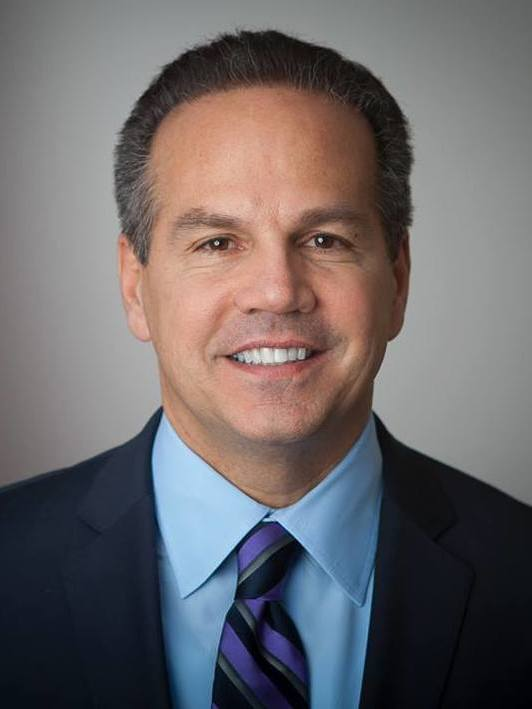

Nominee	David Cicilline	Frederick Wysocki	Jeffrey Lemire
Party	Democratic	Independent	Independent
Popular vote	158,550	35,457	28,300
Percentage	71.3%	15.9%	12.7%
- Municipality results Cicilline: 50–60% 60–70% 70–80% 80–90%
U.S. Representative before election
David Cicilline
Democratic
Elected U.S. Representative
David Cicilline
Democratic

The 1st district encompasses parts of Providence, as well as eastern Rhode Island, including Aquidneck Island and Pawtucket. The incumbent was Democrat David Cicilline, who was re-elected with 66.7% of the vote in 2018.

=== Democratic primary ===
==== Declared ====
- David Cicilline, incumbent U.S. Representative

==== Primary results ====
Democratic primary results
Party	Candidate	Votes	%
Democratic	David Cicilline (incumbent)	25,224	100.0
Total votes		25,224	100.0

=== Independents ===
==== Declared ====
- Jeffrey Lemire, perennial candidate
- Frederick Wysocki, financial advisor and candidate for Rhode Island's 1st congressional district in 2018

=== General election ===
==== Predictions ====
Source	Ranking	As of
The Cook Political Report	Safe D	July 2, 2020
Inside Elections	Safe D	June 2, 2020
Sabato's Crystal Ball	Safe D	July 2, 2020
Politico	Safe D	April 19, 2020
Daily Kos	Safe D	June 3, 2020
RCP	Safe D	June 9, 2020
Niskanen	Safe D	June 7, 2020

==== Results ====
Rhode Island's 1st congressional district, 2020
Party	Candidate	Votes	%
Democratic	David Cicilline (incumbent)	158,550	70.8
Independent	Frederick Wysocki	35,457	15.8
Independent	Jeffrey Lemire	28,300	12.6
Write-in		1,553	0.7
Total votes		223,860	100.0
Democratic hold			

==== By county ====
County	David Cicilline Democratic		Frederick Wysocki Independent		Jeffrey Lemire Independent		Various candidates Other parties		Margin		Total
County	#	%	#	%	#	%	#	%	#	%	Total
Bristol	18,038	68.7%	4,587	17.5%	3,438	13.1%	186	0.7%	13,451	51.2%	26,249
Newport	29,281	70.0%	7,229	17.3%	5,048	12.1%	248	0.6%	22,052	52.7%	41,806
Providence (part)	110,554	71.3%	23,613	15.2%	19,797	12.8%	1,118	0.7%	86,931	56.1%	155,072
Totals	158,550	70.8%	35,457	15.8%	28,300	12.6%	1,553	0.7%	123,093	55.0%	223,860

== District 2 ==
2020 Rhode Island's 2nd congressional district election
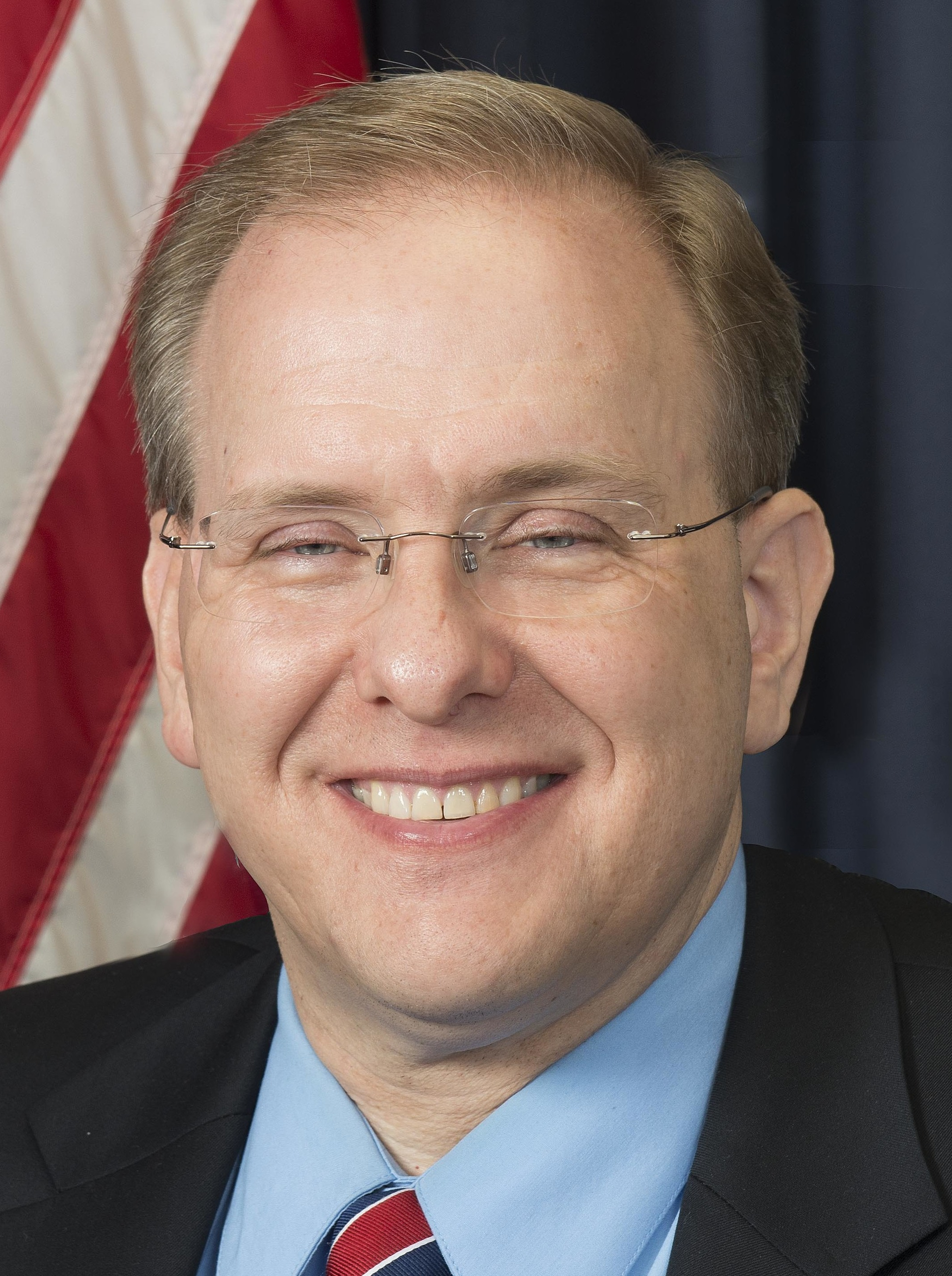

Nominee	James Langevin	Robert Lancia
Party	Democratic	Republican
Popular vote	154,086	109,894
Percentage	58.2%	41.5%
- Municipality results Langevin: 50–60% 60–70% 70–80% 80–90% Lancia: 50–60%
U.S. Representative before election
James Langevin
Democratic
Elected U.S. Representative
James Langevin
Democratic

The 2nd district also takes in parts of Providence, as well as western Rhode Island, including Coventry, Cranston, and Warwick. The incumbent was Democrat James Langevin, who was re-elected with 63.5% of the vote in 2018.

=== Democratic primary ===
==== Declared ====
- Dylan Conley, attorney and chair of the Providence Board of Licenses
- Jim Langevin, incumbent U.S. Representative

==== Primary results ====
Democratic primary results
Party	Candidate	Votes	%
Democratic	James Langevin (incumbent)	31,599	70.1
Democratic	Dylan Conley	13,482	29.8
Total votes		45,081	100.0

=== Republican primary ===
==== Candidates ====
===== Declared =====
- Robert Lancia, former state representative
- Donald Robbio, electrician and candidate for Rhode Island's 2nd congressional district in 2012

==== Primary results ====
Republican primary results
Party	Candidate	Votes	%
Republican	Robert Lancia	7,484	73.5
Republican	Donald Robbio	2,705	26.5
Total votes		10,189	100.0

=== General election ===
==== Predictions ====
Source	Ranking	As of
The Cook Political Report	Safe D	July 2, 2020
Inside Elections	Safe D	June 2, 2020
Sabato's Crystal Ball	Safe D	July 2, 2020
Politico	Safe D	April 19, 2020
Daily Kos	Safe D	June 3, 2020
RCP	Safe D	June 9, 2020
Niskanen	Safe D	June 7, 2020

==== Results ====
Rhode Island's 2nd congressional district, 2020
Party	Candidate	Votes	%
Democratic	James Langevin (incumbent)	154,086	58.2
Republican	Robert Lancia	109,894	41.5
Write-in		577	0.2
Total votes		264,557	100.0
Democratic hold			

==== By county ====
County	James Langevin Democratic		Bob Lancia Republican		Various candidates Other parties		Margin		Total
County	#	%	#	%	#	%	#	%	Total
Kent	50,218	55.8%	39,696	44.1%	152	0.2%	10,522	11.7%	90,066
Providence (part)	59,869	60.9%	38,198	38.9%	237	0.2%	21,671	22.0%	98,304
Washington	43,528	59.5%	29,524	40.3%	136	0.2%	14,004	19.2%	73,188
Totals	154,086	58.2%	109,894	41.5%	577	0.2%	44,192	16.7%	264,557

== See also ==
- 2020 United States elections
- 2020 United States Senate election in Rhode Island
- 2020 United States House of Representatives elections
- 2020 Rhode Island elections
