= 2022 United States House of Representatives elections in Rhode Island =

- November 8, 2022

Both Rhode Island seats to the United States House of Representatives
	Majority party	Minority party
Party	Democratic	Republican
Last election	2	0
Seats won	2	0
Seat change	Steady	Steady
Popular vote	201,750	150,024
Percentage	56.38%	41.93%
Swing	▼7.63%	▲19.43%

Democratic
50–60%
60–70%
70–80%
80–90%
Republican
40–50%
50–60%
60–70%

The 2022 United States House of Representatives elections in Rhode Island were held on November 8, 2022, to elect the two U.S. representatives from the state of Rhode Island, one from each of the state's 2 congressional districts. The elections coincided with other elections to the House of Representatives, elections to the United States Senate and various state and local elections. It followed a primary election on September 13, 2022.

In the leadup to the 2022 redistricting cycle, many analysts believed that Rhode Island would lose its 2nd district and be relegated to at-large status. However, the state managed to keep both its districts. This was credited to an aggressive effort by Rhode Island officials and community leaders to make sure that as many residents completed the 2020 census as possible. Coincidentally, the announcement that Rhode Island would not lose a district was made by U.S. Secretary of Commerce Gina Raimondo, who previously served as Governor of Rhode Island from 2015 until her resignation in 2021 to become Commerce Secretary. Incumbent U.S. Representatives David Cicilline and Jim Langevin, who would have been forced to run against each other in a Democratic primary if the two districts were merged, both expressed relief at the announcement.

This was the best U.S. House generic ballot for Republicans and the best a Republican candidate has done in a House race in the state since 1992.

== District 1 ==
2022 Rhode Island's 1st congressional district election
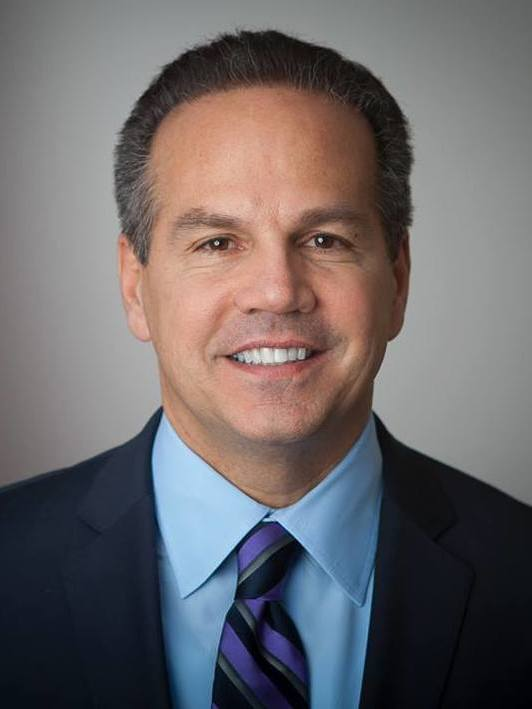

Nominee	David Cicilline	Allen Waters
Party	Democratic	Republican
Popular vote	100,318	56,055
Percentage	64.0%	35.8%
- Municipality results Cicilline: 50–60% 60–70% 70–80% 80–90% Waters: 50–60%
U.S. Representative before election
David Cicilline
Democratic
Elected U.S. Representative
David Cicilline
Democratic

Before redistricting, the 1st district encompassed parts of Providence, as well as eastern Rhode Island, including Aquidneck Island and Pawtucket. The incumbent is Democrat David Cicilline, who was re-elected with 70.8% of the vote in 2020.

=== Democratic primary ===
==== Candidates ====
===== Nominee =====
- David Cicilline, incumbent U.S. Representative

==== Endorsements ====
David Cicilline

Labor unions

- AFL–CIO Rhode Island
- National Education Association

Organizations

- Feminist Majority PAC
- League of Conservation Voters Action Fund
- Rhode Island Democratic Party

==== Results ====
Democratic primary results
Party	Candidate	Votes	%
Democratic	David Cicilline (incumbent)	46,610	100.0
Total votes		46,610	100.0

=== Republican primary ===
==== Candidates ====
===== Nominee =====
- Allen Waters, investment consultant and nominee for U.S. Senate in 2020

==== Results ====
Republican primary results
Party	Candidate	Votes	%
Republican	Allen Waters	6,975	100.0
Total votes		6,975	100.0

=== Independents ===
==== Candidates ====
===== Declared =====
- Lenine Camacho
- Jeffrey Lemire

=== General election ===
==== Predictions ====
Source	Ranking	As of
The Cook Political Report	Solid D	February 22, 2022
Inside Elections	Solid D	March 28, 2022
Sabato's Crystal Ball	Safe D	February 23, 2022
Politico	Solid D	April 5, 2022
RCP	Safe D	June 9, 2022
Fox News	Solid D	July 11, 2022
DDHQ	Solid D	July 20, 2022
538	Solid D	June 30, 2022
The Economist	Safe D	September 28, 2022

==== Results ====
2022 Rhode Island's 1st congressional district election
Party	Candidate	Votes	%
Democratic	David Cicilline (incumbent)	100,318	64.0
Republican	Allen Waters	56,055	35.8
Write-in		361	0.2
Total votes		156,734	100.0
Democratic hold			

==== By county ====
County	David Cicilline Democratic		Allen Waters Republican		Various candidates Other parties		Margin		Total
County	#	%	#	%	#	%	#	%	Total
Bristol	13,072	63.7%	7,395	36.1%	42	0.2%	5,677	27.6%	20,509
Newport	20,629	63.8%	11,685	36.1%	42	0.1%	8,944	27.7%	32,356
Providence (part)	66,523	64.1%	36,971	35.6%	277	0.3%	29,552	28.5%	103,771
Totals	100,318	64.0%	56,055	35.8%	361	0.2%	44,263	28.2%	156,734

== District 2 ==
2022 Rhode Island's 2nd congressional district election
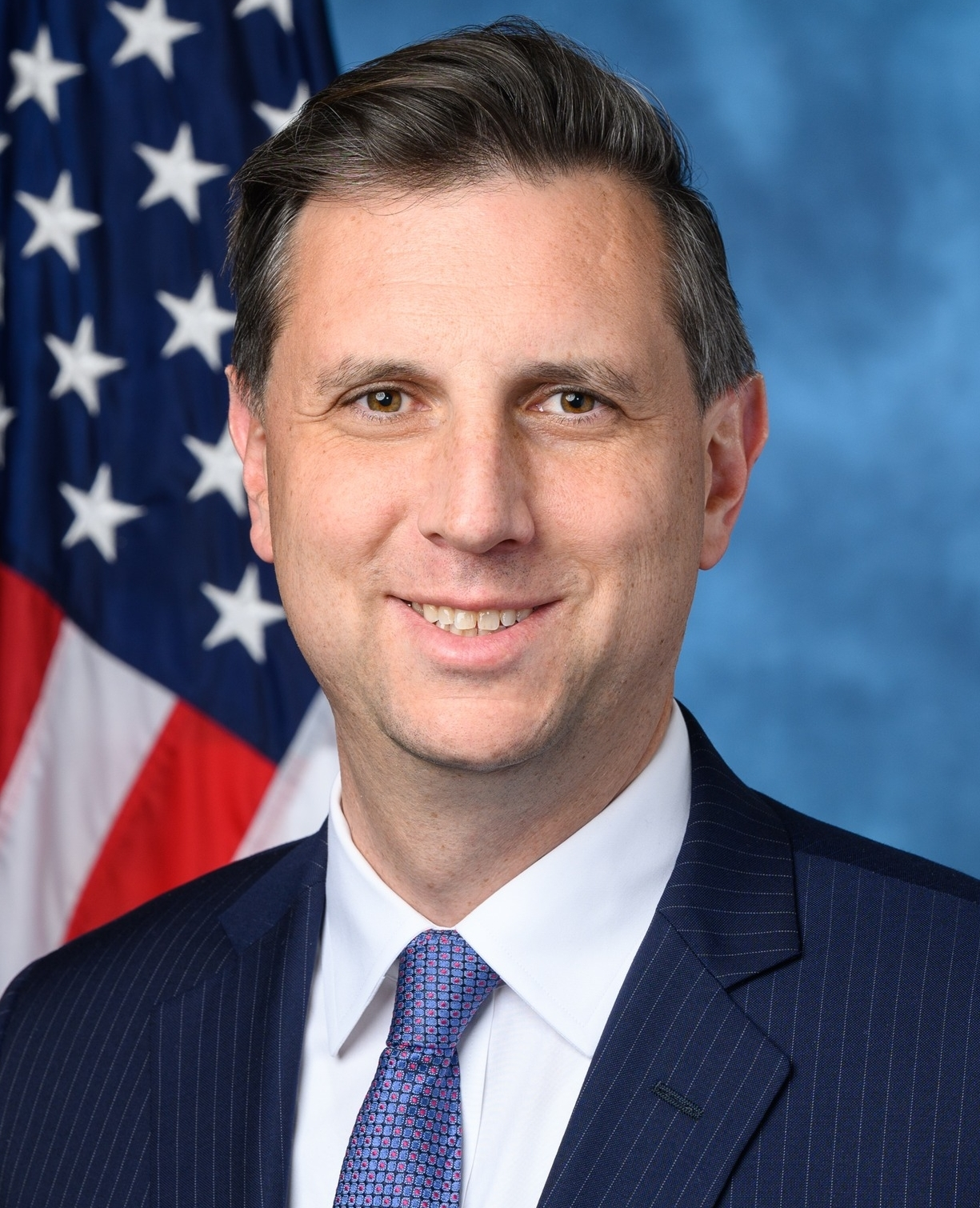

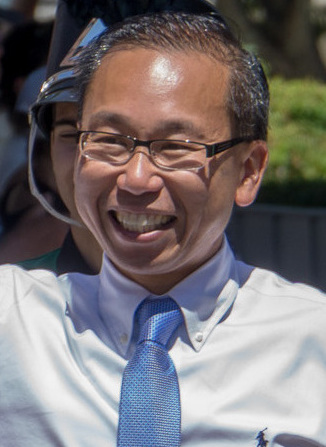
Nominee	Seth Magaziner	Allan Fung
Party	Democratic	Republican
Popular vote	101,432	93,969
Percentage	50.4%	46.7%
- Municipality results Magaziner: 50–60% 60–70% 70–80% Fung: 40–50% 50–60% 60–70%
U.S. Representative before election
James Langevin
Democratic
Elected U.S. Representative
Seth Magaziner
Democratic

Before redistricting, the 2nd district also took in parts of Providence, as well as western Rhode Island, including Coventry, Cranston, and Warwick. The incumbent is Democrat Jim Langevin, who was re-elected with 58.2% of the vote in 2020. On January 18, 2022, Langevin announced he would not seek re-election. General Treasurer Seth Magaziner would emerge from a crowded Democratic primary field, while the Republicans would nominate former Cranston mayor Allan Fung, who had previously been the GOP's nominee for Governor in 2014 and 2018.

Despite being the slight favorite in the race, Fung lost in a minor upset to Democratic nominee Seth Magaziner 50% to 47%.

=== Democratic primary ===
==== Candidates ====
===== Nominee =====
- Seth Magaziner, Rhode Island General Treasurer and former candidate for Governor of Rhode Island in 2022

===== Eliminated in primary =====
- Omar Bah, journalist and founder and executive director of the Refugee Dream Center
- Spencer Dickinson, former state representative and candidate for Governor of Rhode Island in 2018
- Joy Fox, former staffer to incumbent Jim Langevin
- Sarah Morgenthau, deputy assistant secretary for travel and tourism in the U.S. Department of Commerce and former member of the Rhode Island Governor's Homeland Security Advisory Board
- David Segal, former state representative and candidate for the 1st district in 2010

===== Withdrew =====
- Cameron Moquin, former firefighter (endorsed Segal)
- Michael Neary, political strategist and former John Kasich staffer
- Ed Pacheco, former state representative and former chair of the Rhode Island Democratic Party

===== Declined =====
- Nicole Alexander-Scott, former director of the Rhode Island Department of Health
- Gabe Amo, deputy director of the Office of Intergovernmental Affairs
- Sam Bell, state senator
- Dylan Conley, chair of the Providence Board of Licenses, son of former state senator William Conley Jr., and candidate for this district in 2020
- Brendan Doherty, former Superintendent of the Rhode Island State Police and Republican nominee for the 1st district in 2012 (Note: Doherty switched to the Democratic Party in 2014.)
- Jorge Elorza, Mayor of Providence
- Helena Foulkes, former CVS executive (running for governor)
- Nellie Gorbea, Rhode Island Secretary of State (running for governor)
- Jim Langevin, incumbent U.S. Representative (endorsed Magaziner)
- Sabina Matos, Lieutenant Governor of Rhode Island (running for re-election)
- Nicholas Mattiello, former Speaker of the Rhode Island House of Representatives
- Carol McEntee, state representative
- Joshua Miller, state senator (running for reelection)
- James Sheehan, former state senator
- Joe Shekarchi, Speaker of the Rhode Island House of Representatives
- Teresa Tanzi, state representative

==== Endorsements ====
Joy Fox

Statewide officials

- Elizabeth Roberts, former lieutenant governor of Rhode Island
Sarah Morgenthau

Federal officials

- Cory Booker, U.S. Senator from New Jersey (2013–)
- Kirsten Gillibrand, U.S. Senator from New York (2009–)
- Jeh Johnson, former United States Secretary of Homeland Security (2013-2017)
- Donna Shalala, former U.S. Representative for Florida's 27th congressional district (2019-2021) and former United States Secretary of Health and Human Services (1993-2001)

Individuals

- Alan Hassenfeld, CEO of Hasbro Toys
David Segal

Federal officials

- Bernie Sanders, U.S. Senator from Vermont (2007–present) and candidate for president in 2016 and 2020 (Independent)
- Elizabeth Warren, U.S. Senator from Massachusetts (2013–present) and candidate for president in 2020

Individuals

- Jane Fonda, actress
- Bill McKibben, founder of 350.org

Labor unions

- Communications Workers of America

Organizations

- Center for Biological Diversity Action
- Democracy for America
- Friends of the Earth Action
- Our Revolution
- Progressive Change Campaign Committee
- Progressive Democrats of America

==== Forums and debates ====
2022 Rhode Island's 2nd congressional district democratic primary forum & debates
No.	Date	Host	Moderator	Link	Democratic	Democratic	Democratic	Democratic	Democratic	Democratic
Key: P Participant A Absent N Not invited I Invited W Withdrawn										
Key: P Participant A Absent N Not invited I Invited W Withdrawn					Omar Bah	Spencer Dickinson	Joy Fox	Seth Magaziner	Sarah Morgenthau	David Segal
1	Aug. 18, 2022	Temple Sinai			P	N	P	P	P	P
2	Aug. 30, 2022	WPRI-TV	Ted Nesi; Tim White		N	N	P	P	P	P
3	Sep. 6, 2022	WJAR	Gene Valicenti		P	A (Note: Hospitalized.)	P	P	P	P

==== Polling ====
Poll source	Date(s) administered	Sample size (Note: Key: A – all adults RV – registered voters LV – likely voters V – unclear)	Margin of error	Omar Bah	Spencer Dickinson	Joy Fox	Seth Magaziner	Cameron Moquin	Sarah Morgenthau	David Segal	Other	Undecided
Fleming & Associates	August 7–10, 2022	252 (LV)	± 6.2%	3%	1%	4%	37%	–	8%	8%	–	37%
Suffolk University	June 19–22, 2022	175 (LV)	± 7.5%	3%	–	8%	30%	3%	3%	8%	2%	42%
RMG Research	June 14–18, 2022	300 (LV)	± 5.7%	–	–	7%	31%	–	9%	8%	–	41%
Fleming & Associates	May 9–12, 2022	250 (LV)	± 6.2%	0%	–	4%	33%	1%	4%	5%	–	50%

==== Results ====
Democratic primary results
Party	Candidate	Votes	%
Democratic	Seth Magaziner	30,309	54.0
Democratic	David Segal	9,067	16.2
Democratic	Sarah Morgenthau	6,696	11.9
Democratic	Joy Fox	6,112	10.9
Democratic	Omar Bah	2,600	4.6
Democratic	Spencer Dickinson	1,318	2.3
Total votes		56,102	100.0

=== Republican primary ===
==== Candidates ====
===== Nominee =====
- Allan Fung, former mayor of Cranston and nominee for Governor of Rhode Island in 2014 and 2018

===== Withdrew =====
- Jessica de la Cruz, state senator (endorsed Fung)
- Robert Lancia, former state representative and nominee for this district in 2020

==== Polling ====
Poll source	Date(s) administered	Sample size	Margin of error	Allan Fung	Robert Lancia	Other	Undecided
Suffolk University	June 19–22, 2022	102 (LV)	± 9.7%	67%	15%	5%	14%

==== Results ====
Republican primary results
Party	Candidate	Votes	%
Republican	Allan Fung	12,113	100.0
Total votes		12,113	100.0

=== Moderate Party ===
==== Candidates ====
===== Declared =====
- William Gilbert, shipbuilding company employee and perennial candidate

=== Independents ===
==== Candidates ====
===== Declared =====
- Don Antonia
- Patricia Landy, school teacher
- John D. Ritchie

=== General election ===
==== Forums & debates ====
2022 Rhode Island's 2nd congressional district candidate forums & debates
No.	Date	Host	Moderator	Link	Democratic	Republican	Moderate
Key: P Participant A Absent N Not invited I Invited W Withdrawn							
Key: P Participant A Absent N Not invited I Invited W Withdrawn					Seth Magaziner	Allan Fung	William Gilbert
1	October 17, 2022	The Providence Journal; The Public's Radio; University of Rhode Island			P	P	P
2	October 18, 2022	WPRI-TV	Ted Nesi; Tim White		P	P	N
3	November 3, 2022	North Kingstown; High School			P	N	P
4	November 4, 2022	WJAR	Gene Valicenti		P	P	N

==== Predictions ====
Source	Ranking	As of
The Cook Political Report	Tossup	June 28, 2022
Inside Elections	Tossup	November 3, 2022
Sabato's Crystal Ball	Lean R (flip)	November 7, 2022
Politico	Tossup	October 12, 2022
RCP	Lean R (flip)	October 7, 2022
Fox News	Tossup	October 11, 2022
DDHQ	Tossup	October 28, 2022
538	Tossup	October 12, 2022
The Economist	Tossup	October 12, 2022

==== Endorsements ====
Seth Magaziner (D)

Federal officials

- Jake Auchincloss, U.S. Representative for Massachusetts's 4th congressional district (2021–)
- David Cicilline, U.S. Representative for Rhode Island's 1st congressional district (2011–)
- Jim Langevin, incumbent U.S. Representative
- Jack Reed, U.S. Senator for Rhode Island (1997–)
- Claudine Schneider, former U.S. Representative for Rhode Island's 2nd congressional district (1981–1991)
- Sheldon Whitehouse, U.S. Senator for Rhode Island (2007–)

State legislators

- Dawson Hodgson, former state senator (2011–2015) and Republican nominee for Attorney General in 2014 (Republican)
- Robert Nardolillo, former state representative (2015–2018) (Republican)

Local officials

- Robert Ferri, Cranston city councilman

Organizations

- Giffords
- Humane Society of the United States Legislative Fund
- League of Conservation Voters Action Fund
- National Organization for Women PAC
- Rhode Island Democratic Party

Labor unions

- AFL–CIO Rhode Island
- Carpenters Local 330
- International Brotherhood of Electrical Workers Local 99 & Local 2323
- International Union of Painters and Allied Trades District Council 11
- Ironworkers Local 37
- National Education Association
- Unite Here Local 26
- United Auto Workers Region 9A
- United Food and Commercial Workers Local 328
- United Nurses and Allied Professionals
Allan Fung (R)

State officials

- Charlie Baker, Governor of Massachusetts (2015–2023)
- Chris Christie, Governor of New Jersey (2010–2018)
- Larry Hogan, Governor of Maryland (2015–2023)

State legislators

- Jessica de la Cruz, Minority Leader of the Rhode Island Senate (2022–present) and member of the Rhode Island Senate from the 23rd district (2019–present)

Local officials

- Francis Suarez, Mayor of Miami (2017–present)

Individuals

- James Woods, actor

Organizations

- International Brotherhood of Police Officers
- Log Cabin Republicans
- National Federation of Independent Business
- Rhode Island Republican Party
- Tea Party Express
- United States Chamber of Commerce

==== Polling ====
Aggregate polls

Source of poll aggregation	Dates administered	Dates updated	Seth Magaziner (D)	Allan Fung (R)	Undecided (Note: Calculated by taking the difference of 100% and all other candidates combined.)	Margin
FiveThirtyEight	June 19 – October 24, 2022	October 26, 2022	41.2%	47.1%	11.7%	Fung +5.9

Graphical summary

Poll source	Date(s) administered	Sample size	Margin of error	Seth Magaziner (D)	Allan Fung (R)	William Gilbert (M)	Undecided
DCCC Targeting and Analytics (D)	October 23–24, 2022	812 (LV)	–	48%	48%	–	4%
The Mellman Group (D) (Note: This poll was sponsored by Magaziner's campaign)	October 1–4, 2022	400 (LV)	± 4.9%	40%	43%	5%	12%
Suffolk University	October 1–4, 2022	422 (LV)	± 3.9%	37%	45%	5%	13%
Fleming & Associates	September 29 – October 2, 2022	423 (LV)	± 4.8%	40%	46%	4%	10%
Suffolk University	June 19–22, 2022	423 (LV)	± 4.8%	39%	45%	–	17%
Public Opinion Strategies (R) (Note: This poll was sponsored by Fung's campaign)	May 23–26, 2022	– (LV)	–	35%	50%	–	15%

Hypothetical polling

Omar Bah vs. Allan Fung

Poll source	Date(s) administered	Sample size	Margin of error	Omar Bah (D)	Allan Fung (R)	Undecided
Suffolk University	June 19–22, 2022	423 (LV)	± 4.8%	34%	44%	22%

Joy Fox vs. Allan Fung

Poll source	Date(s) administered	Sample size	Margin of error	Joy Fox (D)	Allan Fung (R)	Undecided
Suffolk University	June 19–22, 2022	423 (LV)	± 4.8%	34%	45%	21%

Sarah Morgenthau vs. Allan Fung

Poll source	Date(s) administered	Sample size	Margin of error	Sarah Morgenthau (D)	Allan Fung (R)	Undecided
Suffolk University	June 19–22, 2022	423 (LV)	± 4.8%	35%	43%	22%

David Segal vs. Allan Fung

Poll source	Date(s) administered	Sample size	Margin of error	David Segal (D)	Allan Fung (R)	Undecided
Suffolk University	June 19–22, 2022	423 (LV)	± 4.8%	35%	45%	21%

Generic Democrat vs. generic Republican

Poll source	Date(s) administered	Sample size	Margin of error	Generic Democrat	Generic Republican	Undecided
Public Opinion Strategies (R)	May 23–26, 2022	– (LV)	–	38%	34%	28%

Cameron Moquin vs. Allan Fung

Poll source	Date(s) administered	Sample size	Margin of error	Cameron Moquin (D)	Allan Fung (R)	Undecided
Suffolk University	June 19–22, 2022	423 (LV)	± 4.8%	32%	46%	22%

==== Results ====
2022 Rhode Island's 2nd congressional district election
Party	Candidate	Votes	%
Democratic	Seth Magaziner	101,432	50.4
Republican	Allan Fung	93,969	46.7
Moderate	William Gilbert	5,489	2.7
Write-in		199	0.1
Total votes		201,089	100.0
Democratic hold			

==== By county ====
County	Seth Magaziner Democratic		Allan Fung Republican		Various candidates Other parties		Margin		Total
County	#	%	#	%	#	%	#	%	Total
Kent	33,195	48.4%	33,298	48.5%	2,110	3.1%	-103	-2.1%	68,603
Providence (part)	36,356	49.6%	35,247	48.1%	1,720	2.3%	1,109	1.5%	73,323
Washington	31,806	53.8%	25,422	43.0%	1,858	3.2%	6,384	10.8%	59,086
Totals	101,432	50.4%	93,969	46.7%	5,688	2.8%	7,463	3.7%	201,089

== Notes ==
Partisan clients
