= Rhode Island's 1st congressional district =

U.S. House district for Rhode Island

Coordinates: 41°37′50″N 71°19′43″W

- Interactive map of district boundaries since January 3, 2023
- Representative: Gabe Amo; D–Providence
- Distribution: 96.97% urban; 3.03% rural
- Population (2025): 556,451
- Median household income: $87,933
- Ethnicity: 63.9% White; 18.6% Hispanic; 6.3% Black; 5.7% Two or more races; 3.7% Asian; 1.9% other
- Cook PVI: D+12

Rhode Island's 1st congressional district is a congressional district in the U.S. state of Rhode Island. It includes all of Bristol and Newport counties, along with parts of Providence County, including most of the city of Providence. At 555,745 residents, the district has the lowest population among all U.S. congressional districts.

The district was made vacant in 2023 by the resignation of Democrat David Cicilline, who served from 2011 to 2023. He was succeeded by Democrat Gabe Amo, a former Biden White House aide and the state's first black U.S. representative.

== Composition ==
Bristol County (3)
All 3 municipalities

Newport County (6)

All 6 municipalities

Providence County (10)

Central Falls, Cumberland, East Providence, Lincoln, North Providence, North Smithfield, Pawtucket, Providence (part; also 2nd), Smithfield, Woonsocket

=== Voter registration ===
Voter registration and party enrollment as of November 1, 2012
Party	Active voters	Inactive voters	Total voters	Percentage
Democratic	156,784	11,392	168,176	40.39%
Republican	71,932	3,348	75,280	18.08%
Unaffiliated	161,327	11,299	172,626	41.46%
Minor parties	301	29	330	0.07%
Total	390,334	26,068	416,412	100%

== Recent election results from statewide races ==
Year	Office	Results
2008	President	Obama 66% - 32%
2012	President	Obama 67% - 33%
2014	Governor	Raimondo 45% - 31%
2016	President	Clinton 59% - 34%
2018	Senate	Whitehouse 66% - 34%
2018	Governor	Raimondo 59% - 31%
2018	Lt. Governor	McKee 66% - 25%
2018	Secretary of State	Gorbea 71% - 28%
2018	General Treasurer	Magaziner 69% - 31%
2020	President	Biden 63% - 35%
2020	Senate	Reed 70% - 29%
2022	Governor	McKee 62% - 35%
2022	Lt. Governor	Matos 56% - 38%
2022	Secretary of State	Amore 64% - 36%
2022	Attorney General	Neronha 66% - 34%
2022	General Treasurer	Diossa 59% - 41%
2024	President	Harris 60% - 38%
2024	Senate	Whitehouse 64% - 36%

== List of members representing the district ==
Representative	Party	Years	Cong ress	Electoral history	District location
District established March 4, 1843
Henry Y. Cranston (Newport)	Law and Order	March 4, 1843 – March 3, 1845	28th 29th	Elected in 1843. Re-elected in 1845. Retired.	1843–1863 [data missing]
Henry Y. Cranston (Newport)	Whig	March 4, 1845 – March 3, 1847	28th 29th	Elected in 1843. Re-elected in 1845. Retired.	1843–1863 [data missing]
Robert B. Cranston (Newport)	Whig	March 4, 1847 – March 3, 1849	30th	Elected in 1847. Retired.	1843–1863 [data missing]
George Gordon King (Newport)	Whig	March 4, 1849 – March 3, 1853	31st 32nd	Elected in 1849. Re-elected in 1851. Lost re-election.	1843–1863 [data missing]
Thomas Davis (Providence)	Democratic	March 4, 1853 – March 3, 1855	33rd	Elected in 1853. Lost re-election.	1843–1863 [data missing]
Nathan B. Durfee (Tiverton)	American	March 4, 1855 – March 3, 1857	34th 35th	Elected in 1855. Re-elected in 1857. Retired.	1843–1863 [data missing]
Nathan B. Durfee (Tiverton)	Republican	March 4, 1857 – March 3, 1859	34th 35th	Elected in 1855. Re-elected in 1857. Retired.	1843–1863 [data missing]
Christopher Robinson (Woonsocket)	Republican	March 4, 1859 – March 3, 1861	36th	Elected in 1859. Lost re-election.	1843–1863 [data missing]
William Paine Sheffield (Newport)	Constitutional Union	March 4, 1861 – March 3, 1863	37th	Elected in 1861. Retired.	1843–1863 [data missing]
Thomas Jenckes (Providence)	Republican	March 4, 1863 – March 3, 1871	38th 39th 40th 41st	Elected in 1863. Re-elected in 1865. Re-elected in 1867. Re-elected in 1868. Lost re-election.	1863–1875 [data missing]
Benjamin T. Eames (Providence)	Republican	March 4, 1871 – March 3, 1879	42nd 43rd 44th 45th	Elected in 1870. Re-elected in 1872. Re-elected in 1874. Re-elected in 1876. Retired.	1863–1875 [data missing]
Benjamin T. Eames (Providence)	Republican	March 4, 1871 – March 3, 1879	42nd 43rd 44th 45th	Elected in 1870. Re-elected in 1872. Re-elected in 1874. Re-elected in 1876. Retired.	1875–1883 [data missing]
Nelson W. Aldrich (Providence)	Republican	March 4, 1879 – October 4, 1881	46th	Elected in 1878. Re-elected in 1880. Resigned when elected U.S. senator.	1875–1883 [data missing]
Vacant		October 4, 1881 – December 5, 1881	46th		1875–1883 [data missing]
Henry J. Spooner (Providence)	Republican	December 5, 1881 – March 3, 1891	46th 47th 48th 49th 50th 51st	Elected to finish Aldrich's term. Re-elected in 1882. Re-elected in 1884. Re-elected in 1886. Re-elected in 1888. Lost re-election.	1875–1883 [data missing]
Henry J. Spooner (Providence)	Republican	December 5, 1881 – March 3, 1891	46th 47th 48th 49th 50th 51st	Elected to finish Aldrich's term. Re-elected in 1882. Re-elected in 1884. Re-elected in 1886. Re-elected in 1888. Lost re-election.	1883–1913 [data missing]
Oscar Lapham (Providence)	Democratic	March 4, 1891 – March 3, 1895	52nd 53rd	Elected in 1890. Re-elected in 1892. Lost re-election.	1883–1913 [data missing]
Melville Bull (Middletown)	Republican	March 4, 1895 – March 3, 1903	54th 55th 56th 57th	Elected in 1894. Re-elected in 1896. Re-elected in 1898. Re-elected in 1900. Lost re-election.	1883–1913 [data missing]
Daniel L.D. Granger (Providence)	Democratic	March 4, 1903 – February 14, 1909	58th 59th 60th	Elected in 1902. Re-elected in 1904. Re-elected in 1906. Lost re-election and died.	1883–1913 [data missing]
Vacant		February 14, 1909 – March 3, 1909	60th		1883–1913 [data missing]
William Paine Sheffield (Newport)	Republican	March 4, 1909 – March 3, 1911	61st	Elected in 1908. Lost re-election.	1883–1913 [data missing]
George F. O'Shaunessy (Providence)	Democratic	March 4, 1911 – March 3, 1919	62nd 63rd 64th 65th	Elected in 1910. Re-elected in 1912. Re-elected in 1914. Re-elected in 1916. Lost re-election.	1883–1913 [data missing]
George F. O'Shaunessy (Providence)	Democratic	March 4, 1911 – March 3, 1919	62nd 63rd 64th 65th	Elected in 1910. Re-elected in 1912. Re-elected in 1914. Re-elected in 1916. Lost re-election.	1913–1931 [data missing]
Clark Burdick (Newport)	Republican	March 4, 1919 – March 3, 1933	66th 67th 68th 69th 70th 71st 72nd	Elected in 1918. Re-elected in 1920. Re-elected in 1922. Re-elected in 1924. Re-elected in 1926. Re-elected in 1928. Re-elected in 1930. Lost re-election.	1913–1931 [data missing]
Clark Burdick (Newport)	Republican	March 4, 1919 – March 3, 1933	66th 67th 68th 69th 70th 71st 72nd	Elected in 1918. Re-elected in 1920. Re-elected in 1922. Re-elected in 1924. Re-elected in 1926. Re-elected in 1928. Re-elected in 1930. Lost re-election.	1931–1933 [data missing]
Francis Condon (Central Falls)	Democratic	March 4, 1933 – January 10, 1935	73rd	Redistricted from the 3rd district and re-elected in 1932. Re-elected in 1934. Resigned to join the Rhode Island Supreme Court.	1933–1965 [data missing]
Vacant		January 10, 1935 – August 6, 1935	73rd 74th		1933–1965 [data missing]
Charles Risk (Saylesville)	Republican	August 6, 1935 – January 3, 1937	74th	Elected to finish Condon's term. Lost re-election.	1933–1965 [data missing]
Aime Forand (Central Falls)	Democratic	January 3, 1937 – January 3, 1939	75th	Elected in 1936. Lost re-election.	1933–1965 [data missing]
Charles Risk (Saylesville)	Republican	January 3, 1939 – January 3, 1941	76th	Elected in 1938. Lost re-election.	1933–1965 [data missing]
Aime Forand (Cumberland)	Democratic	January 3, 1941 – January 3, 1961	77th 78th 79th 80th 81st 82nd 83rd 84th 85th 86th	Elected in 1940. Re-elected in 1942. Re-elected in 1944. Re-elected in 1946. Re-elected in 1948. Re-elected in 1950. Re-elected in 1952. Re-elected in 1954. Re-elected in 1956. Re-elected in 1958. Retired.	1933–1965 [data missing]
Fernand St. Germain (Woonsocket)	Democratic	January 3, 1961 – January 3, 1989	87th 88th 89th 90th 91st 92nd 93rd 94th 95th 96th 97th 98th 99th 100th	Elected in 1960. Re-elected in 1962. Re-elected in 1964. Re-elected in 1966. Re-elected in 1968. Re-elected in 1970. Re-elected in 1972. Re-elected in 1974. Re-elected in 1976. Re-elected in 1978. Re-elected in 1980. Re-elected in 1982. Re-elected in 1984. Re-elected in 1986. Lost re-election.	1933–1965 [data missing]
Fernand St. Germain (Woonsocket)	Democratic	January 3, 1961 – January 3, 1989	87th 88th 89th 90th 91st 92nd 93rd 94th 95th 96th 97th 98th 99th 100th	Elected in 1960. Re-elected in 1962. Re-elected in 1964. Re-elected in 1966. Re-elected in 1968. Re-elected in 1970. Re-elected in 1972. Re-elected in 1974. Re-elected in 1976. Re-elected in 1978. Re-elected in 1980. Re-elected in 1982. Re-elected in 1984. Re-elected in 1986. Lost re-election.	1965–1973 [data missing]
Fernand St. Germain (Woonsocket)	Democratic	January 3, 1961 – January 3, 1989	87th 88th 89th 90th 91st 92nd 93rd 94th 95th 96th 97th 98th 99th 100th	Elected in 1960. Re-elected in 1962. Re-elected in 1964. Re-elected in 1966. Re-elected in 1968. Re-elected in 1970. Re-elected in 1972. Re-elected in 1974. Re-elected in 1976. Re-elected in 1978. Re-elected in 1980. Re-elected in 1982. Re-elected in 1984. Re-elected in 1986. Lost re-election.	1973–1983 [data missing]
Fernand St. Germain (Woonsocket)	Democratic	January 3, 1961 – January 3, 1989	87th 88th 89th 90th 91st 92nd 93rd 94th 95th 96th 97th 98th 99th 100th	Elected in 1960. Re-elected in 1962. Re-elected in 1964. Re-elected in 1966. Re-elected in 1968. Re-elected in 1970. Re-elected in 1972. Re-elected in 1974. Re-elected in 1976. Re-elected in 1978. Re-elected in 1980. Re-elected in 1982. Re-elected in 1984. Re-elected in 1986. Lost re-election.	1983–1993; Bristol and Newport; part of Providence
Ronald Machtley (Portsmouth)	Republican	January 3, 1989 – January 3, 1995	101st 102nd 103rd	Elected in 1988. Re-elected in 1990. Re-elected in 1992. Retired to run for Governor of Rhode Island.	1983–1993; Bristol and Newport; part of Providence
Ronald Machtley (Portsmouth)	Republican	January 3, 1989 – January 3, 1995	101st 102nd 103rd	Elected in 1988. Re-elected in 1990. Re-elected in 1992. Retired to run for Governor of Rhode Island.	1993–2003; Bristol and Newport; part of Providence
Patrick J. Kennedy (Portsmouth)	Democratic	January 3, 1995 – January 3, 2011	104th 105th 106th 107th 108th 109th 110th 111th	Elected in 1994. Re-elected in 1996. Re-elected in 1998. Re-elected in 2000. Re-elected in 2002. Re-elected in 2004. Re-elected in 2006. Re-elected in 2008. Retired.	1993–2003; Bristol and Newport; part of Providence
Patrick J. Kennedy (Portsmouth)	Democratic	January 3, 1995 – January 3, 2011	104th 105th 106th 107th 108th 109th 110th 111th	Elected in 1994. Re-elected in 1996. Re-elected in 1998. Re-elected in 2000. Re-elected in 2002. Re-elected in 2004. Re-elected in 2006. Re-elected in 2008. Retired.	2003–2013 Bristol and Newport; part of Providence
David Cicilline (Providence)	Democratic	January 3, 2011 – May 31, 2023	112th 113th 114th 115th 116th 117th 118th	Elected in 2010. Re-elected in 2012. Re-elected in 2014. Re-elected in 2016. Re-elected in 2018. Re-elected in 2020. Re-elected in 2022. Resigned.	2003–2013 Bristol and Newport; part of Providence
David Cicilline (Providence)	Democratic	January 3, 2011 – May 31, 2023	112th 113th 114th 115th 116th 117th 118th	Elected in 2010. Re-elected in 2012. Re-elected in 2014. Re-elected in 2016. Re-elected in 2018. Re-elected in 2020. Re-elected in 2022. Resigned.	2013–2023 Bristol and Newport; part of Providence
David Cicilline (Providence)	Democratic	January 3, 2011 – May 31, 2023	112th 113th 114th 115th 116th 117th 118th	Elected in 2010. Re-elected in 2012. Re-elected in 2014. Re-elected in 2016. Re-elected in 2018. Re-elected in 2020. Re-elected in 2022. Resigned.	2023–present Bristol and Newport; part of Providence
Vacant		May 31, 2023 – November 13, 2023	118th		2023–present Bristol and Newport; part of Providence
Gabe Amo (Providence)	Democratic	November 13, 2023 – present	118th 119th	Elected to finish Cicilline's term. Re-elected in 2024. Re-elected in 2026.	2023–present Bristol and Newport; part of Providence

== Election history ==
=== 2006 ===
2006 Rhode Island's 1st congressional district election
Party	Candidate	Votes	%	±%
Democratic	Patrick Kennedy (incumbent)	124,634	69.20	+5.14
Republican	Jonathan Scott	41,836	23.23	−12.57
Independent	Kenneth Capalbo	13,634	7.57	
Democratic hold		Swing		
Turnout		180,104		

=== 2008 ===
2008 Rhode Island's 1st congressional district election
Party	Candidate	Votes	%	±%
Democratic	Patrick Kennedy (incumbent)	145,254	68.52	−0.68
Republican	Jonathan Scott	51,340	24.22	+0.99
Independent	Kenneth Capalbo	15,108	7.13	−0.44
Independent	Write-in votes	296	0.14	
Democratic hold		Swing		
Turnout		211,998		

=== 2010 ===
2010 Rhode Island's 1st congressional district election
Party	Candidate	Votes	%	±%
Democratic	David Cicilline	81,269	50.54	−17.98
Republican	John Loughlin	71,542	44.49	+20.27
Independent	Kenneth Capalbo	6,424	3.99	−3.14
Independent	Gregory Raposa	1,334	1.13	0.83
Independent	Write-in votes	245	0.15	+0.01
Democratic hold		Swing		
Turnout		160,814		

=== 2012 ===
2012 Rhode Island's 1st congressional district election
Party	Candidate	Votes	%	±%
Democratic	David Cicilline (incumbent)	108,612	52.95	+2.41
Republican	Brendan Doherty	83,737	40.82	−3.67
Independent	David Vogel	12,504	6.10	+2.11
Independent	Write-in votes	262	0.13	−0.02
Democratic hold		Swing		
Turnout		205,115		

=== 2014 ===
2014 Rhode Island's 1st congressional district election
Party	Candidate	Votes	%
Democratic	David Cicilline (incumbent)	87,060	59.5
Republican	Cormick Lynch	58,877	40.2
n/a	Write-ins	416	0.3
Total votes		146,353	100.0
Democratic hold			

=== 2016 ===
2016 Rhode Island's 1st congressional district election
Party	Candidate	Votes	%
Democratic	David Cicilline (incumbent)	130,540	64.5
Republican	Harold Russell Taub	71,023	35.1
n/a	Write-ins	814	0.4
Total votes		202,371	100.0
Democratic hold			

=== 2018 ===
2018 Rhode Island's 1st congressional district election
Party	Candidate	Votes	%
Democratic	David Cicilline (incumbent)	116,099	66.7
Republican	Patrick Donovan	57,567	33.1
n/a	Write-ins	417	0.2
Total votes		174,083	100.0
Democratic hold			

=== 2020 ===
2020 Rhode Island's 1st congressional district election
Party	Candidate	Votes	%
Democratic	David Cicilline (incumbent)	158,550	70.8
Independent	Jeffrey Lemire	35,457	15.8
Independent	Frederick Wysocki	28,300	12.6
Write-in		1,553	0.7
Total votes		223,860	100.0
Democratic hold			

=== 2022 ===
2022 Rhode Island's 1st congressional district election
Party	Candidate	Votes	%
Democratic	David Cicilline (incumbent)	99,802	64.0
Republican	Allen Waters	55,909	35.8
Write-in		361	0.2
Total votes		155,711	100.0
Democratic hold			

=== 2023 ===
2023 Rhode Island's 1st congressional district special election
Party	Candidate	Votes	%
Democratic	Gabe Amo	43,282	64.7
Republican	Gerry Leonard	23,391	34.9
Write-in		193	0.2
Total votes		66,866	100.0
Democratic hold			

=== 2024 ===
2024 Rhode Island's 1st congressional district election
Party	Candidate	Votes	%
Democratic	Gabe Amo (incumbent)	139,352	63.0
Republican	Allen Waters	70,742	31.9
Independent	CD Reynolds	10,463	4.7
Write-in		561	0.2
Total votes		221,118	100.0
Democratic hold			

== Historical district boundaries ==
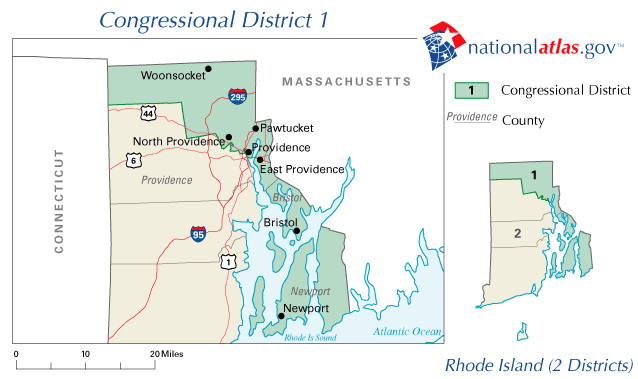
2003 - 2013

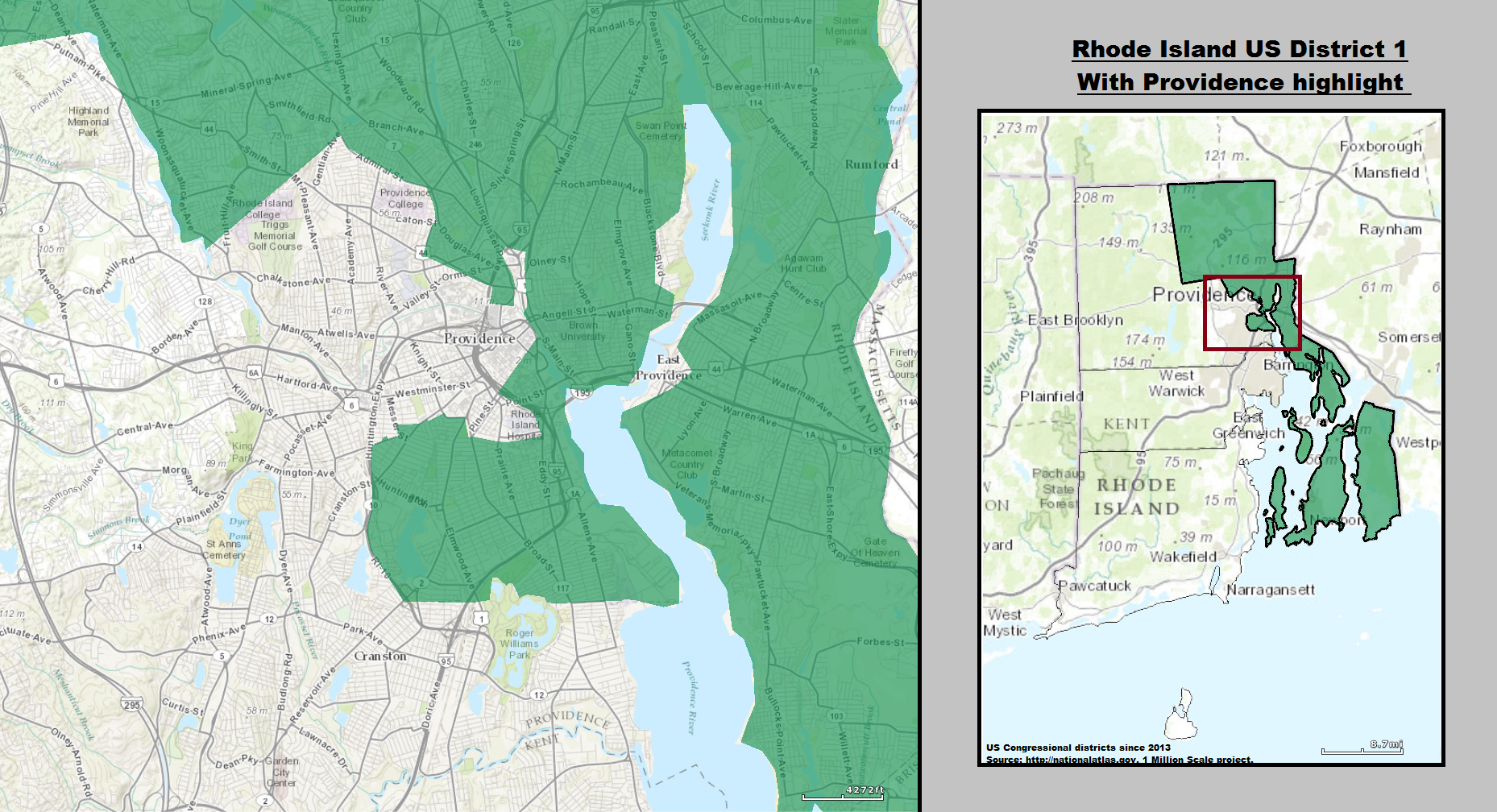
2013 - 2023

== See also ==
- Rhode Island's congressional districts
- List of United States congressional districts
