= 2018 United States House of Representatives elections in Rhode Island =

- November 6, 2018

Both Rhode Island seats to the United States House of Representatives
	Majority party	Minority party
Party	Democratic	Republican
Last election	2	0
Seats won	2	0
Seat change	Steady	Steady
Popular vote	242,575	129,838
Percentage	64.98%	34.78%
Swing	▲3.88%	▲2.03%

Democratic
50–60%
60–70%
70–80%
80–90%
Republican
50–60%

The 2018 United States House of Representatives elections in Rhode Island were held on November 6, 2018, to elect the two U.S. representatives from the state of Rhode Island, one from each of the state's two congressional districts. The election coincided with the 2018 U.S. mid-term elections, as well as other elections to the House of Representatives, elections to the United States Senate and various state and local elections. The primaries took place on September 12.

Following the 2018 elections, the Democratic Party retained control of both House seats, and also retained control of the entirety of Rhode Island's Congressional (House and Senate) delegation.

== Overview ==
Results of the 2018 United States House of Representatives elections in Rhode Island by district:

District	Democratic		Republican		Others		Total		Result
District	Votes	%	Votes	%	Votes	%	Votes	%	Result
District 1	116,099	66.69%	57,567	33.07%	417	0.24%	174,083	100.0%	Democratic hold
District 2	126,476	63.49%	72,271	36.28%	450	0.23%	199,197	100.0%	Democratic hold
Total	242,575	64.99%	129,838	34.78%	867	0.23%	373,280	100.0%	

== District 1 ==
2018 Rhode Island's 1st congressional district election
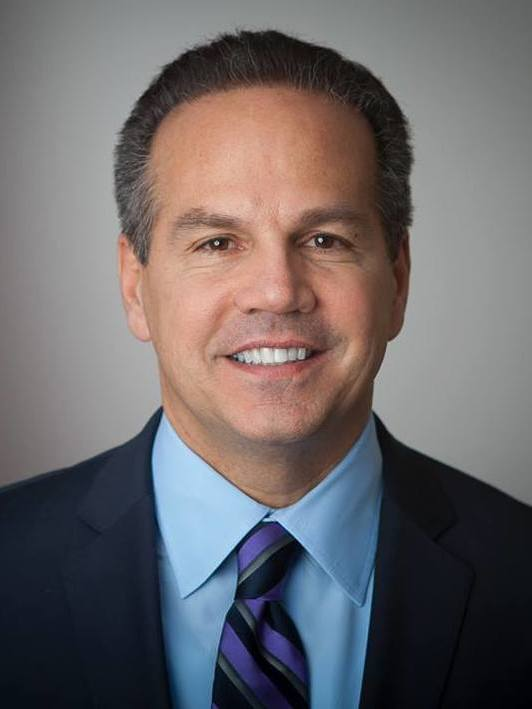

Nominee	David Cicilline	Patrick Donovan
Party	Democratic	Republican
Popular vote	116,099	57,567
Percentage	66.7%	33.1%
- County results Cicilline: 60–70%
U.S. Representative before election
David Cicilline
Democratic
Elected U.S. Representative
David Cicilline
Democratic

The 1st district includes the capital, Providence and the surrounding Narragansett Bay area. This district had a PVI of D+14. Democrat David Cicilline had represented the district since 2010.

=== Democratic primary ===
Declared

- David Cicilline, incumbent
- Chris Young, electrical engineer

==== Primary results ====
Democratic primary results
Party	Candidate	Votes	%
Democratic	David Cicilline (incumbent)	44,551	77.6
Democratic	Chris Young	12,852	22.4
Total votes		57,403	100.0

=== Republican primary ===
Declared

- Patrick Donovan, Newport, Rhode Island resident
- Frederick Wysocki, financial advisor

==== Primary results ====
Republican primary results
Party	Candidate	Votes	%
Republican	Patrick Donovan	7,238	78.4
Republican	Frederick Wysocki	1,990	21.6
Total votes		9,228	100.0

=== General election ===
==== Predictions ====
Source	Ranking	As of
The Cook Political Report	Safe D	November 5, 2018
Inside Elections	Safe D	November 5, 2018
Sabato's Crystal Ball	Safe D	November 5, 2018
RCP	Safe D	November 5, 2018
Daily Kos	Safe D	November 5, 2018
538	Safe D	November 7, 2018
CNN	Safe D	October 31, 2018
Politico	Safe D	November 2, 2018

==== Results ====
Rhode Island's 1st congressional district, 2018
Party	Candidate	Votes	%
Democratic	David Cicilline (incumbent)	116,099	66.7
Republican	Patrick Donovan	57,567	33.1
n/a	Write-ins	417	0.2
Total votes		174,083	100.0
Democratic hold			

== District 2 ==
2018 Rhode Island's 2nd congressional district election
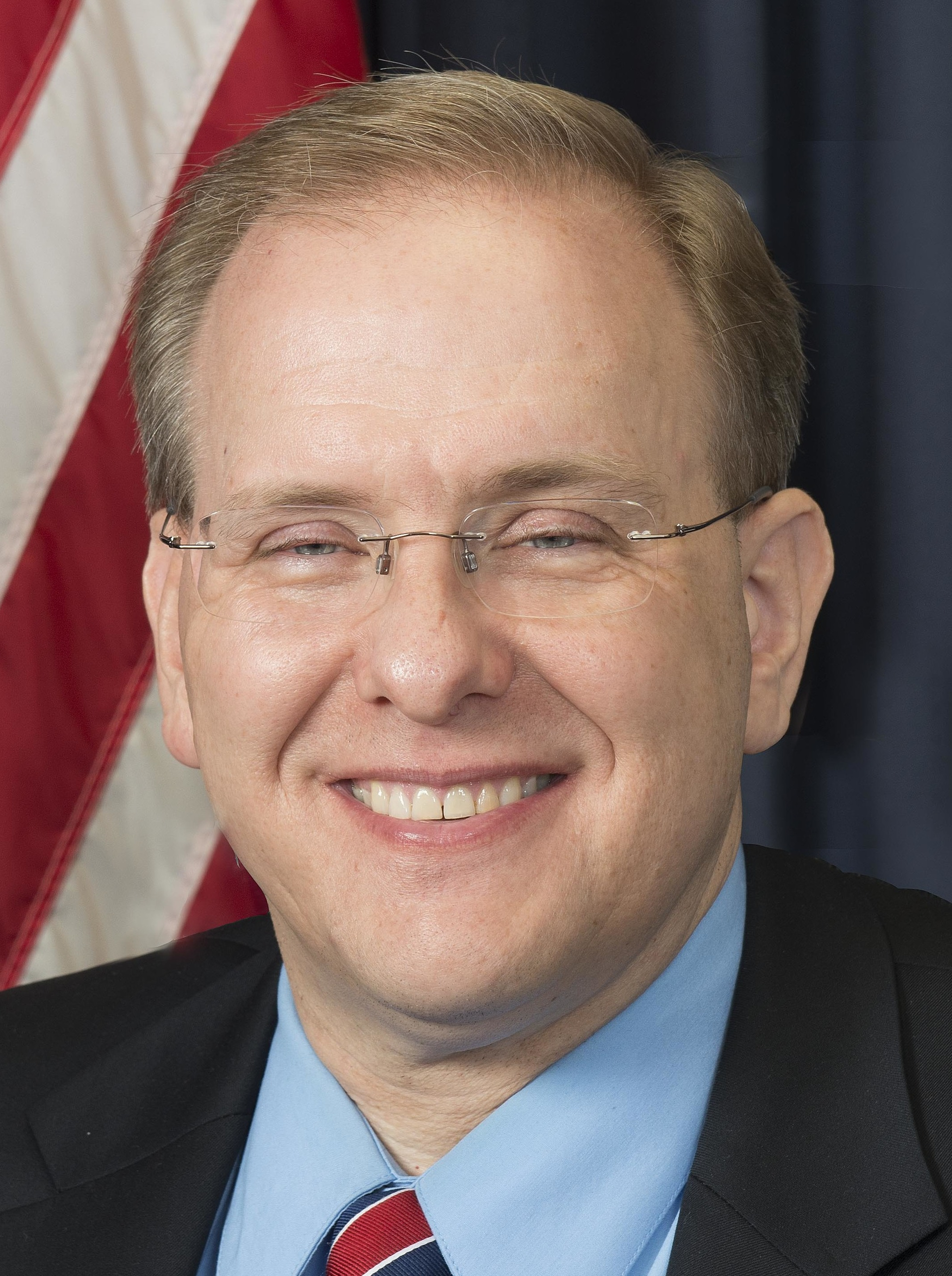

Nominee	James Langevin	Salvatore Caiozzo
Party	Democratic	Republican
Popular vote	126,476	72,271
Percentage	63.5%	36.3%
- County results Langevin: 60–70%
U.S. Representative before election
James Langevin
Democratic
Elected U.S. Representative
James Langevin
Democratic

The 2nd district is located in western and southern Rhode Island, including Coventry, Cranston, and Warwick. The district had a PVI of D+6. Democrat James Langevin had represented this district since 2001.

=== Democratic primary ===
Declared

- James Langevin, incumbent

==== Primary results ====
Democratic primary results
Party	Candidate	Votes	%
Democratic	James Langevin (incumbent)	44,129	100.0
Total votes		44,129	100.0

=== Republican primary ===
Declared

- Sal Caiozzo, businessman

==== Primary results ====
Republican primary results
Party	Candidate	Votes	%
Republican	Salvatore G. Caiozzo	15,229	100.0
Total votes		15,229	100.0

=== General election ===
==== Predictions ====
Source	Ranking	As of
The Cook Political Report	Safe D	November 5, 2018
Inside Elections	Safe D	November 5, 2018
Sabato's Crystal Ball	Safe D	November 5, 2018
RCP	Safe D	November 5, 2018
Daily Kos	Safe D	November 5, 2018
538	Safe D	November 7, 2018
CNN	Safe D	October 31, 2018
Politico	Safe D	November 4, 2018

==== Results ====
Rhode Island's 2nd congressional district, 2018
Party	Candidate	Votes	%
Democratic	James Langevin (incumbent)	126,476	63.5
Republican	Sal Caiozzo	72,271	36.3
n/a	Write-ins	450	0.2
Total votes		199,197	100.0
Democratic hold			

== See also ==
- 2018 United States House of Representatives elections
- 2018 United States elections
- 2018 United States Senate election in Rhode Island
- 2018 Rhode Island gubernatorial election
