= Robert Lancia =

American politician

Bob Lancia

Member of the Rhode Island House of Representatives from the 16th district
- In office January 6, 2015 – December 31, 2018
- Preceded by: Peter Palumbo
- Succeeded by: Christopher Millea

Personal details
- Born: Robert Lancia; November 24, 1953 (age 72) Cranston, Rhode Island
- Party: Republican
- Spouse: Maryann Mulcahy
- Children: 3
- Education: Rhode Island College; Andover Newton Theological School

Robert "Bob" Lancia (born November 24, 1953) is an American politician, former educator, and former U.S. Navy chaplain. From 2015 to 2018, he served as a member of the Rhode Island House of Representatives, serving the 16th district, which included portions of Providence County. A self-described "libertarian Republican", Lancia announced in 2022 that he would run for the United States House of Representatives in Rhode Island's 2nd congressional district.

== Early life and education ==
Robert Lancia was born on November 24, 1953, in Cranston, Rhode Island. He graduated from Rhode Island College and Andover Newton Theological School.

== Career ==
Lancia joined the United States Navy as a chaplain, being deployed to Bosnia and Herzegovina and the Caribbean, before eventually becoming the head chaplain of Camp Lejeune in North Carolina. He retired from the military in 2004.

Lancia is a former elementary school teacher, and holds a Master's of Education.

In 2014, Lancia was elected to serve District 16 in the Rhode Island House of Representatives. He was reelected in 2016, but was defeated in 2018 by Christopher Millea. Lancia ran against incumbent Democrat Jim Langevin in 2020 and lost the election.

In March 2021, Lancia announced on WPRO radio that he was running for Congress once again in 2022.

== Political positions ==
=== Abortion ===
When asked about abortion, Lancia said "I have been asked many times on Roe v. Wade and I've said I consider that to be settled law, but when we went to this 40-week bill, they lost me."

=== Conspiracy theories ===
In the run-up to his 2020 campaign, the Twitter account for Lancia's campaign retweeted two tweets promoting the QAnon conspiracy theory. When asked in an interview with WNPN, Lancia denied having any knowledge of QAnon and suggested that the staffer running the account retweeted the tweets because "probably it was attached to something else - maybe something to do with the president".

=== Education ===
Lancia is an advocate of providing school choice to students "who can't get their needs met in a government run school."

=== Gun rights ===
When asked about the 2nd Amendment, Lancia said "I am a Second Amendment guy. But I am also a chaplain and have never shot a gun in my life."

=== Healthcare ===
Lancia stated that he thought minority communities have been affected the most by the COVID-19 pandemic, and that those communities should always have proper medical facilities and personnel.

Lancia called for policies and programs to encourage physicians to develop their own business models, particularly in the nation's inner cities.

=== Recreation ===
Lancia has proposed that there should be no fees to enter state beaches.

=== Term limits ===
Lancia advocates for term limits at the federal level.

== Personal life ==
Lancia is married to Maryann Mulcahy, and they have three children. The couple live in Cranston.

Lancia has founded numerous midnight basketball leagues, and also founded a basketball clinic.
