= 2014 United States House of Representatives elections in Rhode Island =

- November 4, 2014

Both Rhode Island seats to the United States House of Representatives
	Majority party	Minority party
Party	Democratic	Republican
Last election	2	0
Seats won	2	0
Seat change	Steady	Steady
Popular vote	192,776	122,721
Percentage	60.96%	38.80%
Swing	▲6.57%	▲0.95%

Democratic
50–60%
60–70%
70–80%
80–90%
Republican
40–50%
50–60%

The 2014 United States House of Representatives elections in Rhode Island were held on November 4, 2014, to elect the two U.S. representatives from the state of Rhode Island, apportioned according to the 2010 United States census. The elections coincided with the elections of other federal and state offices, including an election to the U.S. Senate and the election for governor.

== Overview ==
Results of the 2014 United States House of Representatives elections in Rhode Island by district:

District	Democratic		Republican		Others		Total		Result
District	Votes	%	Votes	%	Votes	%	Votes	%	Result
District 1	87,060	59.49%	58,877	40.23%	416	0.28%	146,353	100.0%	Democratic hold
District 2	105,716	62.22%	63,844	37.58%	344	0.20%	169,904	100.0%	Democratic hold
Total	192,776	60.96%	122,721	38.80%	760	0.24%	316,257	100.0%	

== District 1 ==
2014 Rhode Island's 1st congressional district election
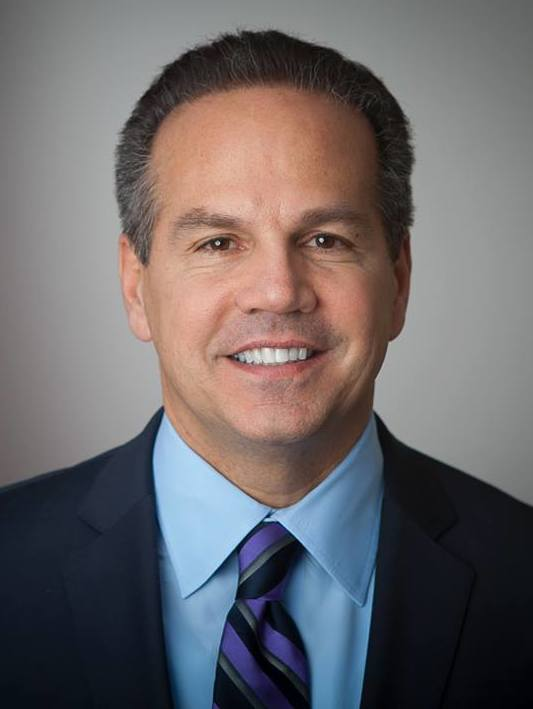

Nominee	David Cicilline	Cormick Lynch
Party	Democratic	Republican
Popular vote	87,060	58,877
Percentage	59.5%	40.2%
- Municipality results Cicilline: 50–60% 60–70% 70–80% 80–90% Lynch: 50–60%
U.S. Representative before election
David Cicilline
Democratic
Elected U.S. Representative
David Cicilline
Democratic

The 1st district is located in eastern Rhode Island and includes all of Bristol and Newport counties, along with parts of Providence County, including most of the city of Providence. Incumbent Democrat David Cicilline, who had represented the district since 2011, ran for re-election. He was re-elected with 53% of the vote in 2012 and the district had a PVI of D+15.

=== Democratic primary ===
==== Candidates ====
===== Nominee =====
- David Cicilline, incumbent U.S. Representative

===== Eliminated in primary =====
- Matthew Fecteau, former United States Army Captain

==== Results ====
Democratic primary results
Party	Candidate	Votes	%
Democratic	David Cicilline (incumbent)	38,186	63.0
Democratic	Matthew Fecteau	22,447	37.0
Total votes		60,633	100.0

=== Republican primary ===
==== Candidates ====
===== Nominee =====
- Cormick Lynch, former United States Marine and former JPMorgan Chase employee

===== Eliminated in primary =====
- Stanford Tran, Brown University medical student

===== Declined =====
- John J. Loughlin Jr., former state representative and nominee for this seat in 2010

==== Results ====
Republican primary results
Party	Candidate	Votes	%
Republican	Cormick Lynch	6,527	72.4
Republican	Stanford Tran	2,483	27.6
Total votes		9,010	100.0

=== General election ===
Jonathan Maciel also filed to run as an Independent.

==== Predictions ====
Source	Ranking	As of
The Cook Political Report	Safe D	November 3, 2014
Rothenberg	Safe D	October 24, 2014
Sabato's Crystal Ball	Safe D	October 30, 2014
RCP	Safe D	November 2, 2014
Daily Kos Elections	Safe D	November 4, 2014

==== Results ====
Rhode Island's 1st congressional district, 2014
Party	Candidate	Votes	%
Democratic	David Cicilline (incumbent)	87,060	59.5
Republican	Cormick Lynch	58,877	40.2
n/a	Write-ins	416	0.3
Total votes		146,353	100.0
Democratic hold			

== District 2 ==
2014 Rhode Island's 2nd congressional district election
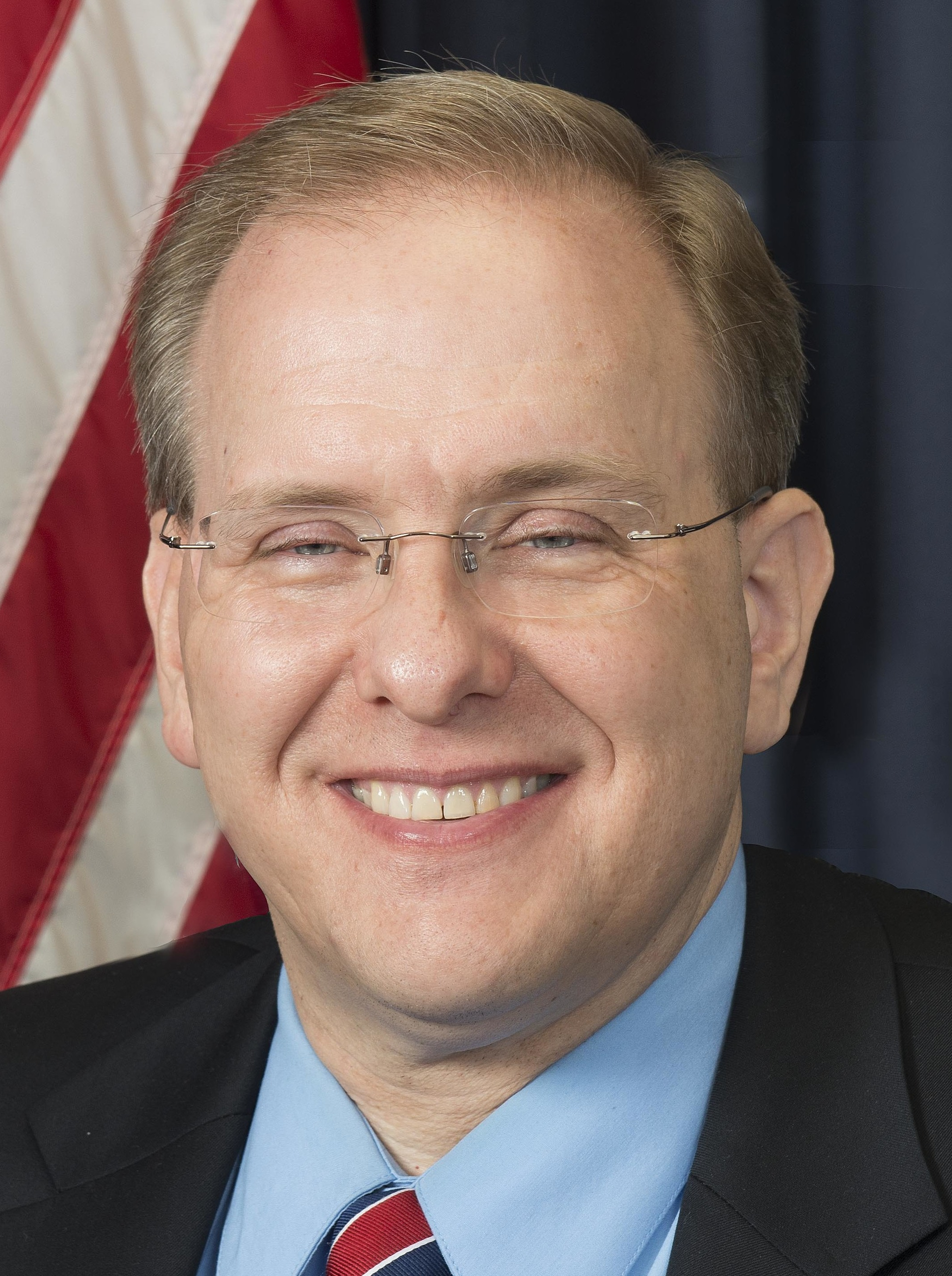

Nominee	James Langevin	Rhue Reis
Party	Democratic	Republican
Popular vote	105,716	63,844
Percentage	62.2%	37.6%
- Municipality results Langevin: 50–60% 60–70% 70–80% 80–90% Reis: 40–50% 50–60%
U.S. Representative before election
James Langevin
Democratic
Elected U.S. Representative
James Langevin
Democratic

The 2nd district is located in southern and western Rhode Island and includes all of Kent and Washington counties, along with parts of Providence County, including the city of Cranston and parts of the city of Providence. Incumbent Democrat James Langevin, who had represented the district since 2001, ran for re-election. He was re-elected with 56% of the vote in 2012 and the district had a PVI of D+8.

=== Democratic primary ===
==== Candidates ====
===== Nominee =====
- James Langevin, incumbent U.S. Representative

==== Results ====
Democratic primary results
Party	Candidate	Votes	%
Democratic	James Langevin (incumbent)	44,512	100.0

=== Republican primary ===
Mark Zaccaria, a former chairman of the Rhode Island Republican Party, attempted to convince a dozen Republicans to run, all of whom turned him down. Ultimately, house contractor and casino worker Rhue Reis was the only person to file for the nomination.

==== Candidates ====
===== Nominee =====
- Rhue Reis, house contractor and casino worker

===== Declined =====
- Mark Zaccaria, former Chair of the Rhode Island Republican Party and nominee for this seat in 2008 and 2010

==== Results ====
Republican primary results
Party	Candidate	Votes	%
Republican	Rhue Reis	14,143	100.0

=== General election ===
==== Predictions ====
Source	Ranking	As of
The Cook Political Report	Safe D	November 3, 2014
Rothenberg	Safe D	October 24, 2014
Sabato's Crystal Ball	Safe D	October 30, 2014
RCP	Safe D	November 2, 2014
Daily Kos Elections	Safe D	November 4, 2014

==== Results ====
Rhode Island's 2nd congressional district, 2014
Party	Candidate	Votes	%
Democratic	James Langevin (incumbent)	105,716	62.2
Republican	Rhue Reis	63,844	37.6
n/a	Write-ins	344	0.2
Total votes		169,904	100.0
Democratic hold			
