= Karen MacBeth =

American politician (born 1967)

Member of the Rhode Island House of Representatives from the 52nd district
- In office January 2009 – January 2017
- Preceded by: Richard Singleton
- Succeeded by: Alex Marszalkowski

Personal details
- Born: September 23, 1967 (age 59)
- Party: Republican (2016–present); Democratic (Before 2016)
- Education: Rhode Island College; Providence College

Karen L. MacBeth (born September 23, 1967) is an American Republican politician who was a member of the Rhode Island House of Representatives representing District 52 from January 2009 to January 2017. Initially a Democrat, MacBeth left the party in 2016.

== Education ==
MacBeth earned her BS in special education from Rhode Island College and her MA in administration from Providence College.

== Elections ==
- 2012 – MacBeth was challenged in the September 11, 2012 Democratic Primary, winning with 1,076 votes (59.9%) and was unopposed for the November 6, 2012 General election, winning with 5,593 votes.
- 2010 – MacBeth was challenged in the September 23, 2010 Democratic Primary, winning with 1,458 votes (62.9%) and was unopposed for the November 2, 2010 General election, winning with 5,208 votes.
- 2008 – When District 52 Republican Representative Richard Singleton left the Legislature and left the seat open, MacBeth ran in the three-way September 9, 2008 Democratic Primary, winning with 1,614 votes (55.0%) and won the November 4, 2008 General election with 5,214 votes (63.9%) against Republican nominee Michael Tusoni.
