= Seth Magaziner =

American politician (born 1983)

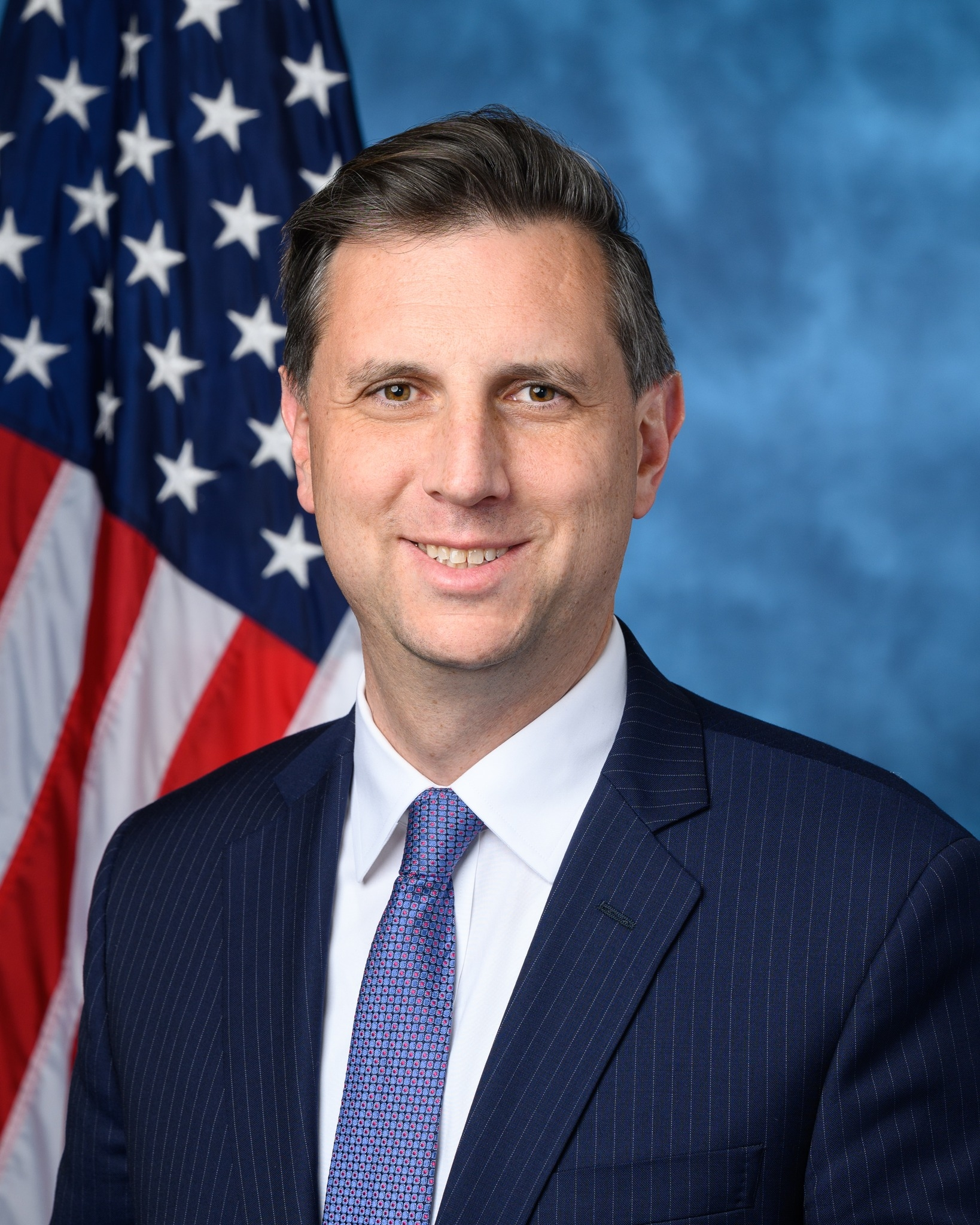
- Official portrait, 2023

Member of the U.S. House of Representatives from Rhode Island's 2nd district
- Incumbent
- Assumed office January 3, 2023
- Preceded by: James Langevin

31st Treasurer of Rhode Island
- In office January 6, 2015 – January 3, 2023
- Governor: Gina Raimondo; Dan McKee
- Preceded by: Gina Raimondo
- Succeeded by: James Diossa

Personal details
- Born: Seth Michael Magaziner; July 22, 1983 (age 43) Bristol, Rhode Island, U.S.
- Party: Democratic
- Spouse: Julia McDowell (m. 2018)
- Children: 2
- Relatives: Ira Magaziner (father)
- Education: Brown University (BA); Yale University (MBA)
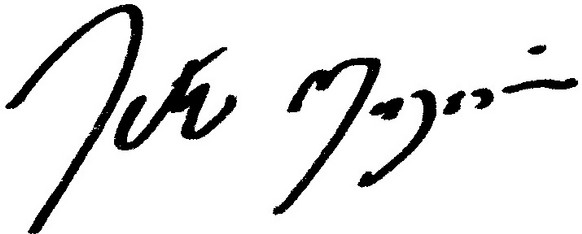
- Signature
- Website: House website Campaign website

Seth Michael Magaziner (/ˈmæɡəziːnər/ mag-ə-ZEE-nər; born July 22, 1983) is an American investment professional and politician serving as the U.S. representative for Rhode Island's 2nd congressional district since 2023. A member of the Democratic Party, he previously served as the 31st general treasurer of Rhode Island from 2015 until 2023. Magaziner won the November 2022 election to succeed retiring representative James Langevin.

== Early life and education ==
Seth Magaziner was born in Bristol, Rhode Island, on July 22, 1983, to Suzanne and Ira Magaziner. Ira is a policy advisor for politicians, governments, and non-governmental organizations. His mother is Catholic and his father is Jewish. Seth is the oldest of three children.

Magaziner graduated from Milton Academy in Milton, Massachusetts, in 2002. He then attended Brown University, where he served as president of the Brown University Democrats, president of the College Democrats of Rhode Island, and as a member of the Brown University Steering Committee on Slavery and Justice. Magaziner graduated from Brown with a Bachelor of Arts in history in 2006. He received a Master of Business Administration from the Yale School of Management in 2010.

== Early career ==
Magaziner worked as a school teacher at Creswell Elementary School in Opelousas, Louisiana, from 2006 to 2008, as a Teach For America member. In 2009, he worked as an associate at Point Judith Capital, a Rhode Island–based venture capital firm.

After graduate school, Magaziner worked at Trillium Asset Management as a vice president. He was active in the successful campaign for same-sex marriage in Rhode Island. He served as a board member of Marriage Equality Rhode Island.

Magaziner serves on the board of directors of Crossroads Rhode Island, a homeless service organization. He previously served on the board of directors of Common Cause Rhode Island.

== General Treasurer of Rhode Island ==
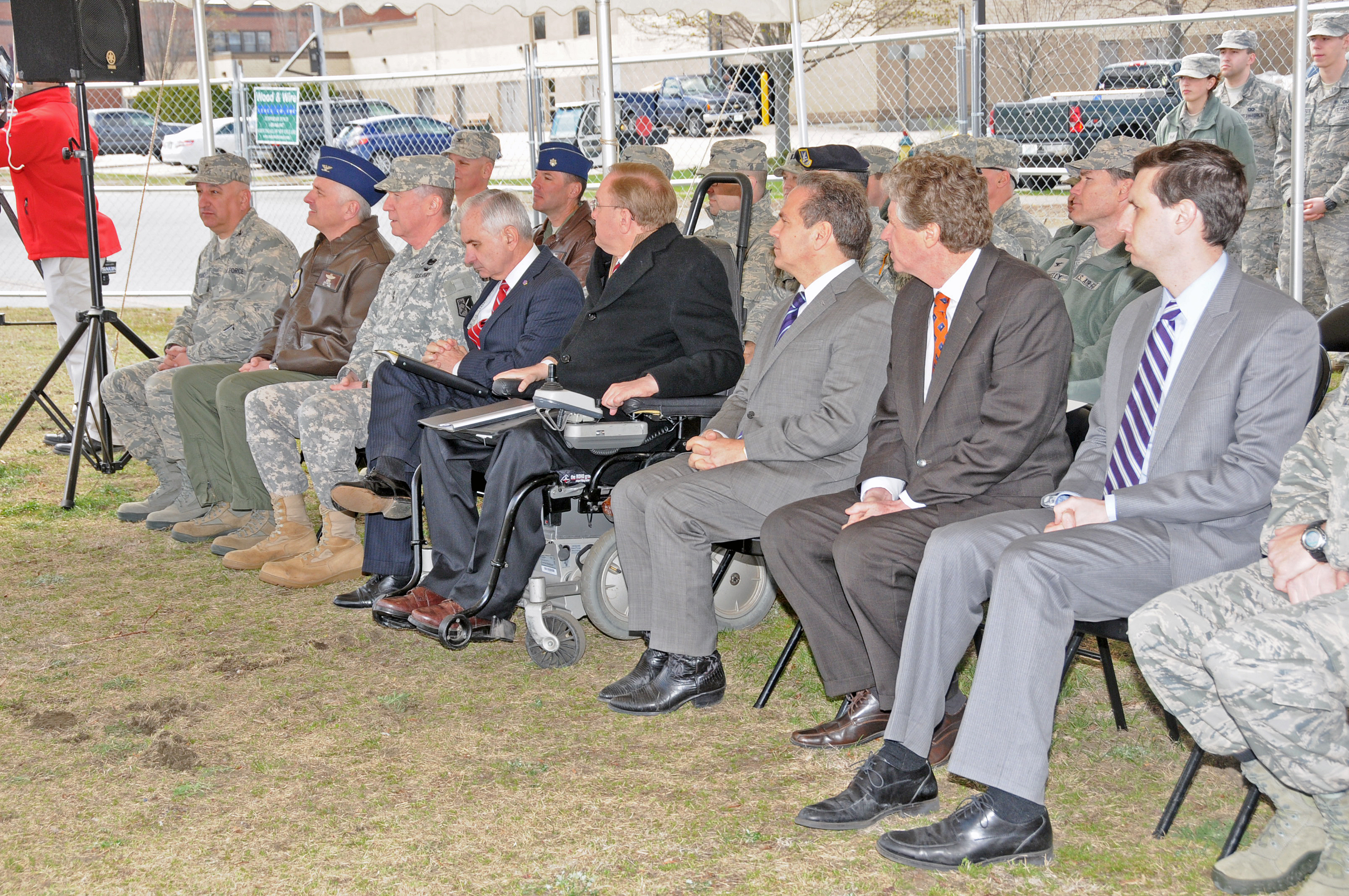
Magaziner (seated on the right in the front row) and other Rhode Island National Guard and political leaders attending a groundbreaking ceremony for the new simulator facility to be located at the 143d Airlift Wing, Quonset Air National Guard Base, North Kingstown, Rhode Island

On October 22, 2013, Magaziner announced his candidacy for Rhode Island general treasurer. He won the Democratic nomination in the September 9 primary election, defeating former treasurer Frank Caprio. Magaziner was elected in the November 2014 general election, defeating Independent candidate Ernest A. Almonte.

In his first months in office, Magaziner developed a plan to establish the Rhode Island Infrastructure Bank (RIIB) to finance green infrastructure projects.

In June 2015, Magaziner launched a transparency initiative for the Employees' Retirement System of Rhode Island (ERSRI). In 2015, the treasurer's office announced it was pursuing two class-action lawsuits against fossil fuel industry companies BP and Plains All American for oil spills that allegedly harmed investors and the environment.

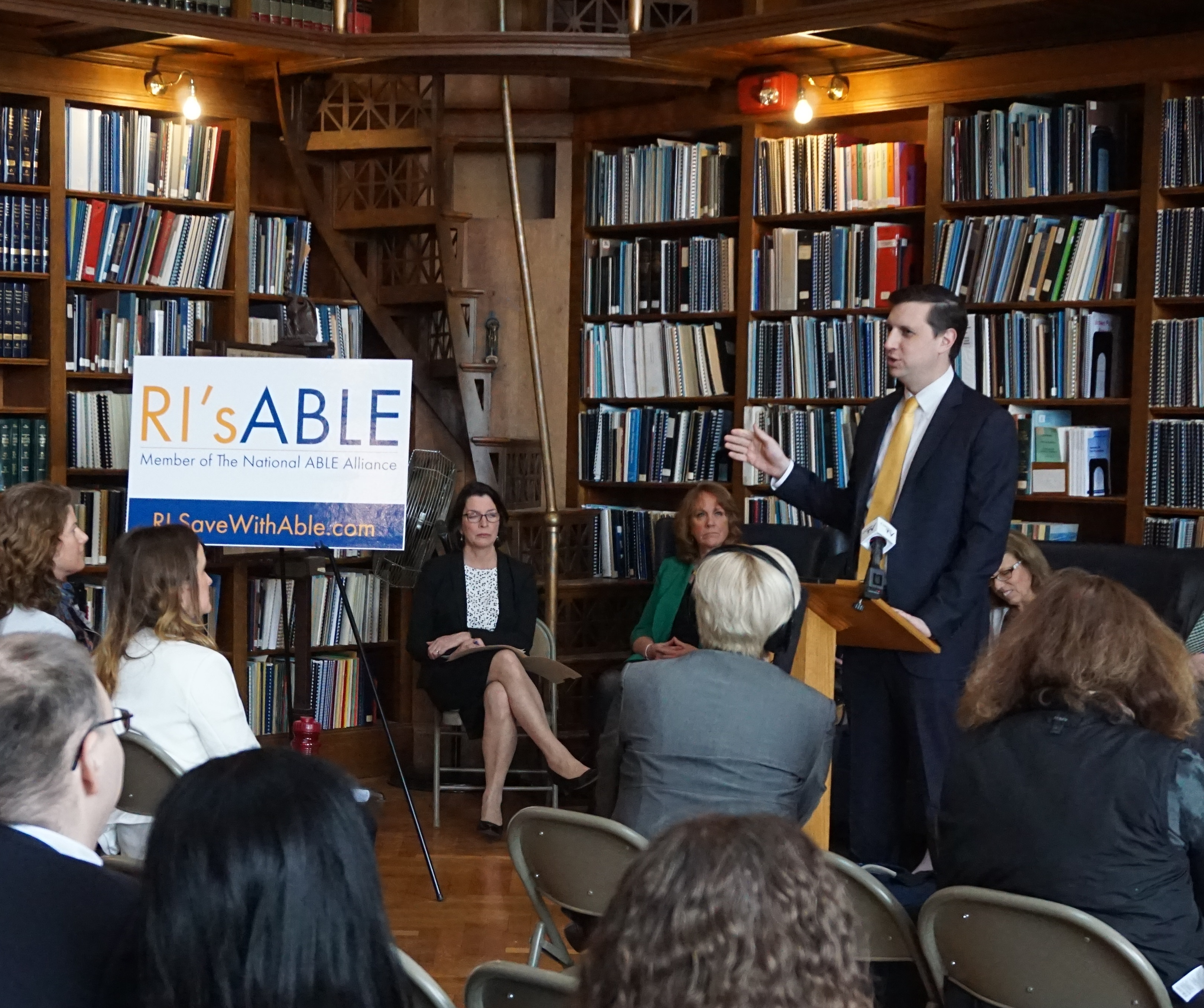
Magaziner at the public launch of Rhode Island's ABLE program in 2017

In February 2016, Magaziner was selected as chair of the Financial Literacy Committee for the National Association of State Treasurers.

== U.S. House of Representatives ==
=== Elections ===
==== 2022 ====
On September 14, 2021, Magaziner announced his candidacy in the 2022 Rhode Island gubernatorial election, focusing on abortion rights, clean energy, reducing gun violence, education, and mandatory coronavirus vaccination for all state and school employees. The incumbent, Dan McKee, had not yet filed for reelection.

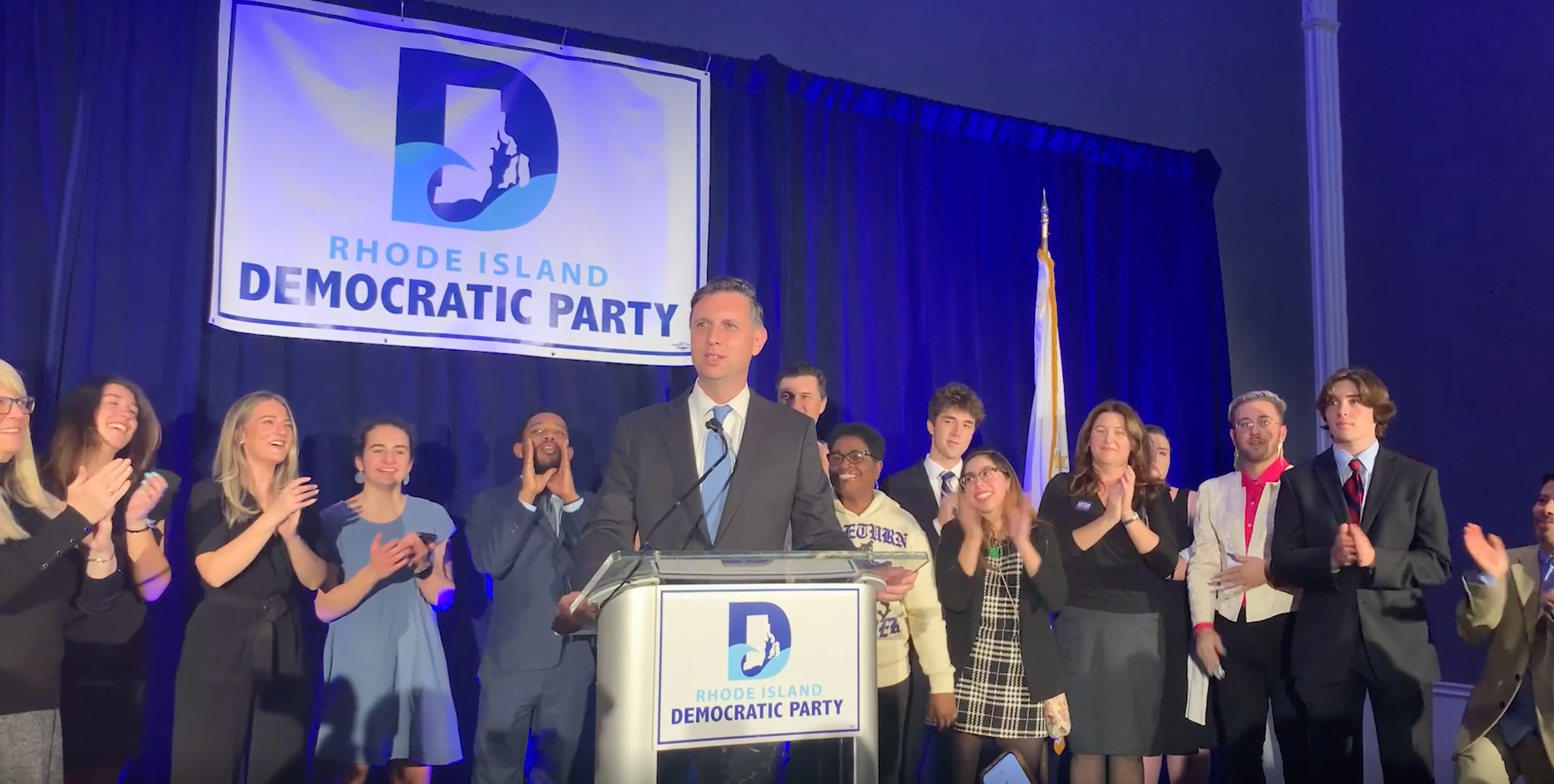
Magaziner delivers a victory speech on November 8, 2022 in Providence.

On January 26, 2022, Magaziner withdrew from the gubernatorial election and instead announced he would run to represent Rhode Island's 2nd congressional district in the U.S. House of Representatives after longtime incumbent James Langevin announced his retirement. Magaziner was a resident of the 1st congressional district but moved to a rented house in Cranston after his opponents criticized him for not living in the district, though federal law requires a representative only to be a resident of the state. He defeated five other candidates in the September 13 Democratic primary with 54% of the vote. On November 8, 2022, Magaziner won the general election, defeating Republican nominee Allan Fung, a former mayor of Cranston and two-time Republican nominee for governor 50% to 47%.

==== 2024 ====
On November 5, 2024, Magaziner won re-election to his house seat, defeating Republican Steve Corvi 58% to 42%.

=== Tenure ===
==== COVID-19 policy ====
On January 31, 2023, Magaziner voted against H.R.497, also known as the Freedom for Health Care Workers Act, which would lift COVID-19 vaccine mandates for healthcare workers.

On February 1, 2023, Magaziner voted against a resolution to end the COVID-19 national emergency.

==== Foreign policy ====
In 2023, Magaziner voted against H.Con.Res. 21, which directed President Joe Biden to remove U.S. troops from Syria within 180 days.

==== Traffic safety ====
In 2024, Magaziner introduced the Biking Instruction, Knowledge, and Education (BIKE) Act. The act would ensure that National Highway Traffic Safety Administration grants can be used for bicycle education and safety programs.

==== Voting rights ====
On February 9, 2023, Magaziner voted against H.J.Res. 24: Disapproving the action of the District of Columbia Council in approving the Local Resident Voting Rights Amendment Act of 2022, which condemns the District of Columbia's plan to allow noncitizens to vote in local elections.

==== Donald Trump ====
Magaziner voted yes on H.Res. 1367 on July 24, 2024, which created a task force on the attempted assassination of then-former president Donald Trump.

On February 8, 2025, Magaziner called Elon Musk, "an unelected, unvetted, unconfirmed man-child billionaire".

==== Congressional Stock Trading ====
Magaziner was one of the original 16 cosponsors of the Restore Trust in Congress Act (H.R.5106), introduced on September 3rd, 2025, by Republican Chip Roy of Texas. The act, a bipartisan effort to ban members of Congress and their spouses and dependents from owning and trading stocks, had 119 cosponsors as of December, 2025.

==== Opposition to deportation of U.S. veterans ====
Magaziner questioned Homeland Security Secretary Kristi Noem December 12, 2025 and asked her how many U.S. veterans had been deported by DHS. She replied “Sir, we have not deported U.S. citizens or military veterans.” He then showed, via Zoom, Purple Heart recipient and green-card holder Sae Joon Park, who had been forced to self-deport under her administration.

Park legally immigrated to the United States from South Korea when he was 7, grew up in Los Angeles and California's San Fernando Valley, and enlisted in the U.S. Army after graduating from Notre Dame High School in Sherman Oaks in 1988.. He was deployed to Panama in 1989 during Operation Just Cause and was wounded by enemy gunfire. After leaving the Army Park suffered from PTSD and his family's business was burned to the ground in 1992 during the L.A. Riots. He moved to Hawaii and was arrested for attempting to buy cocaine in 2009. He was given deferred action allowed to stay in the U.S. by federal authorities as long as he made regular check-ins, which he did until June 2025, when he was given the choice to self-deport, or be deported by DHS officials. DHS Assistant Secretary Tricia McLaughlin said Park had an “extensive criminal history” and had been given a final removal order, with the option to self-deport.

Rep. Delia Ramirez (D-Ill.) has since called for Noem to resign or be impeached due to her statements to Congress and wants a Congressional investigation into possible violations.

=== Committee assignments ===
For the 119th Congress:

- Committee on Homeland Security
  - Subcommittee on Counterterrorism and Intelligence (Ranking Member)
  - Subcommittee on Cybersecurity and Infrastructure Protection
- Committee on Natural Resources
  - Subcommittee on Energy and Mineral Resources
  - Subcommittee on Water, Wildlife and Fisheries

=== Caucus memberships ===
- Congressional Equality Caucus
- New Democrat Coalition
- Congressional Ukraine Caucus
- Labor Caucus
- Future Forum
- Congressional Arts Caucus

== Electoral history ==
Rhode Island General Treasurer Democratic primary election, 2014
Party	Candidate	Votes	%
Democratic	Seth Magaziner	80,378	66.5
Democratic	Frank Caprio	40,402	33.5

Rhode Island General Treasurer election, 2014
Party	Candidate	Votes	%
Democratic	Seth Magaziner	175,902	57.1
Independent	Ernest Almonte	131,423	42.7
Write-ins	Write-ins	588	0.2

Rhode Island General Treasurer Democratic primary election, 2018
Party	Candidate	Votes	%
Democratic	Seth Magaziner	93,967	100.0

Rhode Island General Treasurer election, 2018
Party	Candidate	Votes	%
Democratic	Seth Magaziner	237,575	64.9
Republican	Michael Riley	127,944	35.0
Write-ins	Write-ins	539	0.1

2022 Rhode Island's 2nd congressional district election
Party	Candidate	Votes	%
Democratic	Seth Magaziner	100,919	50.4
Republican	Allan Fung	93,637	46.8
Moderate	William Gilbert	5,454	2.7
Write-in		199	0.1
Total votes		200,209	100.00
Democratic hold			

2024 Rhode Island's 2nd congressional district election results
Party	Candidate	Votes	%
Democratic	Seth Magaziner (incumbent)	153,439	58.2%
Republican	Steve Corvi	109,381	41.5%
Write-in		660	0.3%
Total votes		263,480	100.0%

== Personal life ==
Magaziner married Julia McDowell in 2018. The couple has a son and a daughter.

Party political offices
Preceded by Gina Raimondo	Democratic nominee for Treasurer of Rhode Island; 2014, 2018	Succeeded by James Diossa
Political offices
Preceded by Gina Raimondo	Treasurer of Rhode Island; 2015–2023	Succeeded by James Diossa
U.S. House of Representatives
Preceded by James Langevin	Member of the U.S. House of Representatives from Rhode Island's 2nd congressional district 2023–present	Incumbent
U.S. order of precedence (ceremonial)
Preceded by Morgan Luttrell	United States representatives by seniority 332nd	Succeeded by Rich McCormick
