= 2020 United States Senate election in Rhode Island =

- November 3, 2020
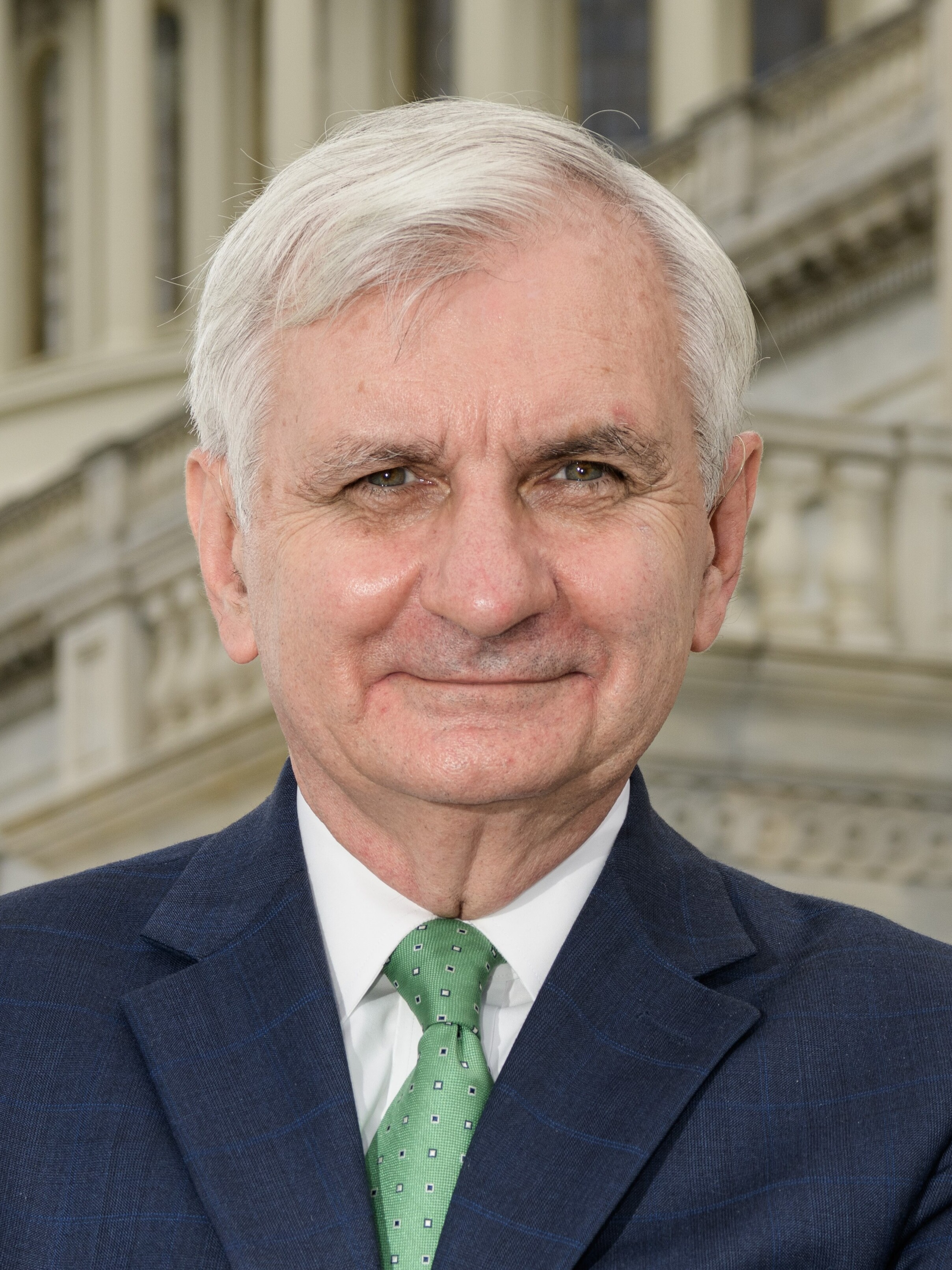

Nominee	Jack Reed	Allen Waters
Party	Democratic	Republican
Popular vote	328,574	164,855
Percentage	66.48%	33.35%
- Reed: 50–60% 60–70% 70–80% 80–90% >90% Waters: 50–60% No votes
U.S. senator before election
Jack Reed
Democratic
Elected U.S. Senator
Jack Reed
Democratic

The 2020 United States Senate election in Rhode Island was held on November 3, 2020, to elect a member of the United States Senate to represent the State of Rhode Island, concurrently with the 2020 U.S. presidential election, as well as other elections to the United States Senate, elections to the United States House of Representatives and various state and local elections. Incumbent Democratic Senator Jack Reed was challenged by Republican nominee Allen Waters. Waters was later disavowed by the state Republican Party after charges of domestic assault in 2019 became public.

Reed easily won a fifth term in office with 66.5% of the vote and a 33.1% margin. Despite his clear landslide victory, this was actually his worst Senate re-election performance, and the first time since his initial election to the U.S. Senate in 1996 in which he failed to receive at least 70% of the vote. Nevertheless, he outperformed Democratic presidential nominee Joe Biden by 7.2% in the concurrent presidential election, the largest overperformance by any Democratic Senate candidate in 2020.

Reed carried seven towns that Joe Biden failed to carry in the concurrent presidential election, including Coventry, Exeter, Hopkinton, Johnston, North Smithfield, Scituate, and Smithfield.

== Democratic primary ==
=== Candidates ===
==== Nominee ====
- Jack Reed, incumbent U.S. senator

=== Primary results ===
Democratic primary results
Party	Candidate	Votes	%
Democratic	Jack Reed (incumbent)	65,859	100.0%
Total votes		65,859	100.0%

== Republican primary ==
=== Candidates ===
==== Nominee ====
- Allen R. Waters, investment consultant

=== Primary results ===
Republican primary results
Party	Candidate	Votes	%
Republican	Allen Waters	8,819	100.0%
Total votes		8,819	100.0%

== Independents ==
=== Disqualified ===
- Lenine Camacho

== General election ==
=== Predictions ===
Source	Ranking	As of
The Cook Political Report	Safe D	October 29, 2020
Inside Elections	Safe D	October 28, 2020
Sabato's Crystal Ball	Safe D	November 2, 2020
Daily Kos	Safe D	October 30, 2020
Politico	Safe D	November 2, 2020
RCP	Safe D	October 23, 2020
DDHQ	Safe D	November 3, 2020
538	Safe D	November 2, 2020
Economist	Safe D	November 2, 2020

=== Results ===

United States Senate election in Rhode Island, 2020
Party	Candidate	Votes	%	±%
Democratic	Jack Reed (incumbent)	328,574	66.48%	−4.10%
Republican	Allen Waters	164,855	33.35%	+4.10%
Write-in		833	0.17%	±0.00%
Total votes		494,262	100.0%	
Democratic hold				

==== By county ====
	Jack Reed Democratic		Allen Waters Republican		Others	
County	Votes	%	Votes	%	Votes	%
Bristol	19,106	69.8%	8,213	30.0%	40	0.2%
Kent	54,770	60.8%	35,255	39.1%	100	0.1%
Newport	30,580	69.3%	13,527	30.6%	51	0.1%
Providence	175,783	68.2%	81,590	31.6%	538	0.2%
Washington	47,188	64.2%	26,189	35.6%	105	0.1%

==== By municipality ====
By municipality

Municipality	Jack Reed Democratic		Allen Waters Republican		Write-in		Margin		Total votes
Municipality	#	%	#	%	#	%	#	%	Total votes
Barrington	7,778	73.91	2,733	25.97	13	0.12	5,045	47.94	10,524
Bristol	7,512	67.18	3,653	32.67	17	0.15	3,859	34.51	11,182
Burrillville	3,876	47.33	4,299	52.50	14	0.17	-423	-5.17	8,189
Central Falls	3,002	81.84	658	17.94	8	0.22	2,344	63.90	3,668
Charlestown	3,044	61.01	1,940	38.89	5	0.10	1,104	22.13	4,989
Coventry	10,440	54.22	8,788	45.64	25	0.13	1,652	8.58	19,253
Cranston	22,591	61.81	13,907	38.05	48	0.13	8,684	23.76	36,546
Cumberland	11,640	62.06	7,089	37.80	26	0.14	4,551	24.27	18,755
East Greenwich	5,451	64.52	2,993	35.43	4	0.05	2,458	29.10	8,448
East Providence	15,663	70.96	6,363	28.83	47	0.21	9,300	42.13	22,073
Exeter	2,165	54.80	1,785	45.18	1	0.02	380	9.62	3,951
Foster	1,330	48.56	1,407	51.37	2	0.07	-77	-2.81	2,739
Glocester	2,910	49.40	2,971	50.44	9	0.15	-61	-1.04	5,890
Hopkinton	2,522	54.36	2,109	45.46	8	0.17	413	8.90	4,639
Jamestown	2,952	74.06	1,028	25.79	6	0.15	1,924	48.27	3,986
Johnston	8,273	56.89	6,247	42.96	22	0.15	2,026	13.93	14,542
Lincoln	7,514	61.30	4,721	38.51	23	0.19	2,793	22.79	12,258
Little Compton	1,594	64.93	858	34.95	3	0.12	736	29.98	2,455
Middletown	5,750	70.45	2,404	29.45	8	0.10	3,346	40.99	8,162
Narragansett	5,769	65.90	2,973	33.96	12	0.14	2,796	31.94	8,754
New Shoreham	728	80.09	180	19.80	1	0.11	548	60.29	909
Newport	7,917	77.58	2,276	22.30	12	0.12	5,641	55.28	10,205
North Kingstown	11,162	65.19	5,940	34.69	21	0.12	5,222	30.50	17,123
North Providence	10,569	66.43	5,301	33.32	40	0.25	5,268	33.11	15,910
North Smithfield	3,904	56.36	3,017	43.55	6	0.09	887	12.80	6,927
Pawtucket	18,166	76.92	5,375	22.76	75	0.32	12,791	54.16	23,616
Portsmouth	6,987	66.13	3,565	33.74	13	0.12	3,422	32.39	10,565
Providence	45,774	85.38	7,662	14.29	176	0.33	38,112	71.09	53,612
Richmond	2,557	54.92	2,091	44.91	8	0.17	466	10.01	4,656
Scituate	3,248	50.25	3,204	49.57	12	0.19	44	0.68	6,464
Smithfield	6,453	57.94	4,684	42.06	9	0.08	1,769	15.88	11,137
South Kingstown	11,615	71.78	4,530	27.99	37	0.23	7,085	43.78	16,182
Tiverton	5,380	61.24	3,396	38.66	9	0.10	1,984	22.58	8,785
Warren	3,816	67.50	1,827	32.32	10	0.18	1,989	35.18	5,653
Warwick	28,720	63.73	16,293	36.15	54	0.12	12,427	27.57	45,067
West Greenwich	1,906	49.29	1,958	50.63	3	0.08	-52	-1.34	3,867
West Warwick	8,253	61.18	5,223	38.72	14	0.10	3,030	22.46	13,490
Westerly	7,626	62.11	4,641	37.80	11	0.09	2,985	24.31	12,278
Woonsocket	7,870	62.58	4,685	37.25	21	0.17	3,185	25.33	12,576
Totals	328,574	66.48	164,855	33.35	833	0.17	163,719	33.12	494,262

==== By congressional district ====
Reed won both congressional districts.

District	Reed	Waters	Representative
1st	70%	29%	David Cicilline
2nd	63%	37%	James Langevin

== See also ==
- 2020 Rhode Island elections
