= Rhode Island's congressional districts =

U.S. House districts in Rhode Island

Map of Rhode Island's congressional districts from 2023 Interactive map version

Rhode Island is divided into two congressional districts, each of them represented by a member of the United States House of Representatives. No Republican has won a House seat in the state since 1990. It is the least populous state in the nation to have more than one congressional district.

== Current districts and representatives ==
The districts are represented in the 118th United States Congress by two Democrats.

Current U.S. representatives from Rhode Island
District	Member (Residence)	Party	Incumbent since	CPVI (2025)	District map
1st	Gabe Amo (Providence)	Democratic	November 13, 2023	D+12	
2nd	Seth Magaziner (Cranston)	Democratic	January 3, 2023	D+4	

== Historical and present district boundaries ==
Table of United States congressional district boundary maps in the State of Rhode Island, presented chronologically. All redistricting events that took place in Rhode Island between 1973 and 2013 are shown. District numbers are represented by the map fill colors.

Year	Statewide map
1973–1982	
1983–1992	
1993–2002	
2003–2013	
2013–2023	

== Obsolete districts ==
- Rhode Island's at-large congressional district
- Rhode Island's 3rd congressional district

== See also ==
- Rhode Island's congressional delegations
