= 2026 Rhode Island House of Representatives election =

Rhode Island congressional election

- November 3, 2026

All 75 seats in the Rhode Island House of Representatives 38 seats needed for a majority

	Majority party	Minority party	Third party
Leader	Chris Blazejewski	Michael Chippendale	Jon D. Brien
Party	Democratic	Republican	Independent
Leader since	May 7, 2026	June 23, 2022	January 3, 2023
Leader's seat	2nd	40th	49th
Seats before	64	10	1
Seats after	66	8	1
Seat change	▲2	▼2	Steady
Speaker before election
Chris Blazejewski
Democratic
Elected Speaker
TBD

The 2026 Rhode Island House of Representatives election was held on November 3, 2026, alongside the other 2026 United States elections. Voters elected members of the Rhode Island House of Representatives in all 75 of the U.S. state of Rhode Island's legislative districts to serve a two-year term.

== Retirements ==
=== Democrats ===
1. District 7: David Morales is retiring to run for mayor of Providence.
2. District 32: Robert Craven is retiring.
3. District 67: Jason Knight is retiring to run for attorney general.

== Predictions ==
Source	Ranking	As of
Sabato's Crystal Ball	Safe D	January 22, 2026
State Navigate	Safe D	October 24, 2026

== Summary of results by district ==
District	Incumbent	Party	Elected Representative	Outcome
1st	Edith Ajello	Dem	TBD	
2nd	Christopher Blazejewski	Dem	TBD	
3rd	Nathan Biah	Dem	TBD	
4th	Rebecca Kislak	Dem	TBD	
5th	Anthony DeSimone	Dem	TBD	
6th	Raymond Hull	Dem	TBD	
7th	David Morales	Dem	TBD	
8th	John J. Lombardi	Dem	TBD	
9th	Enrique Sanchez	Dem	TBD	
10th	Scott A. Slater	Dem	TBD	
11th	Grace Diaz	Dem	TBD	
12th	Jose Batista	Dem	TBD	
13th	Ramon Perez	Dem	TBD	
14th	Charlene Lima	Dem	TBD	
15th	Christopher Paplauskas	Rep	TBD	
16th	Brandon Potter	Dem	TBD	
17th	Jacquelyn Baginski	Dem	TBD	
18th	Arthur Handy	Dem	TBD	
19th	Joseph McNamara	Dem	TBD	
20th	David Bennett	Dem	TBD	
21st	Marie Hopkins	Rep	TBD	
22nd	Joseph J. Solomon Jr.	Dem	TBD	
23rd	Joe Shekarchi	Dem	TBD	
24th	Evan Shanley	Dem	TBD	
25th	Thomas Noret	Dem	TBD	
26th	Earl Read III	Dem	TBD	
27th	Patricia Serpa	Dem	TBD	
28th	George Nardone	Rep	TBD	
29th	Sherry Roberts	Rep	TBD	
30th	Justine Caldwell	Dem	TBD	
31st	Julie Casimiro	Dem	TBD	
32nd	Robert Craven	Dem	TBD	
33rd	Carol McEntee	Dem	TBD	
34th	Teresa Tanzi	Dem	TBD	
35th	Kathleen A. Fogarty	Dem	TBD	
36th	Tina Spears	Dem	TBD	
37th	Samuel Azzinaro	Dem	TBD	
38th	Brian Patrick Kennedy	Dem	TBD	
39th	Megan Cotter	Dem	TBD	
40th	Michael Chippendale	Rep	TBD	
41st	Robert Quattrocchi	Rep	TBD	
42nd	Richard Fascia	Rep	TBD	
43rd	Deborah Fellela	Dem	TBD	
44th	Gregory Costantino	Dem	TBD	
45th	Mia Ackerman	Dem	TBD	
46th	Mary Ann Shallcross Smith	Dem	TBD	
47th	David J. Place	Rep	TBD	
48th	Brian Newberry	Rep	TBD	
49th	Jon D. Brien	Ind	TBD	
50th	Stephen Casey	Dem	TBD	
51st	Robert Phillips	Dem	TBD	
52nd	Alex Marszalkowski	Dem	TBD	
53rd	Paul Santucci	Rep	TBD	
54th	William O'Brien	Dem	TBD	
55th	Arthur Corvese	Dem	TBD	
56th	Joshua Giraldo	Dem	TBD	
57th	Brandon Voas	Dem	TBD	
58th	Cherie Cruz	Dem	TBD	
59th	Jennifer Stewart	Dem	TBD	
60th	Karen Alzate	Dem	TBD	
61st	Leonela Felix	Dem	TBD	
62nd	Mary Messier	Dem	TBD	
63rd	Katherine Kazarian	Dem	TBD	
64th	Jenni Furtado	Dem	TBD	
65th	Matthew Dawson	Dem	TBD	
66th	Jennifer Boylan	Dem	TBD	
67th	Jason Knight	Dem	TBD	
68th	June Speakman	Dem	TBD	
69th	Susan R. Donovan	Dem	TBD	
70th	John Edwards	Dem	TBD	
71st	Michelle McGaw	Dem	TBD	
72nd	Terri-Denise Cortvriend	Dem	TBD	
73rd	Marvin Abney	Dem	TBD	
74th	Alex Finkelman	Dem	TBD	
75th	Lauren H. Carson	Dem	TBD	

== District 1 ==
The 1st district is represented by Democrat Edith Ajello, who is running for re-election.

=== Candidates ===
==== Declared ====
Democratic

- Edith Ajello, incumbent representative (since 2013), representative for 3rd district (1993–2013)
- Michael Garman, climate advocate

==== Endorsements ====
Edith Ajello

Organizations

- Rhode Island Democratic Party

=== Results ===
Democratic primary results
Party	Candidate	Votes	%
Democratic	Edith H. Ajello (incumbent)		
Democratic	Michael J. Garman		
Total votes			

General election results
Party	Candidate	Votes	%
Democratic	TBD		
Total votes			

== District 2 ==
The 2nd district is represented by Democrat Christopher Blazejewski, who is running for re-election uncontested.

=== Candidates ===
==== Declared ====
Democratic

- Christopher Blazejewski, incumbent representative (since 2011), Speaker of the House (since 2026), Majority Leader (2021–2026)

==== Endorsements ====
Christopher Blazejewski

Organizations

- Rhode Island Democratic Party

=== Results ===
Democratic primary results
Party	Candidate	Votes	%
Democratic	Christopher Blazejewski (incumbent)		
Total votes			

General election results
Party	Candidate	Votes	%
Democratic	Christopher Blazejewski (incumbent)		
Write-in			
Total votes			

== District 3 ==
The 3rd district is represented by Democrat Nathan Biah, who is running for re-election uncontested.

=== Candidates ===
==== Declared ====
Democratic

- Nathan Biah, incumbent representative (since 2021)

=== Results ===
Democratic primary results
Party	Candidate	Votes	%
Democratic	Nathan Biah (incumbent)		
Total votes			

General election results
Party	Candidate	Votes	%
Democratic	Nathan Biah (incumbent)		
Write-in			
Total votes			

== District 4 ==
The 4th district is represented by Democrat Rebecca Kislak, who is running for re-election uncontested.

=== Candidates ===
==== Declared ====
Democratic

- Rebecca Kislak, incumbent representative (since 2019)

==== Endorsements ====
Rebecca Kislak

Organizations

- Rhode Island Democratic Party

=== Results ===
Democratic primary results
Party	Candidate	Votes	%
Democratic	Rebecca Kislak (incumbent)		
Total votes			

General election results
Party	Candidate	Votes	%
Democratic	Rebecca Kislak (incumbent)		
Write-in			
Total votes			

== District 5 ==
The 5th district is represented by Democrat Anthony DeSimone, who is running for re-election.

=== Candidates ===
==== Declared ====
Democratic

- Anthony DeSimone, incumbent representative (since 2023)

Independent - Socialist

- Brittany Kubicek, engineer, Rhode Island Democratic Socialists of America member

==== Endorsements ====
Anthony DeSimone

Organizations

- Rhode Island Democratic Party

=== Results ===
Democratic primary results
Party	Candidate	Votes	%
Democratic	Anthony DeSimone (incumbent)		
Total votes			

General election results
Party	Candidate	Votes	%
Democratic	Anthony DeSimone (incumbent)		
Independent - Socialist	Brittany Kubicek		
Write-in			
Total votes			

== District 6 ==
The 6th district is represented by Democrat Raymond Hull, who is running for re-election uncontested.

=== Candidates ===
==== Declared ====
Democratic

- Raymond Hull, incumbent representative (since 2011)

==== Endorsements ====
Raymond Hull

Organizations

- Rhode Island Democratic Party

=== Results ===
Democratic primary results
Party	Candidate	Votes	%
Democratic	Raymond A. Hull (incumbent)		
Total votes			

General election results
Party	Candidate	Votes	%
Democratic	Raymond A. Hull (incumbent)		
Write-in			
Total votes			

== District 7 ==
The 7th district is represented by Democrat David Morales, who is retiring to run for mayor of Providence.

=== Candidates ===
==== Declared ====
Democratic

- Jo-Ann Ryan, Providence City Council member for Ward 5 (since 2015)
- Amy Santiago, social worker and chef

Republican

- Christopher Ireland, candidate for Providence School Board District 2 in 2024

=== Endorsements ===
Amy Santiago

State legislators

- Enrique Sanchez, representative for HD-9 (since 2023)
- David Morales, incumbent representative (since 2021)

Local officials

- Miguel Sanchez, Providence City Council member for Ward 6 (since 2023)

Organizations

- Rhode Island Democratic Party
Christopher Ireland

Organizations

- Rhode Island Republican Party

=== Results ===
==== Primary ====
Democratic primary results
Party	Candidate	Votes	%
Democratic	Jo-Ann Ryan		
Democratic	Amy Santiago		
Total votes			

Republican primary results
Party	Candidate	Votes	%
Republican	Christopher Ireland		
Total votes			

==== General ====
General election results
Party	Candidate	Votes	%
Democratic	TBD		
Republican	Christopher Ireland		
Write-in			
Total votes			

== District 8 ==
The 8th district is represented by Democrat John J. Lombardi, who is running for re-election uncontested.

=== Candidates ===
==== Declared ====
Democratic

- John J. Lombardi, incumbent representative (since 2013), Chief Judge of Providence Municipal Court (since 2023), Associate Judge of Providence Municipal Court (2014–2023), acting Mayor of Providence (2002–2003)

=== Endorsements ===
John J. Lombardi

Organizations

- Rhode Island Democratic Party

=== Results ===
Democratic primary results
Party	Candidate	Votes	%
Democratic	John J. Lombardi (incumbent)		
Total votes			

General election results
Party	Candidate	Votes	%
Democratic	John J. Lombardi (incumbent)		
Write-in			
Total votes			

== District 9 ==
The 9th district is represented by Democrat Enrique Sanchez, who is running for re-election uncontested.

=== Candidates ===
==== Declared ====
Democratic

- Enrique Sanchez, incumbent representative (since 2023)

=== Results ===
Democratic primary results
Party	Candidate	Votes	%
Democratic	Enrique Sanchez (incumbent)		
Total votes			

General election results
Party	Candidate	Votes	%
Democratic	Enrique Sanchez (incumbent)		
Write-in			
Total votes			

== District 10 ==
The 10th district is represented by Democrat Scott A. Slater, who is running for re-election uncontested.

=== Candidates ===
==== Declared ====
Democratic

- Scott A. Slater, incumbent representative (since 2009)

==== Endorsements ====
Scott A. Slater

Organizations

- Rhode Island Democratic Party

=== Results ===
Democratic primary results
Party	Candidate	Votes	%
Democratic	Scott A. Slater (incumbent)		
Total votes			

General election results
Party	Candidate	Votes	%
Democratic	Scott A. Slater (incumbent)		
Write-in			
Total votes			

== District 11 ==
The 11th district is represented by Democrat Grace Diaz, who is running for re-election uncontested.

=== Candidates ===
==== Declared ====
Democratic

- Grace Diaz, incumbent representative (since 2005), acting Chair of Rhode Island Democratic Party (2014)

==== Endorsements ====
Grace Diaz

Organizations

- Rhode Island Democratic Party

=== Results ===
Democratic primary results
Party	Candidate	Votes	%
Democratic	Grace Diaz (incumbent)		
Total votes			

General election results
Party	Candidate	Votes	%
Democratic	Grace Diaz (incumbent)		
Write-in			
Total votes			

== District 12 ==
The 12th district is represented by Democrat Jose Batista, who is not running for re-election.

=== Candidates ===
==== Declared ====
Democratic

- Carlos Cedeno, candidate for HD-12 in 2020
- Arlette Hidalgo, teacher

==== Endorsements ====
Carlos Cedeno

State legislators

- Ana Quezada, senator for SD-02 (since 2017)

=== Results ===
Democratic primary results
Party	Candidate	Votes	%
Democratic	Carlos Cedeno		
Democratic	Arlette Hidalgo		
Total votes			

General election results
Party	Candidate	Votes	%
Democratic	TBD		
Write-in			
Total votes			

== District 13 ==
The 13th district is represented by Democrat Ramon Perez, who is running for re-election.

=== Candidates ===
==== Declared ====
Democratic

- Ramon Perez, incumbent representative (2017–2018, 2021–present)

Republican

- Derick Reels

=== Endorsements ===
Ramon Perez (D)

Organizations

- Rhode Island Democratic Party
Derick Reels (R)

Organizations

- Rhode Island Republican Party

=== Results ===
==== Primary elections ====
Democratic primary results
Party	Candidate	Votes	%
Democratic	Ramon Perez (incumbent)		
Total votes			

Republican primary results
Party	Candidate	Votes	%
Republican	Derick Reels		
Total votes			

==== General election ====
Republican primary results
Party	Candidate	Votes	%
Democratic	Ramon Perez (incumbent)		
Republican	Derick Reels		
Write-in			
Total votes			

== District 14 ==
The 14th district is represented by Democrat Charlene Lima, who is running for re-election.

=== Candidates ===
==== Declared ====
Democratic

- Naiommi Baret
- Charlene Lima, incumbent representative (since 1993), Deputy Speaker (2010–2022)
- Kaissielle Ramos

=== Endorsements ===
Charlene Lima

Organizations

- Rhode Island Democratic Party

=== Results ===
Democratic primary results
Party	Candidate	Votes	%
Democratic	Naiommi Baret		
Democratic	Charlene Lima (incumbent)		
Democratic	Kaissielle Ramos		
Total votes			

General election results
Party	Candidate	Votes	%
Democratic	TBD		
Write-in			
Total votes			

== District 15 ==
The 15th district is represented by Republican Christopher Paplauskas, who is running for re-election.

=== Candidates ===
==== Declared ====
Republican

- Christopher Paplauskas, incumbent representative (since 2025), deputy chief of staff of Cranston mayor Kenneth Hopkins, former Cranson City Council member for Ward 5

Democratic

- Collene Crudele, family court lawyer, Cranston City Council member for Ward 4 (1996–1998)

Independent

- Allan Fung, mayor of Cranston (2009–2021), Republican gubernatorial nominee in 2014 and 2018, husband of former HD-15 representative Barbara Ann Fenton-Fung

=== Endorsements ===
Christopher Paplauskas (R)

Organizations

- Rhode Island Republican Party
Colleen Crudele (D)

Organizations

- Rhode Island Democratic Party

=== Results ===
==== Primary elections ====
Republican primary results
Party	Candidate	Votes	%
Republican	Christopher Paplauskas (incumbent)		
Total votes			

Democratic primary results
Party	Candidate	Votes	%
Democratic	Colleen Crudele		
Total votes			

==== General election ====
General election results
Party	Candidate	Votes	%
Republican	Christopher Paplauskas (incumbent)		
Democratic	Colleen Crudele		
Independent	Allan Fung		
Write-in			
Total votes			

== District 16 ==
The 16th district is represented by Democrat Brandon Potter, who is eligible to run for re-election but has not yet stated if he will do so.

== District 17 ==
The 17th district is represented by Democrat Jacquelyn Baginski, who is eligible to run for re-election but has not yet stated if she will do so.

== District 18 ==
The 18th district is represented by Democrat Arthur Handy, who is eligible to run for re-election but has not yet stated if he will do so.

== District 19 ==
The 19th district is represented by Democrat Joseph McNamara, who is eligible to run for re-election but has not yet stated if he will do so.

== District 20 ==
The 20th district is represented by Democrat David Bennett, who is eligible to run for re-election but has not yet stated if he will do so.

== District 21 ==
The 21st district is represented by Republican Marie Hopkins, who is eligible to run for re-election but has not yet stated if she will do so.

== District 22 ==
The 22nd district is represented by Democrat Joseph J. Solomon Jr., who is eligible to run for re-election but has not yet stated if he will do so.

== District 23 ==
The 23rd district is represented by Democrat Joe Shekarchi, who is eligible to run for re-election but has not yet stated if he will do so.

== District 24 ==
The 24th district is represented by Democrat Evan Shanley, who is eligible to run for re-election but has not yet stated if he will do so.

== District 25 ==
The 25th district is represented by Democrat Thomas Noret, who is eligible to run for re-election but has not yet stated if he will do so.

== District 26 ==
The 26th district is represented by Democrat Earl Read III, who is eligible to run for re-election but has not yet stated if he will do so.

== District 27 ==
The 27th district is represented by Democrat Patricia Serpa, who is eligible to run for re-election but has not yet stated if she will do so.

== District 28 ==
The 28th district is represented by Republican George Nardone, who is eligible to run for re-election but has not yet stated if he will do so.

== District 29 ==
The 29th district is represented by Republican Sherry Roberts, who is eligible to run for re-election but has not yet stated if she will do so.

== District 30 ==
The 30th district is represented by Democrat Justine Caldwell, who is eligible to run for re-election but has not yet stated if she will do so.

== District 31 ==
The 31st district is represented by Democrat Julie Casimiro, who is eligible to run for re-election but has not yet stated if she will do so.

== District 32 ==
The 32nd district is represented by Democrat Robert Craven, who is retiring.

== District 33 ==
The 33rd district is represented by Democrat Carol McEntee, who is eligible to run for re-election but has not yet stated if she will do so.

== District 34 ==
The 34th district is represented by Democrat Teresa Tanzi, who is eligible to run for re-election but has not yet stated if she will do so.

== District 35 ==
The 35th district is represented by Democrat Kathleen A. Fogarty, who is eligible to run for re-election but has not yet stated if she will do so.

== District 36 ==
The 36th district is represented by Democrat Tina Spears, who is eligible to run for re-election but has not yet stated if she will do so.

== District 37 ==
The 37th district is represented by Democrat Samuel Azzinaro, who is eligible to run for re-election but has not yet stated if he will do so.

== District 38 ==
The 38th district is represented by Democrat Brian Patrick Kennedy, who is eligible to run for re-election but has not yet stated if he will do so.

== District 39 ==
The 39th district is represented by Democrat Megan Cotter, who is eligible to run for re-election but has not yet stated if she will do so.

== District 40 ==
The 40th district is represented by Republican Michael Chippendale, who is eligible to run for re-election but has not yet stated if he will do so.

== District 41 ==
The 41st district is represented by Republican Robert Quattrocchi, who is eligible to run for re-election but has not yet stated if he will do so.

== District 42 ==
The 42nd district is represented by Republican Richard Fascia, who is eligible to run for re-election but has not yet stated if he will do so.

== District 43 ==
The 43rd district is represented by Democrat Deborah Fellela, who is eligible to run for re-election but has not yet stated if she will do so.

== District 44 ==
The 44th district is represented by Democrat Gregory Costantino, who is eligible to run for re-election but has not yet stated if he will do so.

== District 45 ==
The 45th district is represented by Democrat Mia Ackerman, who is eligible to run for re-election but has not yet stated if she will do so.

== District 46 ==
The 46th district is represented by Democrat Mary Ann Shallcross Smith, who is eligible to run for re-election but has not yet stated if she will do so.

== District 47 ==
The 47th district is represented by Republican David J. Place, who is eligible to run for re-election but has not yet stated if he will do so.

== District 48 ==
The 48th district is represented by Republican Brian Newberry, who is eligible to run for re-election but has not yet stated if he will do so.

== District 49 ==
The 49th district is represented by Independent Jon D. Brien, who is eligible to run for re-election but has not yet stated if he will do so.

== District 50 ==
The 50th district is represented by Democrat Stephen Casey, who is eligible to run for re-election but has not yet stated if he will do so.

== District 51 ==
The 51st district is represented by Democrat Robert Phillips, who is eligible to run for re-election but has not yet stated if he will do so.

== District 52 ==
The 52nd district is represented by Democrat Alex Marszalkowski, who is eligible to run for re-election but has not yet stated if he will do so.

== District 53 ==
The 53rd district is represented by Republican Paul Santucci, who is eligible to run for re-election but has not yet stated if he will do so.

== District 54 ==
The 54th district is represented by Democrat William O'Brien, who is eligible to run for re-election but has not yet stated if he will do so.

== District 55 ==
The 55th district is represented by Democrat Arthur Corvese, who is eligible to run for re-election but has not yet stated if he will do so.

== District 56 ==
The 56th district is represented by Democrat Joshua Giraldo, who is eligible to run for re-election but has not yet stated if he will do so.

== District 57 ==
The 57th district is represented by Democrat Brandon Voas, who is eligible to run for re-election but has not yet stated if he will do so.

== District 58 ==
The 58th district is represented by Democrat Cherie Cruz, who is eligible to run for re-election but has not yet stated if she will do so.

== District 59 ==
The 59th district is represented by Democrat Jennifer Stewart, who is eligible to run for re-election but has not yet stated if she will do so.

== District 60 ==
The 60th district is represented by Democrat Karen Alzate, who is eligible to run for re-election but has not yet stated if she will do so.

== District 61 ==
The 61st district is represented by Democrat Leonela Felix, who is eligible to run for re-election but has not yet stated if she will do so.

== District 62 ==
The 62nd district is represented by Democrat Mary Messier, who is eligible to run for re-election but has not yet stated if she will do so.

== District 63 ==
The 63rd district is represented by Democrat Katherine Kazarian, who is eligible to run for re-election but has not yet stated if she will do so.

== District 64 ==
The 64th district is represented by Democrat Jenni Furtado, who is eligible to run for re-election but has not yet stated if she will do so.

== District 65 ==
The 65th district is represented by Democrat Matthew Dawson, who is eligible to run for re-election but has not yet stated if he will do so.

== District 66 ==
The 66th district is represented by Democrat Jennifer Boylan, who is eligible to run for re-election but has not yet stated if she will do so.

== District 67 ==
The 67th district is represented by Democrat Jason Knight, who is retiring to run for attorney general of Rhode Island.

== District 68 ==
The 68th district is represented by Democrat June Speakman, who is eligible to run for re-election but has not yet stated if she will do so.

== District 69 ==
The 69th district is represented by Democrat Susan R. Donovan, who is eligible to run for re-election but has not yet stated if she will do so.

== District 70 ==
The 70th district is represented by Democrat John Edwards, who is eligible to run for re-election but has not yet stated if he will do so.

== District 71 ==
The 71st district is represented by Democrat Michelle McGaw, who is eligible to run for re-election but has not yet stated if she will do so.

== District 72 ==
The 72nd district is represented by Democrat Terri-Denise Cortvriend, who is eligible to run for re-election but has not yet stated if she will do so.

== District 73 ==
The 73rd district is represented by Democrat Marvin Abney, who is eligible to run for re-election but has not yet stated if he will do so.

== District 74 ==
The 74th district is represented by Democrat Alex Finkelman, who is eligible to run for re-election but has not yet stated if he will do so.

== District 75 ==
The 75th district is represented by Democrat Lauren H. Carson, who is eligible to run for re-election but has not yet stated if she will do so.
