= 2024 Rhode Island House of Representatives election =

- November 5, 2024

All 75 seats in the Rhode Island House of Representatives 38 seats needed for a majority
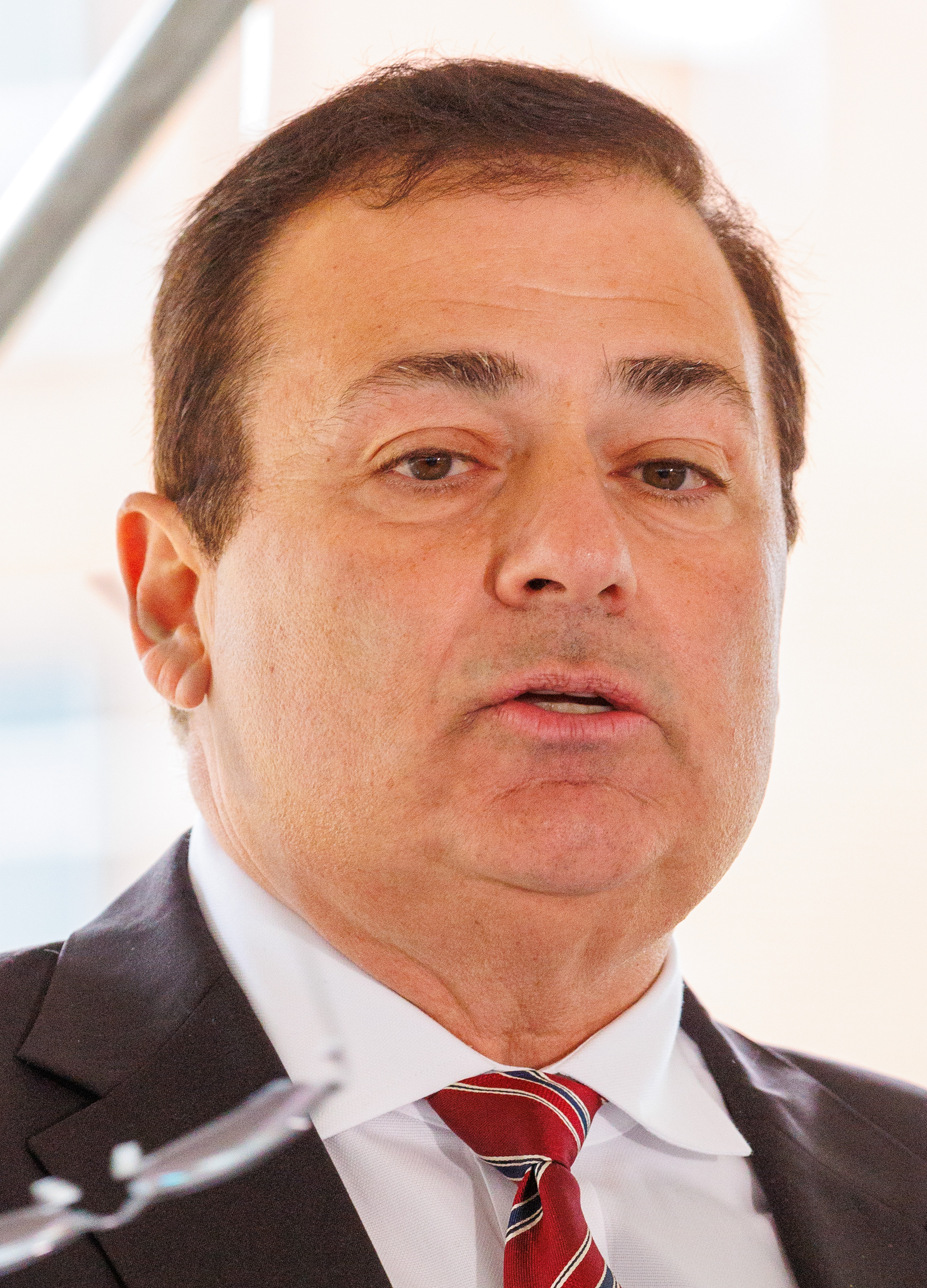

	Majority party	Minority party	Third party
Leader	Joe Shekarchi	Michael Chippendale	Jon D. Brien
Party	Democratic	Republican	Independent
Leader since	January 5, 2021	June 23, 2022	January 3, 2023
Leader's seat	23rd	40th	49th
Seats before	65	9	1
Seats after	64	10	1
Seat change	▼1	▲1	Steady
Popular vote	312,685	95,104	11,647
Percentage	72.73%	22.12%	2.71%
- Results: Democratic gain Republican gain Democratic hold Republican hold Independent hold
Speaker before election
Joe Shekarchi
Democratic
Elected Speaker
Joe Shekarchi
Democratic

The 2024 Rhode Island House of Representatives elections took place on Tuesday, November 5, 2024, with the primary election held on Tuesday, September 10, 2024. Rhode Island voters elected state representatives in all 75 seats of the House to serve two-year terms.

The election coincided with United States national elections and Rhode Island state elections, including U.S. President, U.S. Senate, U.S. House, and Rhode Island Senate.

Following the previous election in 2022, Democrats held a 65-seat supermajority over the nine Republicans and the one Independent in the chamber. Republicans would have to net 29 seats to flip control of the House.

== Retirements ==
Five incumbents did not seek re-election.

=== Democrats ===
1. District 21: Camille Vella-Wilkinson is retiring.
2. District 64: Brianna Henries is retiring.

=== Republicans ===
1. District 15: Barbara Ann Fenton-Fung is retiring to run for Mayor of Cranston.
2. District 26: Patricia Morgan is retiring to run for U.S. Senate.
3. District 53: Brian Rea is retiring.

== Incumbents defeated ==
=== In primary election ===
One incumbent representative, a Democrat, was defeated in the September 10 primary election.

==== Democrats ====
1. District 42: Edward Cardillo lost renomination to Kelsey Coletta.

== Predictions ==
Source	Ranking	As of
Sabato's Crystal Ball	Safe D	October 23, 2024

== Summary of results by House of Representatives district ==
Italics denote an open seat held by the incumbent party; bold text denotes a gain for a party.

House District	Incumbent	Party	Elected Representative	Party
1	Edith H. Ajello	Dem	Edith H. Ajello	Dem Hold
2	Christopher R. Blazejewski	Dem	Christopher R. Blazejewski	Dem Hold
3	Nathan W. Biah	Dem	Nathan W. Biah	Dem Hold
4	Rebecca M. Kislak	Dem	Rebecca M. Kislak	Dem Hold
5	Anthony J. DeSimone	Dem	Anthony J. DeSimone	Dem Hold
6	Raymond A. Hull	Dem	Raymond A. Hull	Dem Hold
7	David Morales	Dem	David Morales	Dem Hold
8	John J. Lombardi	Dem	John J. Lombardi	Dem Hold
9	Enrique G. Sanchez	Dem	Enrique G. Sanchez	Dem Hold
10	Scott A. Slater	Dem	Scott A. Slater	Dem Hold
11	Grace Diaz	Dem	Grace Diaz	Dem Hold
12	Jose F. Batista	Dem	Jose F. Batista	Dem Hold
13	Ramon A. Perez	Dem	Ramon A. Perez	Dem Hold
14	Charlene Lima	Dem	Charlene Lima	Dem Hold
15	Barbara Ann Fenton-Fung	Rep	Christopher Paplauskas	Rep Hold
16	Brandon C. Potter	Dem	Brandon C. Potter	Dem Hold
17	Jacquelyn M. Baginski	Dem	Jacquelyn M. Baginski	Dem Hold
18	Arthur Handy	Dem	Arthur Handy	Dem Hold
19	Joseph McNamara	Dem	Joseph McNamara	Dem Hold
20	David A. Bennett	Dem	David A. Bennett	Dem Hold
21	Camille Vella-Wilkinson	Dem	**Marie A. Hopkins**	**Rep Gain**
22	Joseph J. Solomon Jr.	Dem	Joseph J. Solomon Jr.	Dem Hold
23	K. Joseph "Joe" Shekarchi	Dem	K. Joseph "Joe" Shekarchi	Dem Hold
24	Evan Patrick Shanley	Dem	Evan Patrick Shanley	Dem Hold
25	Thomas E. Noret	Dem	Thomas E. Noret	Dem Hold
26	Patricia Morgan	Rep	**Earl A. Read III**	**Dem Gain**
27	Patricia A. Serpa	Dem	Patricia A. Serpa	Dem Hold
28	George A. Nardone	Rep	George A. Nardone	Rep Hold
29	Sherry L. Roberts	Rep	Sherry L. Roberts	Rep Hold
30	Justine Caldwell	Dem	Justine Caldwell	Dem Hold
31	Julie A. Casimiro	Dem	Julie A. Casimiro	Dem Hold
32	Robert E. Craven	Dem	Robert E. Craven	Dem Hold
33	Carol Hagan McEntee	Dem	Carol Hagan McEntee	Dem Hold
34	Teresa Tanzi	Dem	Teresa Tanzi	Dem Hold
35	Kathleen A. Fogarty	Dem	Kathleen A. Fogarty	Dem Hold
36	Tina L. Spears	Dem	Tina L. Spears	Dem Hold
37	Samuel Angelo Azzinaro	Dem	Samuel Angelo Azzinaro	Dem Hold
38	Brian Patrick Kennedy	Dem	Brian Patrick Kennedy	Dem Hold
39	Megan L. Cotter	Dem	Megan L. Cotter	Dem Hold
40	Michael W. Chippendale	Rep	Michael W. Chippendale	Rep Hold
41	Robert Quattrocchi	Rep	Robert Quattrocchi	Rep Hold
42	Edward Cardillo	Dem	**Richard R. Fascia**	**Rep Gain**
43	Deborah A. Fellela	Dem	Deborah A. Fellela	Dem Hold
44	Gregory J. Costantino	Dem	Gregory J. Costantino	Dem Hold
45	Mia A. Ackerman	Dem	Mia A. Ackerman	Dem Hold
46	Mary Ann Shallcross Smith	Dem	Mary Ann Shallcross Smith	Dem Hold
47	David J. Place	Rep	David J. Place	Rep Hold
48	Brian C. Newberry	Rep	Brian C. Newberry	Rep Hold
49	Jon D. Brien	Ind	Jon D. Brien	Ind Hold
50	Stephen M. Casey	Dem	Stephen M. Casey	Dem Hold
51	Robert D. Phillips	Dem	Robert D. Phillips	Dem Hold
52	Alex Daniel Marszalkowski	Dem	Alex Daniel Marszalkowski	Dem Hold
53	Brian Rea	Rep	Paul M. Santucci	Rep Hold
54	William W. O'Brien	Dem	William W. O'Brien	Dem Hold
55	Arthur J. "Doc" Corvese	Dem	Arthur J. "Doc" Corvese	Dem Hold
56	Joshua J. Giraldo	Dem	Joshua J. Giraldo	Dem Hold
57	Brandon T. Voas	Dem	Brandon T. Voas	Dem Hold
58	Cherie L. Cruz	Dem	Cherie L. Cruz	Dem Hold
59	Jennifer A. Stewart	Dem	Jennifer A. Stewart	Dem Hold
60	Karen Alzate	Dem	Karen Alzate	Dem Hold
61	Leonela Felix	Dem	Leonela Felix	Dem Hold
62	Mary Duffy Messier	Dem	Mary Duffy Messier	Dem Hold
63	Katherine Sheena Kazarian	Dem	Katherine Sheena Kazarian	Dem Hold
64	Brianna Henries	Dem	Jenni Azanero Furtado	Dem Hold
65	Matthew S. Dawson	Dem	Matthew S. Dawson	Dem Hold
66	Jennifer Smith Boylan	Dem	Jennifer Smith Boylan	Dem Hold
67	Jason P. Knight	Dem	Jason P. Knight	Dem Hold
68	June S. Speakman	Dem	June S. Speakman	Dem Hold
69	Susan Ann Donovan	Dem	Susan Ann Donovan	Dem Hold
70	John G. Edwards	Dem	John G. Edwards	Dem Hold
71	Michelle E. McGaw	Dem	Michelle E. McGaw	Dem Hold
72	Terri-Denise Cortvriend	Dem	Terri-Denise Cortvriend	Dem Hold
73	Marvin L. Abney	Dem	Marvin L. Abney	Dem Hold
74	Alex S. Finkelman	Dem	Alex S. Finkelman	Dem Hold
75	Lauren H. Carson	Dem	Lauren H. Carson	Dem Hold

== Detailed Results by House of Representatives District ==
Sources for election results:

== See also ==
- 2024 United States elections
- 2024 United States presidential election in Rhode Island
- 2024 United States Senate election in Rhode Island
- 2024 United States House of Representatives elections in Rhode Island
- 2024 Rhode Island Senate election
- Rhode Island General Assembly
- Rhode Island House of Representatives
