= Frank Ferri =

American politician

Frank G. Ferri
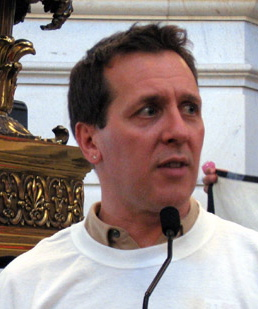

Member of the Rhode Island House of Representatives from the 22nd district
- In office December 19, 2007 – January 6, 2015
- Preceded by: Peter T. Ginaitt
- Succeeded by: Joseph J. Solomon, Jr.

Personal details
- Born: February 2, 1954 (age 72) Rhode Island
- Party: Democratic
- Spouse: Tony Caparco
- Education: Bryant University
- Occupation: Business owner

Frank G. Ferri (born February 2, 1954) is an American politician who was a Democratic member of the Rhode Island House of Representatives, representing the 22nd district from October 24, 2007 until January 6, 2015. A Rhode Island native, Ferri grew up in Providence before earning a degree in business from Bryant University. His district is located in Warwick and includes the neighborhoods of Warwick Neck and Oakland Beach.

== Elections ==
Ferri won the Democratic primary election held on October 24, 2007 to succeed Rep. Peter T. Ginaitt (D-Warwick), who had stepped down halfway through his eighth two-year term. Ferri won 57% of the vote in the three-way primary election, defeating party-endorsed candidate Edgar Ladouceur and Olin Thompson. In the general election held on November 27, 2007, he faced Republican Jonathan Wheeler and independent Carlo Pisaturo, receiving 53% of the vote to Wheeler's 33% and Pisaturo's 14%. He was sworn in on December 19, 2007. He ran for re-election in 2008 and 2010, prevailing on each occasion. In 2014, Ferri retired from the House of Representatives and ran for election to the office of Rhode Island Lieutenant Governor, but he did not win the Democratic nomination.

== Personal life ==
He has been a Warwick resident since 1985 and owns the Town Hall Lanes bowling alley. The former chair of Marriage Equality RI, he is openly gay. Along with Reps. Gordon D. Fox (D-Providence) and Deb Ruggiero (D-Jamestown), and Sen. Donna Nesselbush (D-Pawtucket), he served as one of four openly LGBT members of the Rhode Island General Assembly. His campaigns have won the support of the Gay & Lesbian Victory Fund. In 2010, Ferri completed Harvard University's John F. Kennedy School of Government program for Senior Executives in State and Local Government as a David Bohnett LGBTQ Victory Institute Leadership Fellow.
