= Edward Cardillo =

American politician

Member of the Rhode Island House of Representatives from the 42nd district
- In office January 5, 2021 – January 7, 2025
- Preceded by: Stephen Ucci
- Succeeded by: Richard Fascia

Personal details
- Party: Democratic

Edward Cardillo is an American politician. He served as a Democratic member for the 42nd district of the Rhode Island House of Representatives.

Cardillo attended at Cranston High School West, where he graduated in 1973. He worked as a mechanic. In 2021, Cardillo was elected for the 42nd district of the Rhode Island House of Representatives. He succeeded Stephen Ucci. Cardillo assumed office on January 5, 2021.

Cardillo lost his 2024 Democratic primary to Kelsey Coletta. Cardillo's nephew, Dennis Cardillo Jr., ran against him in the 2022 and 2024 Democratic primaries.
