= Stephen Ucci =

American politician

Member of the Rhode Island House of Representatives from the 42nd district
- In office January 2005 – January 5, 2021
- Preceded by: Mary Cerra
- Succeeded by: Edward T. Cardillo, Jr.

Personal details
- Born: November 6, 1971 (age 54)
- Party: Democratic
- Education: Providence College; New England School of Law

Stephen R. Ucci (born November 6, 1971) is an American politician and a Democratic member of the Rhode Island House of Representatives representing District 42 since January 2005. He was elected to serve as the Senior Deputy Majority Leader in January 2019.

== Education ==
Ucci graduated from Providence College and earned his JD from the New England School of Law.

== Elections ==
- 2012 Ucci was unopposed for both the September 11, 2012 Democratic Primary, winning with 1,061 votes and the November 6, 2012 General election, winning with 4,790 votes.
- 2004 Ucci challenged District 42 incumbent Representative Mary Cerra in the three-way September 14, 2004 Democratic Primary, winning with 1,253 votes (49.5%) and won the November 2, 2004 General election with 4,184 votes (72.2%) against Republican nominee Diane Giarrusso.
- 2006 Ucci was challenged in the September 12, 2006 Democratic Primary, winning with 1,470 votes (63.5%) and was unopposed for the November 7, 2006 General election, winning with 4,979 votes.
- 2008 Ucci was unopposed for both the September 9, 2008 Democratic Primary, winning with 1,005 votes and the November 4, 2008 General election, winning with 4,821 votes.
- 2010 Ucci was unopposed in the September 23, 2010 Democratic Primary, winning with 1,803 votes and also won the November 2, 2010 General election with 4,068 votes.
