= Anastasia Williams =

American politician

Anastacia Williams

Member of the Rhode Island House of Representatives from the 9th district
- In office January 1, 1993 – January 3, 2023
- Preceded by: Patrick J. Kennedy
- Succeeded by: Enrique Sanchez

Personal details
- Born: May 6, 1957 (age 69) Colón, Panama
- Party: Democratic
- Education: Roger Williams University

Anastacia (formerly Anastasia) P. Williams (born 1957) is an American politician who was a Democratic party member of the Rhode Island House of Representatives, representing the 9th District from 1993 until 2023. During the 2009–2010 sessions, she served on the House Committee on Municipal Government, and the Joint Committee on Accounts and Claims. She also served as the Chairperson of the House Committee on Labor.

On August 15, 2024, it was reported that Williams had changed the spelling of her first name from Anastasia to Anastacia. The news came amid the renewed attention she was receiving as part of her unsuccessful bid to regain her seat from Representative Enrique Sanchez, who had defeated her in the 2022 Democratic primary. Sanchez won renomination on September 10, 2024.
