= Robert Jacquard =

American politician (born 1958)

Member of the Rhode Island House of Representatives from the 17th district
- In office January 2003 – January 5, 2021
- Preceded by: Thomas C. Slater
- Succeeded by: Jacquelyn Baginski

Member of the Rhode Island House of Representatives from the 26th district
- In office January 1993 – January 2003
- Preceded by: Edward Marrapese
- Succeeded by: William Murphy

Personal details
- Born: May 18, 1958 (age 68) Providence, Rhode Island
- Party: Democratic
- Education: Salve Regina University; Roger Williams University
- Profession: Attorney

Robert B. Jacquard (born May 18, 1958 in Providence, Rhode Island) is an American politician and served as a Democratic member of the Rhode Island House of Representatives representing District 17 from January 2003 to January 2021. Jacquard served consecutively from January 1993 until January 2003 in the District 26 seat.

== Education ==
Jacquard attended Salve Regina University and earned his BS and JD from Roger Williams University.

== Elections ==
- 1992 To challenge District 26 incumbent Republican Representative Edward Marrapese, Jacquard won the September 15, 1992 Democratic Primary and won the November 3, 1992 General election with 3,106 votes (58.3%) against Representative Marrapese.
- 1994 Jacquard was challenged in the September 13, 1994 Democratic Primary, but won, and won the November 8, 1994 General election with 2,832 votes (64.8%) against Republican nominee John Cody.
- 1996 Jacquard was unopposed for the September 10, 1996 Democratic Primary, winning with 560 votes and won the November 5, 1996 General election with 3,089 votes (70.1%) against Republican nominee Dominic Shelzi.
- 1998 Jacquard was unopposed for both the September 15, 1998 Democratic Primary, winning with 770 votes and the November 3, 1998 General election, winning with 3,177 votes.
- 2000 Jacquard was unopposed for both the September 12, 2000 Democratic Primary, winning with 815 votes and the November 7, 2000 General election, winning with 3,480 votes.
- 2002 Redistricted to District 17, and with incumbent Representative Thomas C. Slater redistricted to District 10, Jacquard was unopposed for both the September 10, 2002 Democratic Primary, winning with 914 votes and the November 5, 2002 General election, winning with 3,723 votes.
- 2004 Jacquard was unopposed for the September 14, 2004 Democratic Primary, winning with 216 votes and won the November 2, 2004 General election with 3,478 votes (60.4%) against Republican nominee Jasper Bedrosian.
- 2006 Jacquard was unopposed for both the September 12, 2006 Democratic Primary, winning with 833 votes and the November 7, 2006 General election, winning with 4,441 votes.
- 2008 Jacquard and returning 2006 Republican challenger Jasper Bedrosian were both unopposed their September 9, 2008 primaries, setting up a rematch; Jacquard won the November 4, 2008 General election with 3,856 votes (56.2%) against Bedrosian.
- 2010 Jacquard was unopposed for both the September 23, 2010 Democratic Primary, winning with 618 votes and won the November 2, 2010 General election with 3,516 votes.
- 2012 Jacquard was unopposed for the September 11, 2012 Democratic Primary, winning with 393 votes and won the November 6, 2012 General election with 4,132 votes (69.9%) against Republican nominee Charles Hooper.
