= Raymond Johnston =

Member of the Rhode Island House of Representatives

Ray Johnston

Member of the Rhode Island House of Representatives from the 61st district
- In office January 2011 – January 5, 2021
- Preceded by: Peter Kilmartin
- Succeeded by: Leonela Felix

Personal details
- Born: October 6, 1960
- Died: November 23, 2021 (aged 61) Pawtucket, RI
- Party: Democratic
- Education: Roger Williams University
- Profession: Police detective

Raymond H. Johnston, Jr. (born October 6, 1960) was an American politician, and a Democratic member of the Rhode Island House of Representatives who has represented District 61 since January 2011. An ally of former house speaker Nicholas Mattiello, Johnston ran for re-election in the 2020 elections, but lost the in Democratic primary to Leonela Felix.

== Education ==
Johnston attended Roger Williams University.

== Elections ==
- 2012 Johnston was unopposed for both the September 11, 2012 Democratic Primary, winning with 1,050 votes and the November 6, 2012 General election, winning with 4,233 votes.
- 2010 When District 61 Democratic Representative Peter Kilmartin ran for Attorney General of Rhode Island and left the seat open, Johnston ran in the September 23, 2010 Democratic Primary, winning with 1,580 votes (67.1%) and won the November 2, 2010 General election with 2,815 votes (65.0%) against Republican nominee Brad Simonds.
