= Camille Vella-Wilkinson =

American politician

Member of the Rhode Island House of Representatives from the 21st district
- In office January 3, 2017 – January 7, 2025
- Preceded by: Eileen S. Naughton
- Succeeded by: Marie Hopkins

Personal details
- Born: December 29, 1956 (age 69)
- Party: Democratic

Camille Vella-Wilkinson (born December 29, 1956) is an American politician who served in the Rhode Island House of Representatives, representing the 21st district from 2017 to 2025.
