= Justin K. Price =

American politician

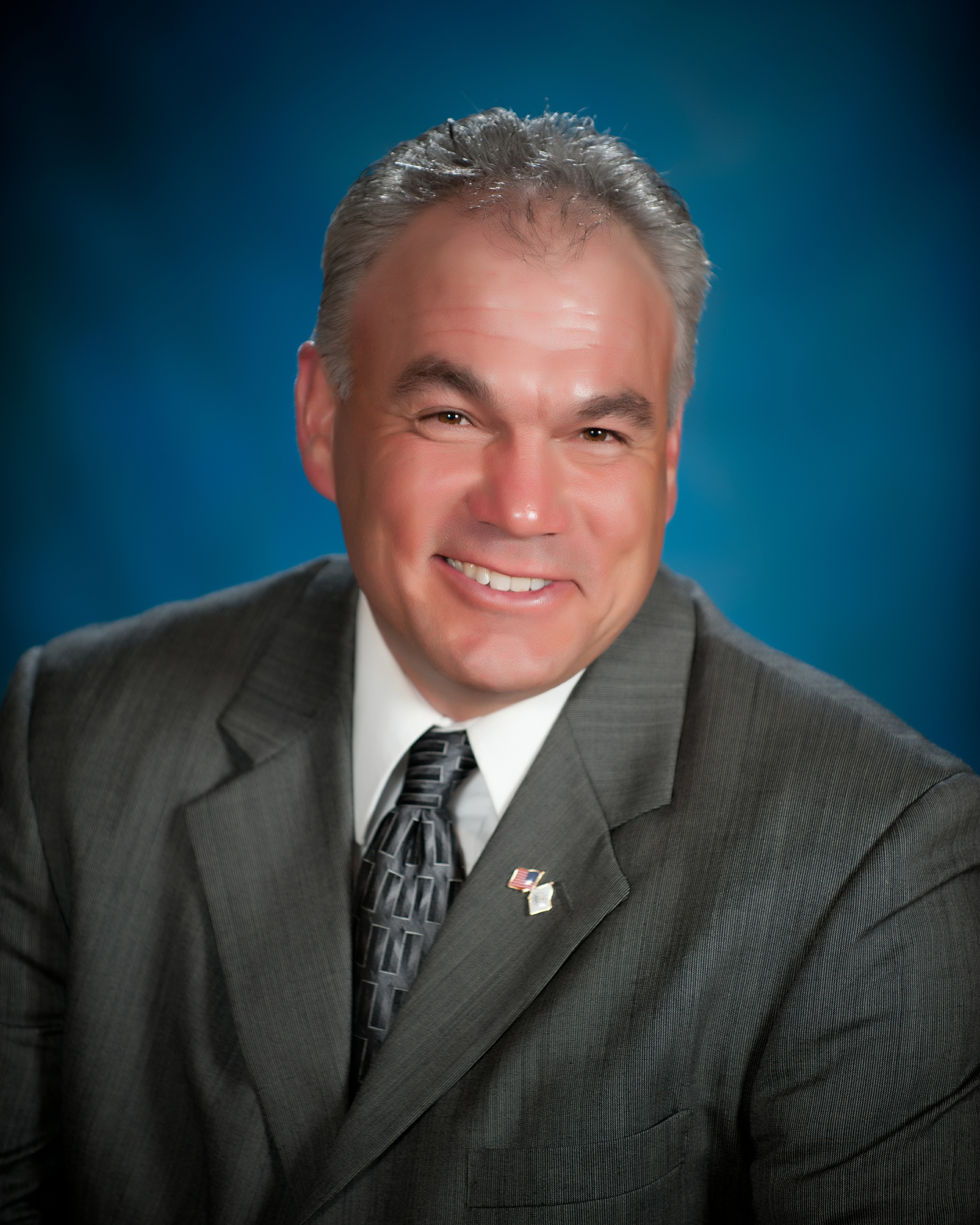

Member of the Rhode Island House of Representatives from the 39th district
- In office January 6, 2015 – January 3, 2023
- Preceded by: Larry Valencia
- Succeeded by: Megan Cotter

Personal details
- Born: December 29, 1964 (age 61) West Palm Beach, Florida
- Party: Republican
- Profession: Self-employed Carpenter
- Website: justinpriceri.com

Justin K. Price (born December 29, 1964) is an American Republican politician who served as a member of the Rhode Island House of Representatives representing District 39, which includes Exeter, Hopkinton, and Richmond, Rhode Island, from 2015 to 2023. He was first elected in 2014, defeating Larry Valencia, and was re-elected three times before losing in 2022 to Democrat Megan Cotter by 32 votes after a recount.

Price served on the Municipal Government and Housing, Small Business, Special Legislation, and Veterans' Affairs committees.

Several Rhode Island Democrats, including Seth Magaziner, called for Price to resign after Price's refusal to wear a mask at the 2021 legislative swearing in (during the COVID-19 pandemic), and his amplification of conspiracy theories regarding the 2021 United States Capitol attack. Price claims he peacefully marched to the Capitol and that antifa was responsible for a false flag.
