= Robert Quattrocchi =

American politician

Member of the Rhode Island House of Representatives from the 41st district
- Incumbent
- Assumed office 2017
- Preceded by: Michael Marcello

Personal details
- Party: Republican

Robert Quattrocchi is an American politician. He serves as a Republican member for the 41st district of the Rhode Island House of Representatives.

In 2016, Quattrocchi was elected for the 41st district of the Rhode Island House of Representatives, succeeding Michael Marcello. Quattrocchi assumed office in 2017, and was re-elected in 2018, 2020, and 2022.

In 2023, Quattrocchi was removed from his position on the House State Government & Elections Committee by Speaker Joe Shekarchi after asking Democratic Representative Rebecca Kislak if she was a "pedophile" during a debate over equity impact statements. Kislak, a lesbian, is one of only two openly LGBTQ+ members serving in the House, along with Shekarchi, a gay man.
