= Earl Read III =

American politician from Rhode Island

Member of the Rhode Island House of Representatives from the 26th district
- Incumbent
- Assumed office January 7, 2025
- Preceded by: Patricia Morgan

Personal details
- Party: Democratic

Earl A. Read III is an American politician who serves in the Rhode Island House of Representatives as a member of the Democratic Party. He has represented the 26th district since 2025.

Read previously worked as a police officer.
