= Brandon Potter (politician) =

American politician and attorney

Member of the Rhode Island House of Representatives

Member of the U.S. House of Representatives from 's 16th district
- Incumbent
- Assumed office January 5, 2021
- Preceded by: Christopher Millea

Personal details
- Born: August 6, 1984 (age 42) Rhode Island, U.S.
- Party: Democratic
- Education: Rhode Island College (BA); Roger Williams University School of Law (JD)
- Occupation: Attorney, politician

Brandon Potter (born August 6, 1984) is an American politician and attorney serving as a member of the Rhode Island House of Representatives from the 16th district, representing parts of Cranston. A Democrat aligned with progressive causes, Potter has been endorsed by U.S. Senator Bernie Sanders and supported by the Working Families Party. His tenure has included high-profile legislative debates and intraparty disputes within the Rhode Island Democratic Party.

== Early life and education ==
Potter grew up in Cranston, Rhode Island, and attended Cranston West High School. He earned his bachelor’s degree magna cum laude from Rhode Island College. He received his Juris Doctor degree from Roger Williams University School of Law in 2025.

== Political career ==
=== Elections ===
In 2020, Potter challenged incumbent Democratic state representative Christopher Millea in the Democratic primary for House District 16. Millea had been endorsed by the National Rifle Association and opposed abortion rights, positions Potter criticized during the campaign. Potter was endorsed by U.S. Senator Bernie Sanders and supported by the Rhode Island Working Families Party. He defeated Millea in the Democratic primary with 59.8% of the vote. In the 2020 general election, Potter won with 4,144 votes (53.7%).

In the 2022 election cycle, Potter faced a Democratic primary challenge from Natalya DelSanto after then–Deputy Speaker Charlene Lima publicly sought to recruit a challenger to Potter by placing a newspaper advertisement. DelSanto campaigned to Potter’s right on social issues and received endorsements from the National Rifle Association. DelSanto’s campaign received a $1,000 contribution from Lima. Potter won the 2022 Democratic primary with 67.3% of the vote.

In 2024, Potter faced another Democratic primary challenger after he opposed legislation authorizing online gambling (iGaming) in Rhode Island, a bill that was sponsored by Senate President Dominick Ruggerio. Potter said he believed the challenge was connected to his opposition to the bill. The challenger denied being recruited by Senate President Dominick Ruggerio. Potter won the 2024 Democratic primary with 76% of the vote.

=== Legislative work ===
Potter has served as Second Vice Chair of the House Health and Human Services Committee and has also served on the House Corporations Committee and the House Labor Committee.

In January 2021, following reporting that state Representative Justin Price attended the 2021 United States Capitol attack, Potter became the first elected official in Rhode Island to publicly call for Price’s resignation.

In 2021, Potter authored legislation to prohibit the production and sale of force-fed foie gras due to animal cruelty concerns.

In 2023, Potter opposed legislation authorizing online casino gaming (iGaming) in Rhode Island. He spoke on the House floor and offered amendments during debate on the bill. Despite opposition from several lawmakers, the legislation passed both chambers of the General Assembly and was signed into law.

In the 2025 legislative session, Potter sponsored legislation establishing a three-year pilot program limiting insurers’ use of prior authorization for medically necessary services ordered by primary care providers. The bill was later ceremonially signed into law by Governor Dan McKee.

In 2023, the Rhode Island House passed legislation sponsored by Potter to decriminalize the possession of limited amounts of psilocybin (“magic mushrooms”) and to authorize rulemaking for potential therapeutic use, contingent on federal approval.

=== Intraparty disputes ===
Potter was previously affiliated with the Rhode Island Political Cooperative but was later expelled from the organization following his support for House Speaker Joe Shekarchi.

== Professional career ==
Potter is an attorney whose legal practice focuses on medical malpractice and catastrophic injury cases.

While earning his Juris Doctor degree, Potter volunteered pro bono with the Rhode Island Public Defender’s Office.
