= Christopher Paplauskas =

American politician from Rhode Island

Member of the Rhode Island House of Representatives from the 15th district
- Incumbent
- Assumed office January 7, 2025
- Preceded by: Barbara Ann Fenton-Fung

Personal details
- Born: Providence, Rhode Island, U.S.
- Party: Republican

Christopher G. Paplauskas is an American politician who is a Republican member of the Rhode Island House of Representatives. He has represented the 15th district since 2025.

Paplauskas was a five-term City Councilman in Cranston, Rhode Island. He was first elected to the city council in 2014.
