= Paul Santucci =

American politician from Rhode Island

Member of the Rhode Island House of Representatives from the 53rd district
- Incumbent
- Assumed office January 7, 2025
- Preceded by: Brian Rea

Personal details
- Party: Republican

Paul Santucci is an American politician serving in the Rhode Island House of Representatives as a Republican. He has represented the 53rd district since 2025.

Santucci is a long-term resident of Smithfield, Rhode Island.
