= List of Rhode Island General Assemblies =

List of Rhode Island state legislatures

The following is a list of terms of the Rhode Island General Assembly, the legislature of the state of Rhode Island in the United States. Rhode Island became part of the United States in 1790. The first state constitution was effected in 1843.

Prior to around 1904, the legislature met in "five State Houses that were located in different towns in Rhode Island": Bristol, East Greenwich, Newport, Providence, and South Kingstown. "In November, 1900, the Constitution was amended in favor of one session of the General Assembly each year, to commence at Providence on the first Tuesday in January of each year." Since around 1904, the legislature meets in the State House building in Providence.

Before 1912, elections took place annually. "On November 7, 1911, the Constitution was amended, establishing biennial elections for...members of the General Assembly."

== List of legislatures ==
=== Prior to 1913 ===
Year	Session	Last election
1798	May, June, October	
1799	February, May, June, October	April 1799
1800	February, May, June, October	
1801	May, June, October	
1802	May, June, October	
1803	February, May, October	
Rhode Island Constitution of 1842
		1865
1882-1883		April 1882
1888-1889?		1888
1890-1891?		1890
1895-1896?		April 1895
		April 1900
1901	began in January	April 1901
1910		November 1909
1911		

=== 1913-present ===
Year	Session	Last election
1913–1914		November 5, 1912
1925-1926		
1927-1928		
1929-1930		
1931-1932		
1933-1934		
1935-1936		
1937-1938		
1939-1940		
1941-1942		
1943-1944		
1945-1946		
1947-1948		
1949-1950		
1951-1952		
1953-1954		
1955-1956		
1957-1958		
1959-1960		
1961-1962		
1963-1964		
1969-1970		
1971-1972		
1973-1974		
1975-1976		
Rhode Island Constitution of 1986
1989–1990		November 1988
1991–1992		November 1990
1993–1994		November 1992
1995–1996		November 1994
1997–1998	January–June 1998	November 1996
1999–2000	January–June 1999; January–June 2000	November 1998
2001–2002	January–June 2001; January–June 2002	November 2000
2003–2004	January–June 2003; January–June 2004	November 2002
2005–2006	January–June 2005; January–June 2006	November 2004
2007–2008	January–June, October 2007; January–June 2008	November 2006
2009–2010	January 5 - June 11, 2010	November 2008
2011–2012	January 4 - July 1, special session in October, 2011; January 3 - June 13, 2012	November 2010
2013–2014	January 1 - July 5, 2013; January 7 - June 23, 2014	November 2012
2015–2016	January 6 - June 25, 2015; January 5 - June 18, 2016	November 2014
2017–2018	January 3 - June 30, 2017; January 2 - June 25, 2018	November 2016
2019–2020	January 1 - June 30, 2019; January 7 - August 30, 2020	November 2018
2021–2022	January 5 - July 1, 2021; January 4 - June 23, 2022	November 2020: House, Senate
2023–2024	January 3 - June 16, 2023; January 2 - June 14, 2024	November 2022: House, Senate

== See also ==
- List of speakers of the Rhode Island House of Representatives
- Elections in Rhode Island
- List of governors of Rhode Island
- Politics of Rhode Island
- Historical outline of Rhode Island
- Lists of United States state legislative sessions
