= Jason Knight (politician) =

American politician

Member of the Rhode Island House of Representatives from the 67th district
- Incumbent
- Assumed office January 3, 2017
- Preceded by: Jan Malik

Personal details
- Born: October 28, 1969 (age 57)
- Party: Democratic
- Spouse: Nicole Jellinek
- Children: 2
- Education: Emerson College (BFA); Suffolk University (JD)

Jason Knight (born October 28, 1969) is an American politician, currently serving in the Rhode Island General Assembly. He serves as Democratic member for the 67th district of the Rhode Island House of Representatives, representing the towns of Warren and Barrington.

In 2016, Knight won the election for the 67th district of the Rhode Island House of Representatives, succeeding Jan Malik, whom he defeated in the Democratic primary.

Knight supports gun control and in 2023 he supported a bill to ban assault weapons.

He is Jewish.
