= Richard Fascia =

American politician

Member of the Rhode Island House of Representatives from the 42nd district
- Incumbent
- Assumed office January 7, 2025
- Preceded by: Edward Cardillo

Personal details
- Born: Providence, Rhode Island, U.S.
- Party: Republican

Richard Fascia is an American politician and former police officer who is currently serving as a Republican member of the Rhode Island House of Representatives, representing the 42nd district. He was first elected in 2024, defeating Democratic nominee Kelsey Coletta. The district includes portions of Cranston and Johnston.

Fascia became the first Republican to represent District 42 in over 80 years.

== Personal life and career ==
Fascia graduated from Roger Williams University with a Bachelor of Science degree. in Fascia previously worked for the Providence Police Department. He also served as a member of the Johnston Zoning Board.
