= Mary Ann Shallcross Smith =

American politician

Member of the Rhode Island House of Representatives from the 46th district
- Incumbent
- Assumed office January 5, 2021
- Preceded by: John Lyle Jr.
- In office January 2, 2009 – January 4, 2011
- Preceded by: William J. McManus
- Succeeded by: Jeremiah O'Grady

Personal details
- Born: August 2, 1952 (age 74)
- Party: Democratic
- Spouse: Ronald R. Smith
- Children: Keith W. Shallcross, Christopher J. Smith, Amy Shallcross Vogel
- Education: University of Rhode Island
- Profession: educator; child care consultant; proprietor of day care services

Mary Ann Shallcross Smith (born August 2, 1952) is an American educator and a Democratic member of the Rhode Island House of Representatives, representing the 46th District from 2009 to 2011, and again starting in 2021. During the 2009-2010 sessions, she served on the House Committees on Constituent Services, Finance, Labor and Small Business. Shallcross Smith was defeated for reelection in the 2 November 2010 general elections to Jeremiah T. O'Grady. She went on to be the president and CEO of Dr. Day Care, and she founded the Business Owners of Child Care Association of Rhode Island (BOCA) in 2011. Shallcross Smith was also the chairperson of the Northern Rhode Island Chamber of Commerce in 2016.
