= Nathan Biah =

American politician (born 1971)

Member of the Rhode Island House of Representatives from the 3rd district
- Incumbent
- Assumed office January 5, 2021
- Preceded by: Moira Walsh

Personal details
- Born: December 14, 1971 (age 54) Monrovia, Liberia
- Party: Democratic
- Spouse: Thumbelina Biah
- Education: Rhode Island College

Nathan W. Biah Sr. (born December 14, 1971) is an American politician and educator who serves in the Rhode Island House of Representatives for the 3rd district.

== Early life and education ==
Born and raised in Monrovia, the capital of Liberia, Biah was his parents' only child. Biah was sent to a preparatory school considered one of the "most prestigious" in Liberia, but his education was interrupted by the First Liberian Civil War, which caused Biah to emigrate to the United States. In 1999, he earned a bachelor's degree in criminal justice from Rhode Island College, and in 2007, Biah received a master's degree in education from University of Rhode Island.

== Political career ==
Biah announced a primary challenge to incumbent representative Moira Walsh in 2020. Walsh, a staunch progressive, had been an opponent of Speaker of the Rhode Island House Nicholas Mattiello, who thus supported Biah. Biah was also endorsed by Rhode Island Right to Life, an anti-abortion organization. In contrast to most other successful primaries in the 2020 Rhode Island House elections, where progressives had ousted allies of Mattiello, Biah defeated Walsh 64–35, and was unopposed in the general election. He currently serves on the Innovation, Internet, and Technology Committee, the Finance Committee, which produces the state budget and the Education Committee.

He had originally declared his candidacy for US Representative of Rhode Island's 1st congressional district in March 2023, but has since withdrawn as a candidate and will not appear on the ballot for the special Democratic primary for U.S. representative of the 1st congressional district to be held on September 5, 2023.
