= Megan Cotter =

American politician

Megan Cotter is an American politician representing the 39th district in the Rhode Island House of Representatives. A member of the Democratic Party, she was first elected in November 2022.

== Early life and personal life ==
Cotter grew up in Elmhurst, Providence. After graduating from Classical High School in 2002, she triple majored in English, Comparative Literature, and Classical Studies at the University of Rhode Island. She works for the seafood distributor Foley Fish.

== Political career ==
Cotter first ran for the District 39 seat in 2020, losing to incumbent Republican representative Justin Price by about four percentage points. In a 2022 rematch, she defeated Price by 32 votes, 3,031 to 2,999, in a three-way race that also included independent candidate Sean Comella; after the narrow tally, Price requested a recount, which the Rhode Island Board of Elections conducted without changing the outcome. She assumed office on January 3, 2023, and serves on the House committees on Education, Health and Human Services, and Small Business.

In a third consecutive contest against Price, Cotter won re-election on November 5, 2024, defeating him with about 54 percent of the vote. The Rhode Island Board of Elections certified 4,671 votes for Cotter to Price's 3,973, a margin of 698. Cotter won even though Donald Trump carried all three towns in the district, and she was credited with—and described a strategy of—appealing to Republican-leaning voters.

Ahead of the 2026 election, Cotter filed for re-election without a Democratic primary challenger; two Republicans, Paul Michaud and Jasmin Roy, filed to contest the District 39 seat.
