= Lauren H. Carson =

American politician

Member of the Rhode Island House of Representatives from the 75th district
- Incumbent
- Assumed office January 6, 2015
- Preceded by: Peter F. Martin

Personal details
- Born: February 26, 1954 (age 72)
- Party: Democratic
- Education: Ramapo College (BA); University of Rhode Island (MBA, (MA)
- Website: Official website

Lauren H. Carson (born February 26, 1954) is an American politician and Democratic member of the Rhode Island House of Representatives, representing the 75th District since 2015. This district includes the city of Newport, Rhode Island. She is a member of the Municipal Government Committee, the House Committee on Oversight, and the House Small Business Committee. She focuses on issues relating to the environment, small business, tourism and government transparency, and she is considered to be an "ardent environmentalist".

A graduate of Benedictine Academy in Elizabeth, New Jersey, Carson earned her undergraduate degree with a major in sociology at Ramapo College before receiving graduate degrees in history and business at the University of Rhode Island.

Carson also works as a community organizer and environmental policy analyst with the Rhode Island branch of Clean Water Action.

== Elections ==
- 2014 Carson ran to represent the 75th District in the Rhode Island House of Representatives on a campaign of "Putting Newport First." She beat the incumbent Peter F. Martin in the Democratic Primary on September 9, 2014, winning 53.5% of the votes. She was unchallenged in the general election.
- 2016 Carson faced Independent Michael W. Smith in the General election on November 8, 2016. She won that election with 56.22% of the vote.
