= Michelle McGaw =

American politician and pharmacist

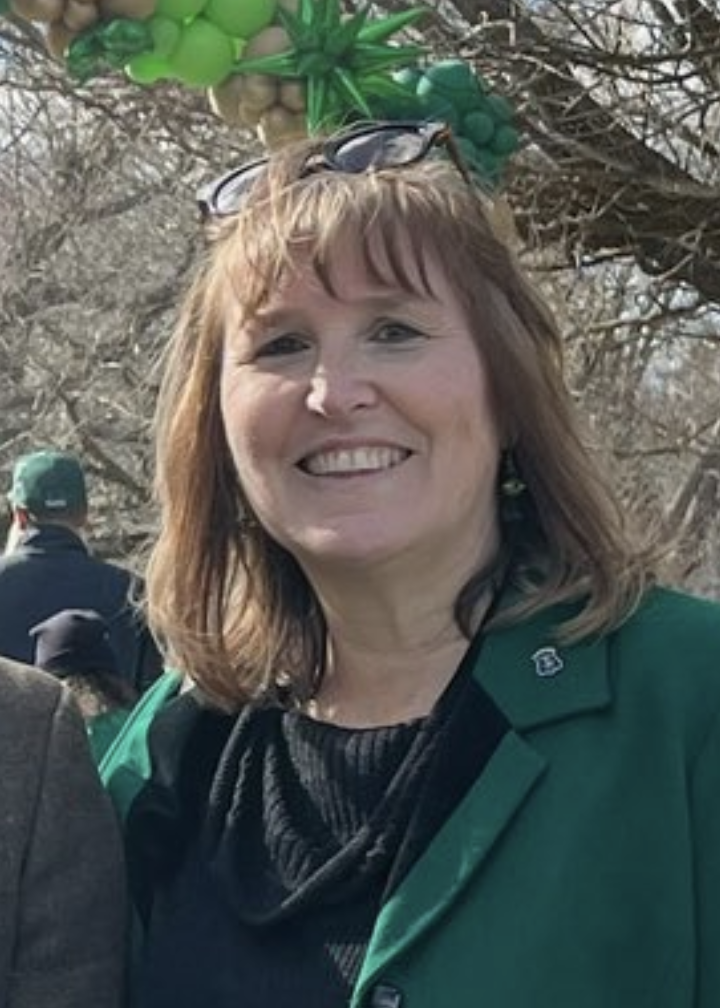

Member of the Rhode Island House of Representatives from the 71st district
- Incumbent
- Assumed office January 2021
- Preceded by: Dennis Canario

Personal details
- Born: 1966 (age 59–60)
- Party: Democratic
- Spouse: Jim McGaw
- Children: 2
- Education: University of Rhode Island Pharmacy College

Michelle E. McGaw (born 1966), is an American Democratic politician and pharmacist. Since January 2021, McGaw has served in the Rhode Island House of Representatives, representing the 71st district, which covers Portsmouth, Tiverton, and Little Compton. In the Rhode Island State House, she serves on the House State Government and Elections Committee, House Veterans' Affairs Committee, and the House COVID-19 Vaccine Task Force.

== Early life and education ==
McGaw was born in 1966. In 1984, she graduated St. Paul Catholic High School, and in 1989, McGaw graduated from the University of Rhode Island College of Pharmacy.

== Employment and local leadership ==
McGaw is a practicing consultant pharmacist. Since 2005, she has worked for Omnicare under the consultant pharmacist position. Prior to that, McGaw was a clinical program manager at PharmaCare.

McGaw, has served on a number of state and local committees. On the statewide level, McGaw was a board member for the Rhode Island Democratic Women's Caucus. Locally, McGaw is a current member of the Portsmouth Democratic Town Committee and has served on the Portsmouth Waste and Recycling Committee, and the 2020 Portsmouth Charter Review Committee. McGaw has been active in Newport County Little League Baseball and other recreational activities.

== Rhode Island State House of Representatives ==
=== First term (2021-2023) ===
In 2020, McGaw announced her candidacy to succeed retiring incumbent Dennis Canario in the 71st district. In the Democratic primary, McGaw defeated Tiverton Town Councilor John Edwards by a whopping 60%. In the general election, McGaw faced Republican Little Compton attorney Amy Veri, and won.

McGaw serves on the Rhode Island State House Government and Elections Committee, House Veterans' Affairs Committee, and the House COVID-19 Vaccine Special Task Force. McGaw has introduced several bills including one that would require Rhode Island's Energy Facility Sitting Board to deny applications for power plants that would negatively affect Rhode Island's ability to reach its carbon-emissions-reduction goals. One of her other proposed pieces of legislation was a bill that would allow temporary vehicle registrations to last for 30 days instead of the previous 20 days for dealer sales, or just two days for private sales, which have caused long hold backs for the Department of Motor Vehicles appointments.

=== Second term (2023-) ===
In 2022, McGaw fended off an Independent challenger, Kobe Taylor, in the general election for the House seat. She garnered 64% of the vote.

In May 2023, McGaw introduced a bill which would make human composting (scientifically known as "natural organic reduction") legal in the state, serving as alternatives to burial and cremation. In late May, the Rhode Island House of Representatives approved legislation sponsored by McGaw which would require health insurers to cover the costs of epinephrine injectors, known as EpiPens.

== Personal life ==
McGaw lives in Portsmouth with her husband Jim. She has two adult children.
