= Justine Caldwell =

American politician

Member of the Rhode Island House of Representatives from the 30th district
- Incumbent
- Assumed office January 1, 2019
- Preceded by: Antonio Giarrusso

Personal details
- Party: Democratic
- Education: University of Rhode Island; Bowling Green State University

Justine Caldwell is an American politician and is a Democratic member of the Rhode Island House of Representatives, representing District 30 (East Greenwich, Rhode Island and West Greenwich, Rhode Island).

== Education ==
Caldwell attended and earned a bachelor's and master's degrees from the University of Rhode Island. Caldwell received a PhD in American studies from Bowling Green State University.

== Election history ==
2018 Rhode Island House of Representatives election, 30th district
Party	Candidate	Votes	%
Democratic	Justine Caldwell	3,686	51.1
Republican	Antonio Giarrusso (incumbent)	3,517	48.8

2020 Rhode Island House of Representatives election, 30th district
Party	Candidate	Votes	%
Democratic	Justine Caldwell (incumbent)	4,822	52.0
Republican	Antonio Giarrusso	4,432	47.0
