= Sherry Roberts =

American politician

Member of the Rhode Island House of Representatives from the 29th district
- Incumbent
- Assumed office January 2015
- Preceded by: Lisa P. Tomasso

Personal details
- Born: July 29, 1968 (age 58)
- Party: Republican
- Education: University of Rhode Island
- Website: repsherryroberts.com

Sherry Roberts (born July 29, 1968) is an American politician and a Republican member of the Rhode Island House of Representatives representing District 29 beginning in 2015. She serves as the Deputy Minority Whip of her caucus.

== Education ==
Roberts attended the Community College of Rhode Island and University of Rhode Island.

== Electoral record ==
District 29 general election, 2024
Party	Candidate	Votes	%
Republican	Sherry L. Roberts (incumbent)	5,870	100.00%
Total votes		4,489	100.00%
Republican hold			

District 29 general election, 2022
Party	Candidate	Votes	%
Republican	Sherry L. Roberts (incumbent)	4,489	100.00%
Total votes		4,489	100.00%
Republican hold			

District 29 general election, 2020
Party	Candidate	Votes	%
Republican	Sherry Roberts (incumbent)	6,506	96.7
Write-in	Write-ins	225	3.3
Total votes		6,731	100.0

District 29 general election, 2018
Party	Candidate	Votes	%
Republican	Sherry Roberts	3,586	60.5%
Independent	Ernest J. Nardolillo	2,324	39.2%

District 29 general election, 2016
Party	Candidate	Votes	%
Republican	Sherry Roberts	3,950	54.6%
Democratic	Lisa Tomasso	3,269	45.2%

District 29 general election, 2014
Party	Candidate	Votes	%
Democratic	Lisa Tomasso	2,558	47.6%
Republican	Sherry Roberts	2,805	52.2%

District 29 Republican primary, 2014
Party	Candidate	Votes	%
Republican	Sherry Roberts	371	63.6%
Republican	Joseph N. Allen	212	36.4%

== Personal life ==
Roberts is a resident of West Greenwich, Rhode Island.
