= Joseph J. Solomon Jr. =

American politician

Joseph Solomon
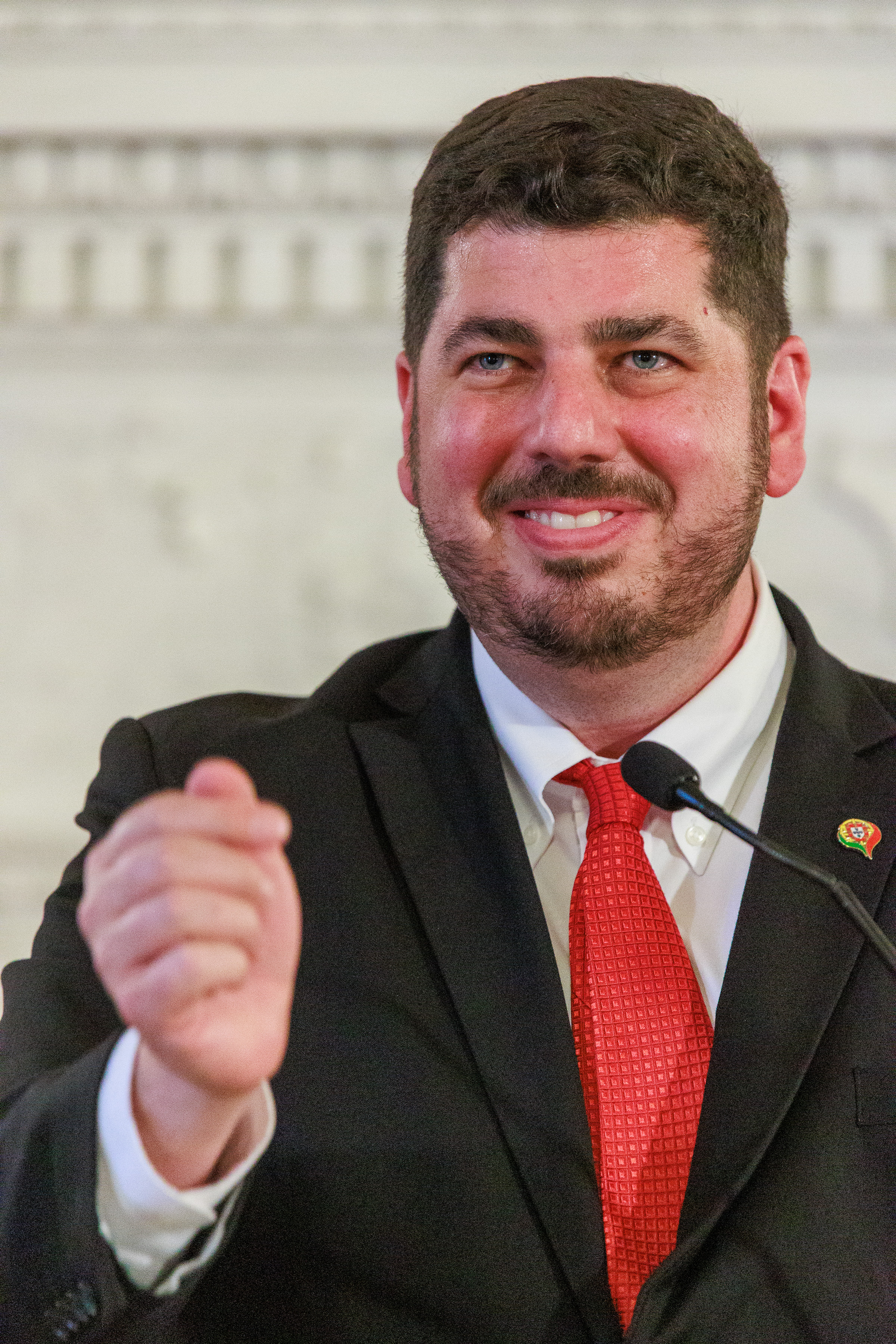

Member of the Rhode Island House of Representatives from the 22nd district
- Incumbent
- Assumed office January 6, 2015
- Preceded by: Frank Ferri

Personal details
- Born: 1983 (age 42–43)
- Party: Democratic
- Education: Providence College (BS); New England School of Law (JD)

Joseph J. Solomon Jr. (born 1983) is an American politician and Democratic member of the Rhode Island House of Representatives, representing the 22nd District since 2015. This district includes the city of Warwick, where he has lived for his entire life. He is the son of former Warwick mayor Joseph J. Solomon Sr.

He is the chair of the House Corporations Committee and a member of the House Committee on Oversight, and the House Veterans' Affairs Committee. He is a member of the Rhode Island Bar Association and is a lawyer.

He was a candidate for the Democratic Nomination for Attorney General of Rhode Island in 2026, losing to Kim Ahern in a four way primary.

== Elections ==
- 2014 Solomon ran to represent the 22nd District as Frank Ferri was retiring to run for Lieutenant Governor of Rhode Island. He beat Jennifer Siciliano in the Democratic Primary on September 9, 2014, winning 60.7% of the votes. He then beat Republican Ralph Leone in the General election on November 4, 2014 with 64.4% of the vote.
- 2016 Solomon again faced Jennifer Siciliano in the Democratic Primary on September 13, 2016, and he won with 59.14% of the vote. Then he faced Independent Elizabeth Smith in the General election on November 8, 2016. He won that election with 64.36% of the vote.
- 2018 Solomon was unopposed in the Democratic primary election and the General election.
- 2020 Solomon was unopposed in the Democratic primary election. He faced Independent Gerald Carbone in the general election on November 3, 2020 and won with 52.2% of the vote.
- 2022 Solomon faced Zakary Pereira in the Democratic Primary on September 13, 2022, and he won with 67.2% of the vote. Then he faced Republican David Stone in the General election on November 8, 2022. He won that election with 56.1% of the vote.
- 2024 Solomon was unopposed in the Democratic primary election on September 10, 2024. Then he faced Republican David Stone in the General election on November 5, 2024. He won with 56.9% of the vote.
