= Kathleen Fogarty =

American politician

Kathleen A. Fogarty

Member of the Rhode Island House of Representatives from the 35th district
- Incumbent
- Assumed office January 3, 2015
- Preceded by: Spencer Dickinson

President of the South Kingstown Town Council
- In office November 25, 2008 – November 25, 2010
- Preceded by: Mary S. Eddy
- Succeeded by: Ella M. Whaley

Member of the South Kingstown Town Council
- In office November 25, 2002 – November 25, 2012

Personal details
- Born: July 29, 1965 (age 60) Warwick, Rhode Island, U.S.
- Party: Democratic
- Spouse: Brendan J. Fogarty
- Children: 2
- Education: Providence College (BS)

Kathleen A. Fogarty (born July 29, 1965) is an American politician currently serving as a Democratic member of the Rhode Island House of Representatives, representing the 35th House District since 2015.

== Personal life ==
Fogarty was born in Warwick, Rhode Island on July 29, 1965. She was raised in Smithfield, Rhode Island and graduated from Smithfield High School in 1983. Fogarty graduated from Providence College in 1987, with a Bachelor's degree in health service administration.

Fogarty is married to Brendan J. Fogarty. They have two children, Brendan and Lauren.

== Political career ==
Fogarty first won election to the South Kingstown Town Council in 2002. Fogarty was reelected four times, before choosing not to run again in 2012. Fogarty served as the Council's vice president from 2004 to 2008 and as the Council's president from 2008 to 2010.

Fogarty was elected to the Rhode Island House of Representatives in 2014, after defeating incumbent Representative Spencer Dickinson in the Democratic primaries.

Fogarty currently sits on the House Environment and Natural Resources Committee and the House Health and Human Services Committee, as well as serving as the First Vice-Chair of the House Municipal Government and Housing Committee and the Chair of the House Special Legislation Committee.

Fogarty has built a distinguished political career marked by a strong commitment to public health, environmental protection, education, and safety. She has successfully sponsored laws mandating insurance coverage for breast cancer screenings, improving dam safety with climate change considerations, and expanding mental health access through a two-tiered licensing system. A dedicated proponent for senior citizens, Fogarty worked to streamline SNAP benefits, while her advocacy for the University of Rhode Island has led to significant investments in oceanographic education and research. Additionally, she has championed laws that enhance public safety, such as banning hand-held mobile devices while driving, and supported the well-being of children by securing mandatory recess time in elementary schools.

== Elections ==
- 2002 Fogarty was elected to the South Kingstown Town Council.
- 2004 Fogarty placed second in the November 2, 2004 General election for the South Kingstown Town Council, receiving 6,115 votes (12.14%).
- 2006 Fogarty placed third in the November 7, 2006 General election for the South Kingstown Town Council, receiving 6,432 votes (12.64%).
- 2008 Fogarty placed first in the November 4, 2008 General election for the South Kingstown Town Council, receiving 7,515 votes (13.5%).
- 2014 Fogarty challenged District 35 incumbent Democratic representative Spencer E. Dickinson in the September 9, 2010 Democratic primary, winning with 672 votes (51.3%) and won the November 4, 2014 General election with 2,113 votes (57.6%), defeating Republican nominee Lacey McGreevy.
- 2016 Fogarty again defeated Spencer Dickinson in the September 13, 2016 Democratic Primary, winning with 584 votes (54.8%) and won the November 6, 2018 General election with 2,825 votes (57.7%), defeating independent Bruce K. Waidler.
- 2018 Fogarty was unopposed in the September 12, 2018 Democratic Primary, winning with 1,078 votes and won the November 6, 2018 General election with 3,003 votes (69.6%), defeating independent John Brandon Monk.
- 2020 Fogarty defeated Spencer Dickinson a third time in the September 8, 2020 Democratic Primary, winning with 1,182 votes (75.7%) and won the November 3, 2020 General election unopposed with 4,386 votes (95.6%).
- 2022 Fogarty was unopposed in the September 13, 2022 Democratic Primary, winning with 1,136 votes and won the November 8, 2022 General election with 2,879 votes (64.3%), defeating republican William Paniccia.
- 2024 Fogarty was unopposed in the September 10, 2024 Democratic Primary, winning with 790 votes and won the November 5, 2024 General election with 2,975 votes (60.2%), defeating republican Jennifer Nerbonne.
