= Jennifer Stewart =

American politician

Member of the Rhode Island House of Representatives from the 59th district
- Incumbent
- Assumed office January 3, 2023
- Preceded by: Jean Philippe Barros

Personal details
- Born: Chicago, Illinois, U.S.
- Party: Democratic
- Spouse: Benjamin Evans
- Education: University of Chicago

Jennifer A. Stewart is an American teacher and politician. She serves as a Democratic member for the 59th district of the Rhode Island House of Representatives. Before taking office, Stewart was a high school teacher at Moses Brown School.

== Early life ==
Stewart was born in Chicago, Illinois, and attended Catholic school for her primary and secondary education. She attended the University of Chicago and has a master's degree in political science.

== Career ==
Following university, Stewart and her fiancé Benjamin moved to Massachusetts so he could attend the Northeastern University School of Law. While in Massachusetts, Stewart began teaching at a high school in Cambridge. The two eventually moved to Rhode Island where Ben was raised. While living in Rhode Island, Stewart taught political science at Moses Brown School. She was honored with the U.S. Presidential Scholars Teacher Recognition Award in 2011 and received the Fulbright Distinguished Award for Teaching in 2018. With her Fulbright award, Stewart spent a semester abroad in Finland to learn about the Finnish education system.

Upon choosing to campaign for the Rhode Island House of Representatives, Stewart began putting up political signs more than 30 days before the election. As such, she unintentionally broke a local law prohibiting such actions. The American Civil Liberties Union of Rhode Island sued the city on her behalf, arguing that durational limits on the posting of political signs were unconstitutional. The city settled with Stewart and another political candidate and agreed to pay attorneys’ fees and compensatory damages. Stewart was eventually elected for the 59th district of the Rhode Island House of Representatives.

As a member of the Rhode Island House of Representatives, Stewart also serves on the House Health and Human Services Committee, the House Innovation, Internet and Technology Committee, and the Special Legislative Study Commission to Evaluate and Provide Recommendations on Mandated Safety Protocols for Rhode Island Schools.
