= Mia Ackerman =

Member of the Rhode Island House of Representatives

Member of the Rhode Island House of Representatives from the 45th district
- Incumbent
- Assumed office January 1, 2013
- Preceded by: Rene Menard

Personal details
- Born: Mia A. Ackerman; March 28, 1965 (age 61)
- Party: Democratic
- Education: Binghamton University

Mia A. Ackerman (born March 28, 1965) is an American politician and a Democratic member of the Rhode Island House of Representatives representing District 45 since January 1, 2013. Ackerman is currently the Deputy Majority Whip of the house. She previously served as Chair of the House Committee on Conduct and Deputy Majority Leader.

== Education ==
Ackerman earned her BA in political economics from Binghamton University.

== Elections ==
- 2012 Ackerman challenged District 45 incumbent Democratic Representative Rene Menard in the September 11, 2012 Democratic Primary, winning with 1,065 votes (54.2%) and was unopposed for the November 6, 2012 General election, winning with 4,992 votes.

== Legislation ==
Ackerman was the main sponsor to the bill H 7736, an anti-BDS law requiring state contractors to certify that they are not, and will not, engage in certain boycotts. While the law text doesn't mention Israel specifically, Ackerman has clarified that the intent of the bill is to combat BDS: "we want to get out in front of [BDS], as opposed to react to. Support for BDS is becoming a national trend, with a lot of that support stemming from universities. As a small state, we need to take a stand."
