= David Bennett (Rhode Island politician) =

Member of the Rhode Island House of Representatives

Member of the Rhode Island House of Representatives from the 20th district
- Incumbent
- Assumed office January 2011
- Preceded by: Alfred A. Gemma

Personal details
- Born: April 8, 1955 (age 71)
- Party: Democratic
- Education: Rhode Island Junior College; Rhode Island College

David A. Bennett (born April 8, 1955) is an American politician and a Democratic member of the Rhode Island House of Representatives representing District 20 since January 2011.

== Education ==
Bennett earned his AA from Rhode Island Junior College (now the Community College of Rhode Island) and his BA from Rhode Island College.

== Elections ==
- 2018 Bennett was unopposed for the September 12, 2018 Democratic primary (winning with 1,083 votes), advancing to a rematch with Independent candidate Dan Elliott. On November 6, 2018 Bennett defeated Elliott, winning 2,508 to 1,952.
- 2016 Bennett was unopposed for the September 13, 2016 Democratic primary (winning with 561 votes), setting up a General Election race against political newcomer Dan Elliott, an Independent. On November 8, 2016 Bennett defeated Elliott, winning 2,926 to 2,129.
- 2014 Bennett was unopposed for both the September 9, 2014 Democratic primary (winning with 1,023 votes) and the November 4, 2014 General Election (winning with 2,836 votes).
- 2012 Bennett was unopposed for both the September 11, 2012 Democratic Primary, winning with 433 votes and the November 6, 2012 General election, winning with 3,884 votes.
- 2010 Bennett challenged District 20 incumbent Representative Alfred A. Gemma in the September 14, 2010 Democratic Primary, winning with 902 votes (62.9%) and won the four-way November 2, 2010 General election with 2,660 votes (57.7%) against Republican nominee Henri Koldyk and Moderate candidate William Pierce. Incumbent Representative Al Gemma ran a write-in campaign in the general election following his defeat in the primary, however, his vote total is not listed in the above results.
- 2008 When District 31 Democratic Senator John C. Revens Jr. retired and left the seat open, Bennett ran in the September 9, 2008 Democratic Primary, but lost by 10 votes to Erin Lynch; Lynch won the November 4, 2008 General election against Republican nominee Thomas Madden, who had run for the seat in 2006.

== 2020 DCYF Legislation ==
In February 2020, Bennett joined State Representative Ray Hull in introducing a bill to create a DCYF legislative oversight commission.
