= Susan R. Donovan =

American politician

Susan Donovan

Member of the Rhode Island House of Representatives from the 69th district
- Incumbent
- Assumed office January 3, 2017
- Preceded by: Raymond Gallison

Personal details
- Born: Bristol, Rhode Island, U.S.
- Party: Democratic
- Education: Rhode Island College (BS, MA)
- Website: Official website

Susan R. Donovan is an American politician and Democratic member of the Rhode Island House of Representatives, representing the 69th District since being elected in November 2016. This district includes the cities of Bristol and Portsmouth, Rhode Island. She is a member of the House Committee on Environment and Natural Resources and House Committee on Health, Education and Welfare.

In the legislature, Donovan focuses on educational issues because she was a public school teacher in the Bristol Warren School System for 33 years. She also works on issues relating to the environment and housing. Additionally, she is a supporter of reproductive rights and was endorsed by Planned Parenthood.

== Elections ==
- 2016 Donovan ran to represent the 69th District in the Rhode Island House of Representatives after Raymond Gallison resigned due to a federal investigation of his finances. She defeated Todd Giroux in the Democratic Primary on September 13, 2016 with 89.02% of the votes. She then defeated Republican Antonio F. Avila and Libertarian Analee A. Berretto in the General election on November 8, 2016 with 48.8% of the votes.
