= Samuel Azzinaro =

American politician (born 1943)

Member of the Rhode Island House of Representatives from the 37th district
- Incumbent
- Assumed office January 2009
- Preceded by: Peter Lewiss

Personal details
- Born: January 29, 1943 (age 83)
- Party: Democratic
- Education: Rhode Island School of Design
- Website: SamAzzinaro.weebly.com

Samuel A. Azzinaro (born January 29, 1943) is an American politician and a Democratic member of the Rhode Island House of Representatives representing District 37 since January 2009. A veteran who served in the United States National Guard and Army Reserves, Azzinaro is currently the Chairman of the House Committee on Veterans' Affairs.

== Education ==
Azzinaro attended the Rhode Island School of Design, studying textile courses.

== Elections ==
- 2012 Azzinaro was unopposed for both the September 11, 2012 Democratic Primary, winning with 358 votes and the November 6, 2012 General election, winning with 5,311 votes.
- 2008 When District 37 Democratic Representative Peter Lewiss retired and left the seat open, Azzinaro was unopposed for the September 9, 2008 Democratic Primary, winning with 164 votes and won the November 4, 2008 General election with 3,794 votes (53.4%) against Republican nominee George Markham, who had run for the seat in 2006.
- 2010 Azzinaro was unopposed for the September 23, 2010 Democratic Primary, winning with 250 votes and won the three-way November 2, 2010 General election with 3,062 votes (60.2%) against Republican nominee Philip Gingerella and Independent candidate Robert Gionet.
