= Leonela Felix =

American politician and lawyer

Member of the Rhode Island House of Representatives from the 61st district
- Incumbent
- Assumed office January 5, 2021
- Preceded by: Raymond Johnston

Personal details
- Born: October 4, 1987 (age 39) Boston, Massachusetts, U.S.
- Party: Democratic Party
- Education: Community College of Rhode Island Rhode Island College
- Alma mater: New England School of Law

Leonela Felix (born October 4, 1987) is an American politician and lawyer who is the state representative in the Rhode Island House of Representatives for the 61st district. A member of the Democratic Party, she won election in the 2020 elections, primarying incumbent Democrat Raymond Johnston, and beating Republican Robert Wheeler in the general election. A progressive, Felix primaried Johnston with the support of the Working Families Party.
