= Cherie Cruz =

American politician

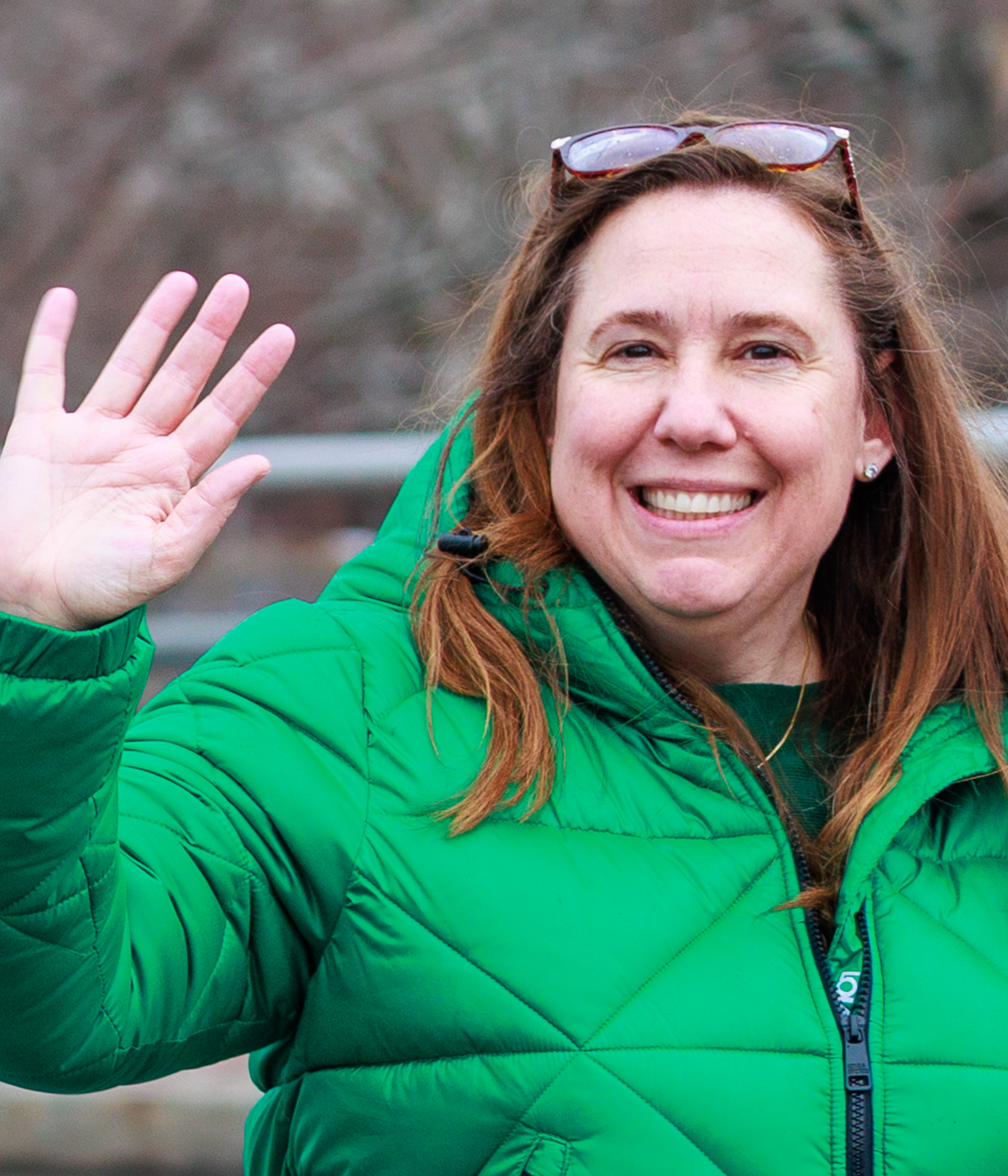

Member of the Rhode Island House of Representatives from the 58th district
- Incumbent
- Assumed office January 3, 2023
- Preceded by: Carlos Tobon

Personal details
- Born: Pawtucket, Rhode Island, U.S.
- Party: Democratic
- Education: Community College of Rhode Island (AA); Brown University (BA, MA)
- Website: House website

Cherie Cruz is an American politician who has served as a member of the Rhode Island House of Representatives from the 58th district since 2023. She is a member of the Democratic Party.
