= Arthur Corvese =

American politician

Doc Corvese

Member of the Rhode Island House of Representatives from the 55th district
- Incumbent
- Assumed office January 7, 2003
- Preceded by: Mary Cerra

Member of the Rhode Island House of Representatives from the 71st district
- In office January 5, 1999 – January 7, 2003
- Preceded by: Vincent Mesolella
- Succeeded by: William Enos

Personal details
- Born: January 14, 1956 (age 70) Washington, D.C., U.S.
- Party: Democratic
- Spouse: Terry Corvese
- Children: 2
- Education: Providence College (B.S.); New England College of Optometry (O.D.)

Arthur J. “Doc” Corvese (born January 14, 1956) is an American politician and a Democratic member of the Rhode Island House of Representatives representing District 55 since January 2003. Corvese served consecutively from January 1999 until January 2003 in the District 71 seat.

== Education ==
Corvese earned his BS from Providence College and his OD from the New England College of Optometry.

== Elections ==
- 1998 When District 71 Democratic Representative Vincent Mesolella left the Legislature and left the seat open, Corvese was unopposed for the September 15, 1998, Democratic Primary, winning with 1,122 votes and won the November 3, 1998, General election with 2,293 votes (57.4%) against Independent nominee Charles Lombardi.
- 2000 Corvese was unopposed for both the September 12, 2000, Democratic Primary, winning with 2,209 votes and the November 7, 2000, General election, winning with 3,756 votes.
- 2002 Redistricted to District 55, and with incumbent Democratic Representative Mary Cerra redistricted to District 42, Corvese was unopposed for both the September 10, 2002, Democratic Primary, winning with 1,705 votes, and the November 5, 2002, General election, winning with 4,276 votes.
- 2004 Corvese was unopposed for both the September 14, 2004, Democratic Primary, winning with 1,226 votes and the November 2, 2004, General election, winning with 5,233 votes.
- 2006 Corvese was unopposed for both the September 12, 2006, Democratic Primary, winning with 1,893 votes and the November 7, 2006, General election, winning with 5,208 votes.
- 2008 Corvese was challenged in the September 9, 2008, Democratic Primary, winning with 1,483 votes (64.2%) and was unopposed for the November 4, 2008, General election, winning with 5,363 votes.
- 2010 Corvese was unopposed for both the September 23, 2010, Democratic Primary, winning with 1,895 votes, and the November 2, 2010, General election, winning with 4,168 votes.
- 2012 Corvese was unopposed for both the September 11, 2012, Democratic Primary, winning with 1,759 votes and the November 6, 2012, General election, winning with 5,208 votes.
