= Alex Marszalkowski =

American politician

Member of the Rhode Island House of Representatives from the 52nd district
- Incumbent
- Assumed office January 2017
- Preceded by: Karen MacBeth

Personal details
- Party: Democratic Party
- Education: Mount Saint Charles Academy
- Alma mater: Roger Williams University

Alex Marszalkowski (born February 22, 1987) is a member of the Rhode Island House of Representatives. A member of the Democratic Party, Marszalkowski represents the 52nd district. First elected in 2016, Marszalkowski currently serves as Deputy Majority Leader of the Rhode Island house. In 2020, Marszalkowski won re-election against Republican Chris Hogan and Independent Daniel Baglini.

Marszalkowski graduated from Mount St. Charles Academy in 2005, Roger Williams University with a bachelor's degree in history and psychology before graduating from the Roger Williams University School of Law in 2012.
