= Marvin Abney =

American politician (born 1949)

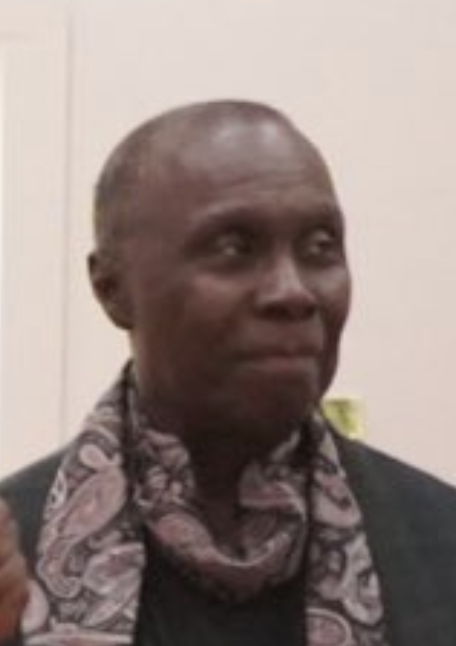

Member of the Rhode Island House of Representatives from the 73rd district
- Incumbent
- Assumed office January 1, 2013
- Preceded by: J. Russell Jackson

Personal details
- Born: November 10, 1949 (age 76) Texarkana, Texas, U.S.
- Party: Democratic
- Education: Stephen F. Austin State University; Webster University; University of Rhode Island

Military service
- Branch/service: United States Army
- Rank: Major

Marvin L. Abney (born November 10, 1949, in Texarkana, Texas) is an American politician and a Democratic member of the Rhode Island House of Representatives representing District 73 since January 1, 2013. During the legislative session beginning in 2015, Abney was one of three African-Americans in the Rhode Island Legislature. Representative Abney is the current Chairman of the House Finance Committee.

== Education ==
Abney earned his bachelor's degree in public administration from Stephen F. Austin State University (1975), his Master's degree in management from Webster University (1982), attended the United States Army Command and General Staff College in Munich, Germany (late 1980s), and earned his MBA from the University of Rhode Island (2000).

== Elections ==
- 2012 When District 73 Democratic Representative J. Russell Jackson retired and left the seat open, Abney ran in the September 11, 2012, Democratic Primary, winning with 612 votes (70.1%) and was unopposed for the November 6, 2012, General election, winning with 3,697 votes.
