= Karen Alzate =

American politician (born 1987)

Member of the Rhode Island House of Representatives from the 60th district
- Incumbent
- Assumed office January 1, 2019
- Preceded by: David Coughlin, Jr.

Personal details
- Born: December 26, 1987 (age 38) Pawtucket, Rhode Island, U.S.
- Party: Democratic
- Education: Rhode Island College (BA); Roger Williams University (MA)

Karen Alzate (born December 26, 1987) is an American politician and a Democratic member of the Rhode Island House of Representatives, representing District 60.

== Early life and education ==
Alzate was born on December 26, 1987, in Pawtucket, Rhode Island. As a first-generation American, she graduated from Tolman High School and earned a bachelor's degree from Rhode Island College. Following this, she earned her Master's degree in Community Development at the Roger Williams University School of Continuing Studies. She also participated on the New Leader's Council for two years, a non-profit organization that promotes, trains and recruits progressive leaders.

== Career ==
Alzate was officially sworn into the Rhode Island House of Representatives on January 1, 2019 and subsequently appointed to the House Health, Education and Welfare Committee, the House Labor Committee, and the House Special Legislation Committee. During her first year in office, Alzate introduced a bill to create a commission to encourage more persons of color to enter education careers which held its first meeting on November 19. She also co-sponsored the Reproductive Privacy Act and oversaw legislation that moves the date of primaries to the eighth Tuesday preceding biennial state elections.

During the COVID-19 pandemic, Alzate was named to the coronavirus vaccine distribution task force led by Raymond Hull. In this role, she advocated for a prioritizion to distribute the COVID-19 vaccine for communities of color.
