= Enrique Sanchez (politician) =

American politician

Member of the Rhode Island House of Representatives from the 9th district
- Incumbent
- Assumed office January 3, 2023
- Preceded by: Anastasia Williams

Personal details
- Born: July 10, 1996 (age 30)
- Party: Democratic

Enrique G. Sanchez (born July 10, 1996) is an American politician representing the 9th district in the Rhode Island House of Representatives. A member of the Democratic Party, he was first elected in November 2022. Sanchez serves on the House Corporations Committee and the House Special Legislation Committee.

Sanchez graduated from Rhode Island College in 2019 with a degree in public relations. His grandfather, Enrique Sánchez Mora, immigrated from Mexico to the United States and settled in Providence, Rhode Island.

== Electoral history ==
=== 2022 ===
In the Democratic primary, Sanchez challenged endorsed incumbent Anastasia P. Williams, who had held the seat since 1992, prevailing by 14.4 percentage points. Sanchez, endorsed by the Democratic Socialists of America, successfully defeated Williams from the left. He was unopposed in the general election.

2022 Rhode Island House of Representatives District 9 – Democratic primary
Party	Candidate	Votes	%	±%
Democratic	Enrique George Sanchez	802	53.6	
Democratic	Anastasia P. Williams	587	39.2	
Democratic	Lonnie L. Mangum	108	7.2	

2022 Rhode Island House of Representatives District 9 – General election
Party	Candidate	Votes	%	±%
Democratic	Enrique George Sanchez	1,836	96.8	+23.8
Write-in		60	3.2	+2.3

=== 2024 ===
Williams, who changed the spelling of her first name to Anastacia, returned in an attempt to unseat Sanchez in 2024. A third candidate, Santos Javier, who had previously unsuccessfully run twice for the Ward 15 seat on the Providence City Council (which includes District 9's Olneyville and Silver Lake neighborhoods), also ran. In a campaign rife with allegations of impropriety, primarily against Javier, Sanchez successfully defended his seat in the Democratic primary. His predecessor finished a distant third. Sanchez will be unopposed in the November general election.

2024 Rhode Island House of Representatives District 9 – Democratic primary
Party	Candidate	Votes	%	±%
Democratic	Enrique G. Sanchez	606	53.8	+0.2%
Democratic	Santos Javier	295	26.2	New
Democratic	Anastacia P. Williams	225	20.0	−19.2%
