= Anthony DeSimone =

American politician (born 1990)

Member of the Rhode Island House of Representatives from the 5th district
- Incumbent
- Assumed office January 3, 2023
- Preceded by: Marcia Ranglin-Vassell

Personal details
- Born: March 26, 1990 (age 36)
- Party: Democratic
- Parent: John DeSimone (father)
- Education: Rhode Island College

Anthony DeSimone (born March 26, 1990) is an American politician representing Rhode Island's 5th District in the Rhode Island House of Representatives. He serves on the Corporations Committee and the Municipal Government and Housing Committee. He was first elected in 2022 as a member of the Democratic Party.

DeSimone resides in Wanskuck, Providence and works for the Providence Water Supply Board. He attended Rhode Island College. His father, John DeSimone, formerly served in the seat and as the Majority Leader of the Rhode Island House of Representatives.
