= Thomas Noret =

American politician

Member of the Rhode Island House of Representatives from the 25th district
- Incumbent
- Assumed office January 1, 2019
- Preceded by: Michael Marcello

Personal details
- Party: Democratic
- Education: Community College of Rhode Island; Roger Williams University

Thomas Noret is an American politician. He serves as a Democratic member for the 25th district of the Rhode Island House of Representatives.

Noret attended at the Bishop Hendricken High School, where he later graduated in 1987. He then attended at Community College of Rhode Island, where he earned his associate degree. Noret also attended at the Roger Williams University, where he earned his Bachelor of Science degree. He served in the Rhode Island Air National Guard. Noret worked as a law enforcement at the Coventry Police Department.

In 2019, Noret won the election for the 25th district of the Rhode Island House of Representatives. He succeeded Jared Nunes. Noret assumed his office on January 1, 2019.
