= Arthur Handy =

American politician

Member of the Rhode Island House of Representatives from the 18th district
- Incumbent
- Assumed office January 2003
- Preceded by: John Simonian and Nancy Hetherington

Personal details
- Born: February 15, 1967 (age 59) Richmond, Virginia, U.S.
- Party: Democratic
- Education: University of Miami
- Website: arthandy.com

Arthur 'Art' Handy (born February 15, 1967) is an American politician and a Democratic member of the Rhode Island House of Representatives representing District 18 since January 2003.

== Education ==
Handy earned his BA in Marine Affairs from the University of Miami.

== Website ==
Handy's website has expired and is now a Chinese gambling website.

== Elections ==
- 2012 Handy was challenged in the September 11, 2012, Democratic Primary, winning with 850 votes (65.8%) and won the three-way November 6, 2012, General election with 3,524 votes (62.7%) against Republican nominee Donald Gendron and Independent candidate Mark Stoutzenberger.
- 2002 With District 18 incumbent Democratic Representative Leon Tejada redistricted to District 11, Handy ran in the three-way September 10, 2002, Democratic Primary, winning with 1,124 votes (64.4%) and won the three-way November 5, 2002, General election with 2,567 votes (53.0%) against Republican nominee Robert Clarkin and Independent candidate James Sulanowski.
- 2004 Handy and returning 2002 Republican opponent Robert Clarkin were both unopposed for their September 14, 2004, primaries, setting up a rematch; Handy won the November 2, 2004, General election with 3,321 votes (57.6%) against Clarkin.
- 2006 Handy was unopposed for the September 12, 2006, Democratic Primary, winning with 1,175 votes and won the November 7, 2006, General election with 3,871 votes (74.2%) against Republican nominee Richard Nordlund.
- 2008 Handy and returning 2006 Republican challenger Richard Nordlund were both unopposed for their September 9, 2008, primaries, setting up a rematch; Handy won the November 4, 2008, General election with 4,076 votes (69.1%) against Nordlund.
- 2010 Handy was challenged in the September 23, 2010, Democratic Primary, winning with 931 votes (69.0%); returning 2006 and 2008 Republican challenger Nordlund was unopposed for his primary, setting up their third contest; Handy won the November 2, 2010, General election with 2,834 votes (65.0%) against Nordlund.
