= Matthew Dawson (politician) =

American politician (born 1968)

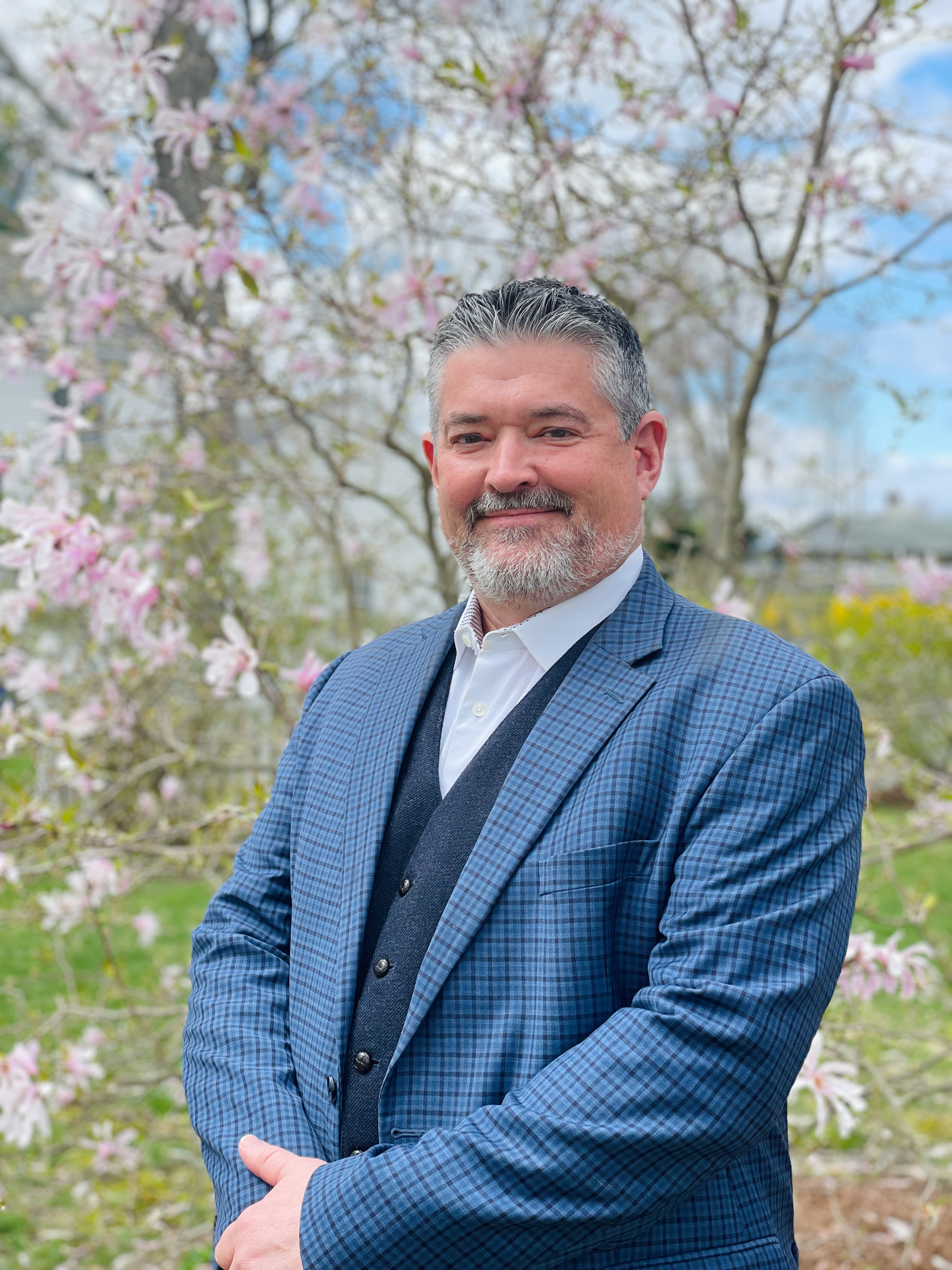
- Matthew Dawson in 2022

Member of the Rhode Island House of Representatives from the 65th district
- Incumbent
- Assumed office January 3, 2023
- Preceded by: Gregg Amore

Personal details
- Born: January 12, 1968 (age 58) Providence, Rhode Island, U.S.
- Party: Democratic
- Spouse: Bethany
- Children: 2
- Education: University of Rhode Island (BA), New England School of Law (JD)

Matthew S. Dawson (born January 12, 1968) is an American attorney and politician. Since January 2023, he has represented East Providence in the Rhode Island House of Representatives serving as a Democrat.

== Early life and education ==
Dawson was born in East Providence on January 12, 1968. He attended East Providence High School and received a degree in journalism and political science from the University of Rhode Island in 1990. He went on to graduate from the New England School of Law in Boston with a juris doctor in 1995.

== Political career ==
Dawson worked for the Rhode Island's Attorney General office as a prosecutor for over 20 years. During his tenure as a prosecutor, he served as both Deputy Chief of the Criminal Division and the Chief of the Narcotics and Organized Crime Unit. Additionally, he was the Attorney General's special liaison to the East Providence Police Department for 16 years.

From 2012 to 2014, Dawson served as a probate judge for the city of East Providence.

=== Rhode Island House of Representatives ===
In 2022, Dawson declared his candidacy for the state's 65th House district. The incumbent, Gregg Amore was running for the state's Secretary of State post. Dawson won the Democratic primary in September, fending off progressive activist and entrepreneur, San Shoppell. In November 2022, Dawson won the general election by a convincing margin against Republican John "Jack" Peters.

Dawson was sworn into the House of Representatives by successor Amore, and was placed on the House Judiciary and the Municipal Government and Housing committees.

== Private sector career ==
Following Dawson's work in the public sector as a prosecutor, he was hired by Lynch & Pine, a Providence-based criminal defense firm. He is currently a member of the Rhode Island Bar Association, the Rhode Island Association of Criminal Defense Attorneys, and the Rhode Island Hospitality Association. In 2019, Dawson was named the Providence Journal's People's Choice Attorney of the Year.

== Personal life ==
Dawson lives in the Riverside neighborhood of East Providence with his wife Bethany, daughters Kelsea and Abby, and a dog named Pippa.

In 2020 Dawson was part of a group that purchased a restaurant in Providence, RI called the Red Door. https://www.providenceonline.com/stories/experience-the-red-door-in-downtown-providence,104554?
