= Jacquelyn Baginski =

American politician

Jackie Baginski

Member of the Rhode Island House of Representatives from the 17th district
- Incumbent
- Assumed office January 5, 2021
- Preceded by: Robert Jacquard

Personal details
- Born: 1985/1986 (age 34/35)
- Party: Democratic

Jacquelyn Baginski (born 1985/1986) is an American politician who serves in the Rhode Island House of Representatives for the 17th district. A member of the Democratic Party, Baginski was first elected in the 2020 elections, succeeding retiring incumbent Robert Jacquard. Before being elected to the state house, Baginski ran a political consulting business, and she is noted for her extensive political ties.
