= Marie Hopkins =

American politician from Rhode Island

Member of the Rhode Island House of Representatives from the 21st district
- Incumbent
- Assumed office January 7, 2025
- Preceded by: Camille Vella-Wilkinson

Personal details
- Party: Republican
- Website: www.marie4ri.com

Marie A. Hopkins is a Republican member of the Rhode Island House of Representatives. She has represented the 21st district since 2025.
