= Deborah Fellela =

American politician

Deborah A. Fellela

Member of the Rhode Island House of Representatives from the 43rd district
- Incumbent
- Assumed office January 2007
- Preceded by: Joseph Voccola

Personal details
- Born: November 16, 1956 (age 69)
- Party: Democratic

Deborah A. Fellela (born November 16, 1956) is an American politician and a Democratic member of the Rhode Island House of Representatives representing District 43 since January 2007. Fellela serves as a Deputy Majority Leader of her caucus. Outside her work in government, Fellela works as the secretary to the principal of Robert F. Kennedy Elementary School.

== Education ==
Fellela graduated from East Providence High School.

== Elections ==
- 2012 Fellela was unopposed for the September 11, 2012 Democratic Primary, winning with 894 votes and won the November 6, 2012 General election with 3,887 votes (64.8%) against returning 2010 Independent challenger Karin Gorman.
- 2006 When District 43 Democratic Representative Joseph Voccola retired and left the seat open, Fellela ran in the September 12, 2006 Democratic Primary, winning with 1,449 votes (52.4%) and was unopposed for the November 7, 2006 General election, winning with 4,822 votes.
- 2008 Fellela was challenged in the September 9, 2008 Democratic Primary, winning with 1,148 votes (58.2%) and won the November 4, 2008 General election with 4,469 votes (73.8%) against Independent candidate Karl Tirrell.
- 2010 Fellela was challenged in the September 23, 2010 Democratic Primary, winning with 1,702 votes (66.2%) and won the November 2, 2010 General election with 2,946 votes (57.7%) against Independent candidate Karin Gorman.
