= June Speakman =

American politician and academic from Rhode Island

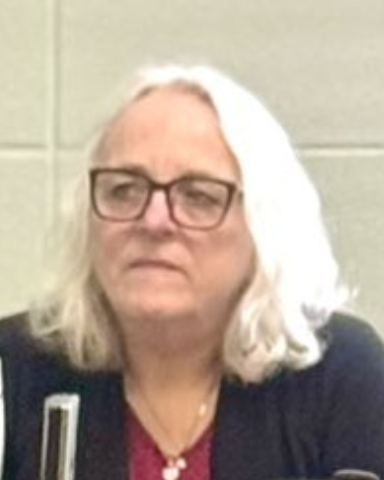

Member of the Rhode Island House of Representatives from the 68th district
- Incumbent
- Assumed office March 13, 2019
- Preceded by: Kenneth Marshall

Personal details
- Party: Democratic

June Speakman is an American politician. She serves as a Democratic member for the 68th district of the Rhode Island House of Representatives.

Speakman works at Roger Williams University as a professor. In 2019, she was elected for the 68th district of the Rhode Island House of Representatives, assuming office on March 13, 2019.
