= Brandon Voas =

American politician

Brandon Voas (born October 4, 1993) is an American politician representing the 57th district in the Rhode Island House of Representatives.

== Career ==
A member of the Democratic Party, he was first elected in November 2022.

Voas graduated from Cumberland High School and the Community College of Rhode Island.
