= George Nardone =

American politician

George A. Nardone

Member of the Rhode Island House of Representatives from the 28th district
- Incumbent
- Assumed office January 1, 2019
- Preceded by: Robert A. Nardolillo

Personal details
- Born: June 13, 1964 (age 62)
- Party: Republican
- Spouse: Dawn Nardone
- Children: 1
- Profession: Upholstery Business Owner
- Website: nardonedistrict28.com

George Nardone (born June 13, 1964) is an American politician and a Republican member of the Rhode Island House of Representatives representing District 28 beginning in 2019. He serves on the House Committees on Corporations, Small Business, Municipal Government, and Special Legislation.

== Education ==
Nardone is a 1982 graduate of Scituate High School.

== Electoral record ==
2024 general election: Rhode Island House of Representatives, District 28
Party	Candidate	Votes	%
Republican	George Nardone	4,589	57.2%
Democratic	Scott Guthrie	3,418	42.6%

2022 general election: Rhode Island House of Representatives, District 28
Party	Candidate	Votes	%
Republican	George Nardone	3,539	58.4%
Democratic	Scott Guthrie	2,510	41.4%

2020 general election: Rhode Island House of Representatives, District 28
Party	Candidate	Votes	%
Republican	George Nardone	4,641	58.4%
Democratic	Scott Guthrie	3,302	41.5%

2018 general election: Rhode Island House of Representatives, District 28
Party	Candidate	Votes	%
Republican	George Nardone	2,916	50.2%
Democratic	Lucas Murray	2,885	49.7%

2018 statewide primary: Rhode Island House of Representatives, District 28
Party	Candidate	Votes	%
Republican	George Nardone	474	65.5%
Republican	Charles Vacca Jr.	250	34.5%

== Personal life ==
Nardone is a resident of Coventry, Rhode Island.
