= Evan Shanley =

American lawyer

Member of the Rhode Island House of Representatives from the 24th district
- Incumbent
- Assumed office January 2017
- Preceded by: Joe Trillo

Personal details
- Born: October 17, 1986 (age 39)
- Party: Democratic
- Children: 1
- Education: Providence College (BA); Catholic University (JD)

Evan P. Shanley (born October 17, 1986) is an American attorney and politician serving as a member of the Rhode Island House of Representatives from the 24th district. Elected in November 2016, he assumed office in January 2017.

== Early life and education ==
Shanley was raised in Warwick, Rhode Island. After graduating from Toll Gate High School, he earned a Bachelor of Arts degree in history from Providence College in 2009 and a Juris Doctor from the Catholic University in 2012.

== Career ==
In 2012, Shanley began his career as an attorney at Blake & Uhlig in Kansas City, Missouri. Since 2013, he has been an attorney at Gursky|Wiens. He was elected to the Rhode Island House of Representatives in November 2016 and assumed office in January 2017. Shanley also served as vice chair of the House Judiciary Committee and chair of the House State Government and Elections Committee. In 2018, Shanley was chair of the Rhode Island Online Data Transparency and Privacy Protection Commission.
