= Patricia Serpa =

American politician

Member of the Rhode Island House of Representatives from the 27th district
- Incumbent
- Assumed office January 2007
- Preceded by: Norman Landroche

Personal details
- Born: July 8, 1948 (age 78)
- Party: Democratic
- Education: Mount Saint Joseph College; Providence College

Patricia A. Serpa (born July 8, 1948) is an American politician and a Democratic member of the Rhode Island House of Representatives representing District 27 since January 2007.

== Education ==
Serpa earned her BEd from Mount Saint Joseph College and her MEd from Providence College.

== Elections ==
- 2012 Serpa was unopposed for the September 11, 2012 Democratic Primary, winning with 816 votes and won the November 6, 2012 General election with 4,142 votes (68.2%) against Republican nominee Kyle Pendola.
- 2006 When District 27 Democratic Representative Norman Landroche left the Legislature and left the seat open, Serpa was unopposed for the September 12, 2006 Democratic Primary, winning with 559 votes and won the November 7, 2006 General election with 3,379 votes (57.7%) against Republican nominee Mark Fleury.
- 2008 Serpa was unopposed for the September 9, 2008 Democratic Primary, winning with 586 votes and won the three-way November 4, 2008 General election with 3,185 votes (53.2%) against Republican nominee Ericka Atwell and Independent candidate David Michael.
- 2010 Serpa and returning 2008 Republican opponent Mark Fleury were both unopposed for their September 23, 2010 primaries, setting up a rematch; Serpa won the three-way November 2, 2010 General election with 2,031 votes (42.9%) against Fleury and Independent candidate Thomas Jones.
