= Joshua Giraldo =

American politician

Member of the Rhode Island House of Representatives from the 56th district
- Incumbent
- Assumed office March 12, 2020
- Preceded by: Shelby Maldonado

Personal details
- Born: Central Falls, Rhode Island, U.S.
- Party: Democratic
- Spouse: Maite Giraldo
- Children: 3
- Education: Roger Williams University; Providence College

Joshua Giraldo is an American politician. He serves as a Democratic member for the 56th district of the Rhode Island House of Representatives.

Giraldo was born in Central Falls, Rhode Island. He attended Roger Williams University and Providence College, where he graduated in 2008. In 2020 Giraldo was elected to the 56th district of the Rhode Island House of Representatives, assuming office on March 12, 2020.
