= Rebecca Kislak =

American politician

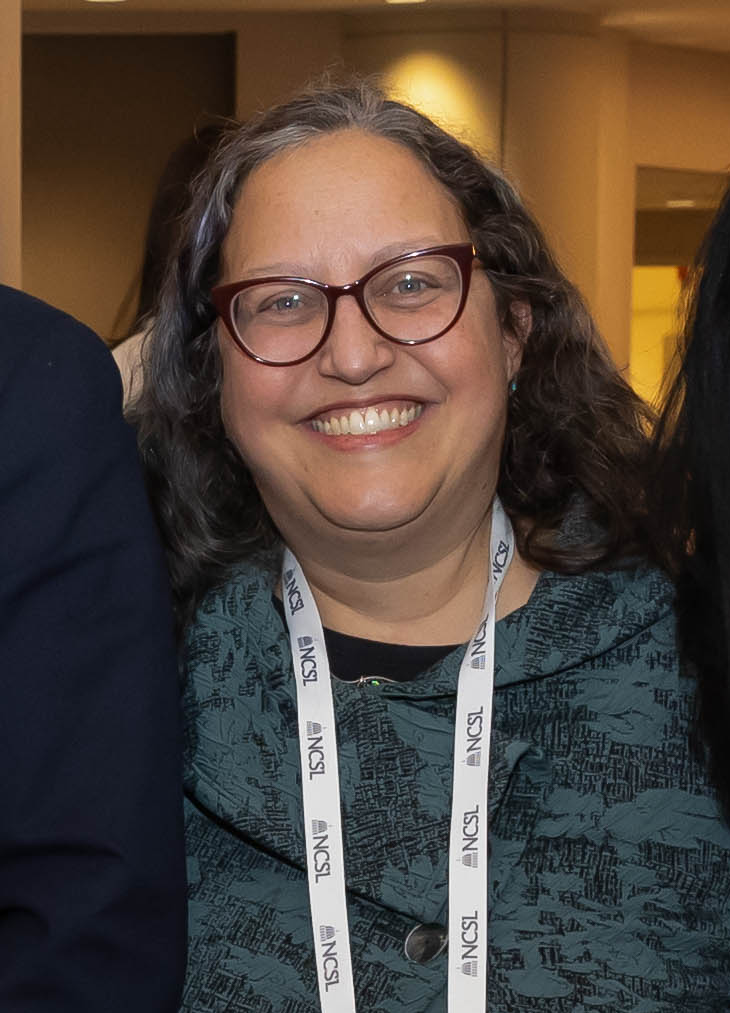
- Rebecca Kislak in 2023

Member of the Rhode Island House of Representatives from the 4th district
- Incumbent
- Assumed office January 1, 2019
- Preceded by: Aaron Regunberg

Personal details
- Born: March 7, 1972 (age 54)
- Party: Democratic
- Spouse: Joanna Brown
- Children: 2
- Education: Brown University (BA); Georgetown University (JD)

Rebecca Kislak (born March 7, 1972) is an American attorney and politician serving as a member of the Rhode Island House of Representatives from the 4th district. Kislak was elected in November 2018 and assumed office on January 1, 2019.

== Education ==
Kislak earned a Bachelor of Arts degree in ancient studies from Brown University and a Juris Doctor from the Georgetown University Law Center.

== Career ==
Prior to serving in the House, Kislak worked as a lawyer in Worcester, Massachusetts and Providence, Rhode Island. Kislak has also worked as an advocate for children's advocate and healthcare policy advisor. Kislak was elected to the Rhode Island House in 2018 and assumed office in 2019. In the 2020 Democratic Party presidential primaries, Kislak endorsed Elizabeth Warren.

== Personal life ==
Kislak and her wife, Joanna Brown, have two children. She is Jewish.
