= Rhode Island House of Representatives =

Lower house of the Rhode Island General Assembly

Coordinates: 41.8310574°N 71.4171443°W

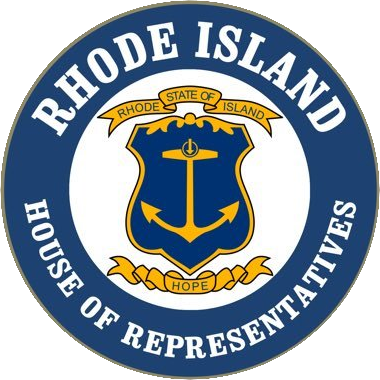
- Seal of the Rhode Island House of Representatives

Type
- Type: Lower house of the Rhode Island General Assembly
- Term limits: None

History
- New session started: January 7, 2025

Leadership
- Speaker: Chris Blazejweski (D) since May 7, 2026
- Speaker pro tempore: Brian Kennedy (D) since January 12, 2017
- Majority Leader: Katherine Kazarian (D) since May 7, 2026
- Minority Leader: Michael Chippendale (R) since June 23, 2022

Structure
- Seats: 75
- Political groups: Majority (64): Democratic (64); Minority (11): Republican (10); Independent (1)
- Length of term: 2 years
- Authority: Article VI, Constitution of Rhode Island
- Salary: Representative: $19,036/year

Elections
- Voting system: First-past-the-post
- Last election: November 5, 2024
- Next election: November 3, 2026
- Redistricting: Legislative Control

Meeting place
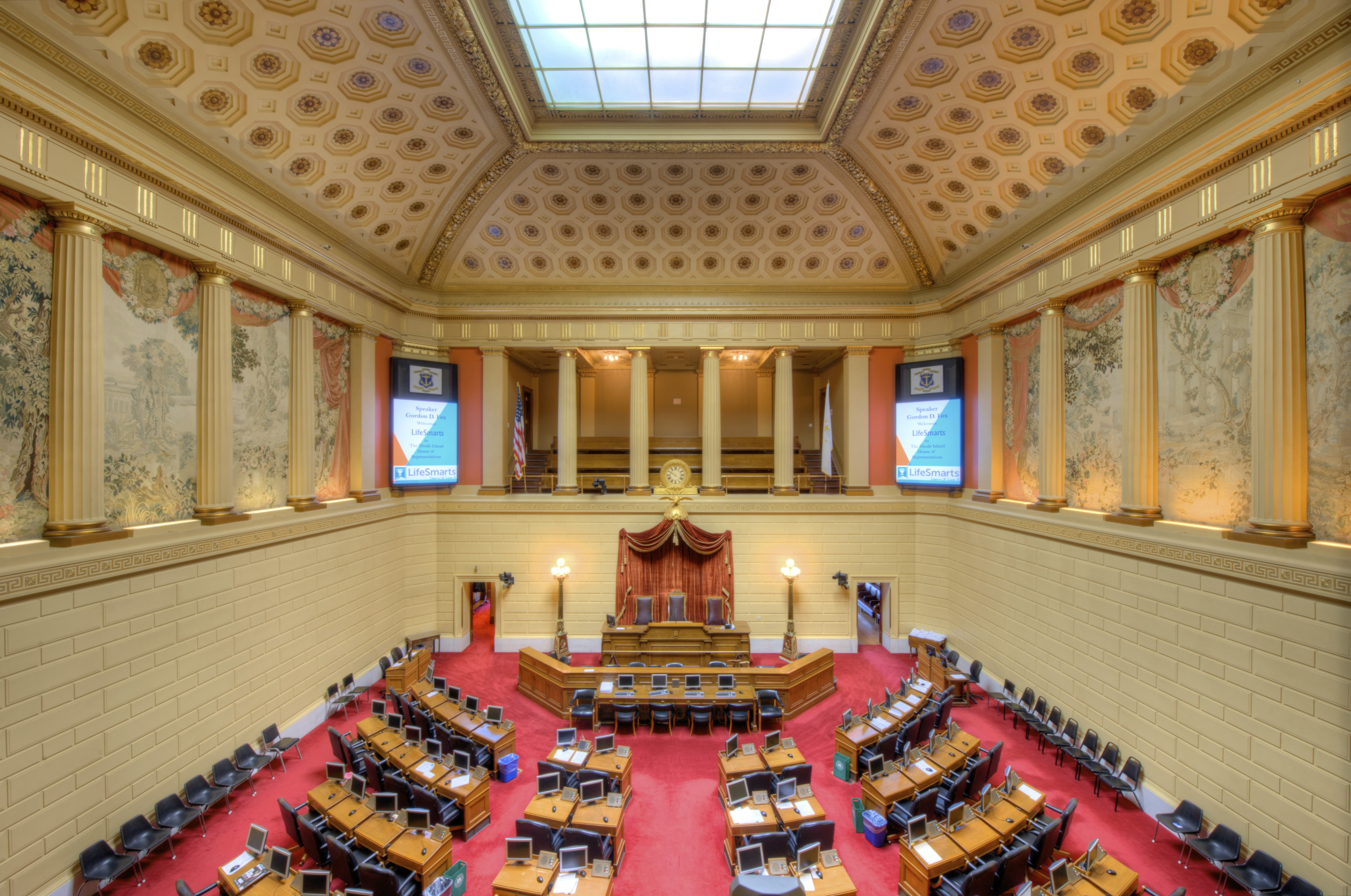
- House of Representatives Chamber; Rhode Island State Capitol; Providence, Rhode Island

Website
- Rhode Island House of Representatives

The Rhode Island House of Representatives is the lower house of the Rhode Island General Assembly, the state legislature of the U.S. state of Rhode Island, the upper house being the Rhode Island Senate. It is composed of 75 members, elected to two-year terms from 75 districts of equal population. The Rhode Island General Assembly does not have term limits. The House meets at the Rhode Island State Capitol in Providence.

== House leadership ==
The Speaker of the House presides over the House of Representatives. The Speaker is elected by the majority party caucus followed by confirmation of the full House through the passage of a House Resolution. As well as presiding over the body, the Speaker is also the chief leadership position, and controls the flow of legislation. Other House leaders, such as the majority and minority leaders, are elected by their respective party caucuses relative to their party's strength in the chamber.

=== Officers ===
Position	Representative	Party	District
Speaker of the House	Christopher Blazejewski	Dem	2
Majority Leader	Katherine Kazarian	Dem	63
Majority Whip	Vacant	Dem	N/A
Deputy Speaker	Raymond Hull	Dem	6
Deputy Majority Whip	Mia Ackerman	Dem	45
Majority Caucus Chair	Grace Diaz	Dem	11
Speaker Pro Tempore	Brian Patrick Kennedy	Dem	38
Majority Floor Manager	Jay Edwards	Dem	70
Minority Leader	Michael Chippendale	Rep	40
Minority Whip	David Place	Rep	47
Senior Deputy Minority Leader	Sherry Roberts	Rep	29

== Committee leadership ==
Committee	Chair
Conduct	Justine Caldwell (D)
Corporations	Joseph J. Solomon Jr. (D)
Education	Joseph McNamara (D)
Environment and Natural Resources	David Bennett (D)
Finance	Marvin Abney (D)
Health and Human Services	Susan Donovan (D)
Innovation and Technology	Jacquelyn Baginski (D)
Judiciary	Robert Craven (D)
Labor	Arthur Corvese (D)
Municipal Government and Housing	Stephen Casey (D)
Oversight	Patricia Serpa (D)
Rules	Kathleen Fogarty (D)
Small Business	Carol McEntee (D)
Special Legislation	Karen Alzate (D)
State Government and Elections	Evan Shanley (D)
Veterans' Affairs	Samuel Azzinaro (D)

== Composition ==
Affiliation	Party (Shading indicates majority caucus)			Total	Vacant
Affiliation	Democratic	Republican	Independent	Total	Vacant
End of 2014 session	69	6	0	75	0
Beginning of 2015 session	63	11	1	75	0
End of 2016 session	62	12	1	75	0
2017-2018 (Note: Rep. Blake Filippi switched parties from Independent to Republican before the start of session.)	64	11	0	75	0
Beginning of 2019 session	66	9	0	75	0
June 23, 2020 (Note: John Lyle Jr. left the Republican Party and became an independent.)	66	8	1	75	0
Beginning of 2021 session	65	10	0	75	0
Beginning of 2023 session	65	9	1	75	0
Beginning of 2025 session	64	10	1	75	0
Latest voting share	85.3%	13.3%	1.3%		

=== Members of the Rhode Island House of Representatives ===
This list is of members elected in November 2024, to serve in the 2025–26 biennium.

District	Representative	Party	Communities in District	Start
1	Edith Ajello	Dem	Providence	1992
2	Chris Blazejewski	Dem	Providence	2010
3	Nathan Biah	Dem	Providence	2020
4	Rebecca Kislak	Dem	Providence	2018
5	Anthony DeSimone	Dem	Providence	2022
6	Raymond Hull	Dem	Providence	2010
7	David Morales	Dem	Providence	2020
8	John J. Lombardi	Dem	Providence	2012
9	Enrique Sanchez	Dem	Providence	2022
10	Scott A. Slater	Dem	Providence	2009
11	Grace Diaz	Dem	Providence	2004
12	Jose Batista	Dem	Providence	2020
13	Ramon Perez (Note: Perez previously served in the state house from 2016–2018.)	Dem	Providence, Johnston	2020
14	Charlene Lima	Dem	Cranston	1992
15	Christopher Paplauskas	Rep	Cranston	2024
16	Brandon Potter	Dem	Cranston	2020
17	Jacquelyn Baginski	Dem	Cranston	2020
18	Arthur Handy	Dem	Cranston	2002
19	Joseph McNamara	Dem	Warwick	1992
20	David Bennett	Dem	Warwick	2010
21	Marie Hopkins	Rep	Warwick	2024
22	Joseph J. Solomon Jr.	Dem	Warwick	2014
23	Joe Shekarchi	Dem	Warwick	2012
24	Evan Shanley	Dem	Warwick	2016
25	Thomas Noret	Dem	Coventry	2018
26	Earl Read III	Dem	West Warwick	2024
27	Patricia Serpa	Dem	West Warwick	2006
28	George Nardone	Rep	Coventry	2018
29	Sherry Roberts	Rep	Coventry	2014
30	Justine Caldwell	Dem	East Greenwich	2018
31	Vacant (Note: Julie Casimiro resigned on August 31, 2026)		North Kingstown, Exeter	
32	Robert Craven	Dem	North Kingstown	2012
33	Carol McEntee	Dem	Narragansett, South Kingstown	2015
34	Teresa Tanzi	Dem	Narragansett, South Kingstown	2010
35	Kathleen A. Fogarty	Dem	South Kingstown	2014
36	Tina Spears	Dem	Charlestown, New Shoreham, South Kingstown, Westerly	2022
37	Samuel Azzinaro	Dem	Westerly	2008
38	Brian Kennedy	Dem	Westerly, Hopkinton	1988
39	Megan Cotter	Dem	Richmond, Exeter, Hopkinton	2022
40	Michael Chippendale	Rep	Coventry, Foster, Glocester	2010
41	Robert Quattrocchi	Rep	Scituate	2016
42	Richard Fascia	Rep	Johnston	2024
43	Deborah Fellela	Dem	Johnston	2006
44	Gregory Costantino	Dem	Lincoln	2012
45	Mia Ackerman	Dem	Cumberland, Lincoln	2012
46	Mary Ann Shallcross Smith (Note: Shallcross Smith previously served in the state house from 2008–2010.)	Dem	Lincoln	2020
47	David J. Place	Rep	Burrillville, Glocester	2018
48	Brian Newberry	Rep	North Smithfield	2008
49	Jon D. Brien (Note: Brien previously served in the state house from 2007–2012.)	Ind	Woonsocket	2022
50	Stephen Casey	Dem	Woonsocket	2012
51	Robert Phillips	Dem	Woonsocket	2010
52	Alex Marszalkowski	Dem	Cumberland	2016
53	Paul Santucci	Rep	Smithfield	2024
54	William O'Brien	Dem	North Providence	2012
55	Arthur Corvese	Dem	North Providence	1998
56	Joshua Giraldo	Dem	Central Falls	2020
57	Brandon Voas	Dem	Central Falls	2022
58	Cherie Cruz	Dem	Pawtucket	2022
59	Jennifer Stewart	Dem	Pawtucket	2022
60	Karen Alzate	Dem	Pawtucket	2018
61	Leonela Felix	Dem	Pawtucket	2020
62	Mary Messier	Dem	Pawtucket	2009
63	Katie Kazarian	Dem	East Providence	2012
64	Jenni Furtado	Dem	East Providence	2024
65	Matthew Dawson	Dem	East Providence	2022
66	Jennifer Boylan	Dem	Barrington, East Providence	2022
67	Jason Knight	Dem	Warren	2016
68	June Speakman	Dem	Warren	2019
69	Susan R. Donovan	Dem	Bristol	2016
70	John Edwards	Dem	Tiverton	2008
71	Michelle McGaw	Dem	Portsmouth, Tiverton, Little Compton	2020
72	Terri-Denise Cortvriend	Dem	Middletown, Portsmouth	2018
73	Marvin Abney	Dem	Middletown, Newport	2012
74	Alex Finkelman	Dem	Jamestown, Middletown	2022
75	Lauren H. Carson	Dem	Newport	2014

== See also ==
- Rhode Island State House
- Rhode Island General Assembly
- Rhode Island Senate
- List of Rhode Island General Assemblies
