= Pawtucket Elks Lodge Building =

- U.S. National Register of Historic Places
- U.S. Historic district – Contributing property
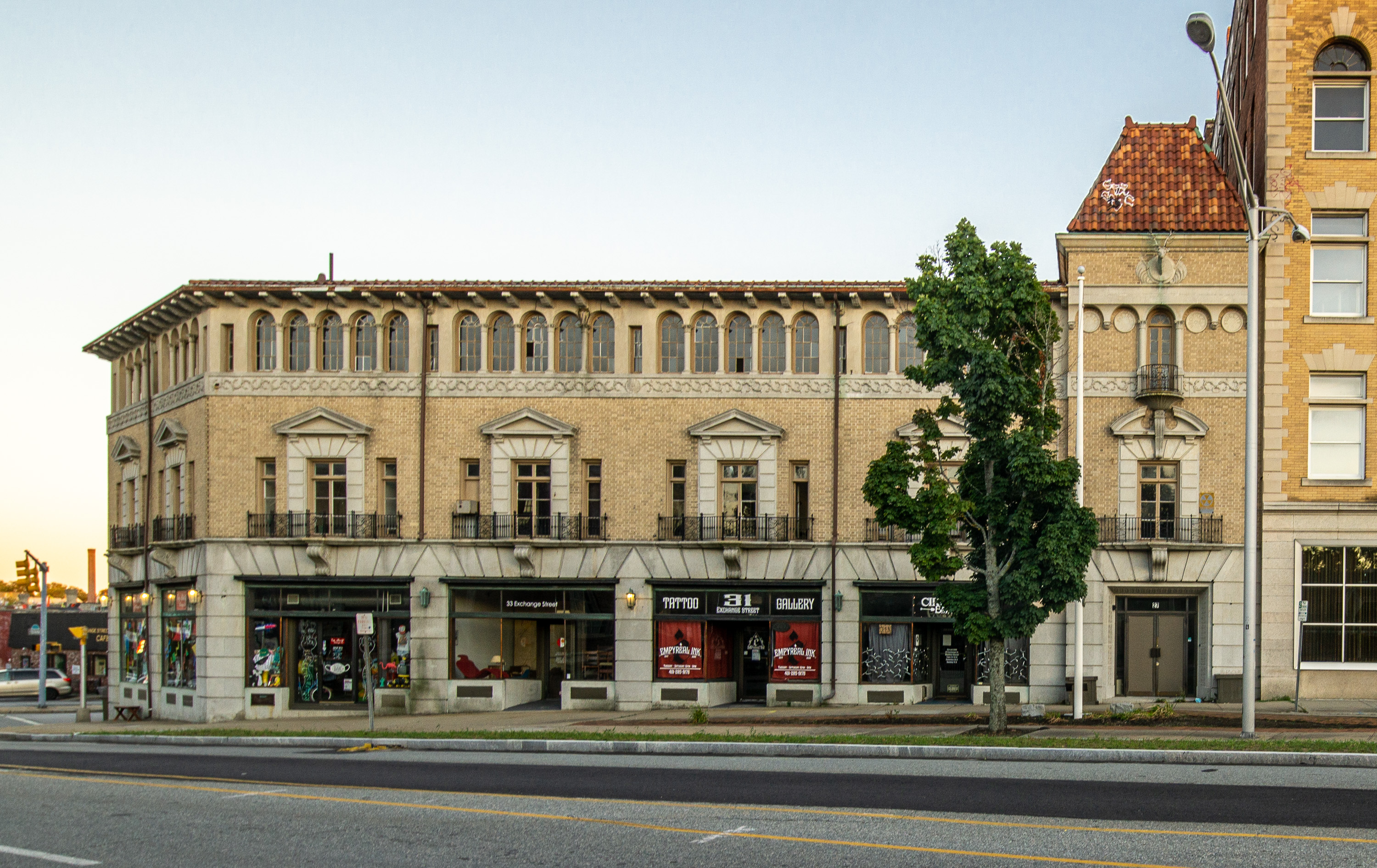

- Location within Rhode Island Location within the United States
- Location: Pawtucket, Rhode Island
- Coordinates: 41°52′46″N 71°23′10″W
- Built: 1926
- Architect: O'Malley-Fitzsimmons
- Architectural style: Mission/Spanish Revival
- Part of: Downtown Pawtucket Historic District (ID06001227)
- MPS: Pawtucket MRA
- NRHP reference No.: 83003840

Significant dates
- Added to NRHP: November 18, 1983
- Designated CP: April 5, 2007

The Pawtucket Elks Lodge Building is an historic site at 27 Exchange Street in the historic central business district of Pawtucket, Rhode Island. The Mission/Spanish Revival building was designed by the O'Malley-Fitzsimmons Company and constructed in 1926. It is three stories in height, with its facade faced in buff brick, laid in Flemish bond, and trimmed in cast stone. Unusual for Elks lodges of the time, the building's first floor was devoted to commercial tenants, with the upper floors devoted to Elks facilities.

The building was listed on the National Register of Historic Places in 1983.

== See also ==
- National Register of Historic Places listings in Pawtucket, Rhode Island
