= Prospect Heights Housing Project =

Historic district in Rhode Island, United States

- U.S. National Register of Historic Places
- U.S. Historic district
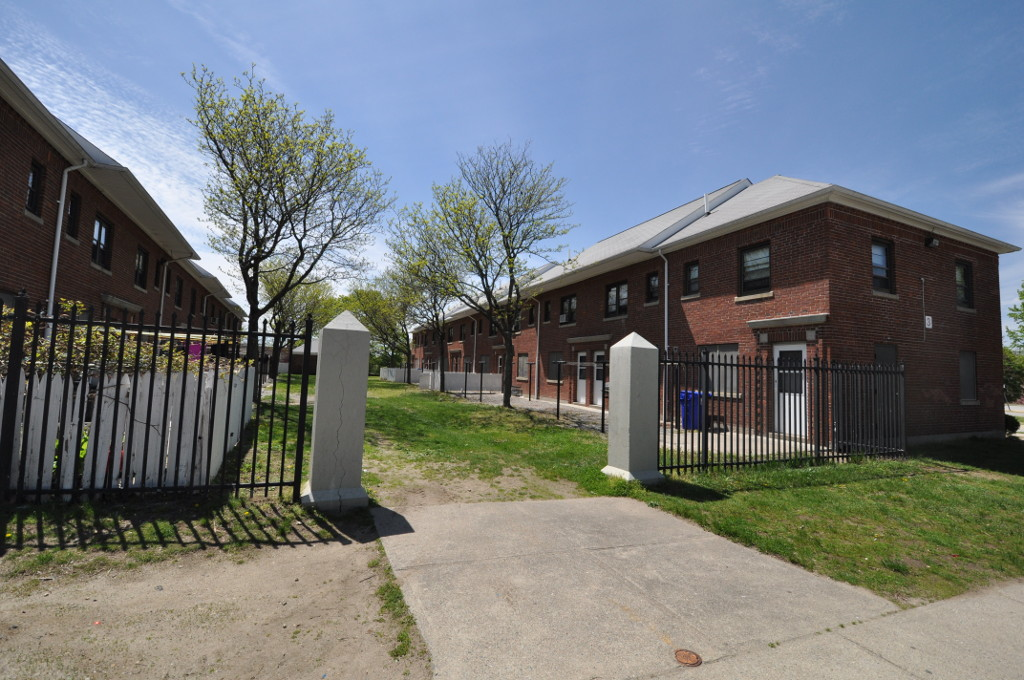

- Location within Rhode Island Location within the United States
- Location: 560 Prospect St., Pawtucket, Rhode Island
- Coordinates: 41°51′41″N 71°22′1″W
- Area: 21 acres (8.5 ha)
- Built: 1941
- Architect: John F. O'Malley
- Architectural style: Modern
- MPS: Pawtucket MRA
- NRHP reference No.: 84002041
- Added to NRHP: December 15, 2015

The Prospect Heights Housing Project is a historic public housing complex at 560 Prospect Street in Pawtucket, Rhode Island. The project consists of 35 brick-faced two-story rowhouses, each containing between 6 and 10 units, and a single-story brick administration building, set on 21 acres (8.5 ha) in the southern part of the city. The complex was developed in 1941–42, with funding assistance from the United States Housing Authority, a New Deal-era housing initiative of the federal government. It is the one of two complexes of this type in the city, and has only seen relatively minor alterations.

The complex was listed on the National Register of Historic Places in 2015.

== See also ==
- National Register of Historic Places listings in Pawtucket, Rhode Island
