= John F. O'Malley =

American architect

- Born: 1885
- Died: c. 1950
- Occupation: Architect

John F. O'Malley (1885 – c. 1950) was an American architect from Rhode Island.

== Life and career ==
John F. O'Malley was born in 1885. His training is unknown, but he opened his office at 75 Westminster Street in Providence around 1910. In 1915 he was briefly associated with Harry A. Lewis, who would later open an office in the same building. In 1919, he moved his office to Pawtucket's Fanning Building, which he had designed several years prior. At this time he also moved his family to Central Falls. From 1923 until 1931, he was associated with Frank E. Fitzsimmons in the firm of the O'Malley-Fitzsimmons Company. From then until the end of his career, O'Malley practiced alone. He died circa 1950.

As a major associate of Pawtucket mayor Thomas P. McCoy, O'Malley designed many of Pawtucket's civic buildings of the 1930s, including City Hall. Several of his later works are listed on the U.S. National Register of Historic Places.

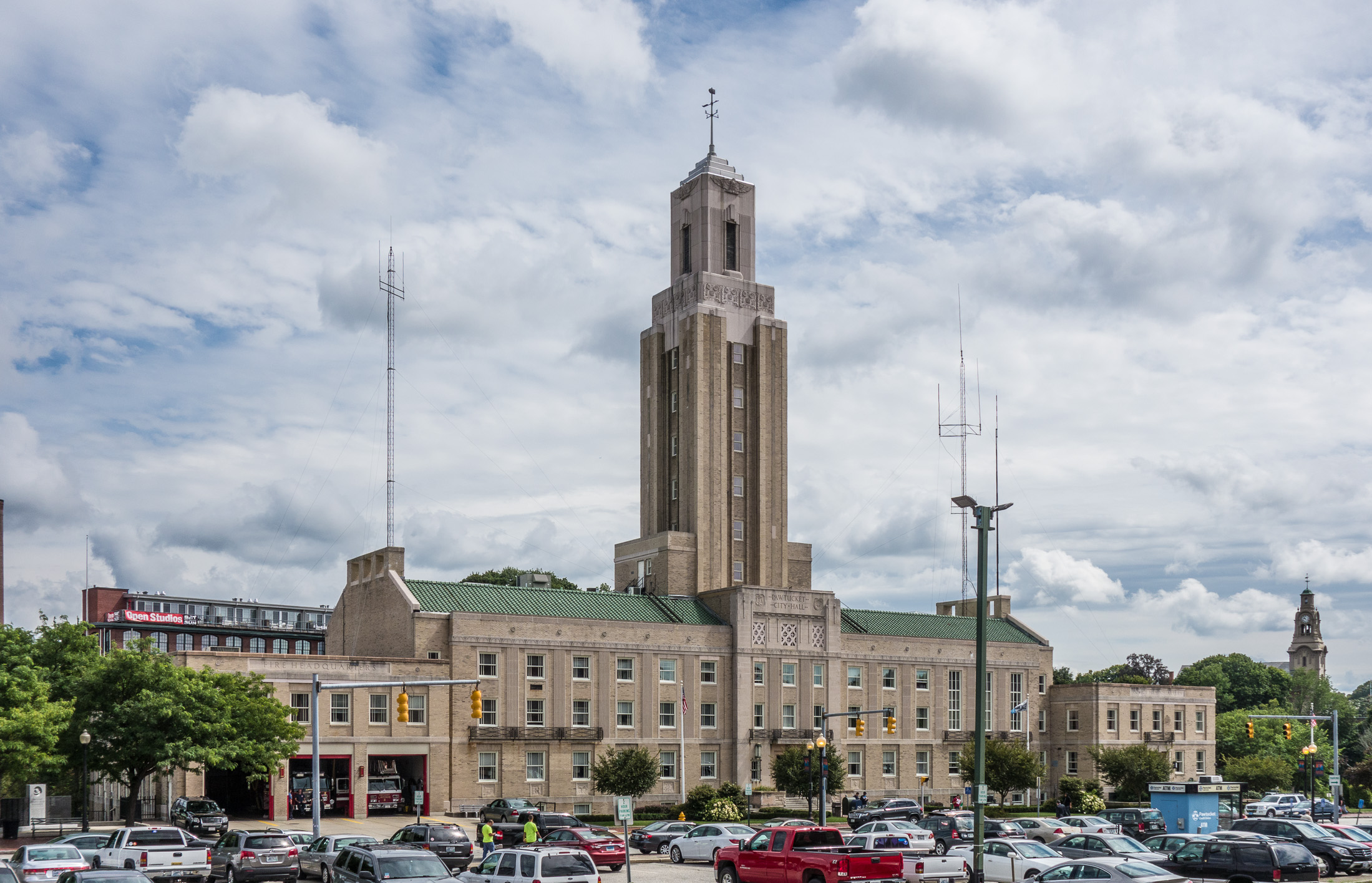
Pawtucket City Hall, Pawtucket, 1935

== Architectural works ==
=== John F. O'Malley, c. 1910 – 1923 ===
- 1910 - Thomas A. O'Gorman Duplexes, 400-402 and 404-408 Lloyd Ave, Providence, Rhode Island
- 1913 - Sherbrook Apartments, 103-107 Broadway, Providence, Rhode Island
  - Demolished.
- 1914 - The Elmgrove, 152 Elmgrove Ave, Providence, Rhode Island
- 1914 - Fanning Building, 84 Broad St, Pawtucket, Rhode Island
  - Demolished.
- 1914 - Mrs. Allen Russell House, 36 Whitford Ave, Providence, Rhode Island
- 1914 - St. Brigid R. C. Church, 1231 Plainfield St, Thornton, Rhode Island
- 1915 - Casino, Rhodes-on-the Pawtuxet, 60 Rhodes Pl, Cranston, Rhode Island
  - In association with Harry A. Lewis.
- 1915 - Thomas F. Moran House, 317-319 Wayland Ave, Providence, Rhode Island
- 1915 - John J. Rosenfeld House, 437 Rochambeau Ave, Providence, Rhode Island
- 1915 - Albert E. Schiller Building, 466 Broad St, Central Falls, Rhode Island
- 1915 - Shea's Theatre, 334 Broad St, Valley Falls, Rhode Island
  - Demolished.
- 1915 - St. Anthony R. C. School, 240 Laban St, Providence, Rhode Island
- 1915 - St. Francis Xavier R. C. Church, 81 N Carpenter St, East Providence, Rhode Island
- 1915 - St. Joseph R. C. Church, 391 High St, Central Falls, Rhode Island
- 1916 - Edward J. McCaughey House, 51 Arlington St, Pawtucket, Rhode Island
- 1916 - National Athletic Club / Marieville Gardens, 1029 Charles Street, North Providence, Rhode Island
- 1916 - St. Ann R. C. School, 525 Branch Ave, Providence, Rhode Island
  - Demolished.
- 1919 - Lincoln Memorial School (former), 1624 Lonsdale Ave, Lonsdale, Rhode Island
- 1921 - Leroy Theatre, 66 Broad St, Pawtucket, Rhode Island
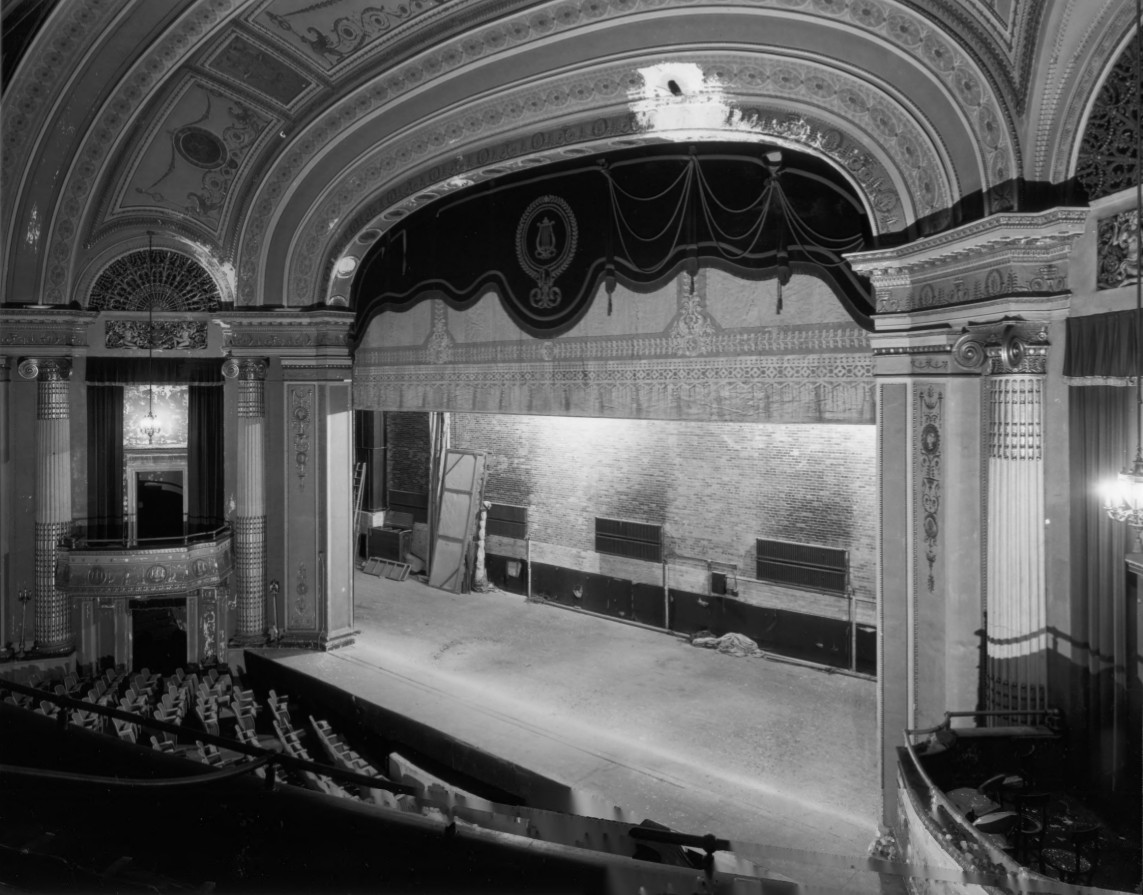
  Leroy Theatre, Pawtucket, 1921-1996
  - Demolished in 1996.
- 1922 - St. Edward R. C. School, 61 Hope St, Pawtucket, Rhode Island
- 1923 - Pearlman Apartments, 150-154 Camp St, Providence, Rhode Island

=== O'Malley-Fitzsimmons Company, 1923–1931 ===
- 1925 - McCormick Apartments, 213 Walcott St, Pawtucket, Rhode Island
- 1925 - Our Lady of Mt. Carmel R. C. Church, 12 Spruce St, Providence, Rhode Island
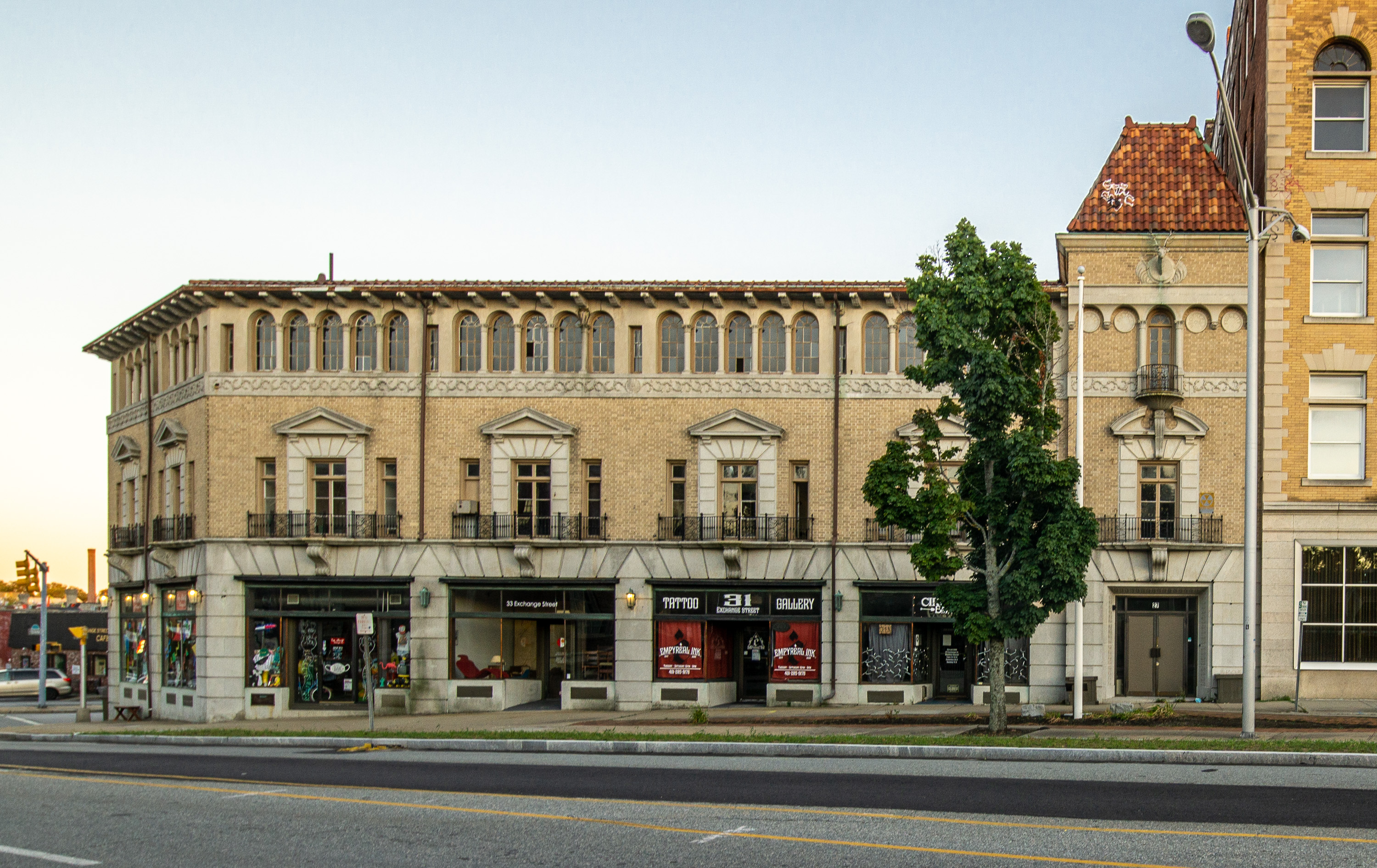
- Elks Building, Pawtucket, 1926
  1926 - Elks Building, 27 Exchange St, Pawtucket, Rhode Island
- 1929 - Rectory for Holy Name R. C. Church, 99 Camp St, Providence, Rhode Island

=== John F. O'Malley, after 1931 ===
- 1931 - Fergus J. McOsker House, 612 Elmgrove Ave, Providence, Rhode Island
- 1933 - Pawtucket City Hall, 137 Roosevelt Ave, Pawtucket, Rhode Island
  - With William G. Richards of Providence.
- 1937 - Pawtucket West High School, 485 East Ave, Pawtucket, Rhode Island
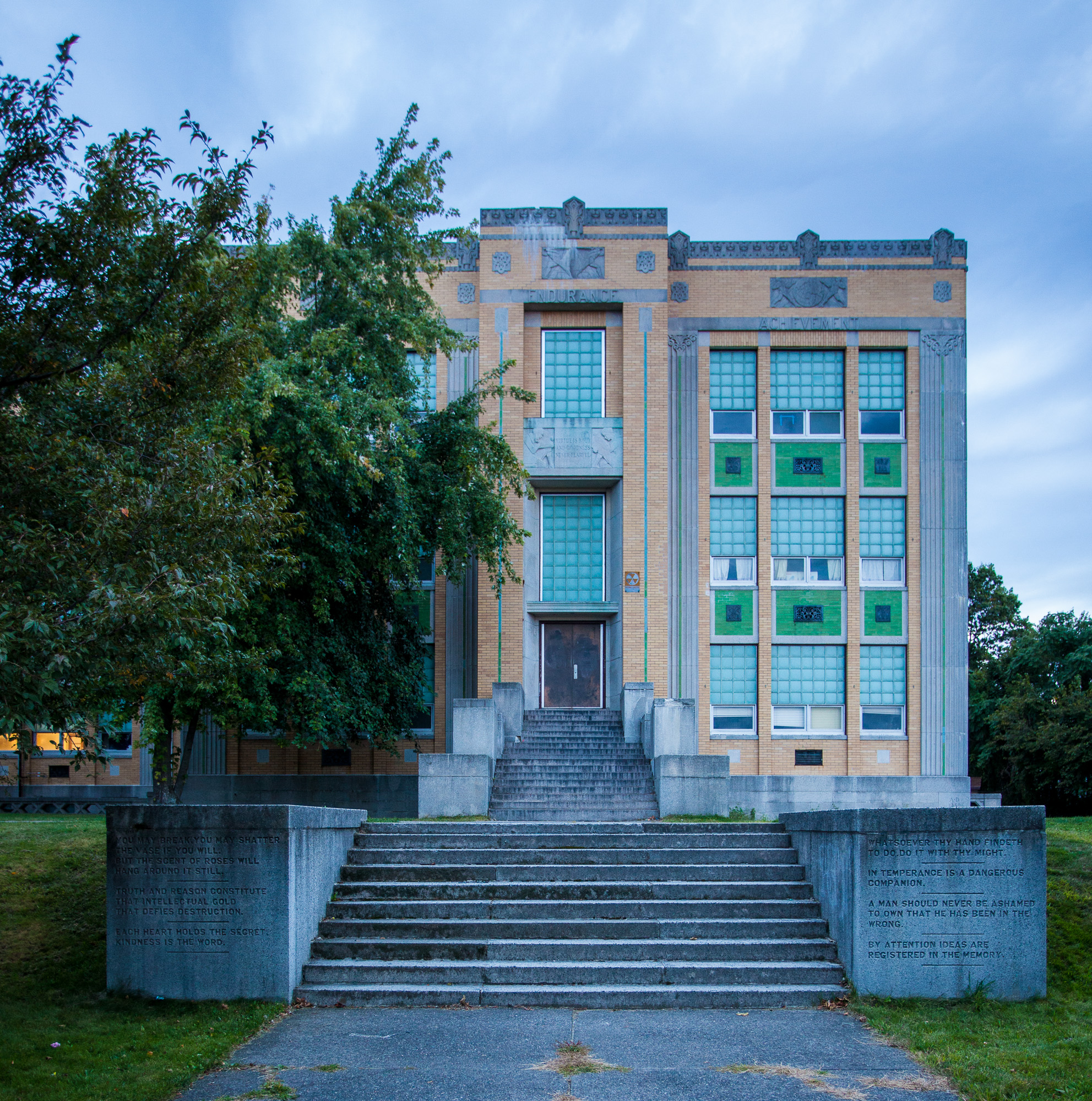
  West High School, Pawtucket, 1937
- 1939 - Holy Name R. C. School, 55 Locust St, Providence, Rhode Island
- 1940 - Prospect Heights, 560 Prospect St, Pawtucket, Rhode Island
