= Pawtucket City Hall =

- U.S. National Register of Historic Places
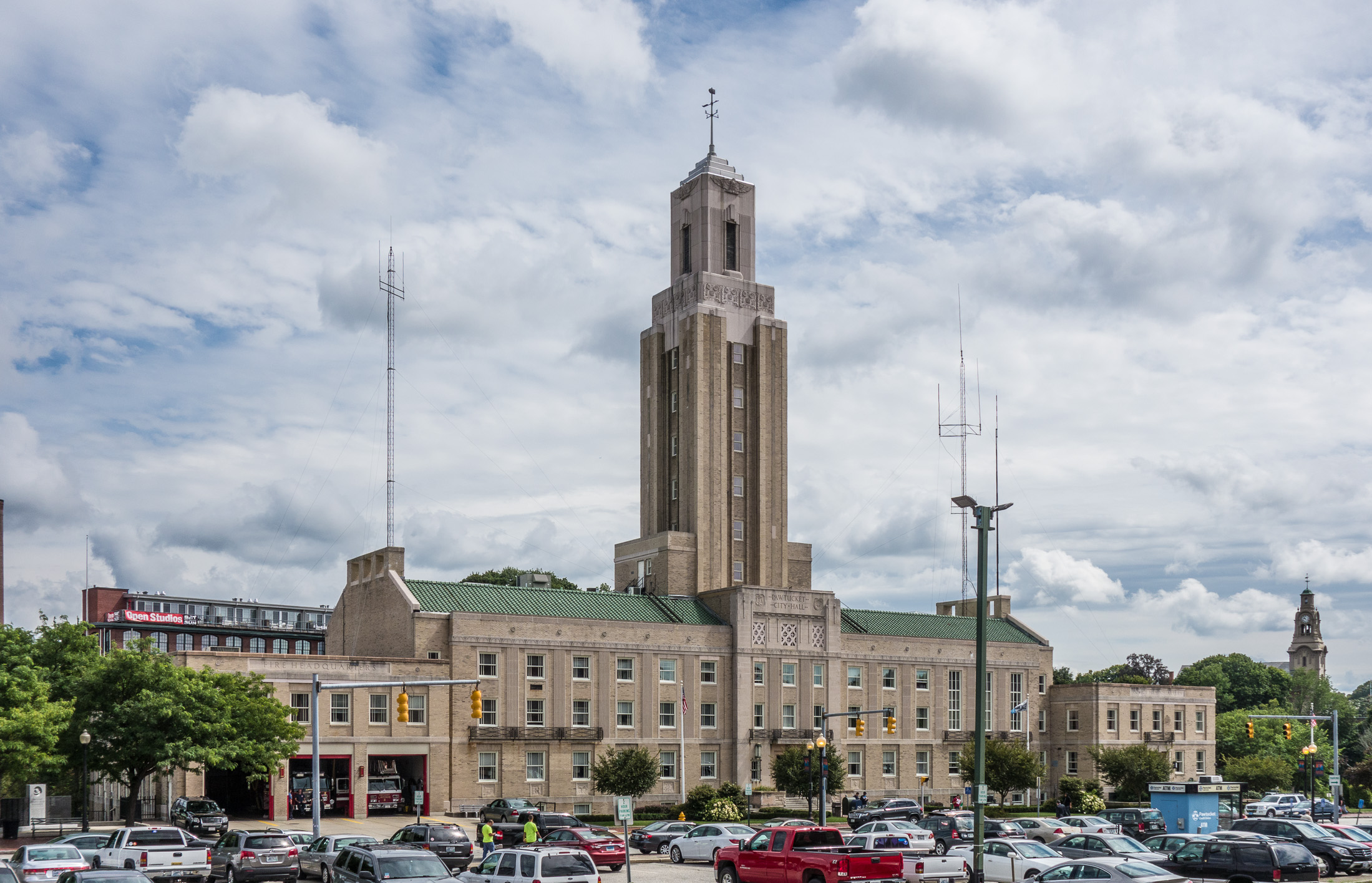
- Pawtucket City Hall in 2013 from the parking lot across the street

- Location within Rhode Island Location within the United States
- Location: Pawtucket, Rhode Island, US
- Coordinates: 41°52′45″N 71°22′57″W
- Built: 1933–1936
- Architect: O'Malley, John F.
- Architectural style: Art Deco
- MPS: Pawtucket MRA
- NRHP reference No.: 83003838
- Added to NRHP: November 18, 1983

Pawtucket City Hall is located at 137 Roosevelt Avenue, just outside the central business district of Pawtucket, Rhode Island. The Art Deco-style building was designed by Providence architect John O'Malley and was built in 1933–1936, its cost subsidized by funds from the Works Progress Administration.

== Building description ==
Pawtucket City Hall has a large central entrance block, faced in limestone. three bays wide and three stories high, with an attic story fenestrated with three screened windows, and above that, a panel inscribed, “Pawtucket City Hall.” The central section is surmounted by a tower faced in brick and stone, which rises to a height of 209 feet (64 m) above grade. The design of the central wing and tower derives, whether consciously or not, from the Nebraska State Capitol, an influential building, designed by architect Bertram Goodhue in 1920, and completed in 1932.

The main block is flanked by two wings, faced in brick, with pitched roofs, each six bays wide and three stories high (plus a basement level), which house the Pawtucket City Hall offices. The two principal wings each extend to secondary projecting wings that are two stories high, faced in brick, with flat roofs giving them a more utilitarian character. The north wing houses the central fire station, while the south wing houses the police department headquarters.

The building was added to the National Register of Historic Places in 1983. In 1999, it made a brief appearance in the movie Outside Providence.

== Gallery ==
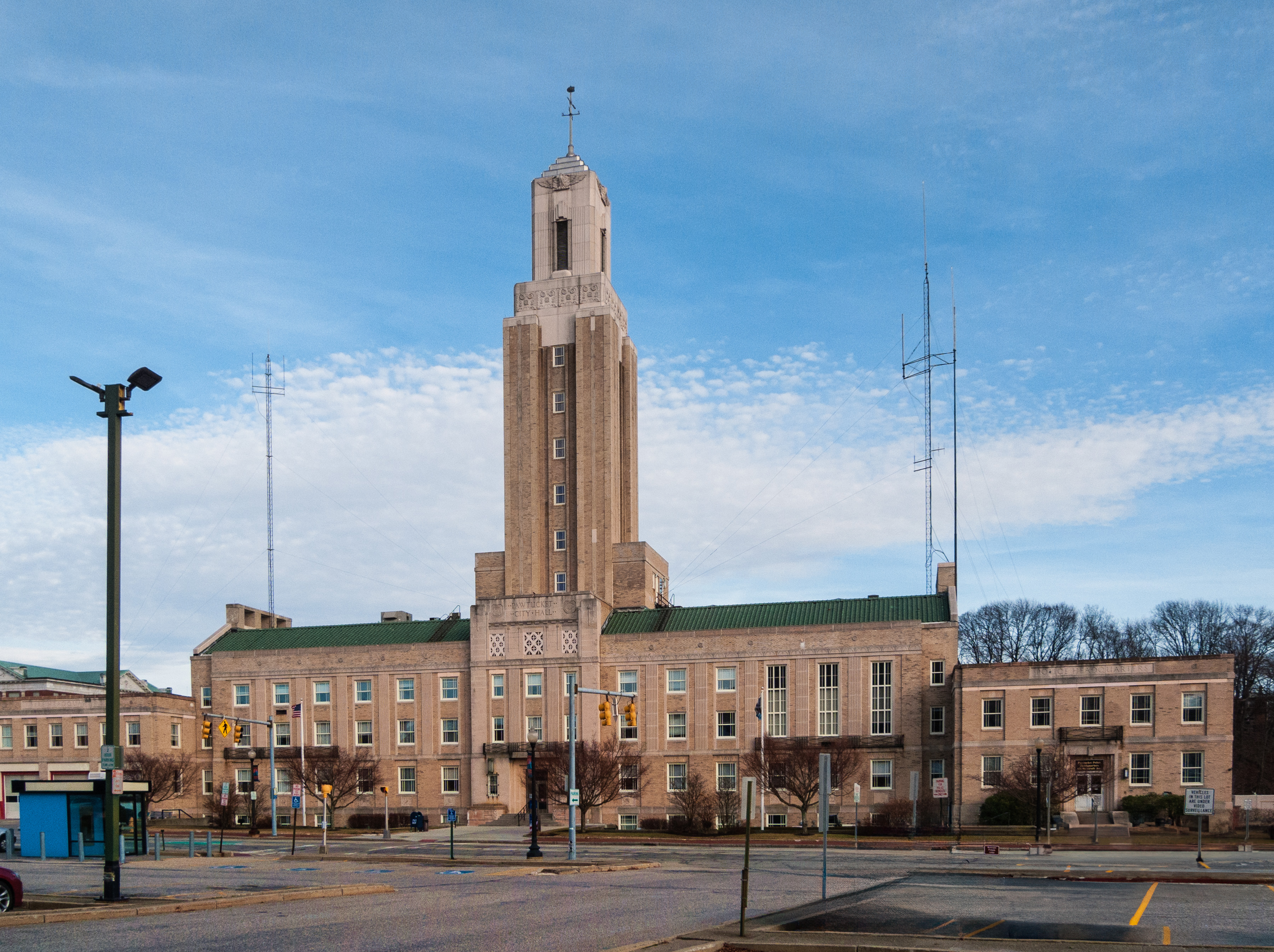

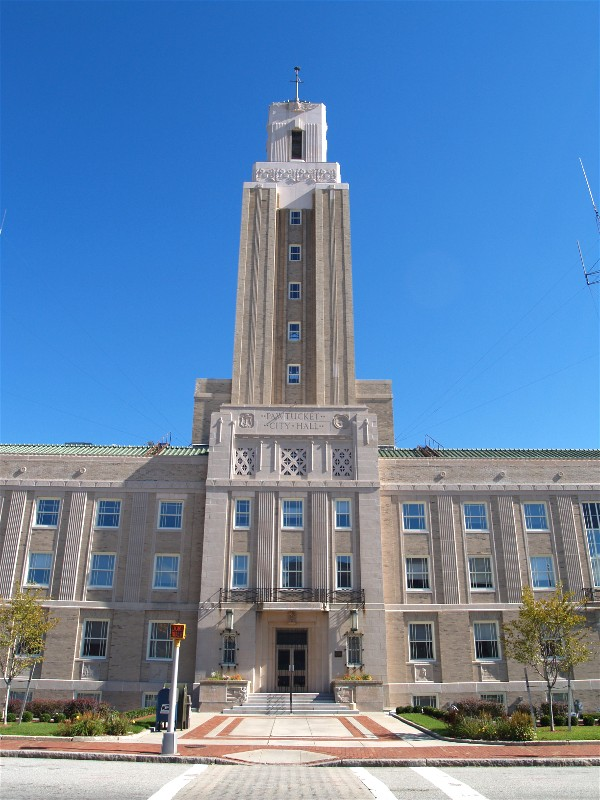

== See also ==
- National Register of Historic Places listings in Pawtucket, Rhode Island
- List of mayors of Pawtucket, Rhode Island
