= Leroy Theatre =

- U.S. National Register of Historic Places
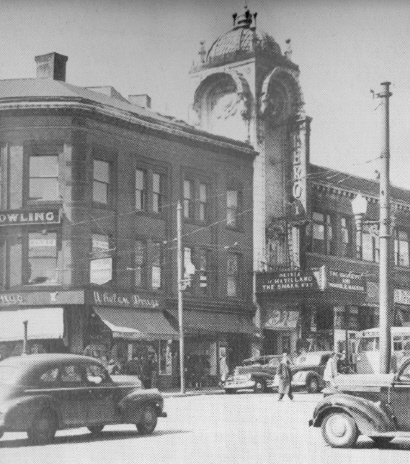

- Location within Rhode Island Location within the United States
- Location: 66 Broad Street, Pawtucket, Rhode Island
- Coordinates: 41°52′48″N 71°23′15″W
- Built: 1922
- Architect: John F. O'Malley
- Architectural style: Classical Revival
- Demolished: 1997
- NRHP reference No.: 83000181
- Added to NRHP: August 4, 1983

Leroy Theatre was a historic movie palace in Pawtucket, Rhode Island. It was built in 1922, listed on the National Register in 1983, and demolished in 1997.

== The building ==
The Leroy was one of the finest and largest theatres of the period in all of New England, built when Pawtucket was at its economic height. It was one of the finest buildings in a city already brimming with distinguished architecture. The lobby featured a large fireplace, a grand staircase, and a frieze of golden vases. The interior had seats for 2,700 people, and included extensive ornamentation such as mirrors, colored lights, brass rails, and gold leaf. It had a mirrored lobby, an electric chandelier with 4,700 bulbs, and the largest Wurlitzer organ in New England. Above the balcony was a dome filled with classical sculpted figures.

== History ==
The theatre was designed by architect John F. O'Malley and was built in 1922 for client Charles Payne, a power company executive. Payne spared no expense on the building, named in honor of Payne's son Leroy, who had been killed in World War I.

The theatre opened in May 1923. Charles Payne died four years later, on January 5, 1927, at age 59.

At the time of the Leroy's construction, Pawtucket was a prosperous mill town. In addition to the Leroy, it boasted a half-dozen theatres and two dozen hotels. Of these, the Leroy was considered the town's "most lavish public building", and was referred to as Pawtucket's Million Dollar Theatre.

The Leroy hosted vaudeville acts, silent (and then sound) movies, and all manner of theatrical productions and musical performances. However, by the late 1960s, the once-wealthy mill town had fallen into decline, and moviegoers had begun to prefer suburban multiplexes to the old downtown movie palaces.

The theatre was closed in 1963, briefly reopened in 1976, and was again shuttered. It was listed on the National Register of Historic Places in 1983.

A ballet company briefly attempted to use the theatre in 1984, and it was operated as a concert hall from 1985 to 1990. In April 1997 the building was sold to a Boston developer and demolished later that year, along with three neighboring buildings, to build a Walgreens drugstore.

== See also ==
- National Register of Historic Places listings in Pawtucket, Rhode Island
