= Shea High School =

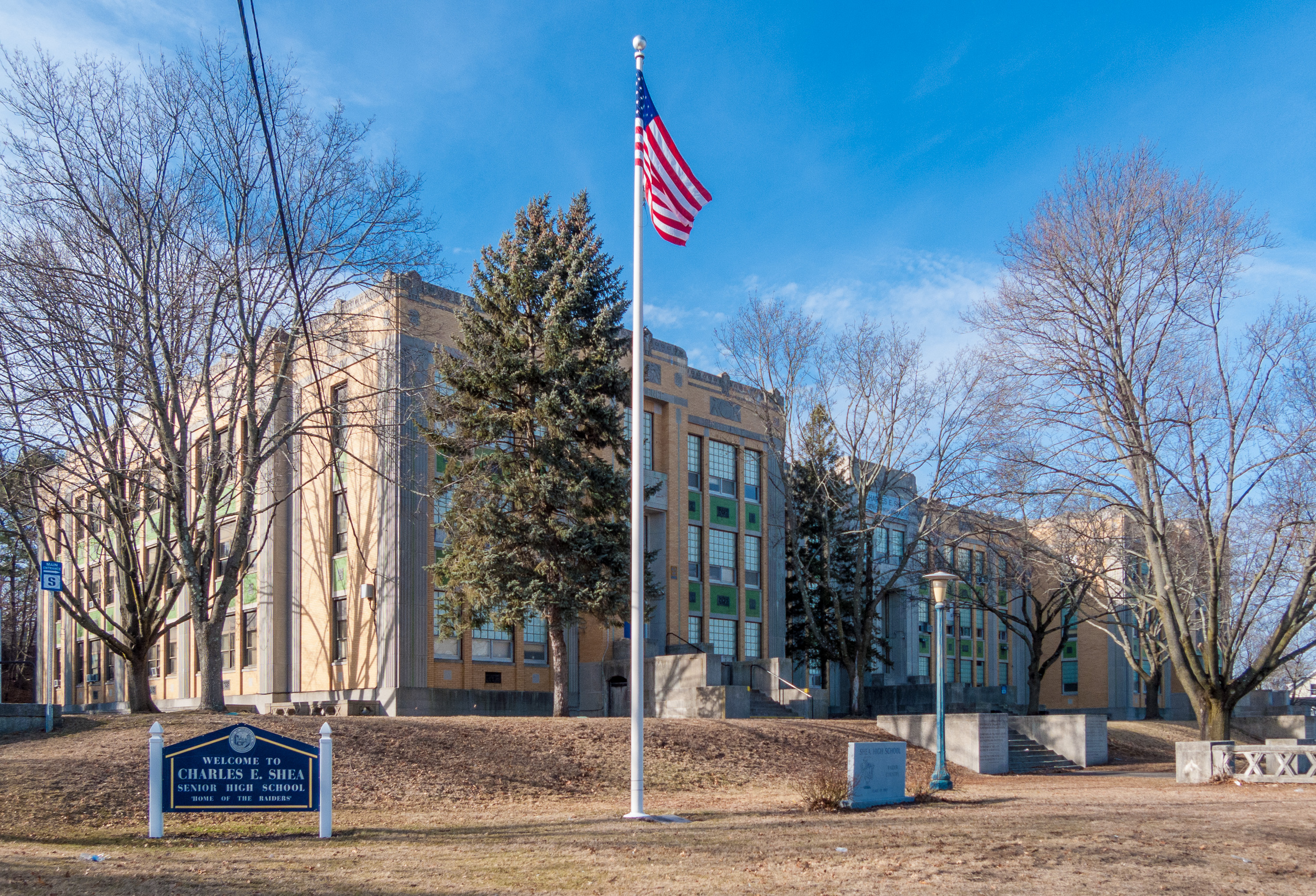

Location
- 485 East Ave. Pawtucket, Rhode Island 02860

Information
- School type: Public high school
- School district: Pawtucket School District
- Principal: Matthew Bergeron
- Staff: 62.00 (FTE)
- Grades: 9–12
- Enrollment: 823 (2023-2024)
- Student to teacher ratio: 13.27
- Color
- Mascot: Raider
- Website: https://www.psdri.net/shea/
- Pawtucket West High School
- U.S. National Register of Historic Places
- Location within Rhode Island Location within the United States
- Location: Pawtucket, Rhode Island
- Coordinates: 41°51′55″N 71°23′19″W
- Built: 1938
- Architect: O'Malley, John F.
- Architectural style: Art Deco
- MPS: Pawtucket MRA
- NRHP reference No.: 83003845
- Added to NRHP: November 18, 1983

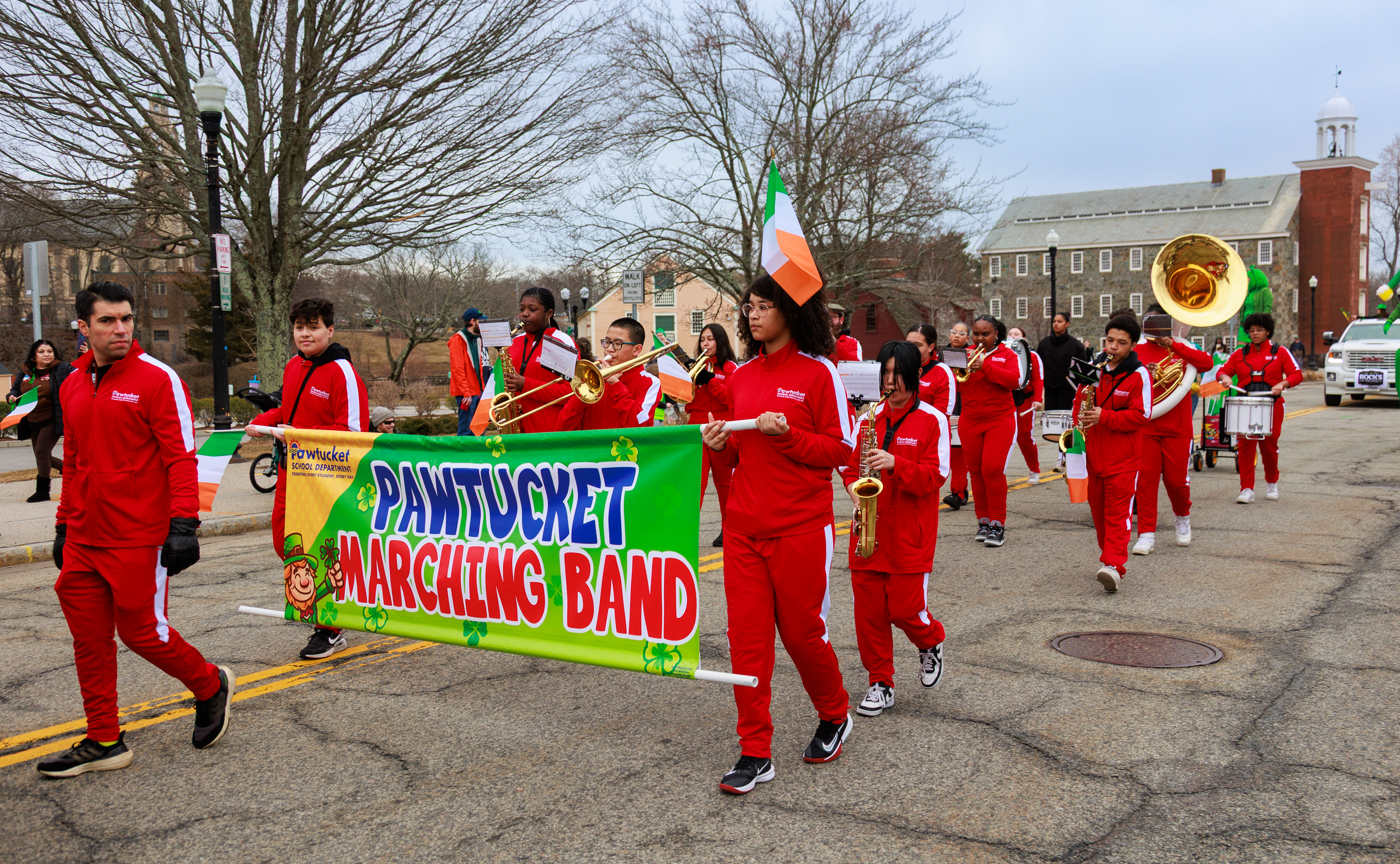
The Pawtucket Marching Band is open to all Pawtucket middle and high schools

Charles E. Shea High School, commonly known as Shea High School and previously known as Pawtucket West High School, is an American public secondary school at 485 East Avenue in Pawtucket, Rhode Island. Shea is part of the Pawtucket School Department. The mascot is the "Shea High Raider". The school was named after a well-known Pawtucket resident and former Superintendent of Pawtucket Schools, Charles E. Shea.

== About the school ==
In the 1950s through the late 1960s, what was then Pawtucket West High School shared a building with the East Avenue Elementary School, a local neighborhood all Caucasian school. After the Supreme Court ruling on Brown vs. the Board of Education, students were bussed to Samuel Slater Junior High School for their middle school years, which were seventh, eighth and ninth grade in that era. Students were tracked into a college preparation strand or a vocational education strand, as was common in those days.

LL Cool J and U.S. Representative Patrick Kennedy made a surprise visit to Shea High School in 2005 to talk about the future and school academics. LL Cool J then met with students and signed autographs.

After a low test-score history for some years, the State authorities were going to take control of the school, but good scores in 2006 averted this.

After 2010 changes to the No Child Left Behind Act granted federal waivers for schools with low graduation rates upon implementing leadership change, then-principal Dr Christopher Lord stepped down to ensure funding, despite widespread acclaim and public support. The school was targeted by the state in 2011 for turnaround because of low test scores and a graduation rate of 67 percent. A new principal introduced changes, and by 2014 the graduation rate had risen to 88 percent, higher than the state average. Graduation rates fell to 78% by 2020 upon the school's exit from turnaround

School enrollment is about 1,188 students: 1% Asian, 29% Hispanic, 39% Black, and 31% White.

Pawtucket Mayor Don Grebien attends Shea's graduation every year. Each year the school has a celebrity guest speaker for the graduating class.

== Architecture ==
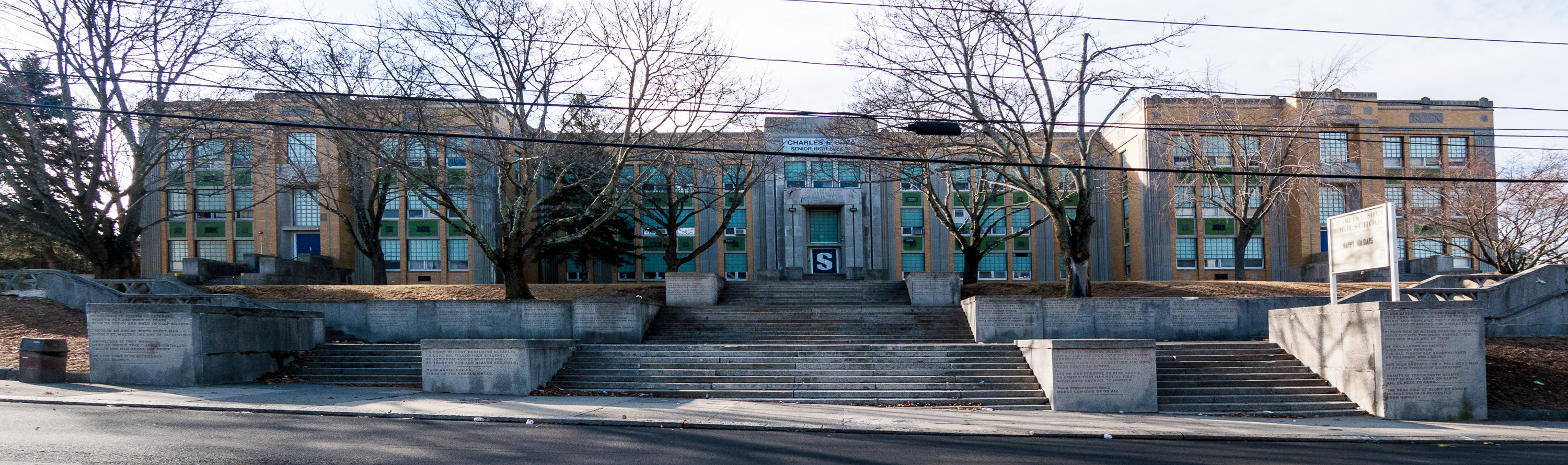
Front of the building

The main school building is an imposing three-story Art Deco structure, set back on a terraced lot on the west side of East Avenue. It is an E-shaped building, with a central portion flanked by end bays which project slightly to the front, and more to the rear. Behind the central portion a third leg extends to the rear. The building was designed by Providence architect John F. O'Malley and built in 1938–39 with funding from the Public Works Administration. The building was listed on the National Register of Historic Places in 1983.

== Notable alumni ==
- John M. Nielson, 1961, third president of Asia-Pacific Nazarene Theological Seminary (1989-2001)
- Ronni Kern, Hollywood screenwriter
- Chet Simmons, President NBC Sports, President ESPN, Commissioner USFL

== See also ==
- National Register of Historic Places listings in Pawtucket, Rhode Island
