= Mixed Magic Theatre =

- Interactive map of Mixed Magic Theatre
- Address: 560 Mineral Spring Avenue
- Location: Pawtucket, Rhode Island, US
- Coordinates: 41.8722°N 71.4059°W

Website
- https://www.mmtri.org//

Mixed Magic Theatre is a non-profit theater and performance venue at Lorraine Mills in Pawtucket, Rhode Island.

Mixed Magic Theatre was founded in 2000 by Bernadet and Ricard Pitts-Wiley. It was originally located in North Kingstown, Rhode Island. The theatre relocated to Pawtucket, Rhode Island, in 2005. In 2007 Mixed Magic officially altered its mission to "bring diverse stories to the stage." The theatre added an outdoor amphitheater in 2017.

In addition to producing plays, the theatre acts as a venue for local and national performers. Mixed Magic also produces a set of regular programs, including Rise to Black, a theater series featuring scenes from the works of black artists and the Exult Choir, the theatre's resident choir, formed in 2006.

The theatre has attracted international attention for producing Moby Dick: Then and Now, an interpretation of Herman Melville's novel Moby Dick by Ricardo Pitts-Willey. The production featured two casts, an adult company that portrayed the Melville version of the story, and a youth cast where the actors portrayed a story where the white whale is cocaine. The play traveled to the John F. Kennedy Center for the Performing Arts in Washington, D.C., and the International Melville Conference held by the Melville Society in Poland in 2007.
