= St. Joseph Parish, Central Falls =

Coordinates: 41°53′6.5″N 71°23′1.2″W

St. Joseph Parish
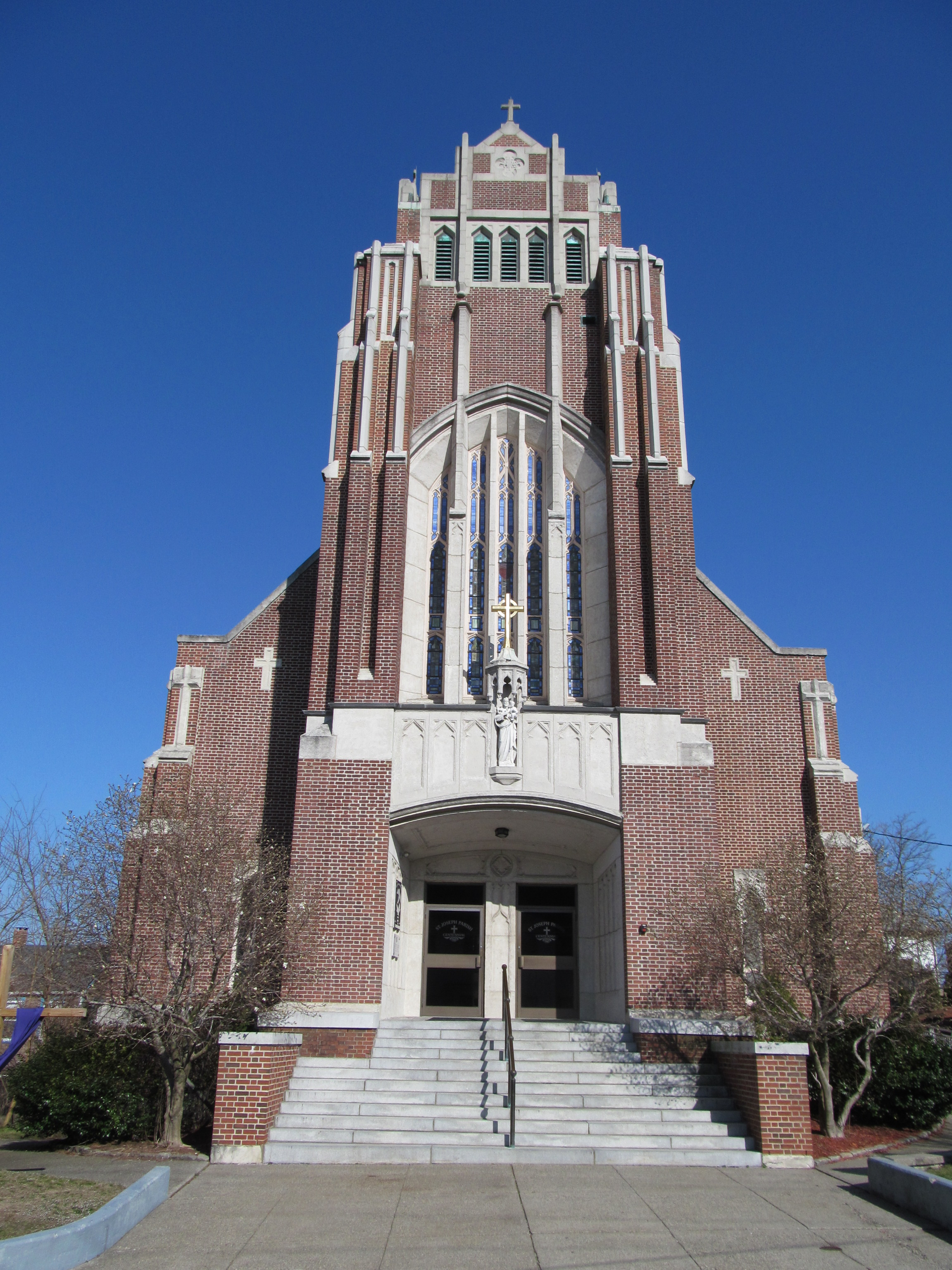
- St. Joseph Parish
- St. Joseph Parish
- Location: 391 High Street; Central Falls, Rhode Island
- Country: United States
- Denomination: Roman Catholic

History
- Founded: 1905
- Founder: Polish immigrants
- Dedication: St. Joseph

Architecture
- Architect: John F. O'Malley
- Style: Gothic Revival
- Groundbreaking: 1915

Administration
- Province: Hartford
- Diocese: Providence

Clergy
- Bishop(s): Thomas J. Tobin, D.D.
- Pastor: Dariusz G. Jonczyk

St. Joseph Parish is designated for Polish immigrants in Central Falls, Rhode Island, United States.

== History ==
Founded in 1905, it is one of the Polish-American Roman Catholic parishes in New England in the Diocese of Providence. The current building was designed in 1915 by Providence architect John F. O'Malley in the Gothic Revival style.

== See also ==
- Catholic Church in the United States
- Catholic parish church
- Pastoral care
- Index of Catholic Church articles
- The Haitian Project

== Bibliography ==
- A short parish history from the 1957 Jubilee Book - St. Joseph Parish - Central Falls RI. the internet Polish Genealogical Source. 1957.
- Kruszka, Waclaw (1998). A History of the Poles in America to 1908; Part III: Poles in the Eastern and Southern States. Washington, D.C.: The Catholic University of America Press.
- The 150th Anniversary of Polish-American Pastoral Ministry. Webster, Massachusetts: St. Joseph Basilica. September 11, 2005.
- The Official Catholic Directory in USA
