= Pawtucket, Rhode Island =

City in Rhode Island, United States

Pawtucket
- City
- City of Pawtucket
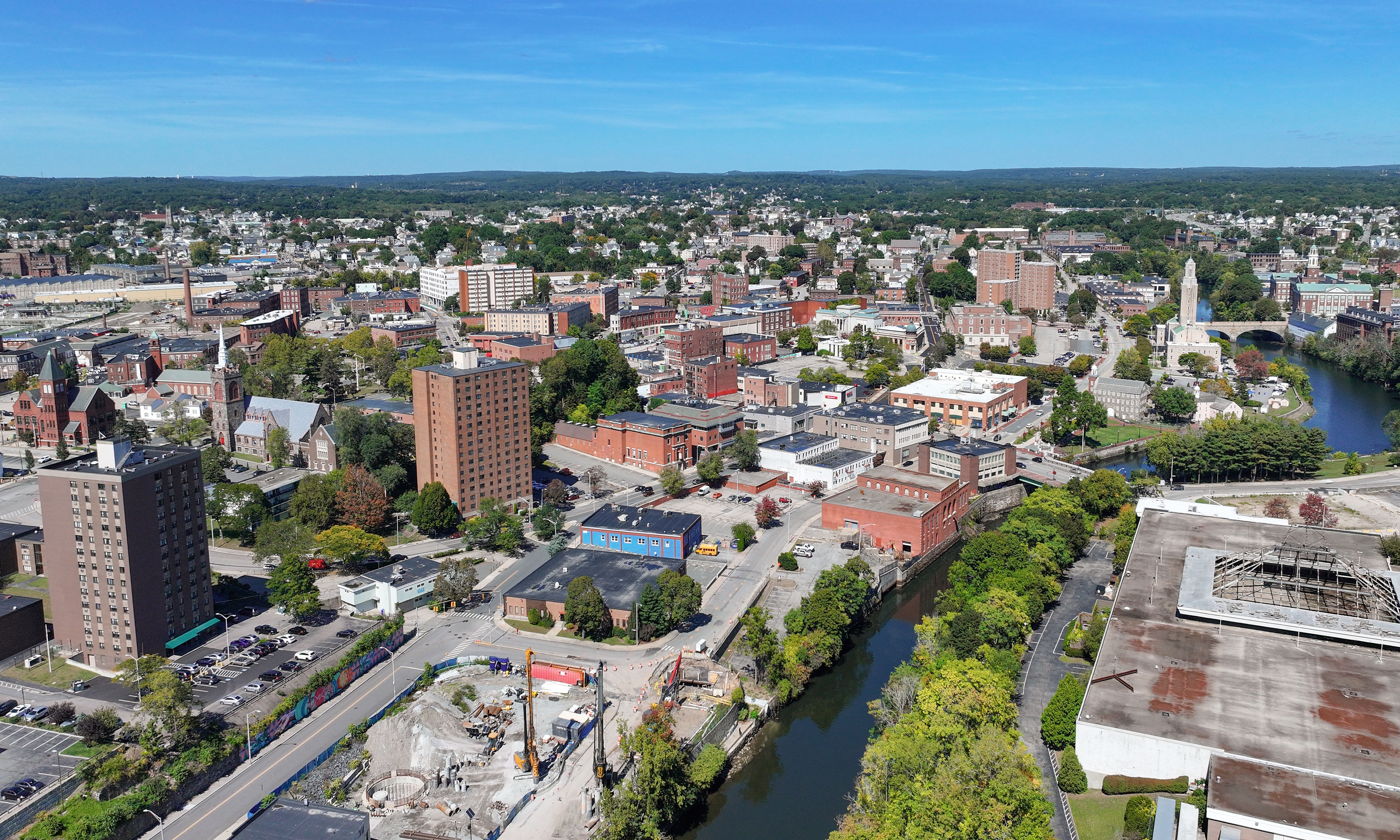
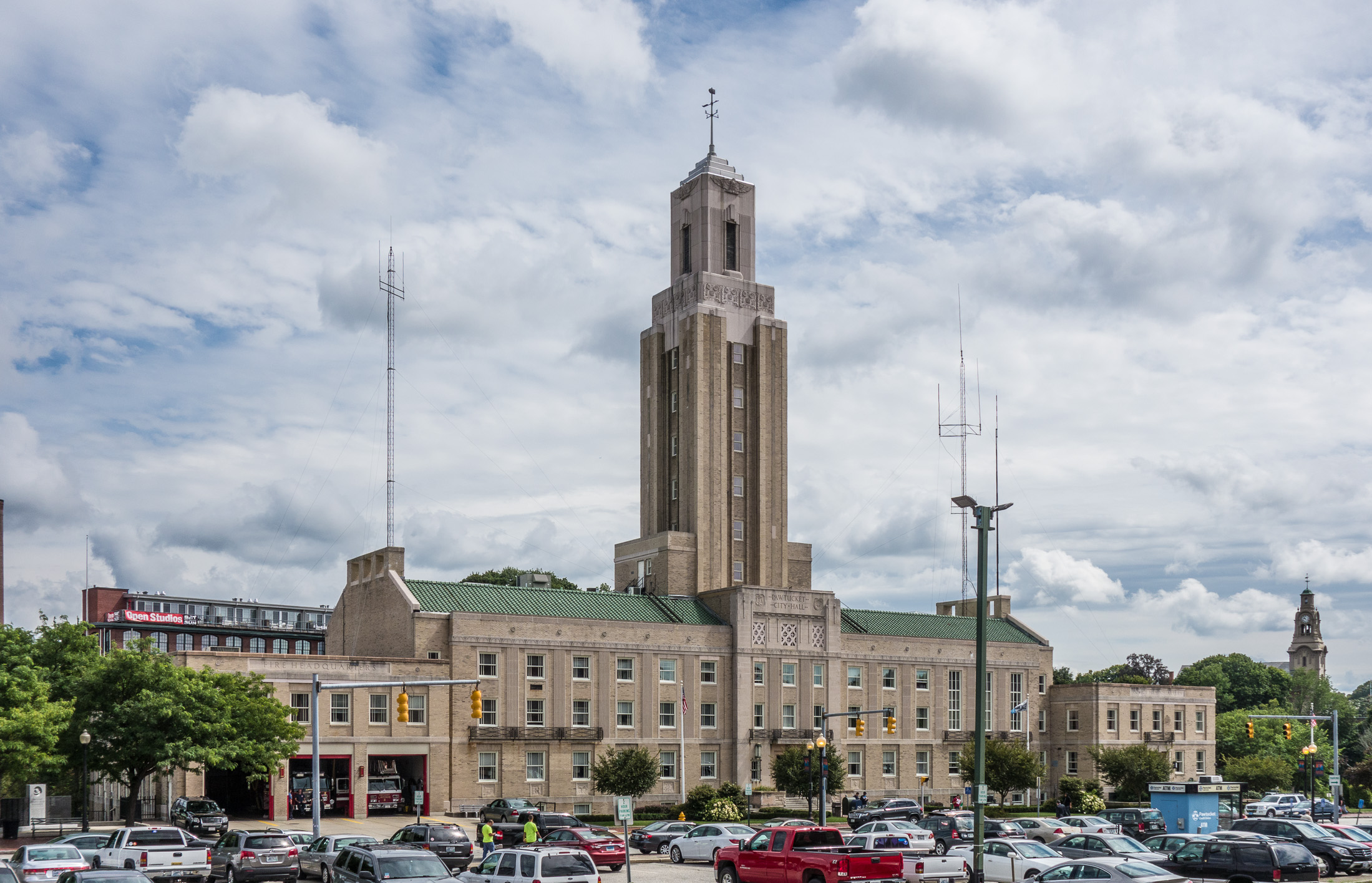
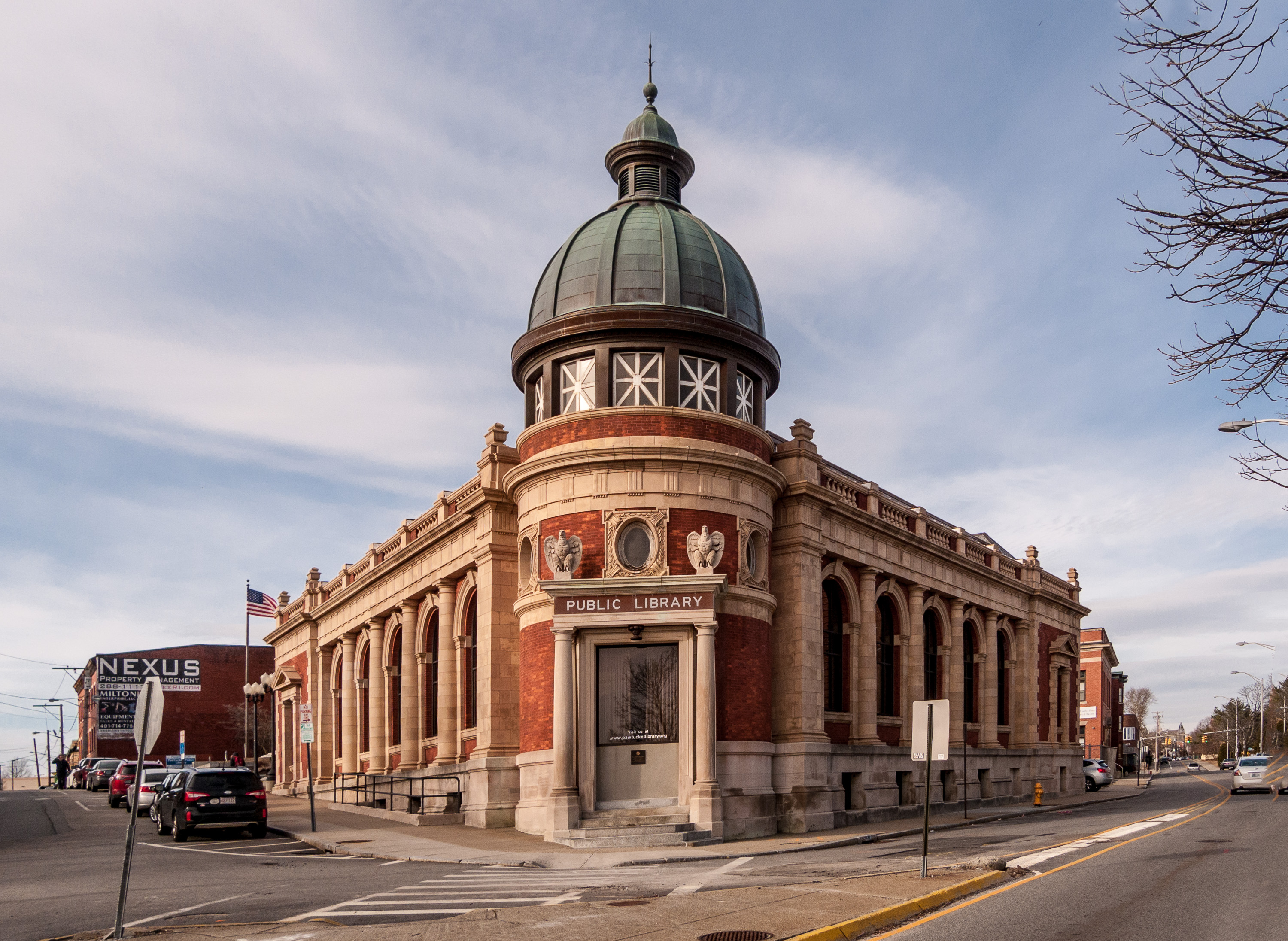
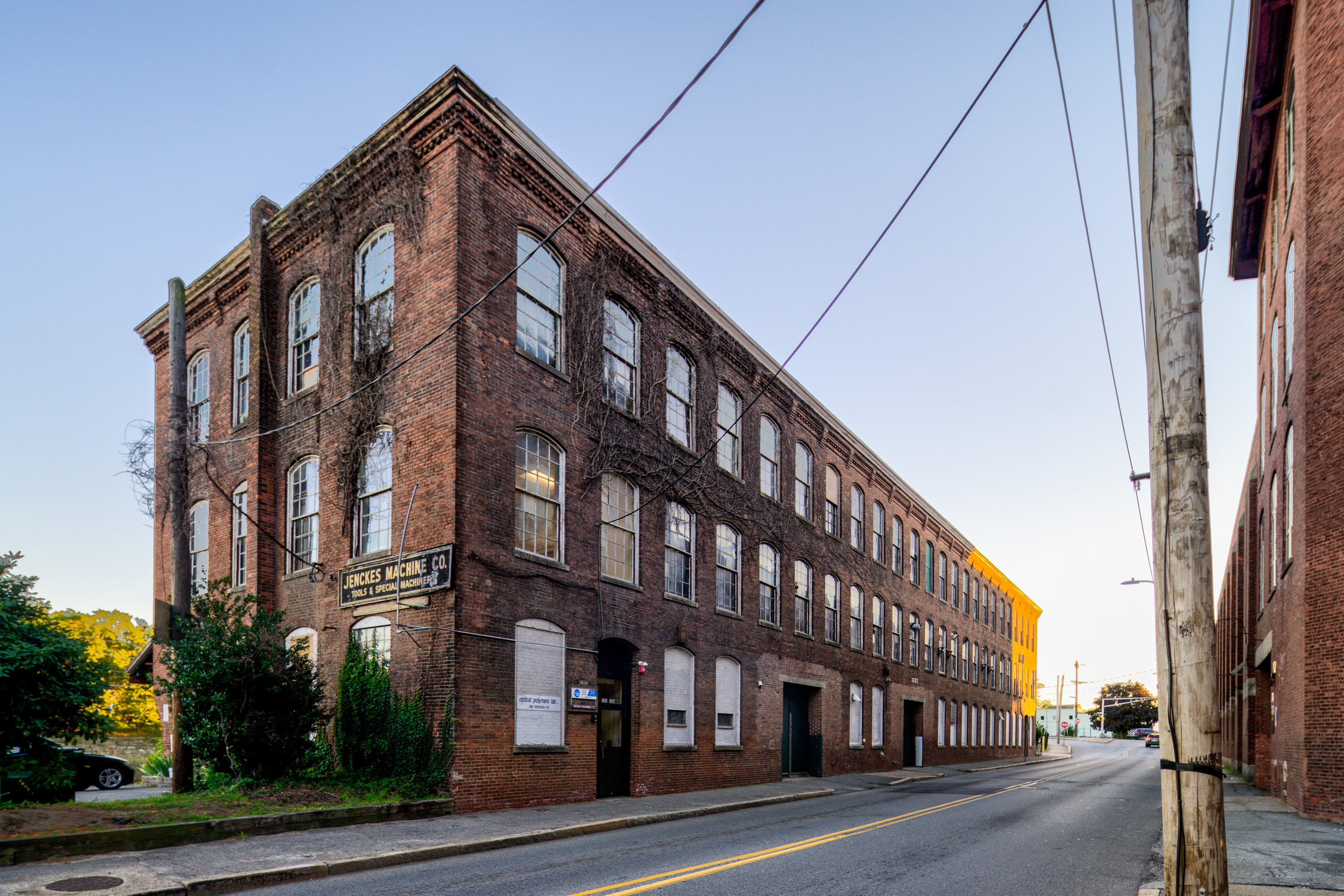
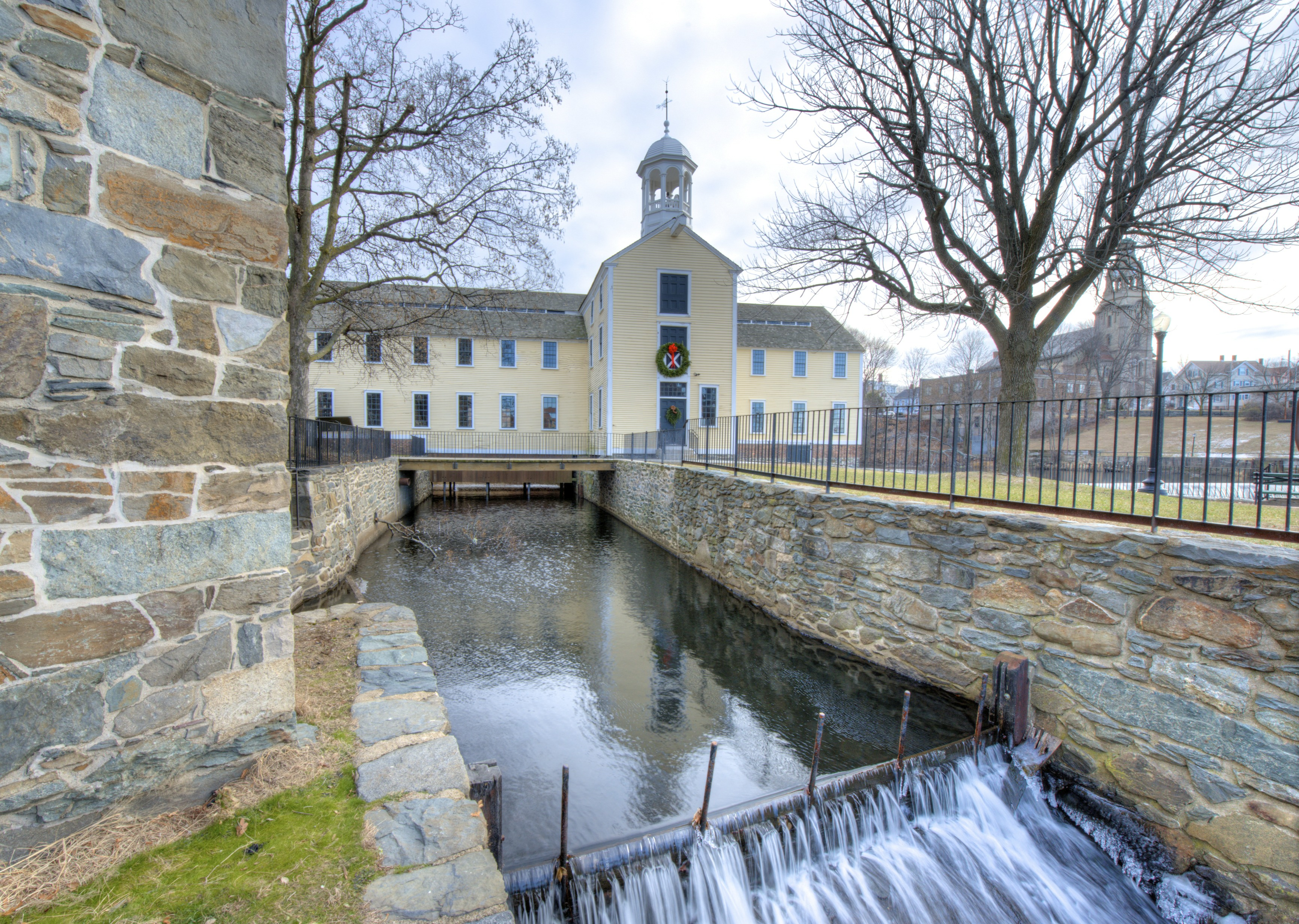
- Skyline City Hall Old Post Office Jenckes Spinning Company Slater Mill

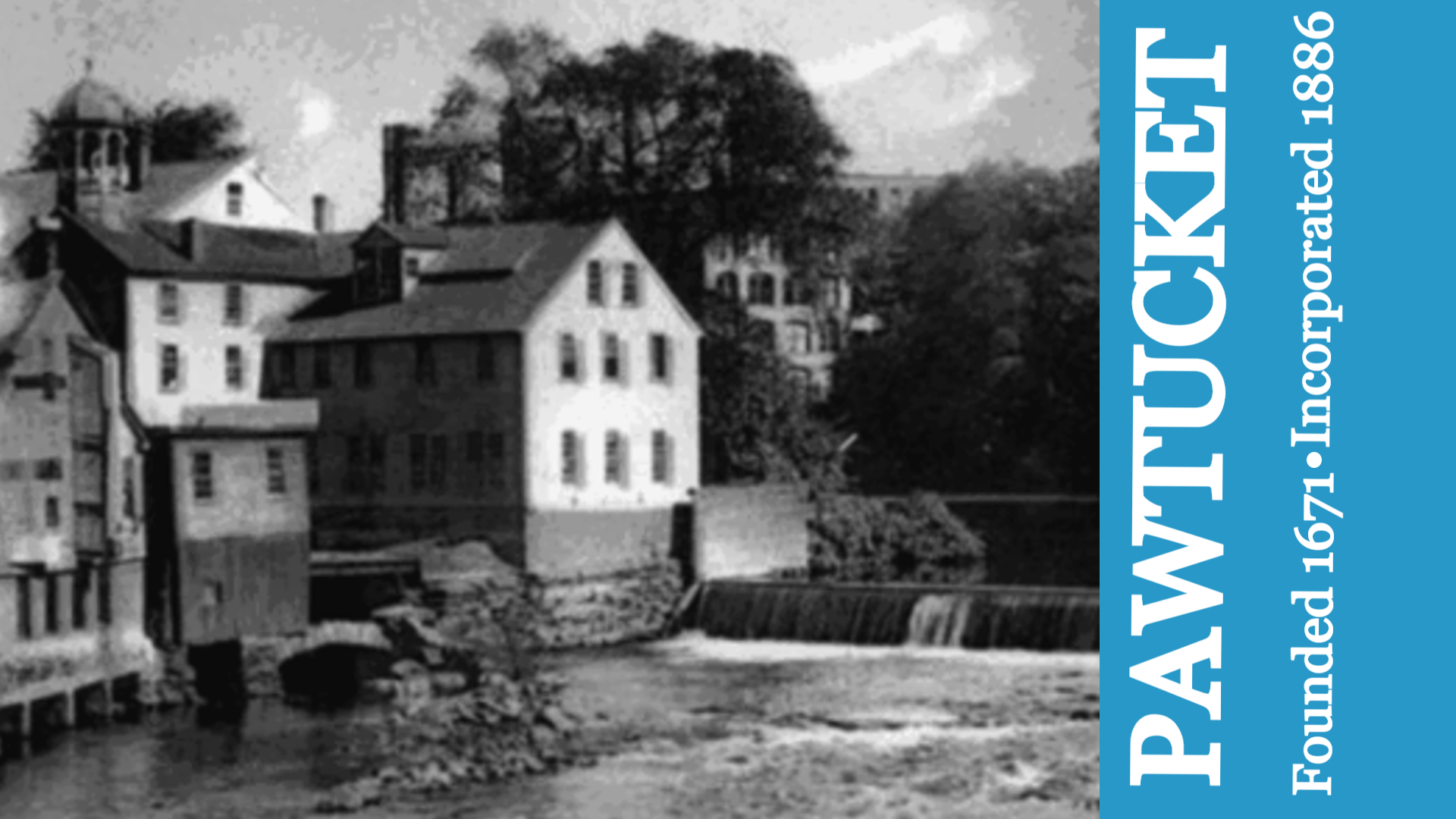
- Flag Logo
- Motto: Join The Evolution
- Location within Providence County and the state of Rhode Island

- Location in Rhode Island Location in the United States
- Coordinates: 41°52′33″N 71°22′37″W
- Country: United States
- State: Rhode Island
- County: Providence
- Founded (town): 1671
- Incorporated (city): 1886

Government
  - Type: Mayor-council
  - Mayor: Donald Grebien (D)
  - City Council: Michael A. Araujo (D); Roberto H. Moreno (D); Yesenia Rubio (D); David P. Moran (D); Mark J. Wildenhain (D); Terrence E. Mercer (D); Neicy Coderre (D); Clovis C. Gregor (D); Marlena Martins Stachowiak (D)

Area
  - Total: 8.97 sq mi (23.22 km^{2})
  - Land: 8.67 sq mi (22.45 km^{2})
  - Water: 0.30 sq mi (0.77 km^{2})
- Elevation: 39 ft (12 m)

Population (2020)
  - Total: 75,604
  - Density: 8,723.0/sq mi (3,367.98/km^{2})
- Time zone: UTC−5
  - Summer (DST): UTC−4 (Eastern)
- ZIP Codes: 02860–02861
- Area code: 401
- FIPS code: 44-54640
- GNIS feature ID: 1218926
- Website: pawtucketri.gov

Pawtucket (/pəˈtʌkɪt/ pə-TUK-it) is a city in Providence County, Rhode Island, United States. The population was 75,604 at the 2020 census, making the city the fourth-largest in the state. Pawtucket borders Providence and East Providence to the south, Central Falls and Lincoln to the north, and North Providence to the west. The city also borders the Massachusetts municipalities of Seekonk and Attleboro.

Pawtucket was an early and important center of textile manufacturing. It is home to Slater Mill, a historic textile mill recognized for its role helping to found the Industrial Revolution in the United States.

== History ==
The name "Pawtucket" comes from the Algonquian word for "river fall."

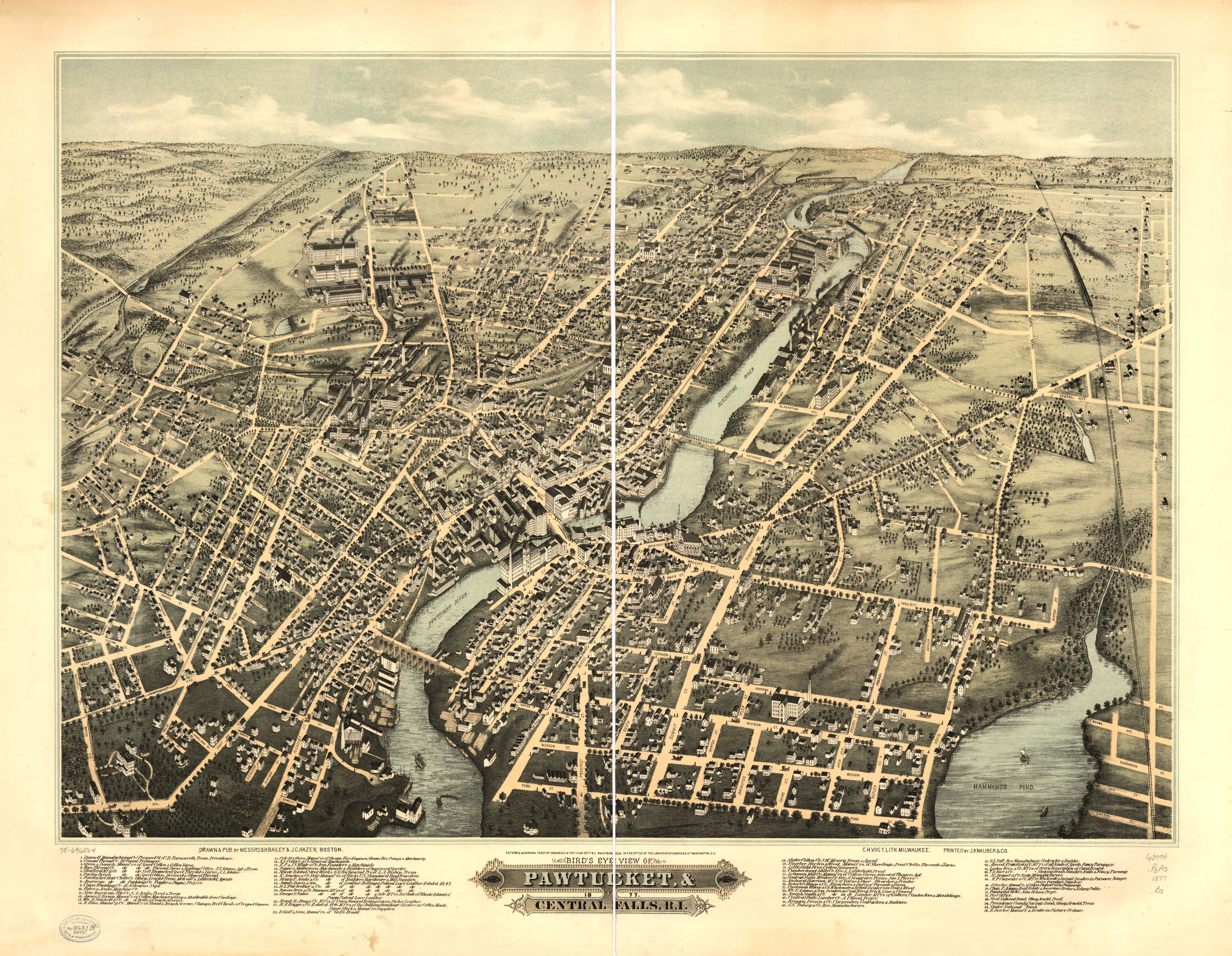
Panoramic map of Pawtucket and Central Falls (1877)

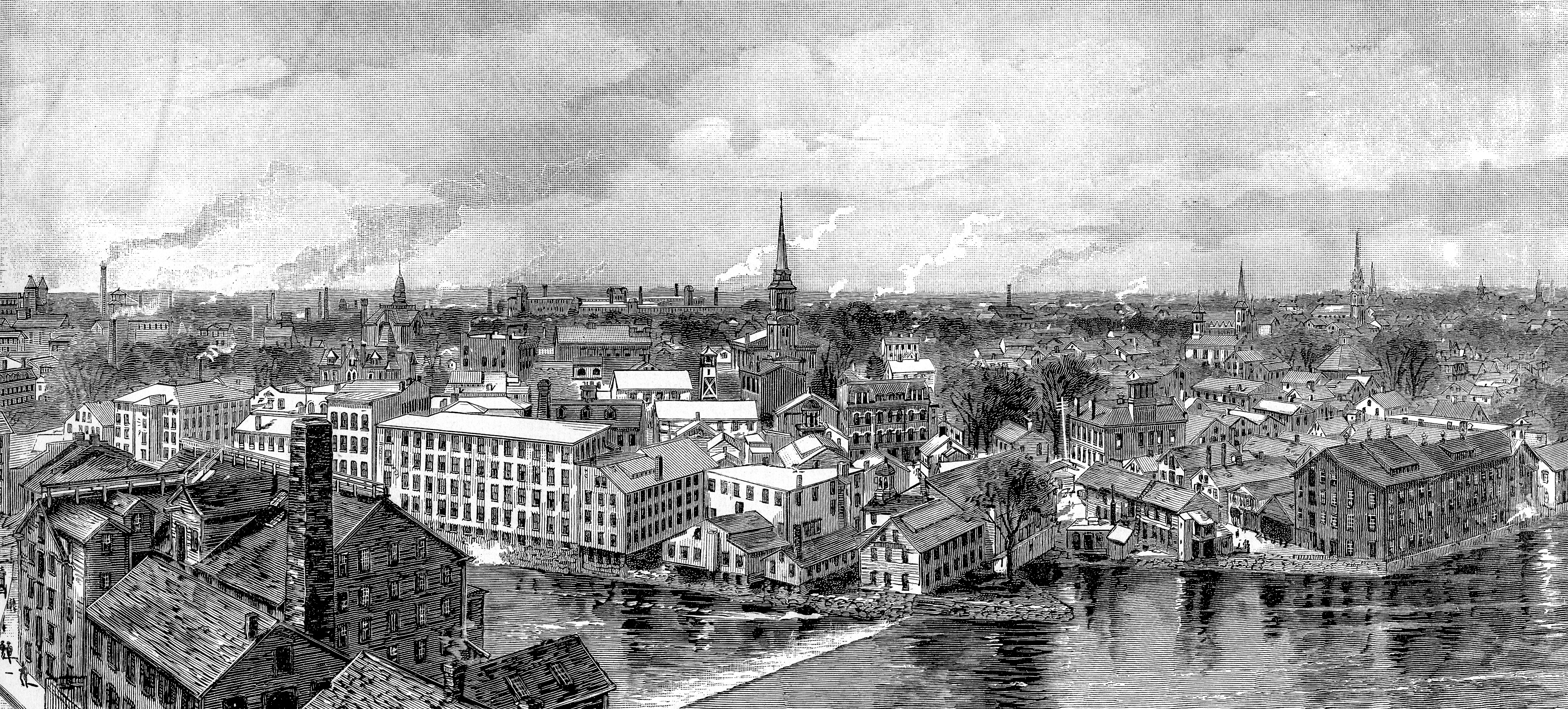
Pawtucket in 1886 viewed from the steeple of the Pawtucket Congregational Church

The Pawtucket region was said to have been one of the most populous places in New England prior to the arrival of European settlers. American Indians would catch the salmon and smaller fish that gathered at the falls. The first settler here was Joseph Jenckes Jr. who came to the region from Lynn, Massachusetts. He purchased about 60 acres near Pawtucket Falls in 1671, then established a sawmill and forge. The entire town was destroyed during King Philip's War.

Other settlers followed Jenks, and the area became home to manufacturers of muskets, linseed oil, potash, and ships by 1775. Also around this time, Oziel Wilkinson and his family set up an iron forge that made anchors, nails, screws, farm implements, and cannons.

In the 1790s, investors started to build mills along the Blackstone River, which caused conflict over water rights and impacted local workers' lives. Following some difficulties in the textile industry in the early 1820s, a group of mill owners decided to extend the daily hours and lower the income of power-loom weavers, who were at the time all women aged 15–30 years. This led to the first factory strike in the US in May 1824, when about one hundred women left their workplaces at the mills, causing them to shut down. A large number of workers then joined the strike, which lasted from May 26 to June 3, when a compromise was reached. This first walkout led to labor organizing and further strikes in the whole region.

By the 1920s, Pawtucket was a prosperous mill town. The city had a half-dozen movie theaters, two dozen hotels, and a collection of fine commercial and residential architecture. Perhaps the most impressive public building in Pawtucket was the Leroy Theatre, an ornate movie palace that was called "Pawtucket's Million Dollar Theater". Many wealthy mill owners such as Darius Goff built their mansions in the area.

In 1922, it was affected by the 1922 New England Textile Strike, shutting down the mills in the city over an attempted wage cut and hours increase.

The textile business in New England declined during the Great Depression, with many manufacturers closing or moving their facilities to the South where operations and labor were cheaper. Later in the 20th century, Pawtucket began to lose some of its architectural heritage to the wrecking ball, including the Leroy Theatre.

Pawtucket retained much of its industrial base, however. Today, goods produced in the city include lace, non-woven and elastic woven materials, jewelry, silverware, metals, and textiles. Hasbro, one of the world's largest manufacturers of toys and games, is headquartered in Pawtucket.

=== Incorporation ===
Originally, the land west of the Blackstone River was part of nearby North Providence, and east of the Blackstone River was originally settled as part of Rehoboth, Massachusetts. The first Pawtucket to be incorporated was when Rehoboth gave up their land in 1828, and Pawtucket became a new town in Massachusetts. In 1862, the eastern portion was absorbed into Providence County, Rhode Island. On March 1, 1862, the area of Pawtucket and East Providence was shifted into Rhode Island, and the new border remains to this day—following a 225-year border dispute among the Rhode Island Colony, Plymouth Colony, the State of Rhode Island, and the Commonwealth of Massachusetts. In 1874, the land west of the river was taken from North Providence and added to the town of Pawtucket, but it acted as two different towns. Finally in 1886, West and East Pawtucket were merged and the city was incorporated.

== Geography ==
According to the United States Census Bureau, the city has a total area of 9.0 square miles (23 km^{2}), of which 8.7 square miles (23 km^{2}) is land and 0.3 square miles (0.78 km^{2}) (2.89%) is water. Pawtucket lies within three drainage basins. These include the Blackstone River (including the Seekonk River), the Moshassuck River and the Ten Mile River.

== Demographics ==
Historical population
Census	Pop.	Note	%±
1830	1,459		—
1840	2,184		49.7%
1850	3,753		71.8%
1860	4,200		11.9%
1870	6,619		57.6%
1880	19,030		187.5%
1890	27,633		45.2%
1900	39,231		42.0%
1910	51,622		31.6%
1920	64,248		24.5%
1930	77,149		20.1%
1940	75,797		−1.8%
1950	81,436		7.4%
1960	81,001		−0.5%
1970	76,984		−5.0%
1980	71,204		−7.5%
1990	72,644		2.0%
2000	72,958		0.4%
2010	71,148		−2.5%
2020	75,604		6.3%
U.S. Decennial Census

=== 2020 census ===
As of the 2020 census, Pawtucket had a population of 75,604, 31,565 households, and 17,202 families. The population density was 8,723.2 per square mile (3,368.0/km^{2}), and there were 33,832 housing units at an average density of 3,903.5 per square mile (1,507.2/km^{2}). The racial composition as of the census is documented in the table below.

Racial composition as of the 2020 census
Race	Number	Percent
White	37,492	49.6%
Black or African American	9,836	13.0%
American Indian and Alaska Native	475	0.6%
Asian	1,140	1.5%
Native Hawaiian and Other Pacific Islander	57	0.1%
Some other race	12,429	16.4%
Two or more races	14,175	18.7%
Hispanic or Latino (of any race)	18,727	24.8%

21.8% of residents were under the age of 18, 8.4% were from 18 to 24, 29.4% were from 25 to 44, 26.2% were from 45 to 64, and 14.3% were 65 years of age or older. The median age was 37.7 years. For every 100 females there were 93.1 males, and for every 100 females age 18 and over there were 90.4 males age 18 and over. 100.0% of residents lived in urban areas, while 0.0% lived in rural areas.

There were 31,565 households in Pawtucket, of which 29.4% had children under the age of 18 living in them. Of all households, 32.4% were married-couple households, 23.4% were households with a male householder and no spouse or partner present, and 34.8% were households with a female householder and no spouse or partner present. About 33.5% of all households were made up of individuals and 11.3% had someone living alone who was 65 years of age or older.

There were 33,832 housing units, of which 6.7% were vacant. The homeowner vacancy rate was 1.3% and the rental vacancy rate was 5.4%.

The average household size was 2.6 and the average family size was 3.2. The percent of those with a bachelor's degree or higher was estimated to be 16.3% of the population.

The 2016–2020 5-year American Community Survey estimates show that the median household income was $52,902 (with a margin of error of +/- $3,574) and the median family income was $66,544 (+/- $2,789). Males had a median income of $39,641 (+/- $1,932) versus $31,646 (+/- $1,286) for females. The median income for those above 16 years old was $35,243 (+/- $1,022). Approximately 11.4% of families and 14.1% of the population were below the poverty line, including 20.1% of those under the age of 18 and 14.4% of those ages 65 or over.

=== 2010 census ===
As of the census of 2010, there were 71,141 people, 32,055 households, and 18,508 families residing in the city. Pawtucket was the fourth most populous of Rhode Island's 39 cities and towns. The population density was 8,351.2 inhabitants per square mile (3,224.4/km^{2}). There were 32,055 housing units at an average density of 3,642.2 per square mile (1,406.3/km^{2}). The racial makeup of the city was 50.4% Non-Hispanic white, 18.9% Non-Hispanic African American, 0.6% Native American, 1.6% Non-Hispanic Asian, 0.1% Pacific Islander, mixed race 3.9%, 4.7% other. About 25% of residents are Latino.

There were 32,055 households, out of which 30.5% had children under the age of 18 living with them, 39.7% were married couples living together, 16.8% had a female householder with no husband present, and 38.4% were non-families. Of all households, 32.3% were made up of individuals, and 12.5% had someone living alone who was 65 years of age or older. The average household size was 2.41 and the average family size was 3.07.

In the city, the population was spread out, with 24.9% under the age of 18, 9.1% from 18 to 24, 31.3% from 25 to 44, 19.9% from 45 to 64, and 14.8% who were 65 years of age or older. The median age was 35 years. For every 100 females, there were 90.2 males. For every 100 females age 18 and over, there were 85.9 males.

The median income for a household in the city was $28,124, and the median income for a family was $40,578. Males had a median income of $31,129 versus $23,391 for females. The per capita income for the city was $17,008. About 14.9% of families and 16.8% of the population were below the poverty line, including 24.5% of those under age 18 and 15.2% of those age 65 or over.

=== 2000 census ===
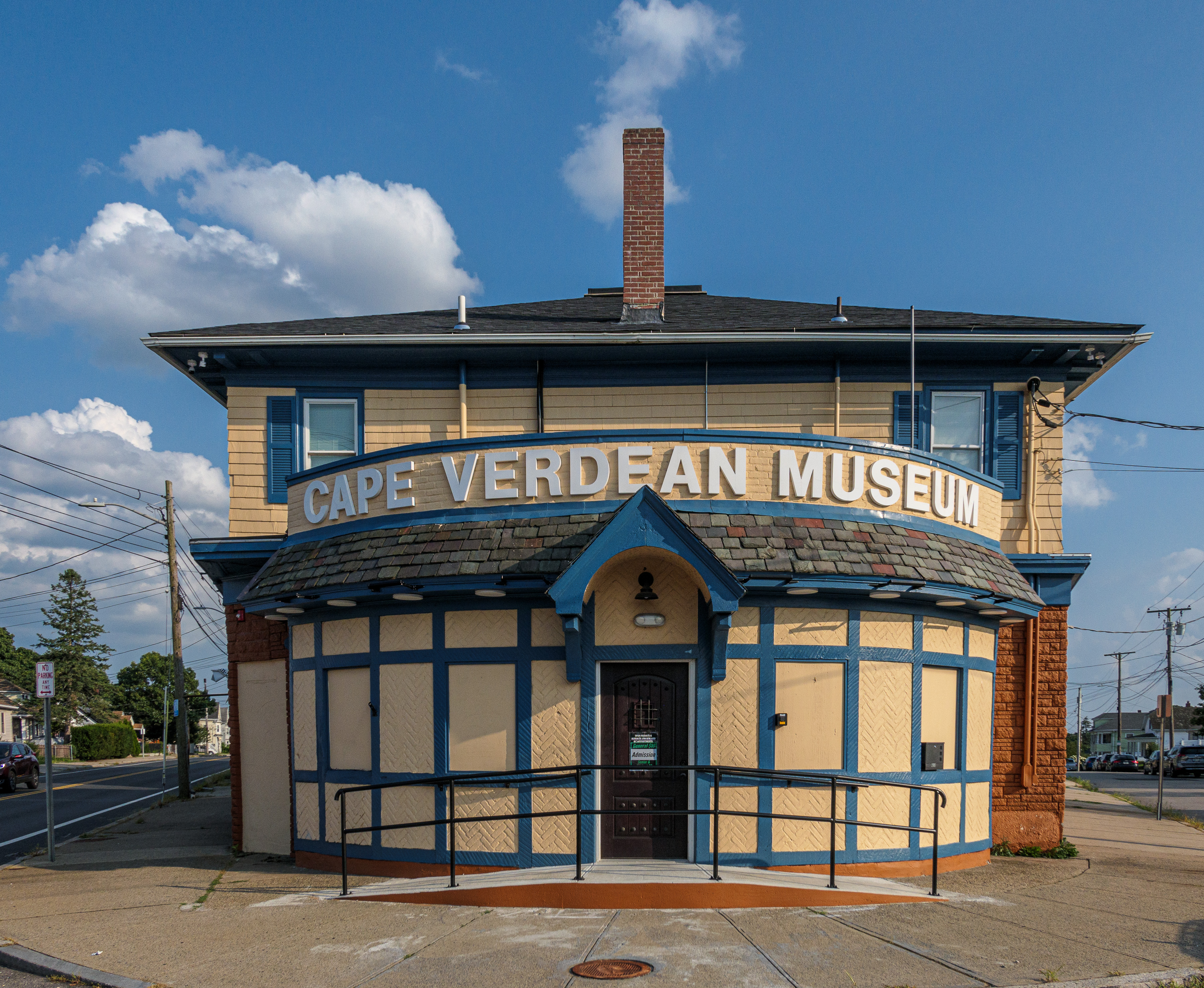
The Cape Verdean Museum relocated to Pawtucket in 2022.

According to the 2000 census, 20.6% of Pawtucket residents are French or French-Canadian. Like nearby cities Providence, Fall River, and New Bedford, Pawtucket hosts a significant population from across the former Portuguese Empire (11.6%), including a significant Cape Verdean population.

Pawtucket is also one of the few areas of the United States with a significant Liberian population, mostly refugees from Charles Taylor's regime; Rhode Island has the highest per capita Liberian population in the country. Pawtucket has a high concentration of West Africans.

== Economy ==
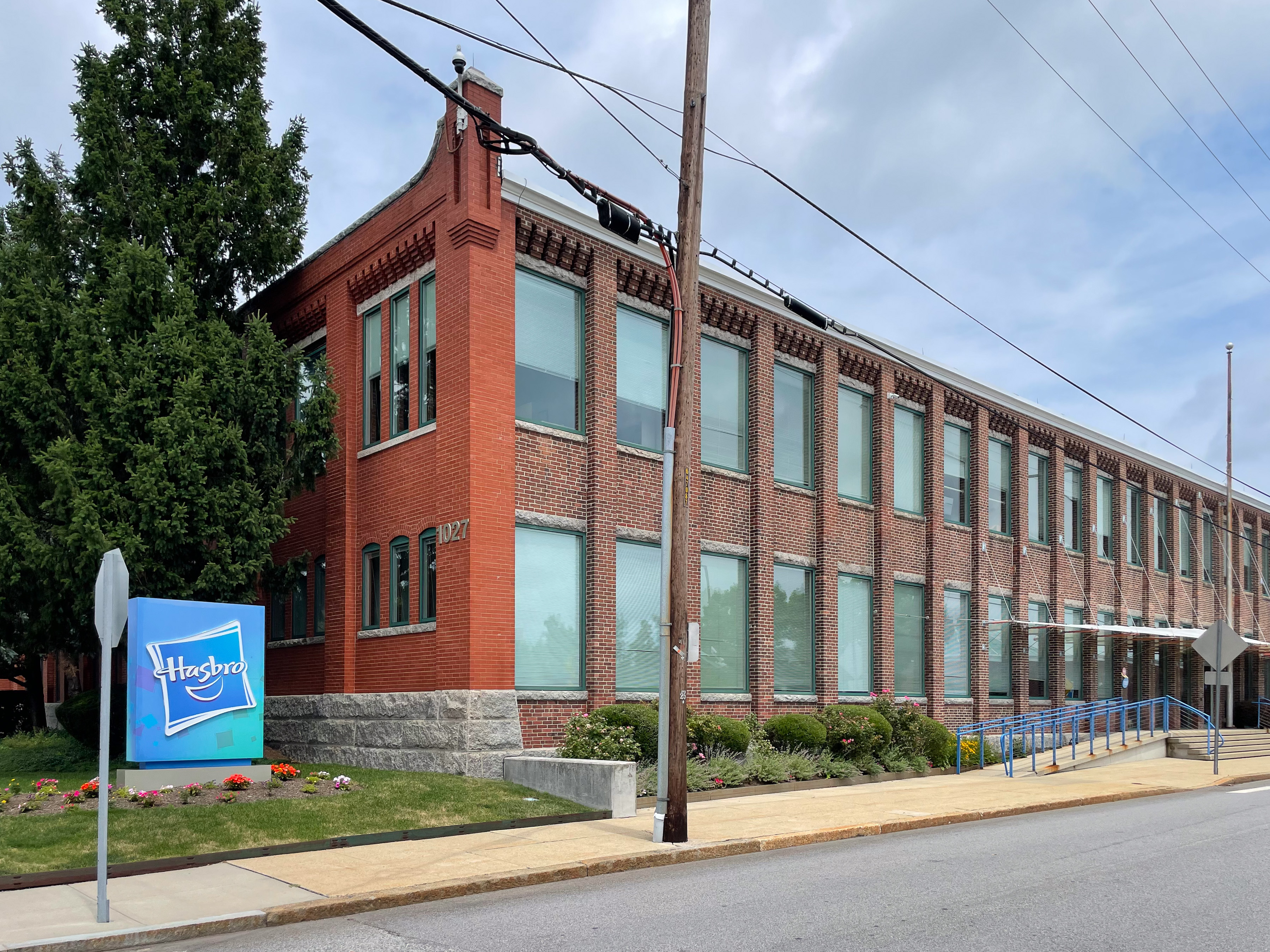
Hasbro Headquarters

Hasbro, a Fortune 1000 toy and game making company, is headquartered in Pawtucket, though the company is moving its headquarters to Boston as of late 2026.

Many healthcare, retail and insurance companies are headquartered in Pawtucket.

== Arts and culture ==
The City of Pawtucket has been supportive of the arts community since 1975. On September 2, 1977, the Beach Boys performed a concert at Narragansett Park. The concert was attended by 40,000 people, making it the largest concert audience in Rhode Island history. In 2017, music historians Al Gomes and Connie Watrous of Big Noise were successful in getting the street where the concert stage stood (the corner of 511 Narragansett Park Drive) officially renamed as "Beach Boys Way".

In January 1999, Herb Weiss, of the Planning Department, was hired to oversee the city's newly created Arts District. Through the support of then Mayor James E. Doyle and Planning Department Michael Cassidy, Weiss brought significant recognition for Pawtucket-Arts oriented development strategy. Mayor Doyle and Weiss hired researcher Ann Galligan, of Northeastern University, to create an arts and cultural plan. Over the years Pawtucket has become a center for arts and culture.

Several experimental/indie rock bands have recorded albums at Machines with Magnets, a recording studio and art gallery in Downtown Pawtucket. Bands that have performed or recorded here include Battles, Lightning Bolt, Brown Bird, and Fang Island.

One hub for arts and culture in the city is Lorraine Mills, a repurposed mill building on the eastern side of the city, which houses institutions including Mixed Magic Theatre, Wage House (comedy club), Pawtucket Arts Collaborative, and Crooked Current Brewery.

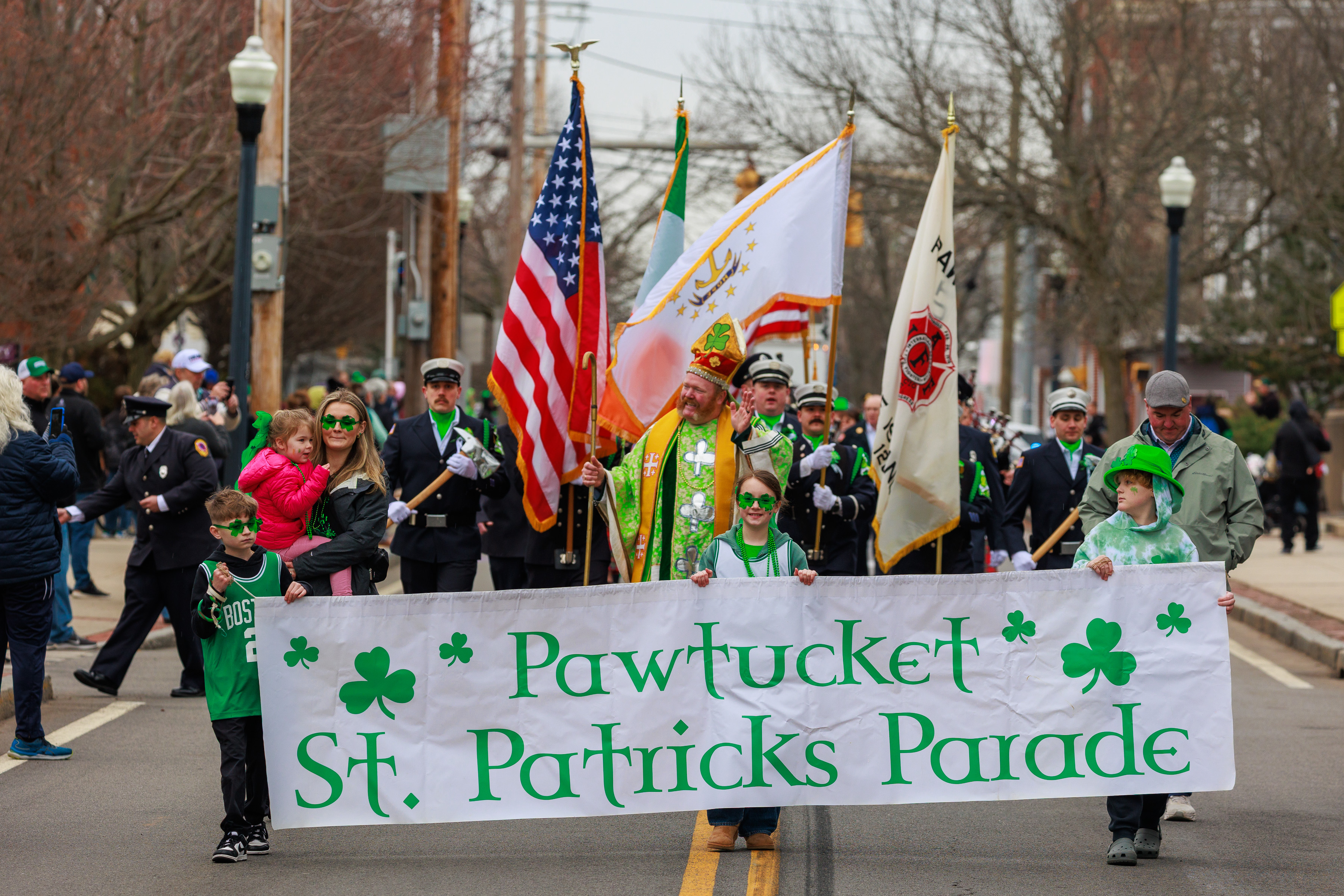
Saint Patrick's Day parade

Each September, the city, in conjunction with the Pawtucket Arts Festival Board of Directors, members chosen from the community, produce an annual citywide Arts Festival. The city has hosted an annual Saint Patrick's Day parade since 1982.

Pawtucket hosts multiple festivals each year that celebrate various cultures and diasporas that have called the city home. These include an annual Greek Festival hosted by Assumption of the Virgin Mary Greek Orthodox Church, Dragon Boat Races and Taiwan Day Festival, Colombian Parade and Festival, and multiple yearly German cultural festivals hosted by the German American Cultural Society of Rhode Island.

== Sports ==
Pawtucket was for many years home to McCoy Stadium, where the Pawtucket Red Sox, the Triple-A Minor League Baseball affiliate of the Boston Red Sox, played from 1970 to 2020. The team was owned by Ben Mondor until his death and was sold by his estate. The longest professional baseball game in history, 33 innings, was played at McCoy Stadium in 1981. Pawtucket has a history of professional baseball dating back to 1892, including the Pawtucket Maroons and Pawtucket Indians. The PawSox franchise was relocated to Worcester, Massachusetts, to become the Worcester Red Sox beginning with the 2021 season. Demolition of McCoy stadium commenced in 2025.

In 2024, Rhode Island FC, of the USL Championship, had its inaugural season. Since 2025, the team plays at the soccer-specific Centreville Bank Stadium near the Seekonk River. The team is headquartered in Pawtucket.

In 1934, the Narragansett Park opened for Thoroughbred horse racing on the location of the former What Cheer Airport. Until its closure in 1978, the track hosted several important races that drew some of the top horses from around the United States including Hall of Fame members; Seabiscuit, War Admiral and Gun Bow.

Beginning in 2027, Pawtucket will be the home of the UFL's Rhode Island Breakers.

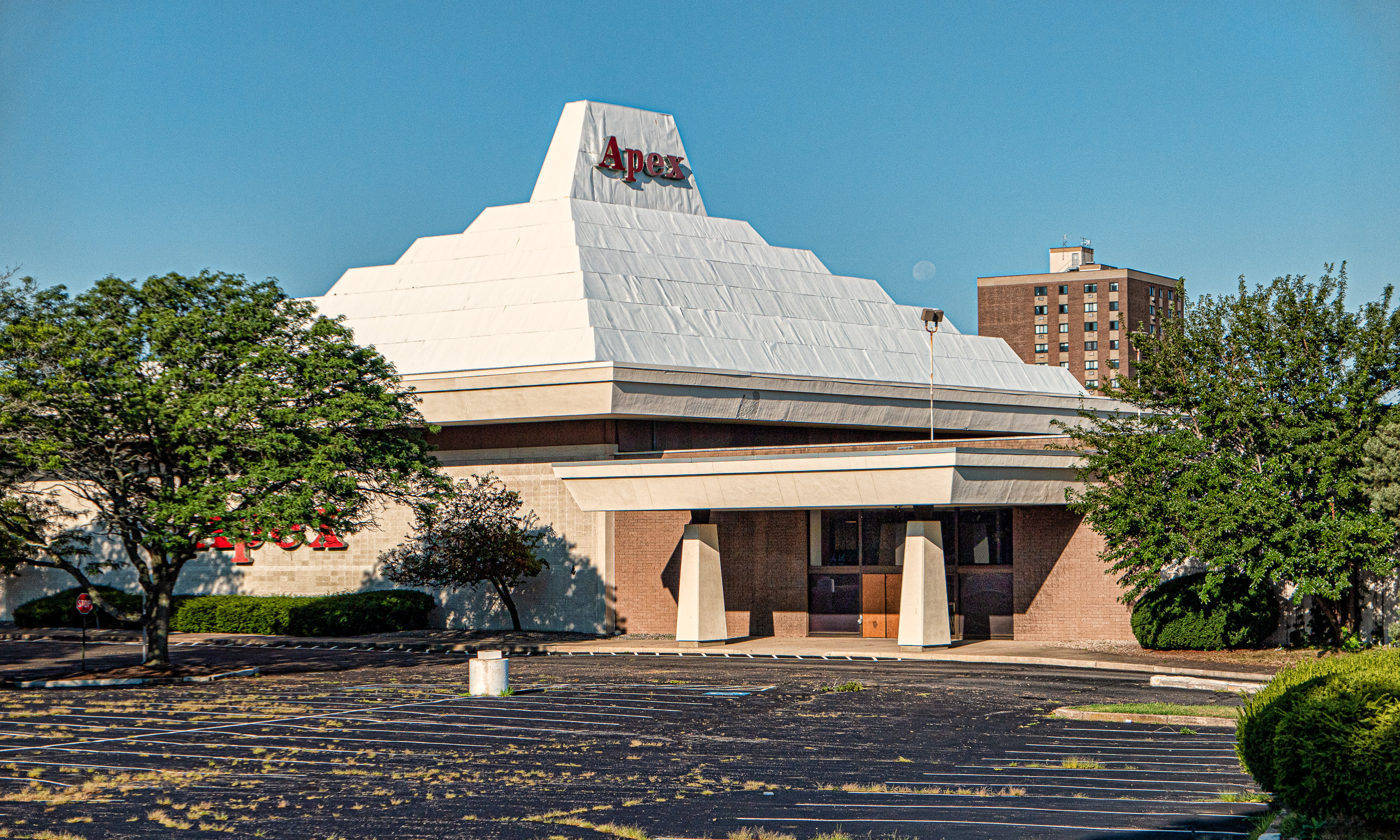
Apex Companies

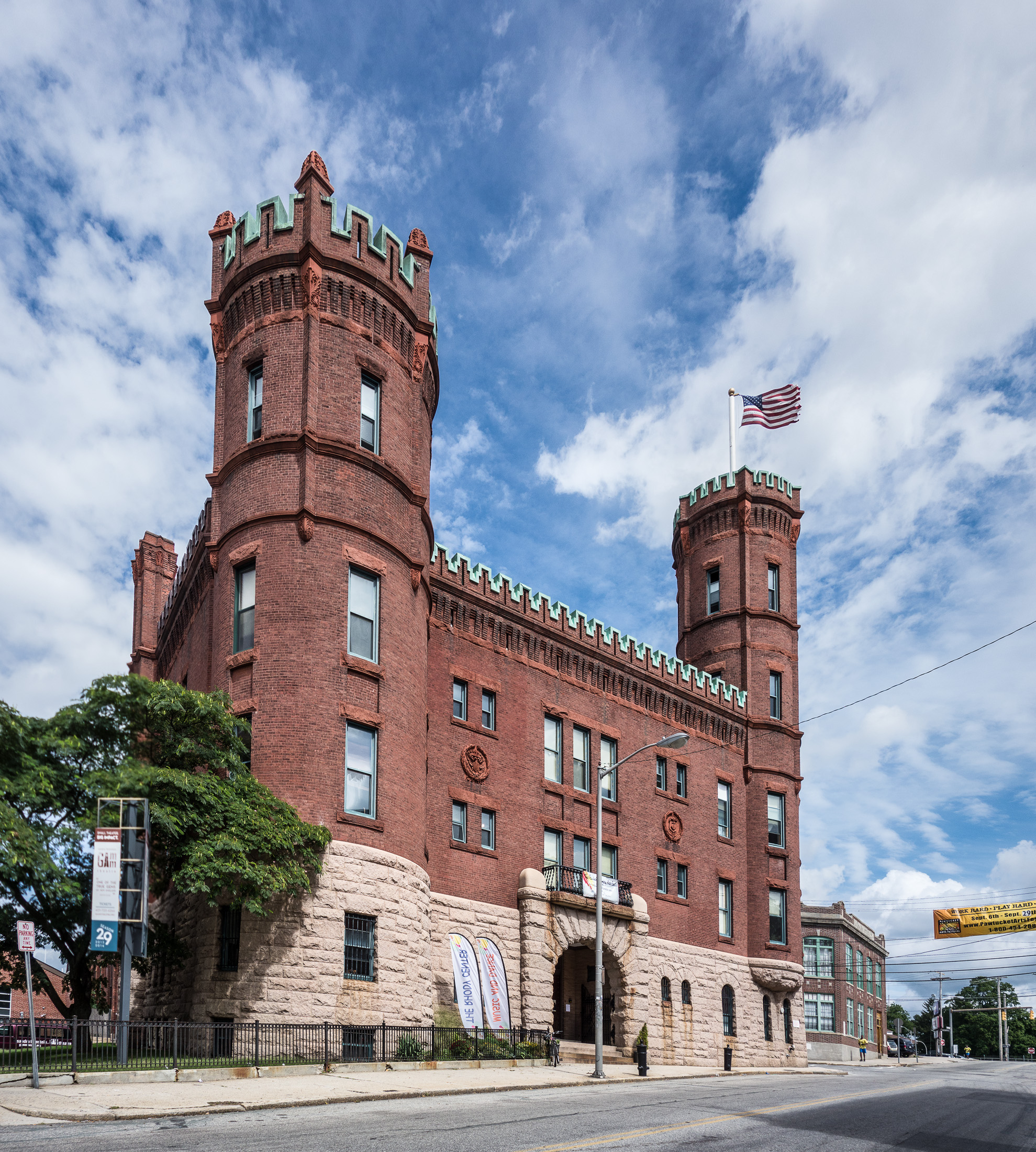
Pawtucket Armory Center for the Arts (former Pawtucket Armory), with The Sandra Feinstein-Gamm Theatre in annex

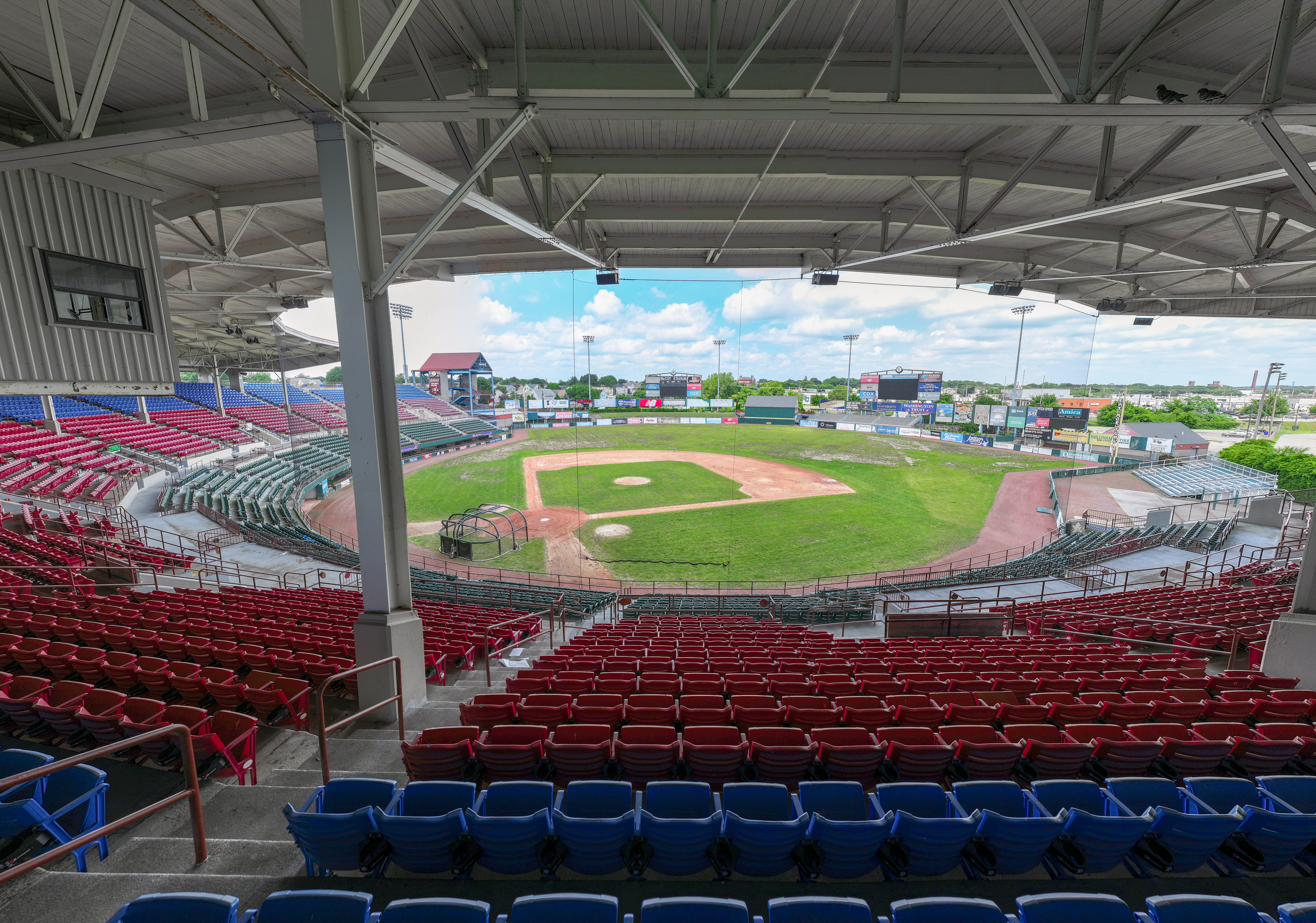
From 1970 to 2020, the Pawtucket Red Sox played at McCoy Stadium

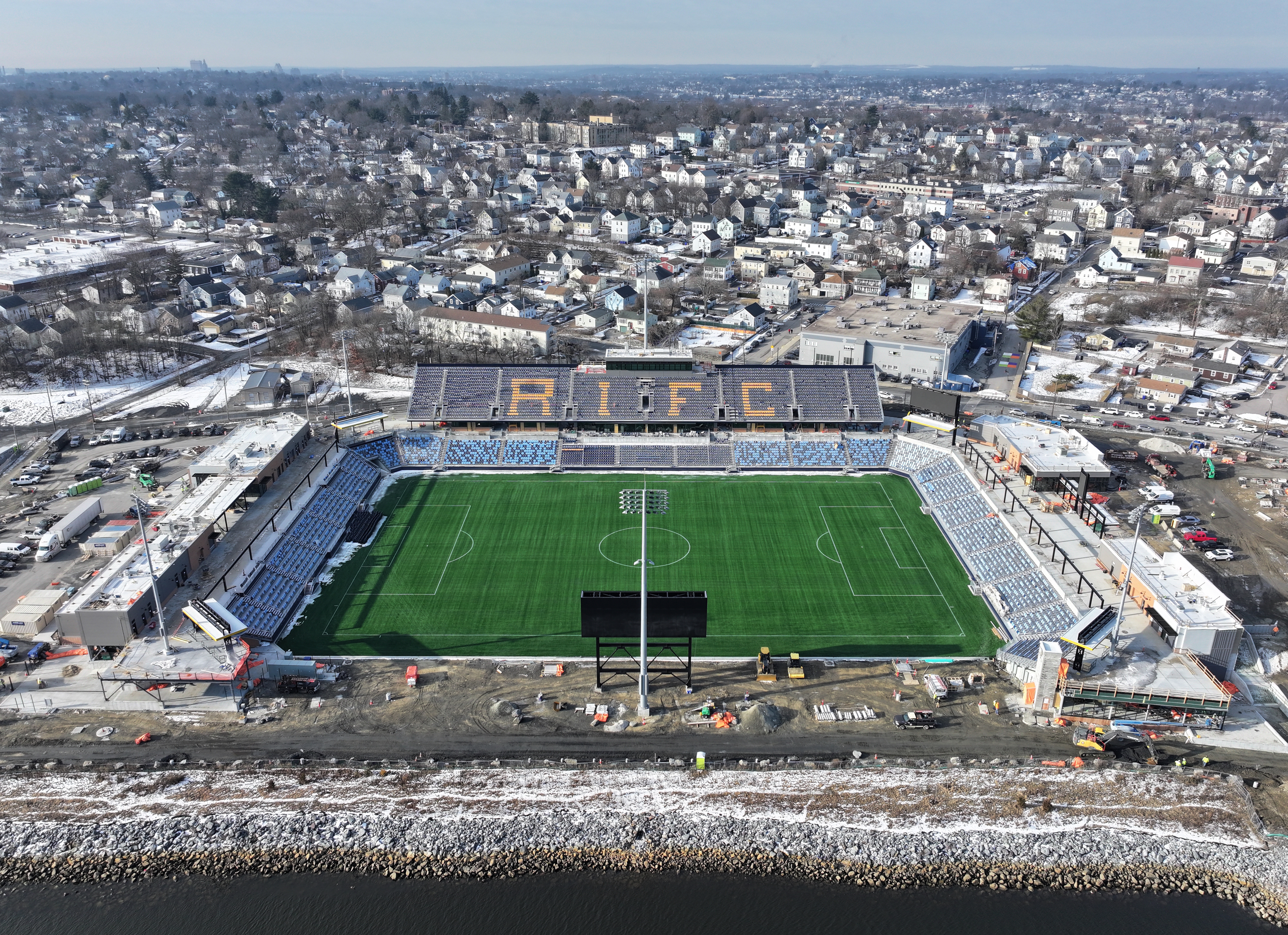
Centreville Bank Stadium under construction in 2025

== Parks and recreation ==
=== Parks ===
==== Slater Park ====
Slater Park is the city's largest park. It is located in Pawtucket's Darlington neighborhood. It features a variety of recreation facilities, including athletic fields, picnic areas, a disc golf course, an antique Looff carousel, gardens, bandstands, a playground, a dog park, and the historic Daggett House. The park is home to the Rhode Island Watercolor Society. There are multiple public art installations throughout the park.

Slater park hosts many community events throughout the year, including the Pawtucket Arts Festival, a "haunted tunnel" Halloween event, an annual winter holiday lights display, as well as various exercise classes, sports leagues, charity walks, and music and cultural performances.

==== Veterans Memorial Park ====
Veterans Memorial Park is a 20 acre park in Pawtucket's Fairlawn neighborhood. It is home to several athletic fields, picnic areas, a playground, a dog park, and an outdoor swimming pool.

==== Festival Pier ====
Festival Pier is a park located on the Seekonk River. It has picnic areas, a boat launch, and fishing areas. The park is home to the annual Rhode Island Dragon Boat Races and Taiwan Day Festival.

==== Other Parks and Playgrounds ====
The city is home to many other smaller parks and recreation facilities.

===== Playgrounds =====
Below are playgrounds administered by the Pawtucket Department of Parks and Recreation. Additionally, many of the city's public elementary schools have playgrounds on their campus.

Name	Location (Neighborhood)	Notes
Joseph Ayotte Park Playground	Quality Hill	
Barton Street Playground	Downtown	
John Street Playground	Darlington	
Payne Park Playground	Woodlawn	
San Bento Playground	Fairlawn	
Slater Park Adventure Playground	Darlington	Playground is located within Slater Park
Oakhill Playground	Oak Hill	

===== Other Parks =====
The city features 18 small passive parks, one skate park, and multiple athletic fields.

=== Multiuse Trails ===
Two multiuse trails pass through the city. Several small sections of the Blackstone River Bikeway have been completed within the city. The completed trail will connect Providence and Worcester, Massachusetts. This trail is part of the larger East Coast Greenway.

The Ten Mile River Greenway is a multiuse trail that parallels the Ten Mile River. through parts of Pawtucket and East Providence.

== Government ==
Pawtucket is governed by mayor-council government. The city council consists of nine elected councilmembers-- 3 at large councilors and 6 district councilors. City councilors in Pawtucket serve two year terms.

City Government
	Current Legislators	Incoming Legislators
Mayor	Donald Grebien (D)	Adam Greenman (D)
At-Large City Councilors	Michael A. Araujo (D), Roberto H. Moreno (D), Yesenia Rubio (D)	Michael A. Araujo (D), Roberto H. Moreno (D), Yesenia Rubio (D)
District Councilors	David P. Moran (D), Mark J. Wildenhain (D), Terrence E. Mercer (D), Neicy Coderre (D), Clovis C. Gregor (D), Marlena Martins Stachowiak (D)	David P. Moran (D), Mark J. Wildenhain (D), Terrence E. Mercer (D), Neicy Coderre (D), Clovis C. Gregor (D), Matthew P. Carvalho (D)

State Government
	Current Legislators
State Representatives:	Karen Alzate (D), Cherie L. Cruz (D), Leonela Felix (D), Jenni A. Furtado (D), Katherine S. Kazarian (D), Mary Messier (D), Mary Ann Shallcross Smith (D), Jennifer Stewart (D)
State Senators:	Jonathon Acosta (D), Robert Britto (D), Meghan E. Kallman (D), Lori Urso (D)

Federal Government
U.S. Representative:	Gabe Amo (D)
U.S. Senators:	Jack Reed (D), Sheldon Whitehouse (D)

== Education ==
Pawtucket public schools

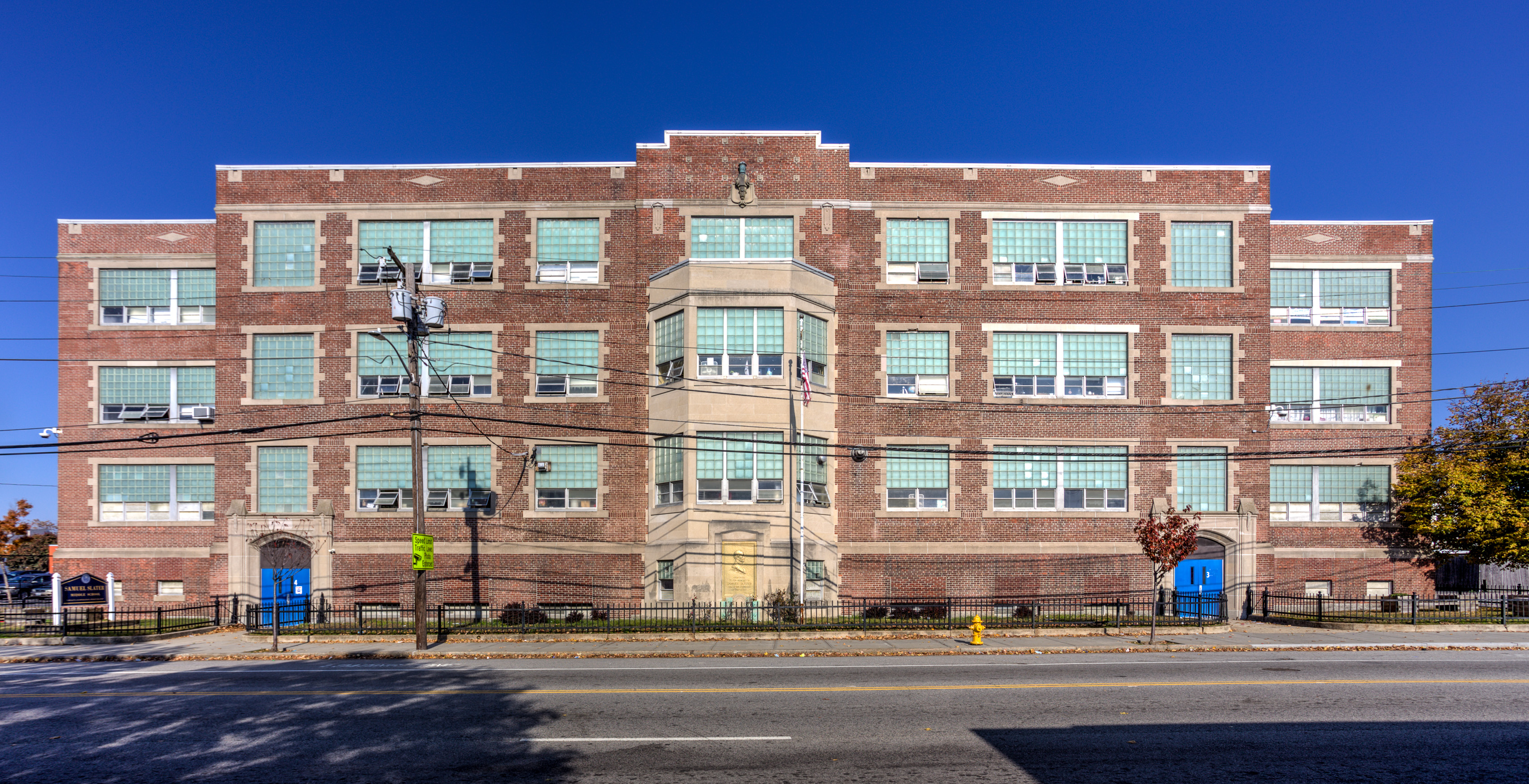
Samuel Slater Middle School

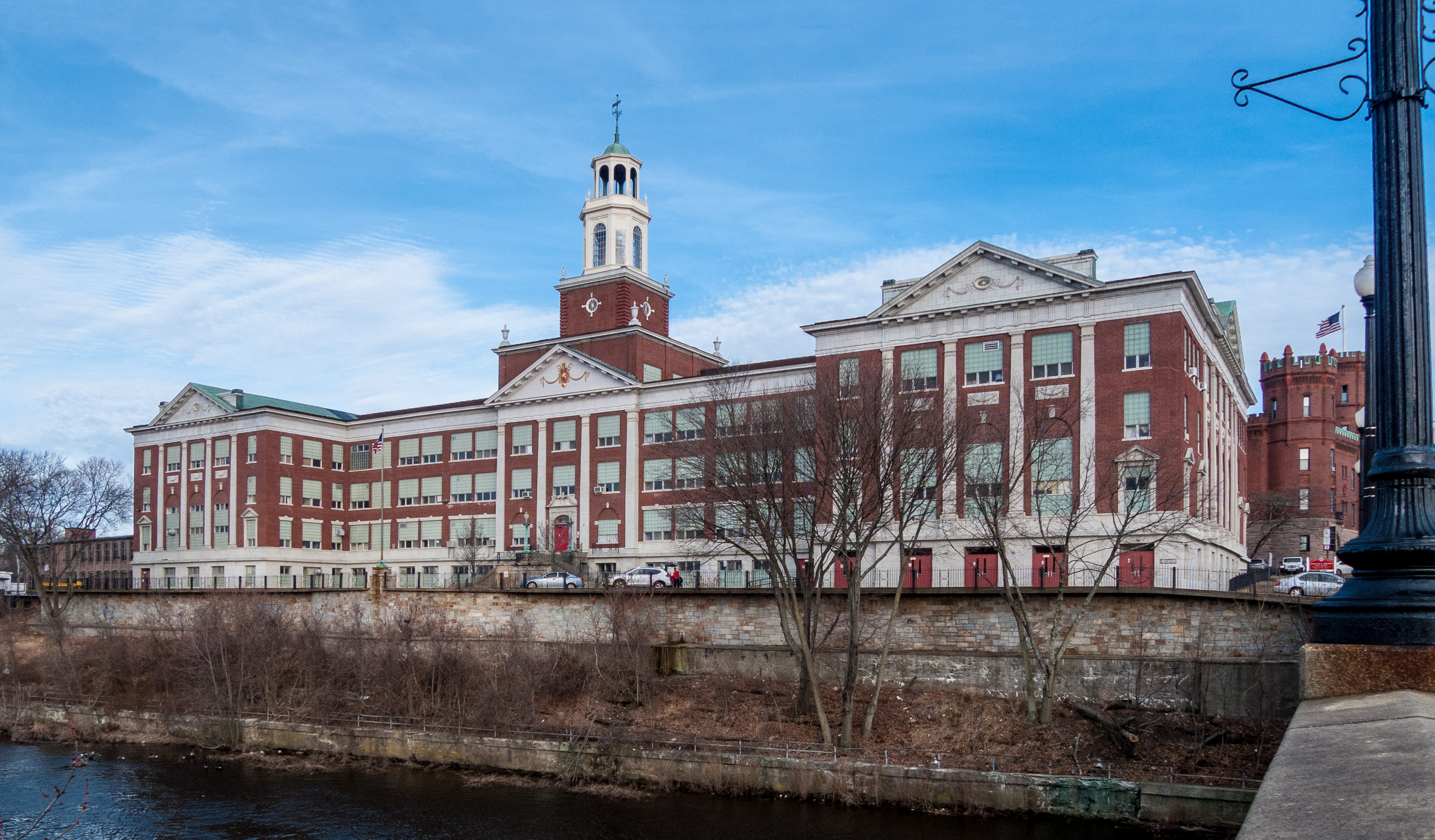
William E. Tolman High School

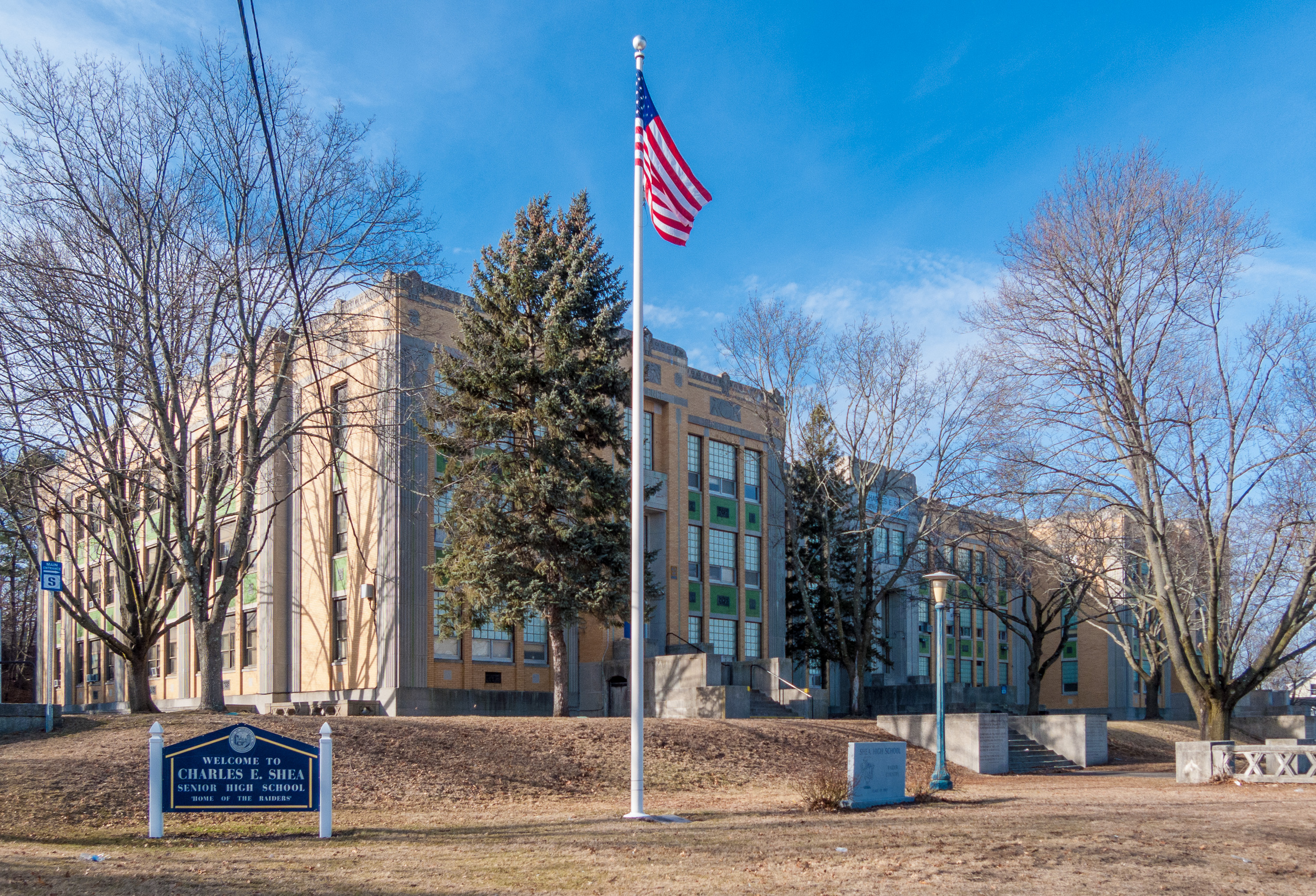
Shea High School

=== Public schools ===
Public education in Pawtucket is directed by the Pawtucket School Department and contains these schools:

==== Senior high schools ====
- Charles E. Shea
- William E. Tolman
- Blackstone Academy Charter School
- Jacqueline M Walsh School for the Arts

==== Middle schools ====
- Joseph Jenks
- Samuel Slater
- Lyman B. Goff

==== Elementary schools ====
- Elizabeth Baldwin
- M. Virginia Cunningham
- Flora S. Curtis
- Curvin McCabe
- Fallon Memorial
- Nathanael Greene
- Agnes E. Little
- Potter Burns
- Francis J. Varieur
- Henry J. Winters

=== Catholic schools ===
The Quality Hill section of Pawtucket is home to St. Raphael Academy. It is a private college preparatory school founded on the basis of St. John the Baptist de la Salle. "Saints" is a small school consisting of roughly 500 students with a student to teacher ratio of about 15:2. The "Saints and Lady Saints" are very successful in sports including baseball, football, basketball, and softball. St. Raphael Academy is a rival of William E. Tolman. The two schools took part in a Thanksgiving Day football game that was played in McCoy Stadium for over 70 years, though game is no longer played. William E. Tolman now competes annually against its fellow Pawtucket public high school Charles E. Shea, rather than against St. Raphael Academy, a private Catholic high school.

Pawtucket was home to Bishop Keough High School, a small all-girls Catholic high school in the Fairlawn neighborhood, until its closure in 2015.

The city also has three Catholic elementary schools: St. Cecilia School, St. Teresa School and Woodlawn Catholic Regional School.

== Infrastructure ==
=== Transportation ===
Pawtucket is served by several RIPTA local bus routes plus the R-Line.

Pawtucket/Central Falls station on the MBTA Commuter Rail Providence/Stoughton Line opened on January 23, 2023, replacing the former station that closed in 1981.

The What Cheer Airport operated in Pawtucket from 1928 until 1934. The state government considered making it Rhode Island's main airport, but eventually settled on the Hillsgrove Airfield in Warwick, now known as Rhode Island T. F. Green International Airport.

=== Highways and roads ===
I-95 and US 1 also traverse the western part of Pawtucket. Some of the slowest posted speeds on I-95 are in the city due to the "S-curves" near downtown. To preserve certain buildings in the city, planners snaked I-95, creating sharp bends in the highway.

==== Downtown Circulator ====
Pawtucket's Downtown Circulator was a one-way loop through downtown; it is similar to British concepts of ring roads. A similar concept was also tried in Providence.

The circulator used East Avenue, High Street, Summer Street, Goff Avenue, Dexter Street and Park Place West. Each half of the Circulator carried one direction of U.S. 1; sections also carried westbound Route 15 and northbound Route 114. It was signed with a big "C" on overhead signs.

There are no longer signs for the circulator, though the road configuration remains. Providence's Downtown Ring Roads have suffered a similar fate.

== Sister town ==
- Belper, Derbyshire, England, Belper was where Samuel Slater had been apprenticed to Jedediah Strutt, learning the secrets of Richard Arkwright's Water Frame. He is sometimes known in that area as "Slater the traitor". Belper holds an annual town festival in honor of Pawtucket and Belper being sister towns.
