= 2020 Rhode Island House of Representatives election =

Rhode Island House of Representatives election, 2020
- November 3, 2020

All 75 seats in the Rhode Island House of Representatives 38 seats needed for a majority
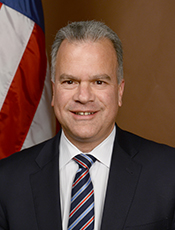

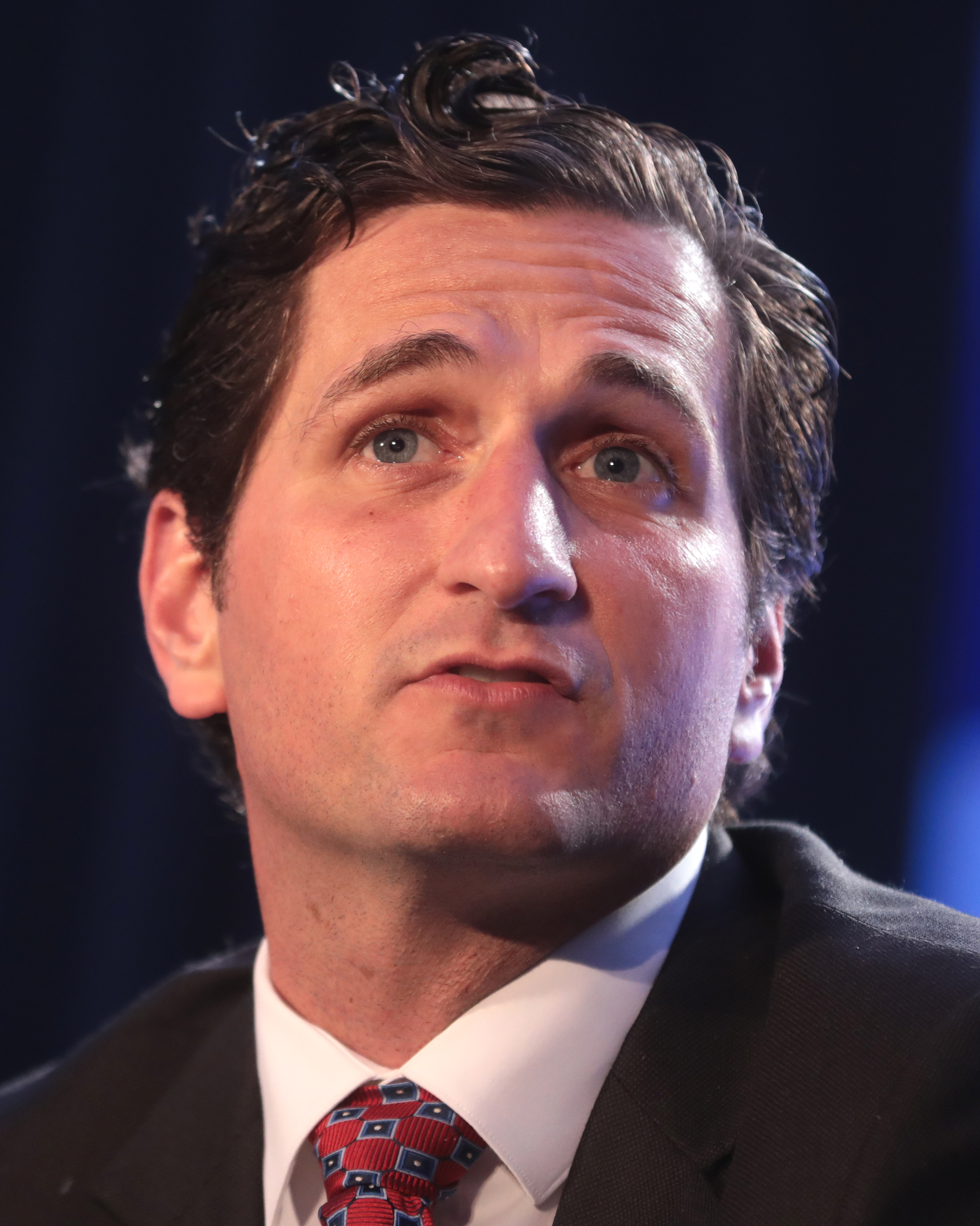
	Majority party	Minority party
Leader	Nicholas Mattiello (lost re-election)	Blake Filippi
Party	Democratic	Republican
Leader's seat	15th	38th
Seats before	66	8
Seats won	65	10
Seat change	▼1	▲2
Popular vote	310,198	100,135
Percentage	70.4%	22.7%
- Democratic gain Republican gain Democratic hold Republican hold
Speaker before election
Nicholas Mattiello
Democratic
Elected Speaker
Joe Shekarchi
Democratic

The 2020 Rhode Island House of Representatives elections took place as part of the biennial United States elections. Rhode Island voters elected all 75 state representatives. State representatives serve two-year terms in the Rhode Island House of Representatives. A primary election held on September 8, 2020, determined which candidates would appear on the November 3 general election ballot. All the members elected were to serve in the Rhode Island General Assembly.

== Results ==
District	Incumbent	Party	Elected representative	Party
1	Edith Ajello	Dem	Edith Ajello (Note: Unopposed in the general election.)	Dem
2	Christopher Blazejewski	Dem	Christopher Blazejewski	Dem
3	Moira Walsh	Dem	Nathan Biah	Dem
4	Rebecca Kislak	Dem	Rebecca Kislak	Dem
5	Marcia Ranglin-Vassell	Dem	Marcia Ranglin-Vassell	Dem
6	Raymond Hull	Dem	Raymond Hull	Dem
7	Daniel P. McKiernan	Dem	David Morales	Dem
8	John J. Lombardi	Dem	John J. Lombardi	Dem
9	Anastasia P. Williams	Dem	Anastasia P. Williams	Dem
10	Scott A. Slater	Dem	Scott A. Slater	Dem
11	Grace Diaz	Dem	Grace Diaz	Dem
12	Joseph Almeida	Dem	Jose Batista	Dem
13	Mario Mendez	Dem	Ramon Perez	Dem
14	Charlene Lima	Dem	Charlene Lima	Dem
15	Nicholas Mattiello	Dem	Barbara Ann Fenton-Fung	Rep
16	Christopher Millea	Dem	Brandon Potter	Dem
17	Robert Jacquard	Dem	Jacquelyn Baginski	Dem
18	Arthur Handy	Dem	Arthur Handy	Dem
19	Joseph McNamara	Dem	Joseph McNamara	Dem
20	David Bennett	Dem	David Bennett	Dem
21	Camille Vella-Wilkinson	Dem	Camille Vella-Wilkinson	Dem
22	Joseph J. Solomon Jr.	Dem	Joseph J. Solomon Jr.	Dem
23	Joe Shekarchi	Dem	Joe Shekarchi	Dem
24	Evan Shanley	Dem	Evan Shanley	Dem
25	Thomas Noret	Dem	Thomas Noret	Dem
26	James Jackson	Dem	Patricia Morgan	Rep
27	Patricia Serpa	Dem	Patricia Serpa	Dem
28	George Nardone	Rep	George Nardone	Rep
29	Sherry Roberts	Rep	Sherry Roberts	Rep
30	Justine Caldwell	Dem	Justine Caldwell	Dem
31	Julie Casimiro	Dem	Julie Casimiro	Dem
32	Robert Craven	Dem	Robert Craven	Dem
33	Carol McEntee	Dem	Carol McEntee	Dem
34	Teresa Tanzi	Dem	Teresa Tanzi	Dem
35	Kathleen A. Fogarty	Dem	Kathleen A. Fogarty	Dem
36	Blake Filippi	Rep	Blake Filippi	Rep
37	Samuel Azzinaro	Dem	Samuel Azzinaro	Dem
38	Brian Patrick Kennedy	Dem	Brian Patrick Kennedy	Dem
39	Justin K. Price	Rep	Justin K. Price	Rep
40	Michael Chippendale	Rep	Michael Chippendale	Rep
41	Robert Quattrocchi	Rep	Robert Quattrocchi	Rep
42	Stephen Ucci	Dem	Edward Cardillo	Dem
43	Deborah Fellela	Dem	Deborah Fellela	Dem
44	Gregory Costantino	Dem	Gregory Costantino	Dem
45	Mia Ackerman	Dem	Mia Ackerman	Dem
46	John Lyle Jr.	Ind (Note: Elected in 2018 as a Republican, left the party in June 2020.)	Mary Ann Shallcross Smith	Dem
47	David Place	Rep	David Place	Rep
48	Brian Newberry	Rep	Brian Newberry	Rep
49	Michael Morin	Dem	Steven Lima	Dem
50	Stephen Casey	Dem	Stephen Casey	Dem
51	Robert Phillips	Dem	Robert Phillips	Dem
52	Alex Marszalkowski	Dem	Alex Marszalkowski	Dem
53	Bernard Hawkins	Dem	Bernard Hawkins	Dem
54	William O'Brien	Dem	William O'Brien	Dem
55	Arthur Corvese	Dem	Arthur Corvese	Dem
56	Joshua Giraldo	Dem	Joshua Giraldo	Dem
57	James N. McLaughlin	Dem	James N. McLaughlin	Dem
58	Carlos E. Tobon	Dem	Carlos E. Tobon	Dem
59	Jean Philippe Barros	Dem	Jean Philippe Barros	Dem
60	Karen Alzate	Dem	Karen Alzate	Dem
61	Raymond Johnston	Dem	Leonela Felix	Dem
62	Mary Messier	Dem	Mary Messier	Dem
63	Katherine Kazarian	Dem	Katherine Kazarian	Dem
64	Jose Serodio	Dem	Brianna Henries	Dem
65	Gregg Amore	Dem	Gregg Amore	Dem
66	Liana Cassar	Dem	Liana Cassar	Dem
67	Jason Knight	Dem	Jason Knight	Dem
68	June Speakman	Dem	June Speakman	Dem
69	Susan R. Donovan	Dem	Susan R. Donovan	Dem
70	John Edwards	Dem	John Edwards	Dem
71	Dennis Canario	Dem	Michelle McGaw	Dem
72	Terri-Denise Cortvriend	Dem	Terri-Denise Cortvriend	Dem
73	Marvin Abney	Dem	Marvin Abney	Dem
74	Deb Ruggiero	Dem	Deb Ruggiero	Dem
75	Lauren H. Carson	Dem	Lauren H. Carson	Dem

== Retiring incumbents ==
Five incumbent representatives (all Democrats) did not appear on the September 8 primary ballot:

1. Joseph Almeida, District 12
2. Dennis Canario, District 36
3. Robert Jacquard, District 17
4. Michael Morin, District 49
5. Stephen Ucci, District 42

== Defeated incumbents ==
=== In primary ===
Six incumbent representatives (all Democrats) sought reelection but were defeated in the September 8 primary. With the exception of Walsh, the defeated were all beaten by progressive challengers who saw the incumbents as too conservative for the Democratic party.

1. Raymond Johnston (D), District 61
2. Daniel P. McKiernan (D), District 7
3. Mario Mendez (D), District 13
4. Christopher Millea (D), District 16
5. Jose Serodio (D), District 64
6. Moira Walsh (D), District 3

=== In general election ===
Three incumbent representatives (two Democrats and an independent) sought reelection but were defeated in the November 3 general election. Among them was House Speaker Nicholas Mattiello, who lost to Republican Barbara Ann Fenton-Fung.

1. James Jackson (D), District 26
2. John Lyle Jr. (I), District 46
3. Nicholas Mattiello (D), District 15

== Predictions ==
Source	Ranking	As of
The Cook Political Report	Safe D	October 21, 2020

== Detailed results ==
=== District 1 ===
- No other candidate filed for District 1.

District 1 general election, 2020
Party	Candidate	Votes	%
Democratic	Edith Ajello (incumbent)	3,942	97.2
Write-in	Write-ins	115	2.8
Total votes		4,057	100.0
Democratic hold			

=== District 2 ===
- No other candidate filed for District 2.

District 2 general election, 2020
Party	Candidate	Votes	%
Democratic	Christopher Blazejewski (incumbent)	4,125	97.5
Write-in	Write-ins	107	2.5
Total votes		4,232	100.0
Democratic hold			

=== District 3 ===
Democratic primary

District 3 Democratic primary
Party	Candidate	Votes	%
Democratic	Nathan Biah	491	64.8
Democratic	Moira Walsh (incumbent)	267	35.2
Total votes		758	100.0

General election

- No other candidate filed for District 3.

District 3 general election, 2020
Party	Candidate	Votes	%
Democratic	Nathan Biah	3,258	97.5
Write-in	Write-ins	84	2.5
Total votes		3,342	100.0
Democratic hold			

=== District 4 ===
District 4 general election, 2020
Party	Candidate	Votes	%
Democratic	Rebecca Kislak (incumbent)	6,328	86.8
Independent	Aryeh Yisrael Rosenfield	906	12.4
Write-in	Write-ins	54	0.7
Total votes		7,288	100.0
Democratic hold			

=== District 5 ===
District District 5 general election, 2020
Party	Candidate	Votes	%
Democratic	Marcia Ranglin-Vassell (incumbent)	2,981	73.8
Republican	Ronald Iacobbo	1,027	25.4
Write-in	Write-ins	29	0.7
Total votes		4,037	100.0
Democratic hold			

=== District 6 ===
District 6 general election, 2020
Party	Candidate	Votes	%
Democratic	Raymond Hull (incumbent)	4,046	77.3
Independent	Jorge Porras	1,147	21.9
Write-in	Write-ins	43	0.8
Total votes		5,236	100.0
Democratic hold			

=== District 7 ===
Democratic primary

District 7 Democratic primary
Party	Candidate	Votes	%
Democratic	David Morales	875	49.4
Democratic	Daniel P. McKiernan (incumbent)	493	27.8
Democratic	Angel Subervi	403	22.8
Total votes		1,771	100.0

General election

- No other candidate filed for District 7.

District 7 general election, 2020
Party	Candidate	Votes	%
Democratic	David Morales	4,067	96.0
Write-in	Write-ins	170	4.0
Total votes		4,237	100.0
Democratic hold			

=== District 8 ===
Democratic primary

District 8 Democratic primary
Party	Candidate	Votes	%
Democratic	John J. Lombardi (incumbent)	1,098	90.1
Democratic	Darwin Castro	121	9.9
Total votes		1,219	100.0

General election

- No other candidate filed for District 8.

District 8 general election, 2020
Party	Candidate	Votes	%
Democratic	John J. Lombardi (incumbent)	3,766	98.2
Write-in	Write-ins	70	1.8
Total votes		3,836	100.0
Democratic hold			

=== District 9 ===
District 9 general election, 2020
Party	Candidate	Votes	%
Democratic	Anastasia P. Williams (incumbent)	2,513	73.0
Independent	Rosa Marie Hill	899	26.1
Write-in	Write-ins	32	0.9
Total votes		3,444	100.0
Democratic hold			

=== District 10 ===
No other candidate filed for District 10.

District 10 general election, 2020
Party	Candidate	Votes	%
Democratic	Scott A. Slater (incumbent)	3,044	97.3
Write-in	Write-ins	84	2.7
Total votes		3,128	100.0
Democratic hold			

=== District 11 ===
Democratic primary

District 11 Democratic primary
Party	Candidate	Votes	%
Democratic	Grace Diaz (incumbent)	730	72.6
Democratic	Laura Perez	276	27.4
Total votes		1,006	100.0

General election

District 11 general election, 2020
Party	Candidate	Votes	%
Democratic	Grace Diaz (incumbent)	3,350	85.9
Independent	Emmanuel Nyema	513	13.1
Write-in	Write-ins	39	1.0
Total votes		3,902	100.0
Democratic hold			

=== District 12 ===
Democratic primary

District 12 Democratic primary
Party	Candidate	Votes	%
Democratic	Jose F. Batista	589	56.3
Democratic	Carlos Cedeno	457	43.7
Total votes		1,046	100.0

General election

- No other candidate filed for District 12.

District 12 general election, 2020
Party	Candidate	Votes	%
Democratic	Jose F. Batista	3,071	97.8
Write-in	Write-ins	69	2.2
Total votes		3,140	100.0
Democratic hold			

=== District 13 ===
Democratic primary

District 13 Democratic primary
Party	Candidate	Votes	%
Democratic	Ramon A. Perez	761	67.0
Democratic	Mario Mendez (incumbent)	240	21.1
Democratic	Janice Falconer	135	11.9
Total votes		1,136	100.0

General election

- No other candidate filed for District 13.

District 13 general election, 2020
Party	Candidate	Votes	%
Democratic	Ramon A. Perez	2,832	80.8
Write-in	Write-ins	675	19.2
Total votes		3,507	100.0
Democratic hold			

=== District 14 ===
- No other candidate filed for District 14.

District 14 general election, 2020
Party	Candidate	Votes	%
Democratic	Charlene Lima (incumbent)	3,774	96.8
Write-in	Write-ins	123	3.2
Total votes		3,897	100.0
Democratic hold			

=== District 15 ===
District 15 general election, 2020
Party	Candidate	Votes	%
Republican	Barbara Ann Fenton-Fung	4,731	58.6
Democratic	Nicholas Mattiello (incumbent)	3,315	41.0
Write-in	Write-ins	32	0.4
Total votes			100.0
Republican gain from Democratic			

=== District 16 ===
Democratic primary

District 16 Democratic primary
Party	Candidate	Votes	%
Democratic	Brandon Potter	1,004	59.8
Democratic	Christopher Millea (incumbent)	675	40.2
Total votes		1,679	100.0

General election

District 16 general election, 2020
Party	Candidate	Votes	%
Democratic	Brandon Potter	4,144	53.7
Republican	Maryann Lancia	3,559	46.1
Write-in	Write-ins	16	0.2
Total votes		7,719	100.0
Democratic hold			

=== District 17 ===
- No other candidate filed for District 17.

District 17 general election, 2020
Party	Candidate	Votes	%
Democratic	Jacquelyn Baginski	5,125	96.1
Write-in	Write-ins	208	3.9
Total votes		5,333	100.0
Democratic hold			

=== District 18 ===
- No other candidate filed for District 18.

District 18 general election, 2020
Party	Candidate	Votes	%
Democratic	Arthur Handy (incumbent)	5,350	96.0
Write-in	Write-ins	221	4.0
Total votes		5,571	100.0
Democratic hold			

=== District 19 ===
Democratic primary

District 19 Democratic primary
Party	Candidate	Votes	%
Democratic	Joseph McNamara (incumbent)	1,421	62.4
Democratic	Stuart Wilson	856	37.6
Total votes		2,277	100.0

General election

District 19 general election, 2020
Party	Candidate	Votes	%
Democratic	Joseph McNamara (incumbent)	5,107	63.2
Independent	Patrick Maloney Jr.	2,947	36.5
Write-in	Write-ins	31	0.4
Total votes		8,085	100.0
Democratic hold			

=== District 20 ===
- No other candidate filed for District 20.

District 20 general election, 2020
Party	Candidate	Votes	%
Democratic	David Bennett (incumbent)	4,543	94.6
Write-in	Write-ins	259	5.4
Total votes		4,802	100.0
Democratic hold			

=== District 21 ===
District 21 general election, 2020
Party	Candidate	Votes	%
Democratic	Camille Vella-Wilkinson (incumbent)	4,140	59.3
Republican	Ronald Loparto	2,814	40.3
Write-in	Write-ins	32	0.5
Total votes		6,986	100.0
Democratic hold			

=== District 22 ===
District 22 general election, 2020
Party	Candidate	Votes	%
Democratic	Joseph J. Solomon Jr. (incumbent)	3,570	52.2
Independent	Gerald Carbone	3,213	46.9
Write-in	Write-ins	62	0.9
Total votes		6,845	100.0
Democratic hold			

=== District 23 ===
- No other candidates filed for District 23.

District 23 general election, 2020
Party	Candidate	Votes	%
Democratic	Joe Shekarchi (incumbent)	5,412	94.3
Write-in	Write-ins	329	5.7
Total votes		5,741	100.0
Democratic hold			

=== District 24 ===
- No other candidate filed for District 24.

District 24 general election, 2020
Party	Candidate	Votes	%
Democratic	Evan Shanley (incumbent)	6,320	94.7
Write-in	Write-ins	352	5.3
Total votes		6,672	100.0
Democratic hold			

=== District 25 ===
- No other candidate filed for District 25.

District 25 general election, 2020
Party	Candidate	Votes	%
Democratic	Thomas Noret (incumbent)	4,122	94.7
Write-in	Write-ins	230	5.3
Total votes		4,352	100.0
Democratic hold			

=== District 26 ===
District 26 general election, 2020
Party	Candidate	Votes	%
Republican	Patricia Morgan	3,620	54.3
Democratic	James Jackson (incumbent)	3,028	45.4
Write-in	Write-ins	15	0.2
Total votes		6,663	100.0
Republican gain from Democratic			

=== District 27 ===
Democratic primary

District 27 Democratic primary
Party	Candidate	Votes	%
Democratic	Patricia Serpa (incumbent)	931	70.3
Democratic	Nicholas Delmenico	394	29.7
Total votes		1,325	100.0

General election

- No other candidate filed for District 27.

District 27 general election, 2020
Party	Candidate	Votes	%
Democratic	Patricia Serpa (incumbent)	5,805	94.6
Write-in	Write-ins	331	5.4
Total votes		6,136	100.0
Democratic hold			

=== District 28 ===
District 28 general election, 2020
Party	Candidate	Votes	%
Republican	George Nardone (incumbent)	4,641	58.4
Democratic	Scott Guthrie	3,301	41.5
Write-in	Write-ins	10	0.1
Total votes		7,952	100.0
Republican hold			

=== District 29 ===
- No other candidate filed for District 29.

District 29 general election, 2020
Party	Candidate	Votes	%
Republican	Sherry Roberts (incumbent)	6,506	96.7
Write-in	Write-ins	225	3.3
Total votes		6,731	100.0
Republican hold			

=== District 30 ===
District 30 general election, 2020
Party	Candidate	Votes	%
Democratic	Justine Caldwell (incumbent)	4,822	52.1
Republican	Antonio Giarrusso	4,430	47.8
Write-in	Write-ins	12	0.1
Total votes		9,264	100.0
Democratic hold			

=== District 31 ===
- No other candidate filed for District 31.

District 31 general election, 2020
Party	Candidate	Votes	%
Democratic	Julie Casimiro (incumbent)	6,314	95.0
Write-in	Write-ins	335	5.0
Total votes		6,649	100.0
Democratic hold			

=== District 32 ===
- No other candidate filed for District 32.

District 32 general election, 2020
Party	Candidate	Votes	%
Democratic	Robert Craven (incumbent)	6,764	95.2
Write-in	Write-ins	342	4.8
Total votes		7,106	100.0
Democratic hold			

=== District 33 ===
- No other candidate filed for District 33.

District 33 general election, 2020
Party	Candidate	Votes	%
Democratic	Carol McEntee (incumbent)	6,189	96.0
Write-in	Write-ins	261	4.0
Total votes		6,450	100.0
Democratic hold			

=== District 34 ===
- No other candidate filed for District 34.

District 34 general election, 2020
Party	Candidate	Votes	%
Democratic	Teresa Tanzi (incumbent)	5,532	94.2
Write-in	Write-ins	338	5.8
Total votes		5,870	100.0
Democratic hold			

Reform Party candidate Tony Jones intended to run for State Representative in District 34 but did not successfully file.

=== District 35 ===
Democratic primary

District 35 Democratic primary
Party	Candidate	Votes	%
Democratic	Kathleen A. Fogarty (incumbent)	1,182	75.7
Democratic	Spencer Dickinson	379	24.3
Total votes		1,561	100.0

General election

- No other candidate filed for District 35.

District 35 general election, 2020
Party	Candidate	Votes	%
Democratic	Kathleen A. Fogarty (incumbent)	4,386	95.6
Write-in	Write-ins	202	4.4
Total votes		4,588	100.0
Democratic hold			

=== District 36 ===
- No other candidate filed for District 36.

District 36 general election, 2020
Party	Candidate	Votes	%
Republican	Blake Filippi (incumbent)	6,527	95.4
Write-in	Write-ins	318	4.6
Total votes		6,845	100.0
Republican hold			

=== District 37 ===
District 37 general election, 2020
Party	Candidate	Votes	%
Democratic	Samuel Azzinaro (incumbent)	5,339	69.4
Independent	Timothy McLaughlin Jr.	2,317	30.1
Write-in	Write-ins	33	0.4
Total votes		7,689	100.0
Democratic hold			

=== District 38 ===
Democratic primary

District 38 Democratic primary
Party	Candidate	Votes	%
Democratic	Brian Patrick Kennedy (incumbent)	519	65.1
Democratic	Miguel Torres	278	34.9
Total votes		767	100.0

General election

District 38 general election, 2020
Party	Candidate	Votes	%
Democratic	Brian Patrick Kennedy (incumbent)	4,128	58.1
Republican	Donald Kohlman II	2,952	41.6
Write-in	Write-ins	20	0.3
Total votes		7,100	100.0
Democratic hold			

=== District 39 ===
District 39 general election, 2020
Party	Candidate	Votes	%
Republican	Justin K. Price (incumbent)	4,181	52.0
Democratic	Megan L. Cotter	3,859	48.0
Write-in	Write-ins	5	0.1
Total votes		8,045	100.0
Republican hold			

=== District 40 ===
District 40 general election, 2020
Party	Candidate	Votes	%
Republican	Michael Chippendale (incumbent)	5,545	66.1
Democratic	Linda Nichols	2,834	33.8
Write-in	Write-ins	10	0.1
Total votes		8,389	100.0
Republican hold			

=== District 41 ===
Democratic primary

District 41 Democratic primary
Party	Candidate	Votes	%
Democratic	Pamela Carosi	549	79.9
Democratic	Giuseppe Mattiello	138	20.1
Total votes		687	100.0

General election

District 41 general election, 2020
Party	Candidate	Votes	%
Republican	Robert Quattrocchi (incumbent)	5,739	64.7
Democratic	Pamela Carosi	3,121	35.2
Write-in	Write-ins	14	0.2
Total votes		8,874	100.0
Republican hold			

=== District 42 ===
District 42 general election, 2020
Party	Candidate	Votes	%
Democratic	Edward Cardillo	3,510	50.7
Republican	Frank Ricci	3,399	49.1
Write-in	Write-ins	16	0.2
Total votes		6,925	100.0
Democratic hold			

=== District 43 ===
Democratic primary

District 43 Democratic primary
Party	Candidate	Votes	%
Democratic	Deborah Fellela (incumbent)	1,013	63.0
Democratic	Melinda Lopez	594	37.0
Total votes		1,607	100.0

General election

District District 43 general election, 2020
Party	Candidate	Votes	%
Democratic	Deborah Fellela (incumbent)	4,004	58.0
Republican	Nicola Antonio Grasso	2,856	41.3
Write-in	Write-ins	48	0.7
Total votes		6,908	100.0
Democratic hold			

=== District 44 ===
- No other candidate filed for District 44.

District 44 general election, 2020
Party	Candidate	Votes	%
Democratic	Gregory Costantino (incumbent)	6,409	94.7
Write-in	Write-ins	360	5.3
Total votes		6,769	100.0
Democratic hold			

=== District 45 ===
- No other candidate filed for District 45.

District 45 general election, 2020
Party	Candidate	Votes	%
Democratic	Mia Ackerman (incumbent)	5,751	95.1
Write-in	Write-ins	294	4.9
Total votes		6,045	100.0
Democratic hold			

=== District 46 ===
District 46 general election, 2020
Party	Candidate	Votes	%
Democratic	Mary Ann Shallcross Smith	3,162	39.3
Independent	John Lyle Jr. (incumbent)	2,556	31.8
Republican	John Cullen	2,311	28.7
Write-in	Write-ins	20	0.2
Total votes		8,049	100.0
Democratic gain from Independent			

=== District 47 ===
No other candidate filed for District 47.

District 47 general election, 2020
Party	Candidate	Votes	%
Republican	David Place (incumbent)	5,890	95.9
Write-in	Write-ins	249	4.1
Total votes		6,139	100.0
Republican hold			

=== District 48 ===
No other candidate filed for District 48.

District 48 general election, 2020
Party	Candidate	Votes	%
Republican	Brian Newberry (incumbent)	6,563	97.1
Write-in	Write-ins	199	2.9
Total votes		6,762	100.0
Republican hold			

=== District 49 ===
District 49 general election, 2020
Party	Candidate	Votes	%
Democratic	Steven Lima	2,154	63.5
Independent	Vincent Bono	1,219	35.9
Write-in	Write-ins	19	1.0
Total votes		3,392	100.0
Democratic hold			

=== District 50 ===
- No other candidate filed for District 50.

District 50 general election, 2020
Party	Candidate	Votes	%
Democratic	Stephen Casey	3,700	95.8
Write-in	Write-ins	161	4.2
Total votes		3,861	100.0
Democratic hold			

=== District 51 ===
- No other candidate filed for District 51.

District 51 general election, 2020
Party	Candidate	Votes	%
Democratic	Robert Phillips	3,933	96.3
Write-in	Write-ins	150	3.7
Total votes		4,083	100.0
Democratic hold			

=== District 52 ===
District 52 general election, 2020
Party	Candidate	Votes	%
Democratic	Alex Marszalkowski (incumbent)	4,476	51.1
Republican	Christopher Hogan	3,740	42.7
Independent	Daniel Baglini	533	6.1
Write-in	Write-ins	4	0.0
Total votes		8,753	100.0
Democratic hold			

=== District 53 ===
District 53 general election, 2020
Party	Candidate	Votes	%
Democratic	Bernard Hawkins (incumbent)	3,480	50.5
Republican	Brian Rea	3,391	49.2
Write-in	Write-ins	17	0.2
Total votes		6,888	100.0
Democratic hold			

=== District 54 ===
No other candidate filed for District 54.

District 54 general election, 2020
Party	Candidate	Votes	%
Democratic	William O'Brien (incumbent)	5,480	96.5
Write-in	Write-ins	197	3.5
Total votes		5,677	100.0
Democratic hold			

=== District 55 ===
- No other candidate filed for District 55.

District 55 general election, 2020
Party	Candidate	Votes	%
Democratic	Arthur Corvese (incumbent)	5,872	96.6
Write-in	Write-ins	205	3.4
Total votes		6,077	100.0
Democratic hold			

=== District 56 ===
- No other candidate filed for District 56.

District 56 general election, 2020
Party	Candidate	Votes	%
Democratic	Joshua Giraldo (incumbent)	2,267	97.5
Write-in	Write-ins	59	2.5
Total votes		2,326	100.0
Democratic hold			

=== District 57 ===
- No other candidate filed for District 57.

District 57 general election, 2020
Party	Candidate	Votes	%
Democratic	James N. McLaughlin (incumbent)	4,495	97.3
Write-in	Write-ins	127	2.7
Total votes		4,622	100.0
Democratic hold			

=== District 58 ===
- No other candidate filed for District 58.

District 58 general election, 2020
Party	Candidate	Votes	%
Democratic	Carlos Tobon (incumbent)	3,496	96.7
Write-in	Write-ins	118	3.3
Total votes		3,614	100.0
Democratic hold			

=== District 59 ===
No other candidate filed for District 59.

District 59 general election, 2020
Party	Candidate	Votes	%
Democratic	Jean Philippe Barros (incumbent)	4,139	97.7
Write-in	Write-ins	99	2.3
Total votes		4,238	100.0
Democratic hold			

=== District 60 ===
- No other candidate filed for District 60.

District 60 general election, 2020
Party	Candidate	Votes	%
Democratic	Karen Alzate (incumbent)	3,510	96.9
Write-in	Write-ins	114	3.1
Total votes		3,624	100.0
Democratic hold			

=== District 61 ===
Democratic primary

District 61 Democratic primary
Party	Candidate	Votes	%
Democratic	Leonela Felix	988	58.6
Democratic	Raymond Johnston (incumbent)	697	41.4
Total votes		1,685	100.0

General election

District 61 general election, 2020
Party	Candidate	Votes	%
Democratic	Leonela Felix	3,497	63.8
Republican	Robert Wheeler III	1,973	36.0
Write-in	Write-ins	12	0.2
Total votes		5,482	100.0
Democratic hold			

=== District 62 ===
- No other candidate filed for District 62.

District 62 general election, 2020
Party	Candidate	Votes	%
Democratic	Mary Messier (incumbent)	4,449	96.6
Write-in	Write-ins	158	3.4
Total votes		4,607	100.0
Democratic hold			

=== District 63 ===
- No other candidate filed for District 63.

District 63 general election, 2020
Party	Candidate	Votes	%
Democratic	Katherine Kazarian (incumbent)	5,740	95.9
Write-in	Write-ins	247	4.1
Total votes		5,987	100.0
Democratic hold			

=== District 64 ===
Democratic primary

District 64 Democratic primary
Party	Candidate	Votes	%
Democratic	Brianna Henries	727	61.6
Democratic	Jose Serodio (incumbent)	453	38.4
Total votes		1,180	100.0

General election

- No other candidate filed for District 64.

District 64 general election, 2020
Party	Candidate	Votes	%
Democratic	Brianna Henries	4,264	95.2
Write-in	Write-ins	215	4.8
Total votes		4,479	100.0
Democratic hold			

=== District 65 ===
- No other candidate filed for District 65.

District 65 general election, 2020
Party	Candidate	Votes	%
Democratic	Gregg Amore (incumbent)	5,691	96.1
Write-in	Write-ins	231	3.9
Total votes		5,922	100.0
Democratic hold			

=== District 66 ===
- No other candidate filed for District 66.

District 66 general election, 2020
Party	Candidate	Votes	%
Democratic	Liana Cassar (incumbent)	6,613	95.5
Write-in	Write-ins	308	4.5
Total votes		6,921	100.0
Democratic hold			

=== District 67 ===
- No other candidate filed for District 67.

District 67 general election, 2020
Party	Candidate	Votes	%
Democratic	Jason Knight (incumbent)	6,050	95.2
Write-in	Write-ins	302	4.8
Total votes		6,352	100.0
Democratic hold			

=== District 68 ===
District 68 general election, 2020
Party	Candidate	Votes	%
Democratic	June Speakman (incumbent)	4,373	59.0
Libertarian	William Hunt Jr.	2,992	40.4
Write-in	Write-ins	41	0.1
Total votes		7,406	100.0
Democratic hold			

=== District 69 ===
District 69 general election, 2020
Party	Candidate	Votes	%
Democratic	Susan R. Donovan (incumbent)	3,421	58.0
Republican	Ann Costa	2,458	41.7
Write-in	Write-ins	17	0.3
Total votes		5,896	100.0
Democratic hold			

=== District 70 ===
General election

District 70 general election, 2020
Party	Candidate	Votes	%
Democratic	John Edwards (incumbent)	4,563	61.8
Republican	Christopher Borden	2,794	37.9
Write-in	Write-ins	21	0.3
Total votes		7,378	100.0
Democratic hold			

=== District 71 ===
Democratic primary

District 71 Democratic primary
Party	Candidate	Votes	%
Democratic	Michelle McGaw	1,234	79.9
Democratic	John Edwards V	311	20.1
Total votes		1,545	100.0

General election

District 71 general election, 2020
Party	Candidate	Votes	%
Democratic	Michelle McGaw	4,603	56.1
Republican	Amy Veri	3,152	38.4
Independent	Nathan Melvin	440	5.4
Write-in	Write-ins	12	0.1
Total votes		8,207	100.0
Democratic hold			

=== District 72 ===
Democratic primary

District 72 Democratic primary
Party	Candidate	Votes	%
Democratic	Terri-Denise Cortvriend (incumbent)	1,195	80.7
Democratic	Christopher Semonelli	286	19.3
Total votes		1,481	100.0

General election

District 72 general election, 2020
Party	Candidate	Votes	%
Democratic	Terri-Denise Cortvriend (incumbent)	4,781	57.6
Republican	Kenneth Mendonca	3,517	42.3
Write-in	Write-ins	9	0.1
Total votes		8,307	100.0
Democratic hold			

=== District 73 ===
- No other candidate filed for District 73.

District 73 general election, 2020
Party	Candidate	Votes	%
Democratic	Marvin Abney (incumbent)	4,395	97.6
Write-in	Write-ins	106	2.4
Total votes		4,501	100.0
Democratic hold			

=== District 74 ===
Democratic primary

District 74 Democratic primary
Party	Candidate	Votes	%
Democratic	Deb Ruggiero (incumbent)	1,572	86.5
Democratic	Henry Lombardi Jr.	246	13.5
Total votes		1,818	100.0

General election

- No other candidate filed for District 74.

District 74 general election, 2020
Party	Candidate	Votes	%
Democratic	Deb Ruggiero (incumbent)	6,110	96.4
Write-in	Write-ins	228	3.6
Total votes		6,338	100.0
Democratic hold			

=== District 75 ===
District 37 general election, 2020
Party	Candidate	Votes	%
Democratic	Lauren H. Carson (incumbent)	4,143	69.4
Republican	Timothy McLaughlin Jr.	1,819	30.5
Write-in	Write-ins	7	0.1
Total votes		5,969	100.0
Democratic hold			

== See also ==
- 2020 United States elections
- 2020 United States presidential election in Rhode Island
- 2020 United States Senate election in Rhode Island
- 2020 United States House of Representatives elections in Rhode Island
- 2020 Rhode Island Senate election
