= James McLaughlin =

James or Jim McLaughlin may refer to:

== Politics ==
- James Wellington McLaughlin (1840–1903), Ontario doctor and political figure
- James McLaughlin (Indian agent) (1842–1923), Indian agent for the U.S. federal government in the Dakotas
- James C. McLaughlin (1858–1932), politician from the U.S. state of Michigan
- James N. McLaughlin (born 1943), member of the Rhode Island House of Representatives

== Sports ==
- J. H. McLaughlin (1844–1905), American wrestler
- Jim McLaughlin (jockey) (1861–1927), American thoroughbred race horse jockey
- Jim McLaughlin (pitcher/outfielder) (1860–1895), baseball player for the 1884 Baltimore Orioles
- Kid McLaughlin (James Anson McLaughlin, 1888–1934), baseball player for the 1914 Cincinnati Reds
- Jim McLaughlin (third baseman) (1902–1968), baseball player for the 1932 St. Louis Browns
- Jim McLaughlin (footballer) (1940–2024), footballer and football manager in the League of Ireland
- Jim McLaughlin (coach) (born 1960), American volleyball coach
- James McLaughlin (cyclist) (born 1990), Guernsey road racing cyclist
- Jimmy McLaughlin (American soccer) (born 1993), American soccer player

== Other ==
- James E. McLaughlin (1873–1966), Canadian-American architect
- James W. McLaughlin (1834–1923), American architect
- James McLaughlin (actor), early 20th-century American actor and director

== See also ==
- James McLoughlin (1929–2005), Irish Catholic Bishop
- J. Fairfax McLaughlin (disambiguation)
