= Laurence Ehrhardt =

Former member of the Rhode Island House of Representatives

Member of the Rhode Island House of Representatives from the 32nd district
- In office January 4, 2005 – January 1, 2013
- Preceded by: Melvoid Benson
- Succeeded by: Robert Craven

Personal details
- Born: May 20, 1940 (age 86)
- Party: Republican
- Education: Yale University (BA); Harvard University (MBA)

Laurence White Ehrhardt (born May 20, 1940) is an American politician and former member of the Rhode Island General Assembly. A Republican, Ehrhardt represented the town of North Kingstown, Rhode Island in the Rhode Island House of Representatives from 2005 until 2013.

== Early life and career ==
Ehrhardt was born on May 20, 1940. He attended Yale University where he received a Bachelor of Arts in 1961. Ehrhardt went on to attend Harvard University where he graduated with a Master of Business Administration. Ehrhardt served in the U.S. Navy until 1970, achieving the rank of lieutenant.

== Political career ==
Ehrhardt first ran for a seat in the Rhode Island House of Representatives in 2002, challenging incumbent representative Melvoid Benson. Ehrhardt lost in the general election by 35 votes.

In 2004, Ehrhardt ran again for the Rhode Island House of Representatives, this time winning the election and defeating Democratic opponent David W. Ashley with just over 71 votes. Ehrhardt was re-elected in the 2006 general election, defeating Democratic opponent Richard A. Welch with 248 votes. Ehrhardt was again re-elected in 2008, defeating Democratic opponent Mark A. Plympton in the general election with 579 votes. In the 2010 general election, Ehrhardt again faced Welch and was overwhelmingly victorious, receiving 3,537 votes (61.1%) to Welch's 2,256 votes (38.9%).

In 2012, Ehrhardt narrowly managed to defeat fellow Republican Sharon L. Gamba in the Republican Party primary, winning with just 18 votes. In the general election, Ehrhardt was defeated by Democratic opponent Robert E. Craven Sr., receiving only 3,440 votes (45.7%) to Craven's 4,067 votes (54.0%).

In the 2014 Sharon L. Gamba received the Republican Party nomination for the 32nd House District. In response, Ehrhardt endorsed Craven for his re-election, stating that the newly elected Speaker of the Rhode Island House of Representatives, Nicholas Mattiello, was "leading the House in the right direction", and personally opposed both Gamba and her political mentor, House Minority Leader Brian Newberry.
