= Brian Newberry =

Brian Newberry may refer to:

- Brian Newberry (politician) (born 1971), member of the Rhode Island House of Representatives
- Brian Newberry (American football) (born 1973/74), American football player and coach
