= Jesse Stout =

American activist

Jesse Stout is an American attorney and drug policy reform activist. He practiced business law for the cannabis industry with Greenbridge Corporate Counsel. He was appointed by the San Francisco Board of Supervisors to serve as a member of the San Francisco Cannabis State Legalization Task Force and its successor body the San Francisco Cannabis Oversight Committee. He also recruited employees for cannabis companies, through THC Staffing Group.

Stout was previously the Policy Director at Legal Services for Prisoners with Children from 2013-2015. He was a founder of the Rhode Island Patient Advocacy Coalition (RIPAC) which successfully lobbied the state of Rhode Island for the creation of a medical marijuana program in 2006. In 2009, Stout and RIPAC helped pass the third piece of medical marijuana legislation in Rhode Island calling for the creation of "Compassion Centers" for the distribution of medical cannabis to patients.

In August 2007, Stout was the High Times Freedom Fighter of the Month. In 2010, he was given the Student Activism Award by NORML. In 2016, he received a California Lawyer of the Year award from the Daily Journal.

Stout graduated from Brown University in Providence, RI in 2006, and University of California, Hastings College of the Law in San Francisco, CA in 2012. From 2010 to 2012, he served on the board of directors for Students for Sensible Drug Policy and from 2015-2024, he served on SSDP's Advisory Council. In 2013, he served on the board of directors for the SF Bay Area Chapter of the National Lawyers Guild. From 2015-2021, he joined the board of governors for California Attorneys for Criminal Justice. In 2020, he joined the Board of Directors of Full Picture Justice.
