= Giarrusso =

Giarrusso is an Italian surname.

== List of people with the surname ==
- Antonio Giarrusso (born 1962), American politician
- Chris Giarrusso, American graphic novel author and illustrator
- Dino Giarrusso (born 1974), Italian television personality and politician
- Evan Giarrusso, American musician
- Mario Giarrusso (born 1965), Italian Senator

== See also ==
- Gina Russo
