= Lisa Baldelli-Hunt =

American politician

33rd and 35th Mayor of Woonsocket
- In office December 2013 – November 2023
- Preceded by: Leo T. Fontaine
- Succeeded by: Daniel Gendron (Interim) Herself (Elected)

Member of the Rhode Island House of Representatives from the 49th district
- In office January 2007 – December 2013
- Preceded by: David E. LaRoche
- Succeeded by: Michael Morin

Personal details
- Born: June 13, 1962 (age 64) Rhode Island, U.S.
- Party: Democratic
- Spouse: Edward Hunt
- Children: 3
- Education: Bryant University
- Website: Government website

Lisa Baldelli-Hunt (born June 13, 1962) is an American politician and former Mayor of Woonsocket, Rhode Island.

== Background ==
Baldelli-Hunt lives in Woonsocket, Rhode Island with her husband and family. She went to Bryant College and was involved with the commercial real estate business. Baldelli-Hunt also worked for the United States Postal Service. Baldelli-Hunt is a member of the Democratic Party.

== Family ==
Baldelli-Hunt's nephew is former Minnesota Twins manager Rocco Baldelli. Her uncle is former mayor of Woonsocket, Charles C. Baldelli who served from 1985-1989.

In 2015, Baldelli-Hunt agreed to pay a $750 civil penalty for violating the state ethics code by hiring her son and teammates on his baseball team for unadvertised summer jobs.

== Elections and removal ==
Baldelli-Hunt was elected to the Rhode Island House of Representatives for District 49 in Woonsocket, Rhode Island, in 2006. She served from 2007 to 2013. In 2013, Baldelli-Hunt was elected as mayor of Woonsocket, beating incumbent mayor Leo T. Fontaine. She was the second female mayor in the city's history. Baldelli-Hunt served until October 6, 2022, when she was removed from office by the Woonsocket City Council. Council President Daniel Grendon was immediately sworn in as interim mayor. Baldelli-Hunt ran unopposed in the Woonsocket mayoral elections and again won mayorship on November 9, 2022 for a fifth term with 76% of the vote. Baldelli-Hunt stated that she had plans to revise the charter of the city of Woonsocket to prevent the City Council from removing mayors from office. In July 2026, Baldelli-Hunt announced her run for Woonsocket city council. In October 2026, 15 Woonsocket elected officials published an open letter on the substack of local journalist, Steve Ahlquist, stating they have no confidence in Baldelli-Hunt’s ability to lead Woonsocket.

== Career ==
=== 2010–2017 ===
==== Funeral rights for unmarried couples legislation ====
In 2010, Baldelli-Hunt opposed a Rhode Island bill that allowed same-sex and unmarried couples the right to plan the funerals of their late partners.

==== Sexual Offender Registration And Community Notification Act ====
In 2011, Baldelli-Hunt proposed a law that would allow local police to place signs at the homes of people in the sex offender registry. The bill failed to get out of the committee stage. Baldelli-Hunt told GoLocalProv regarding people in the sex offender registry, "I’m not interested in their rights or protecting them. I have no concern for them because they are the worst of the worst." Baldelli-Hunt proposed the law hoping it would goad registered people into moving out of the state. "It’s not our responsibility to be concerned with how other states handle their sex offenders," Baldelli-Hunt said.

==== Gay marriage legislation ====
In 2013, Baldelli-Hunt voted against a bill allowing same-sex couples to get married in Rhode Island. The Rhode Island House of Representatives approved the measure in a 51-19 vote. Baldelli-Hunt was one of three Woonsocket politicians who opposed the bill, along with Stephen Casey and Robert Phillips.

=== 2018–2020 ===
==== Teacher contract negotiations ====
In August 2018, The Woonsocket Teachers’ Guild declined all contract proposals from Baldelli-Hunt's negotiation team. This prompted a work-to-rule order when the school year began, where teachers only worked during school hours and did not offer after-school activities or tutoring to students. For the next year, teachers followed the order and students were denied access to additional supports. 2018 was the first year in three decades that Woonsocket teachers began the school year without a contract. The Teachers’ Guild claimed Woonsocket teachers were among the lowest paid teachers in Rhode Island. They said in nine years they had only received a 2% raise.

In September 2018 teachers, paraprofessionals, and their supporters engaged in a demonstration staged at Baldelli-Hunt's campaign event. In November 2018, school workers were accused of participating in a sick-out, after 200 educators called out sick, leading to classes being canceled.

In May 2019, a contract was finally approved. The new contract included a "$7.1 million increase in total salaries paid over three years", according to School Committee Chairman Paul Bourget.

==== Reaction to Special One-Time Assistance Program ====
In November 2019, Baldelli-Hunt objected to New York City's Special One-Time Assistance Program, which helped five formerly homeless families relocate back to Rhode Island communities without advanced warning. Baldelli-Hunt cited limited resources as her reasoning for opposing the program, and called on local social service agencies to get involved in blocking the moves.

==== Commentary on Nicholas Alahverdian ====
In March 2020, a statement claiming to be from the family of child welfare reform advocate, Nicholas Alahverdian, stated, "the 32-year-old died after battling non-Hodgkin lymphoma." Baldelli-Hunt honored Alahverdian, telling NBC, "he was just always a fine young man, a gentleman, very dedicated to his cause." In January 2022, the Providence Journal reported Alahverdian was found alive in Scotland, after being hospitalized for COVID-19. It was then revealed that Alahverdian had previously, "been taken into custody and charged in connection to a 2008 sexual assault in Ohio." Alahverdian, whose real name is Rossi, is a convicted sex offender in Ohio and the suspect of multiple sexual assaults in the United States. The US government plans to extradite him to Utah. In reaction to Alahverdian/Rossi being found alive, Baldelli-Hunt stated it would be interesting to hear why he faked his death.

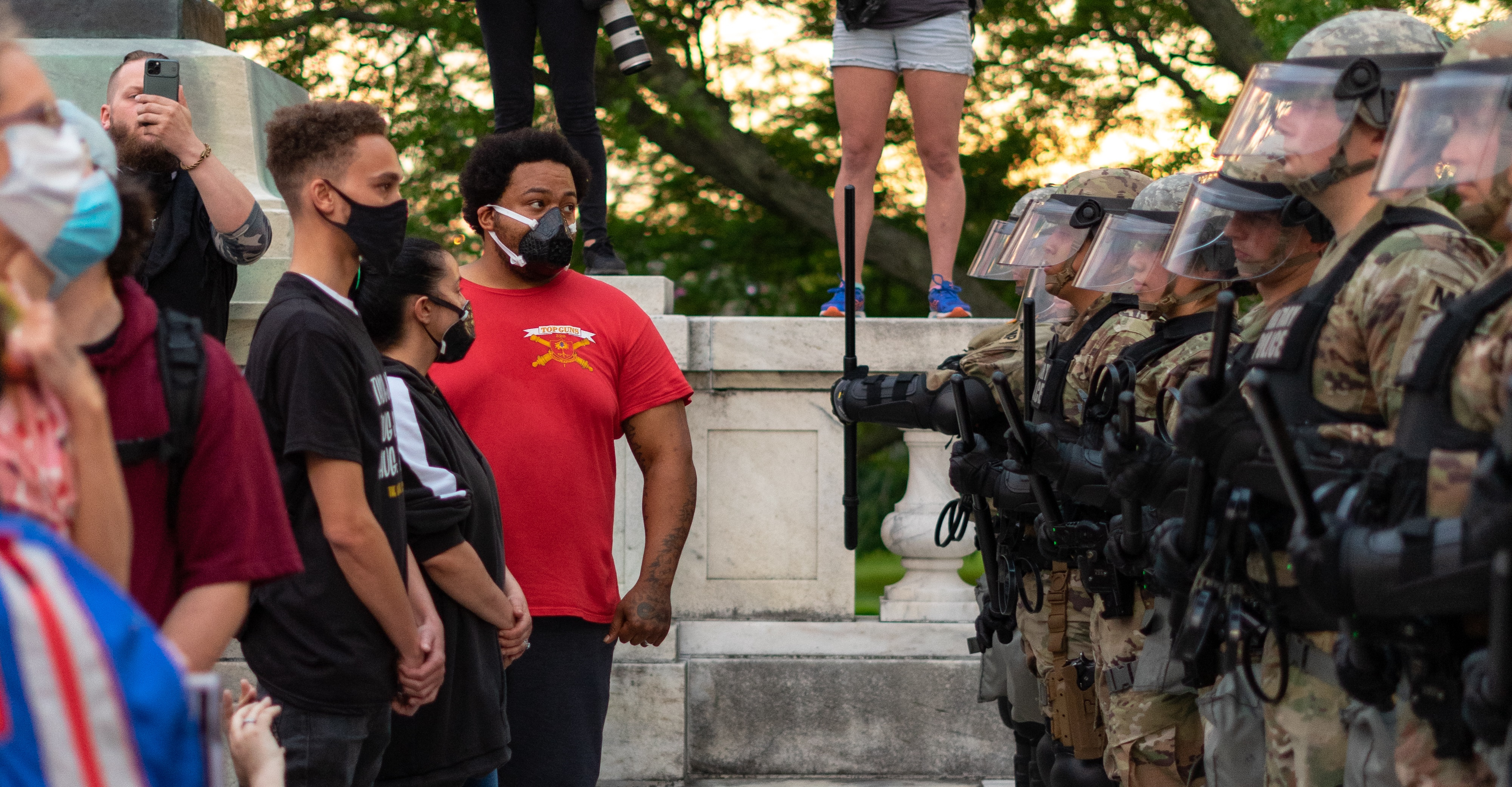
Stand off between Black Lives Matter protesters and the National Guard at the Rhode Island State House.

==== Implementation of curfew ====
In June 2020, Baldelli-Hunt signed an executive order imposing a temporary 8 p.m. city curfew for Woonsocket, following national protests against the murder of George Floyd. Baldelli-Hunt cited a "potential threat against city property" as her reasoning.

=== 2021-2022 ===
==== Dismissal of pride programming ====
In June of 2021, Baldelli-Hunt was accused of intentionally blocking a pride event from taking place in Woonsocket. Organizers said they attempted to book the celebration at River Island Park, paying an application fee for the event. The item never appeared on the city council docket, and was denied because of alleged construction. In response, organizers planned to move their event to Market Square. Baldelli-Hunt then scheduled a car show in the square, giving only three days notice. Black Lives Matter RI PAC criticized the lack of a Pride Flag Raising Ceremony that year, noting that the Woonsocket City Council had voted unanimously in favor of hosting a ceremony. City officials raised an upside down pride flag and neglected to invite the community to be present.

==== Censorship lawsuit ====
In August 2021, the ACLU of Rhode Island filed a federal lawsuit against Baldelli-Hunt for banning and blocking critics from commenting on her Facebook page. In September 2021, both parties reached a settlement. Baldelli-Hunt agreed to unblock previously banned accounts on her Facebook account, to not block anyone going forward "based on First Amendment-protected viewpoints expressed", and pay $7,000 to the ACLU for legal fees.

==== ARPA spending ====
On November 15, 2021, numerous Woonsocket residents attended a City Council meeting to request that the City Council reconsider their plans for funds received under the American Rescue Plan Act (ARPA). Baldelli-Hunt responded to residents defensively. An opinion poll undertaken to gauge resident's opinions on the matter found that residents wanted the money to prioritize housing, infrastructure, including paved roads and clean water, mental health and domestic violence services, and community health and wellness. On November 21, 2021, a rally of at least 40 people gathered to protest Baldelli-Hunt's and the council's proposed budget. Former Woonsocket City Council member, Alex Kithes, stated, "We’re here today because the first $14 million in our city’s ARPA funds were budgeted by the Mayor last week and passed by the City Council for the first time on Monday and they included nothing that our neighbors [wanted], nothing for housing and health." Participants noted the presence of workers from the Woonsocket Highway Department using leaf blowers and idling trucks in the park until the rally ended.

==== Resolution opposing harm reduction centers ====
In 2022, after Rhode Island became the first state to legalize supervised injection sites, Baldelli-Hunt passed a resolution opposing harm reduction centers. According to the Valley Breeze newspaper, the leaders wrote that they "do not support or condone the consumption or use of illicit drugs" and would not place a harm reduction center in the city of Woonsocket. In 2021, Woonsocket firefighters responded to 163 calls for suspected overdoses and recorded 11 overdose deaths.

=== 2023–present ===
==== Demolition of homeless encampment ====
On January 4, 2023, Baldelli-Hunt ordered the demolition of a Woonsocket homeless encampment where nine people were sheltering by the Blackstone River. After police gave a 30-minute notice to the encampment residents, the Department of Public Works bulldozed the tents, and disposed of all belongings from the encampment into a dumpster. One resident, who had lived in a tent at the encampment for years, lost drawings from his children because of the demolition. Michelle Taylor, vice president at CCA, said police claimed there would be a bus that would take campers to an emergency shelter in Providence following eviction, yet a bus never arrived. Woonsocket service providers stated that the city never coordinated with them around supporting clients displaced from the demolition.

State Senator Melissa Murray criticized Baldelli-Hunt's administration for clearing the camps in an opinion letter on behalf of herself and colleagues in the General Assembly, Representatives Jon Brien, Robert Phillips, and Steve Casey, writing, "Bulldozing camps and destroying a person’s only respite from the elements is cruel and does not solve the problem of homelessness." The politicians accused Baldelli-Hunt of pawning off homeless people on other municipalities. Former encampment residents were told by employees of the city to leave Woonsocket and go to Providence or Cranston. Woonsocket has the second highest number of people experiencing homelessness in the state.

==== Issuance of cease and desist order to methadone clinic ====
In mid-January 2023, Baldelli-Hunt's administration issued a cease and desist order to CODAC Behavioral Healthcare's mobile methadone clinic demanding they move from the parking lot of the Community Care Alliance in Woonsocket. The clinic provides treatment for opioid use disorder to 40 patients a day. In 2021, Woonsocket had the highest number of overdoses in the state of any municipality.

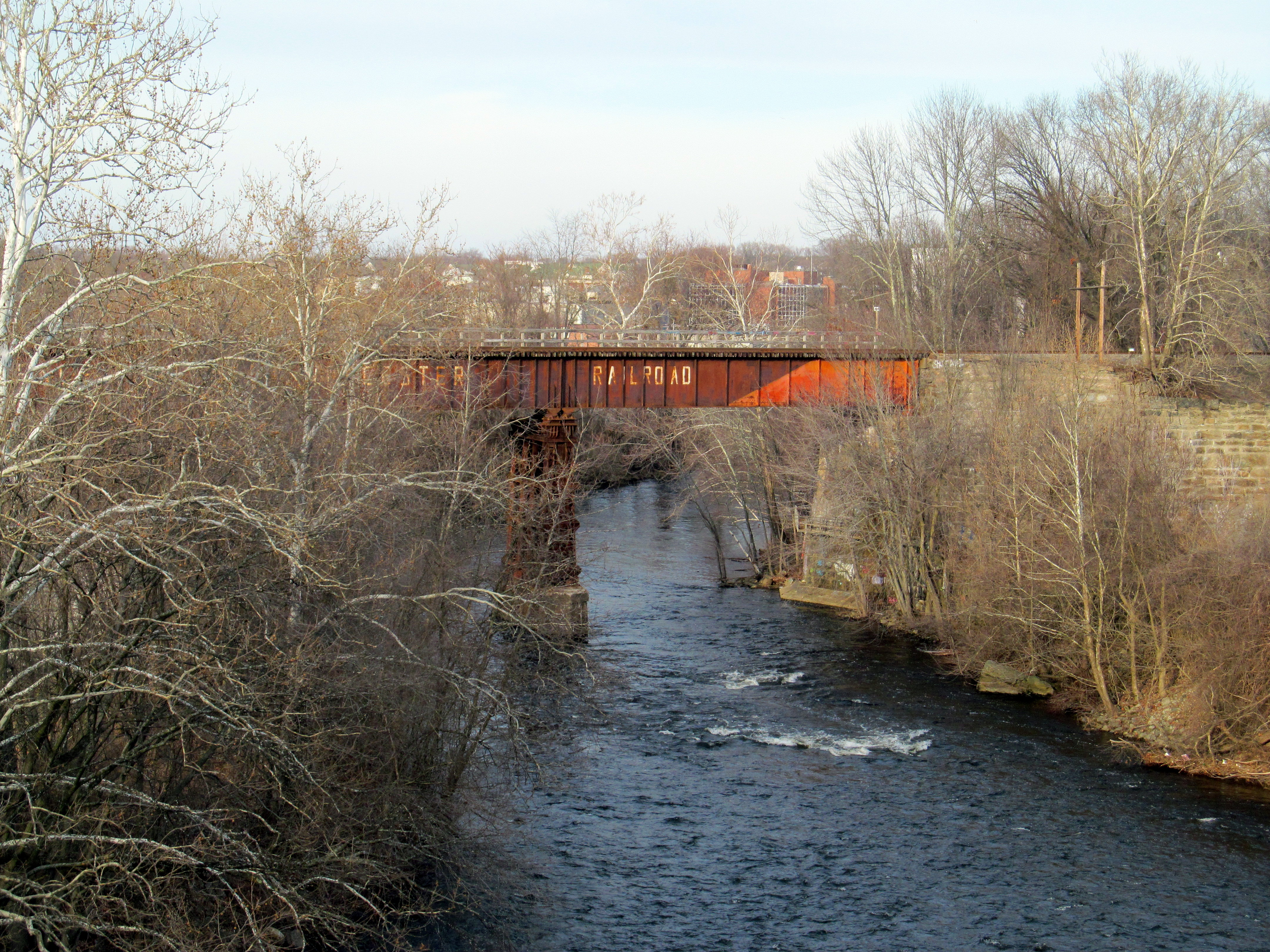
Providence & Worcester Railroad bridge over the Blackstone River in Woonsocket, Rhode Island in February 2016.

==== Blackstone River lawsuit ====
In March 2023, Rhode Island Attorney General Peter Neronha announced he was suing the city of Woonsocket and its contractors for dumping effluent in the Blackstone River. The lawsuit alleges the city polluted the river multiple times and, in doing so, violated state environmental laws and Rhode Island's Clean Water Act. Baldelli-Hunt claims that other municipalities dump sewage in the Blackstone and Woonsocket is only responsible for 10% of it.

==== Purchase of 181 Cumberland ====
In 2017, social services organization, Community Care Alliance, reported water damage from a leak in their 181 Cumberland location to the state of Rhode Island. The damage was ignored by the R.I. Department of Administration for three years, which led to the development of black mold.

In 2019, CCA hired and paid a "contractor to conduct an analysis of the air quality twice". CCA was forced to abandon the building in 2020, after it had rented the space for $1 a year since 1981, and had to spend $20,000 to move out of the building.

Despite the damages and move, the basement of the building was still able to function "as a working kitchen, preparing approximately 2,500 meals weekly for individuals served in psychiatric residences, substance-use residential facilities, individuals receiving shelter and a few hundred youth that participate in the Boys and Girls Club locally."

In July 2022, CCA's CEO, Ben Lessing, advocated for the building's repair and reopening as a social services center. In February 2023, 181 Cumberland was put up for auction by the state. In May 2023, the city of Woonsocket announced it would be purchasing the building using ARPA funds, despite city counselor, Garrett Mancieri, claiming, "Community Care Alliance was still in the building and “very much operating" in the building".

==== U.S. Department of Housing and Urban Development lawsuit ====
In June 2023, the U.S. Department of Housing and Urban Development (HUD) announced its lawsuit against the city of Woonsocket over the illegal sale of "a residential property belonging to HUD -- on a city tax sale." The property was sold, under the Baldelli-Hunt administration, to two bankers known to give political contributions to Rhode Island candidates. The bankers, Nathaniel and H. Jeffrey Baker, flipped the property and sold it at a 1,800% increase.

==== Resignation ====
On November 10, 2023, Baldelli-Hunt resigned the office of Mayor of the City of Woonsocket, citing health concerns dating back to her prior fainting episode in April 2023.
