= Jenni Furtado =

Member of the Rhode Island House of Representatives

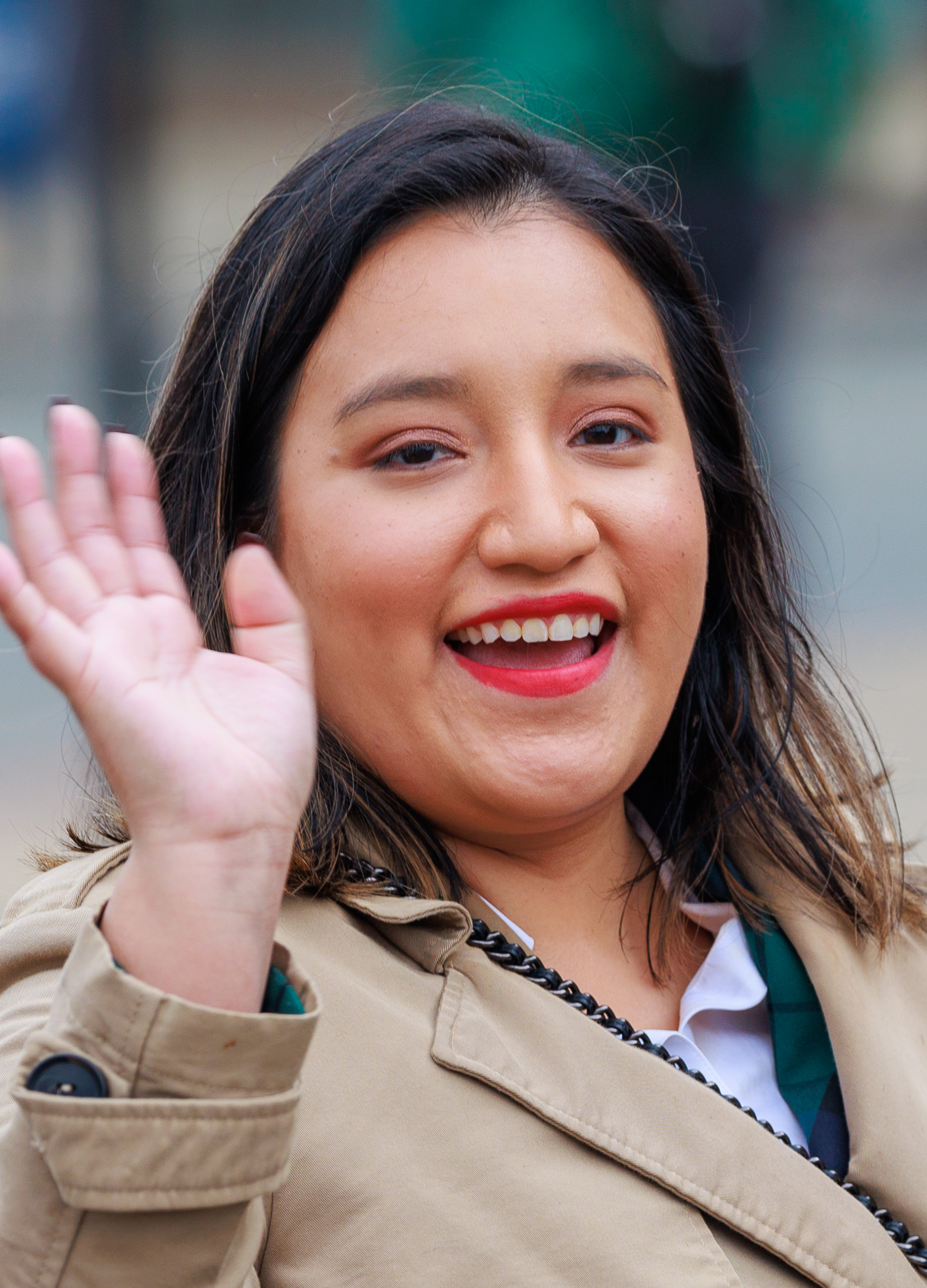
- Furtado in 2025

Member of the Rhode Island House of Representatives from the 64th district
- Incumbent
- Assumed office January 7, 2025
- Preceded by: Brianna Henries

Personal details
- Born: c. 1993
- Party: Democratic
- Spouse: Marc Furtado
- Education: St. John’s University, Roger Williams University Law School
- Profession: Politician
- Website: jennifurtado.com

Jenni A. Furtado (born c. 1993) is an American politician and a Democratic member of the Rhode Island House of Representatives representing District 64 since January 7, 2025.

== Early life and education ==
Jenni Furtado (née Azanero) was born in New York to first-generation Peruvian immigrants. She graduated from St. John's University in 2015 and earned her Juris Doctor degree from Roger Williams University School of Law in 2019, with a specialty in immigration and worker's compensation law.

== Career ==
Furtado served four years on the East Providence School Committee, where she oversaw the completion of a new East Providence High School. When District 64 Democratic state representative Brianna Henries announced that she would not seek re-election in 2024, Furtado entered the race. She defeated her Democratic Primary opponent, Ashley Pereira, winning 72.5% of the vote on September 10, 2024. She was sworn in on January 7, 2025.

Preceded by Brianna Henries	Representative, Rhode Island House of Representatives; District 64; 2025 - Present	Succeeded by Incumbent
