= Antonio Giarrusso =

Member of the Rhode Island House of Representatives

Member of the Rhode Island House of Representatives from the 30th district
- In office January 1, 2013 – January 1, 2019
- Preceded by: Robert A. Watson
- Succeeded by: Justine Caldwell

Personal details
- Born: February 5, 1962 (age 64)
- Party: Republican
- Education: Bryant College; Community College of Rhode Island

Antonio Giarrusso (born February 5, 1962) is an American politician and was a Republican member of the Rhode Island House of Representatives representing District 30 from 2013 to 2018.

== Education ==
Giarrusso attended Bryant College (now Bryant University) and earned his associate degree from the Community College of Rhode Island.

== Elections ==
- 2012 When District 30 Democratic Representative Robert A. Watson retired and left the seat open, Giarrusso ran in the three-way September 11, 2012 Republican Primary, winning with 354 votes (46.2%) and won the three-way November 6, 2012 General election by 72 with 3,315 votes (44.4%) against Democratic nominee Mark Schwager and Independent candidate Kevin McDonough. On November 6, 2018, Giarrusso was defeated in his re-election bid by Democratic candidate Justine Caldwell, by a margin of 51.1%(3686 votes) to 48.8%(3517 votes).
