= 2024 United States Senate election in Rhode Island =

- November 5, 2024
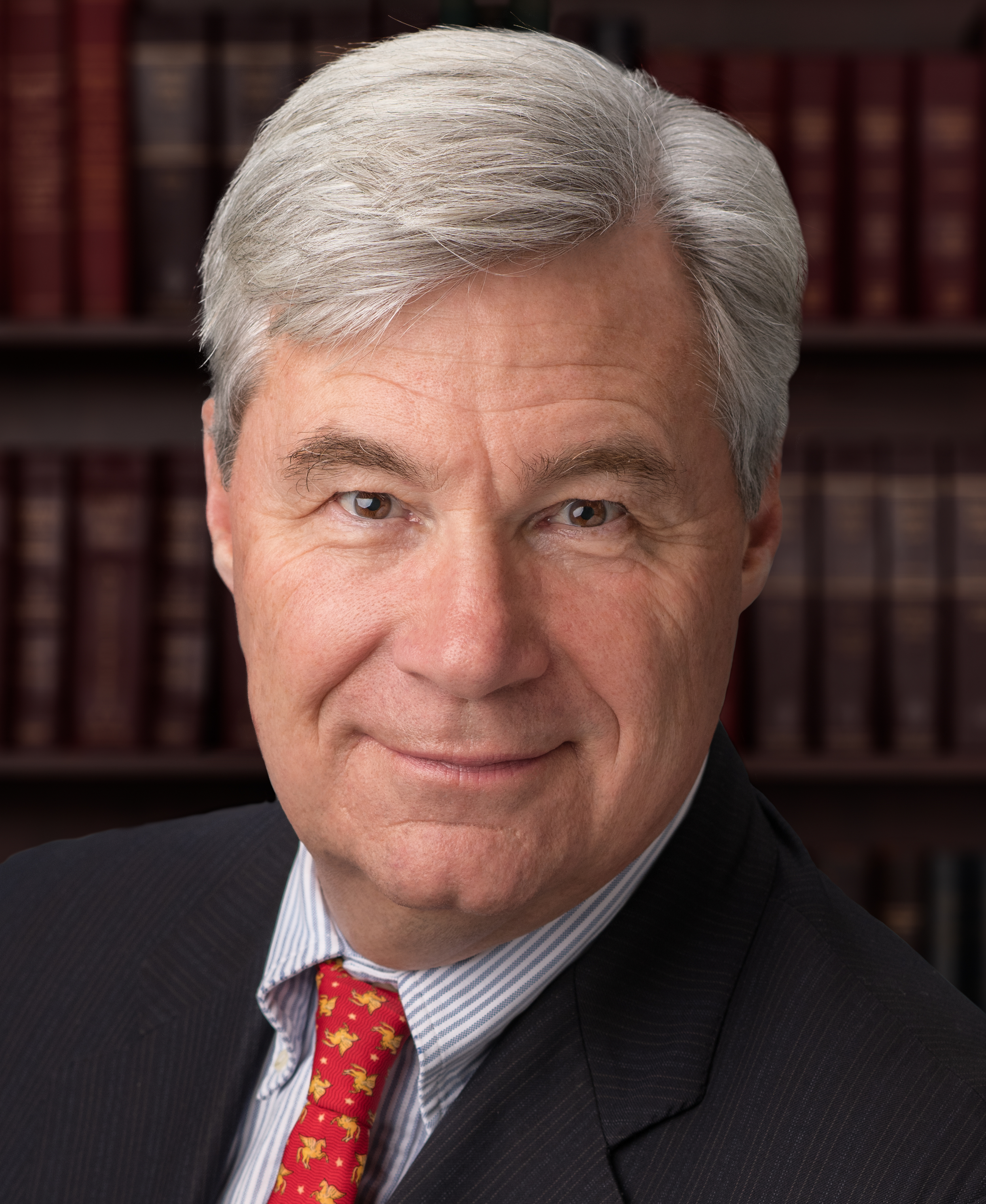

Nominee	Sheldon Whitehouse	Patricia Morgan
Party	Democratic	Republican
Popular vote	294,665	196,039
Percentage	59.90%	39.85%
- Whitehouse: 50–60% 60–70% 70–80% 80–90% >90% Morgan: 40–50% 50–60% 60–70% Tie: 40–50% No votes
U.S. senator before election
Sheldon Whitehouse
Democratic
Elected U.S. Senator
Sheldon Whitehouse
Democratic

The 2024 United States Senate election in Rhode Island was held on November 5, 2024, to elect a member of the United States Senate to represent the state of Rhode Island. The primary election took place on September 10, 2024.

Incumbent Democratic Senator Sheldon Whitehouse was re-elected to a fourth term in office, defeating Republican state representative Patricia Morgan by a 20.05% margin. Whitehouse swept all five of the state's counties for the third consecutive time in his Senate career, and he overperformed Kamala Harris in the concurrent presidential election by around 4.4 percentage points. Even so, his 20.05% margin marked a decline from his previous margins in 2012 and 2018, and this race was the closest in his senatorial career since his first election in 2006.

== Democratic primary ==
=== Candidates ===
==== Nominee ====
- Sheldon Whitehouse, incumbent U.S. senator

==== Eliminated in primary ====
- Michael Costa, investment manager

==== Withdrew ====
- Allen Waters, investment consultant, Republican nominee for U.S. Senate in 2020 and for Rhode Island's 1st congressional district in 2022 (ran for U.S. House)

==== Declined ====
- Gina Raimondo, Secretary of Commerce (2021–2025) and Governor of Rhode Island (2015–2021)

=== Endorsements ===
Sheldon Whitehouse

U.S representatives

- Gabby Giffords, U.S. representative from Arizona's 8th congressional district (2007–2012)

Organizations

- American Israel Public Affairs Committee (AIPAC)
- Council for a Livable World
- End Citizens United
- Feminist Majority PAC
- Giffords
- Humane Society Legislative Fund
- Joint Action Committee for Political Affairs
- J Street PAC
- League of Conservation Voters
- Natural Resources Defense Council
- Planned Parenthood Action Fund
- Population Connection Action Fund

=== Fundraising ===
Campaign finance reports as of June 30, 2024
Candidate	Raised	Spent	Cash on hand
Sheldon Whitehouse (D)	$5,889,595	$2,934,027	$3,724,328
Source: Federal Election Commission

=== Results ===
Results by municipality: Whitehouse—90–100% Whitehouse—80–90% Whitehouse—70–80% Whitehouse—60–70%

Democratic primary results
Party	Candidate	Votes	%
Democratic	Sheldon Whitehouse (incumbent)	49,401	83.77%
Democratic	Michael Costa	9,572	16.23%
Total votes		58,973	100.0%

== Republican primary ==
=== Candidates ===
==== Nominee ====
- Patricia Morgan, state representative, former Minority Leader of the Rhode Island House of Representatives, and candidate for governor in 2018

==== Eliminated in primary ====
- Raymond McKay, IT professional, former member of the Rhode Island Republican Party State Central Committee, and former president of the Rhode Island Republican Assembly

=== Fundraising ===
Campaign finance reports as of June 30, 2024
Candidate	Raised	Spent	Cash on hand
Raymond McKay (R)	$116,907 (Note: $940 of this total was self-funded by McKay)	$100,787	$16,120
Patricia Morgan (R)	$202,538 (Note: $22,500 of this total was self-funded by Morgan)	$65,443	$137,095
Source: Federal Election Commission

=== Results ===
Results by municipality: Morgan—70–80% Morgan—60–70% Morgan—50–60% McKay—50–60%

Republican primary results
Party	Candidate	Votes	%
Republican	Patricia Morgan	12,108	64.44%
Republican	Raymond McKay	6,681	35.56%
Total votes		18,789	100.0%

== General election ==
=== Predictions ===
Source	Ranking	As of
The Cook Political Report	Solid D	November 9, 2023
Elections Daily	Safe D	May 4, 2023
Inside Elections	Solid D	November 9, 2023
Decision Desk HQ/The Hill	Safe D	June 8, 2024
Sabato's Crystal Ball	Safe D	November 9, 2023
CNalysis	Solid D	November 21, 2023
RealClearPolitics	Solid D	August 5, 2024
Split Ticket	Safe D	October 23, 2024
538	Solid D	October 23, 2024

=== Polling ===
Poll source	Date(s) administered	Sample size (Note: Key: A – all adults RV – registered voters LV – likely voters V – unclear)	Margin of error	Sheldon Whitehouse (D)	Patricia Morgan (R)	Other	Undecided
University of New Hampshire	October 29 – November 2, 2024	708 (LV)	± 3.7%	54%	40%	1% (Note: "Another candidate" with 1%)	6%
Embold Research (Note: Poll sponsored by the Salve Regina University Pell Center for International Relations and Public Policy)	September 16–20, 2024	876 (LV)	± 3.5%	52%	36%	2% (Note: "Would not vote" with 2%)	11%
MassINC Polling Group (Note: Poll sponsored by the Rhode Island Current)	September 12–18, 2024	800 (LV)	± 3.9%	52%	37%	–	11%
University of New Hampshire	September 12–16, 2024	683 (LV)	± 3.7%	51%	33%	6% (Note: "Another candidate" with 6%)	11%
University of Rhode Island	August 15 - September 8, 2024	500 (A)	± 6.02%	52%	24%	7% (Note: "Would not vote" with 4%)	17%

Hypothetical polling

Sheldon Whitehouse vs. Generic Republican

Poll source	Date(s) administered	Sample size	Margin of error	Sheldon Whitehouse (D)	Generic Republican	Other	Undecided
Embold Research	June 5–14, 2024	1,405 (LV)	± 2.8%	48%	34%	–	17%

=== Results ===

2024 United States Senate election in Rhode Island
Party	Candidate	Votes	%	±%
Democratic	Sheldon Whitehouse (incumbent)	294,665	59.90%	−1.54%
Republican	Patricia Morgan	196,039	39.85%	+1.52%
Write-in		1,244	0.25%	+0.03%
Total votes		491,948	100.00%	N/A
Democratic hold				

==== By county ====
	Sheldon Whitehouse Democratic		Patricia Morgan Republican		Others	
County	Votes	%	Votes	%	Votes	%
Bristol	17,552	63.8%	9,888	36.0%	49	0.2%
Kent	49,019	54.1%	41,403	45.7%	207	0.2%
Newport	27,289	63.2%	15,830	36.7%	64	0.1%
Providence	156,457	61.3%	98,145	38.4%	793	0.3%
Washington	42,992	58.3%	30,661	41.6%	126	0.2%

==== By congressional district ====
Whitehouse won both congressional districts.

District	Whitehouse	Morgan	Representative
1st	64%	36%	Gabe Amo
2nd	56%	43%	Seth Magaziner

== Notes ==
Partisan clients
