= Arlette Hidalgo =

Dominican-born American politician

Member-elect of the Rhode Island House of Representatives from the 12th district
- Assuming office January 2027
- Succeeding: Jose Batista

Personal details
- Born: Dominican Republic
- Party: Democratic

Arlette Hidalgo is a Dominican-born American politician. A member of the Democratic Party, she is the member-elect for the 12th district of the Rhode Island House of Representatives.
