= John Carnevale =

American politician

Member of the Rhode Island House of Representatives from the 13th district
- In office January 2009 – January 1, 2017
- Preceded by: Steven Smith
- Succeeded by: Ramon Perez

Personal details
- Born: September 3, 1961 (age 65)
- Party: Democratic
- Education: Roger Williams University

John M. Carnevale (born September 3, 1961) is an American politician and a Democratic member of the Rhode Island House of Representatives representing District 13 from January 2009 to January 2017.

== Education ==
Carnevale earned his BS from Roger Williams University.

== Career ==
Carnevale was a Providence Police sergeant until March 2007, when, at age 45, he began his retirement on a $45,649 disability pension. In 2008 he began his legislative career, running unopposed to be representative of District 13, which spans Providence and Johnston.

Carnevale's late brother was Anthony Carnevale, a former Rhode Island magistrate who also served as a state representative from Providence and Johnston for 12 years starting in 1976, and for whom an elementary school in Providence is named after. Anthony Carnevale Elementary School is located in District 13, and also serves as a local polling place for the district.

Carnevale's was removed from the primary ballot in 2016 after a WPRI television report led to the Providence Board of Canvassers ruling that he did not live in his district, and was thus ineligible to be a candidate.

During his time in office, Carnevale was vice chairman of the Rhode Island House Finance Committee.

== Personal life ==
=== Sexual assault indictments ===
In October 2011, Carnevale was indicted by a grand jury on charges of first- and second-degree sexual assault, as well as one count of assault with the intent to commit sexual assault. His alleged victim claimed Carnevale arrived at her house intoxicated, pulled her down on a mattress and attempted to rape her, resulting in a struggle, and that when she resisted, Carnevale masturbated in front of her and forced her face up to his genitalia. She also alleged that after he finished, Carnevale threw a $20 bill down and told her to "take her kid out to eat." DNA evidence collected from the victim's pajamas matched a sample provided by Carnevale, according to the Johnston Police Department. Carnevale pled not guilty to the charges, and refused calls to resign.

On January 1, 2012, his accuser, a 46-year-old mother of two and ex-wife of another Providence police officer, died of a pulmonary embolism, according to an autopsy by the state medical examiner. The charges were later dropped by attorney general Peter Kilmartin, citing an inability to proceed without the woman's testimony.

=== Domestic abuse allegations ===
Carnevale's ex-wife has sought restraining orders against him several times with allegations of physical abuse, according to court records from 1998, 1999 and 2004. In the affidavits she alleged that Carnevale, divorced since 2000, had been arrested three times by North Kingstown, RI police, and that he had choked and punched her, struck her with a cord, pinned her against a wall, slapped her, and dragged her by the wrist out of her house in separate incidents.

=== Felony perjury indictments ===
On January 13, 2017, a state grand jury handed up an indictment and prosecutors charged him with three felony counts of perjury before the Board of Canvassers, related to his statements concerning his legal residence. He was also charged with a misdemeanor for filing false documents to unlawfully receive owner-occupied property tax breaks.

Despite the ongoing criminal case, in late June 2018, Carnevale filed papers to run again for state representative in his old district. Days later, he was endorsed by the leadership of the House District 13 Representative District Committee, over the current incumbent, Rep. Ramon Perez, for the Democratic primary.

== Elections ==
- 2008: When District 13 Democratic Representative Steven Smith retired and left the seat open, Carnevale ran unopposed in both the Democratic primary on September 9, 2008, winning with 375 votes, and the general election on November 4, 2008, winning with 3,283 votes.
- 2010: Carnevale was unopposed in the Democratic primary on September 23, 2010, winning with 1,339 votes, and won the general election on November 2, 2010, with 2,288 votes (79.6%) against Republican nominee Damien Baldino.
- 2012: Carnevale was unopposed in both the Democratic primary on September 11, 2012, winning with 550 votes, and the general election on November 6, 2012, winning with 2,901 votes.
- 2014: Carnevale was unopposed in both the Democratic primary on September 9, 2014, winning with 1120 votes, and the general election on November 4, 2014, winning with 2,277 votes.
- 2016: Carnevale was removed from the primary ballot after a controversy arose regarding his residency in his district.
- 2018: Carnevale files to run for his old seat in District 13, claiming to have lived in the district for just three months in his filing, despite being a defendant in an ongoing criminal case for three felony perjury charges and another charge for filing false documents.

== Eligibility Controversy ==
On June 13, 2016, WPRI reporters Tim White and Ted Nesi published a report of an undercover probe that surveilled Carnevale for months, finding he was frequently seen at a house in Johnston that he bought in 2007, but neither he nor his vehicles were ever seen at the house in Providence where he was registered to vote. The report accused Carnevale of either not living in the district he represents, or misleading the Rhode Island Ethics Commission by failing to disclose the second residence in his financial statements.

WPRI interviewed former tenants of Carnevale's claimed address in Providence who said Carnevale did not live at the house, and that they were instructed to say he lived at the property, if anyone asked. "He was just some guy who was our landlord," one said.

The report also described a mortgage document for the house in Johnston, outside his district, which stated Carnevale "agrees to occupy the property as [his] principal residence within sixty days", signed in 2007. Carnevale declared candidacy the next year in Providence, claiming he had been a resident there his entire life.

The report featured video footage of Carnevale leaving the house and noticing the TV news crew outside his house in Johnston, disappearing, and then returning with his face wrapped in a T-shirt before getting in his car and driving off.

The day the WPRI story was broadcast, Carnevale filed corrections to nine years of financial disclosures he had made to the Rhode Island Ethics Commission since he took office, adding the home in Johnston and two additional lots as additional property he owns that he said were not his primary residence. He also sent a letter to his constituents defending himself, claiming he wrapped a towel around his face to filter dust and pollen from the air, due to severe allergies.

On June 21, 2016, the Providence Board of Canvassers voted to investigate a complaint about Carnevale's residency and hold a hearing, expected in mid-July.

On July 28, 2016, the Providence Board of Canvassers ruled that Carnevale was not eligible to vote at the home on Barbara Street where he claimed to live, and thus was ineligible to run for office in the 13th District. A Providence police lieutenant testified that Carnevale asked him to ticket his car in the days leading up to his Board of Canvassers hearing, and that he found the request “extremely odd,” and assumed “that he was trying to use that violation as some form of validating that he resided at that residence.” The lieutenant notified his superior, who in turn notified Providence police Commissioner Paré.
