= Thomas C. Slater =

American politician (1945–2009)

Member of the Rhode Island House of Representatives from the 17th (pre-2003), 10th (after 2003) district
- In office January 3, 1995 – August 10, 2009
- Preceded by: Mary C. Ross (R-17)
- Succeeded by: Scott A. Slater (D-10)

Personal details
- Born: May 21, 1945 Providence, Rhode Island, US
- Died: August 10, 2009 (aged 64) Providence, Rhode Island, US
- Party: Democratic
- Spouse: Jody D. McKiernan Slater
- Children: Gary M. Slater; Scott A. Slater; Ellen J. Slater Gopalakrishnan
- Education: Johnson and Wales University

Thomas C. Slater (1945–2009) was a Democratic member of the Rhode Island House of Representatives. He served in the U.S. Marine Corps Reserve for 30 years, reaching the rank of Sergeant Major. He ran for office in 1994 and defeated incumbent Republican Representative Mary C. Ross for Providence Representative in the state house, and continue serving until his death in 2009. He was a member of the House Finance Committee, and he spoke against cuts to welfare benefits and children's health care, opposed an executive order cracking down on undocumented immigrants living in the state, and supported new fire codes. Medical marijuana access was a large focus for Slater and one of the final pieces of legislation that he sponsored involved the 2009 legalization of medicinal marijuana dispensaries in Rhode Island.

== Early life and military career ==
Thomas C. Slater was born in Providence, Rhode Island May 21, 1945, to Thomas J. and Edith M. (Simpson) Slater. He had six siblings, among them three sisters: Patricia, Frances, and Deborah, and a brother Stephen. He grew up in Providence, attended La Salle Academy, was a graduate of Johnson & Wales University, and he served in the U.S. Marine Corps Reserve, retiring after 30 years with the rank of Sergeant Major.

== Political career ==
=== First campaigns and legislation ===
Slater ran for office on November 8, 1994, defeating incumbent Republican Representative Mary C. Ross by a margin of 55%-45% of the votes cast. Slater served in the Rhode Island House of Representatives from January 3, 1995, until his death in 2009. While a Providence representative, he was a member of the House Finance Committee. Among other issues, he spoke against budget cuts that would have limited welfare benefits to the poor of Rhode Island, and which would have also reduced health care for children. He also opposed an executive order signed by Governor Don Carcieri, which cracked down on illegal immigrants living in Rhode Island. He advocated for the State of Rhode Island Rehabilitation Building and Fire Code for Existing Buildings and Structures in January 2002, which was adopted in May 2002 and provided a uniform fire code and building code. In 2003 he supported a bill for a hike in the state minimum wage, to increase the rate from US$6.15 to a mandatory $6.57 an hour.

=== Medical marijuana legislation ===
He was supporting legislation to legalize medical marijuana in Rhode Island by 2005, and in 2006 he sponsored legislation that made Rhode Island the 11th US state to allow chronically ill patients to use small amounts of marijuana to ease symptoms. The year prior, he cast the role vote against an amendment to name the medicinal marijuana law after him. The Edward O. Hawkins and Thomas C. Slater Medical Marijuana Act passed in 2006, but did not clarify legal methods for patients to procure their medicine, leaving them dependent on the black market. Slater urged lawmakers in 2009 to allow up to three nonprofit marijuana stores to sell to registered patients, with the legislation passing by a wide margin and earning Slater a standing ovation when the bill passed in the House.

== Memberships ==
He was a Past Grand Knight and fourth degree member of the Cranston Knights of Columbus, a Catholic fraternal service organization. He was also a longtime member of the Providence Democratic City Committee.

== Personal life and legacy ==
Slater and his wife Jody McKierman had three children: Ellen, Gary, and Scott. He died on August 10, 2009, from lung cancer at his home in Providence. He was buried at the Rhode Island Veterans Cemetery in Exeter, Rhode Island.

When Slater died later in 2009, his son Scott Slater succeeded him in his position as a Providence representative. The Thomas C. Slater Compassion Center is a medicinal dispensary in Rhode Island named after Slater, and was the first dispensary in the state, opened in spring of 2013. The Thomas C. Slater Training School for delinquent youth in Providence is also named for him. Eight years after Slater helped push the bill through, on March 28, 2017, the "Legislative Oversight Commission of the Edward O. Hawkins and Thomas C. Slater Medical Marijuana Act" met for the first time, with his son Scott Slater included as the representative of the House.

== See also ==
- Rhode Island General Assembly
