= J. Patrick O'Neill =

American politician (born 1971)

Paddy O'Neill

Member of the Rhode Island House of Representatives from the 59th district
- In office January 4, 2005 – January 6, 2015
- Succeeded by: Jean Philippe Barros

Personal details
- Born: January 14, 1971 (age 55) Newport, Rhode Island
- Party: Democratic
- Spouse: Sheri Durigan
- Education: Providence College; Colby College; Roger Williams University School of Law
- Profession: Attorney

J. Patrick O'Neill (born January 14, 1971) is an American attorney and former Democratic member of the Rhode Island House of Representatives, who represented the 59th District from 2005 to 2015. He served on the House Committees on Judiciary, and Rules. On February 11, 2010, he was elected as Majority Whip of the House of Representatives In June 2023, he was sworn in as an Associate Judge of the Providence District Court by Governor Dan McKee.
