= William San Bento =

American politician

Member of the Rhode Island House of Representatives from the 58th district
- In office January 2003 – January 2015
- Preceded by: Rene Menard
- Succeeded by: Carlos E. Tobon

Member of the Rhode Island House of Representatives from the 75th district
- In office January 1993 – January 2003
- Preceded by: Harvey Goulet
- Succeeded by: Paul Crowley

Personal details
- Born: December 11, 1946 Pawtucket, Rhode Island
- Died: September 12, 2016 (aged 69) Pawtucket, Rhode Island
- Party: Democratic
- Profession: Insurance

William San Bento Jr. (December 11, 1946 – September 12, 2016) was an American businessman and politician.

Born in Pawtucket, Rhode Island, San Bento owned an insurance business. San Bento served in the Rhode Island House of Representatives and was a member of the Democratic Party. He represented District 75 from January 1993 until January 2003, and District 58 from January 2003 to January 2015.

== Elections ==
- 1992 When District 75 Democratic Representative Harvey Goulet left the Legislature and left the seat open, San Bento won the September 15, 1992 Democratic Primary and was unopposed for the November 3, 1992 General election with 1,801 votes.
- 1994 San Bento was unopposed for both the September 13, 1994 Democratic Primary and the November 8, 1994 General election, winning with 1,238 votes.
- 1996 San Bento was unopposed for both the September 10, 1996 Democratic Primary and the November 5, 1996 General election.
- 1998 San Bento was unopposed for both the September 15, 1998 Democratic Primary, winning with 257 votes and the November 3, 1998 General election, winning with 1,251 votes.
- 2000 San Bento was unopposed for both the September 12, 2000 Democratic Primary, winning with 323 votes and the November 7, 2000 General election, winning with 1,626 votes.
- 2002 Redistricted to District 58, and with incumbent Representative Rene Menard redistricted to District 45, San Bento was unopposed for both the September 10, 2002 Democratic Primary, winning with 705 votes and the November 5, 2002 General election, winning with 1,874 votes.
- 2004 San Bento was challenged in the September 14, 2004 Democratic Primary, winning with 525 votes (73.7%) and was unopposed for the November 2, 2004 General election, winning with 2,602 votes.
- 2006 San Bento was unopposed for both the September 12, 2006 Democratic Primary, winning with 585 votes and the November 7, 2006 General election, winning with 2,399 votes.
- 2008 San Bento was unopposed for both the September 9, 2008 Democratic Primary, winning with 347 votes and the November 4, 2008 General election, winning with 2,877 votes.
- 2010 San Bento was challenged in the three-way September 23, 2010 Democratic Primary, winning with 568 votes (43.4%) and won the November 2, 2010 General election with 1,668 votes (72.9%) against Republican nominee Michael Grossi.
- 2012 San Bento was challenged in the September 11, 2012 Democratic Primary, winning by 1 vote with 544 votes (50.0%) and was unopposed for the November 6, 2012 General election, winning with 3,275 votes.
