= Scott A. Slater =

American politician

Scott Slater
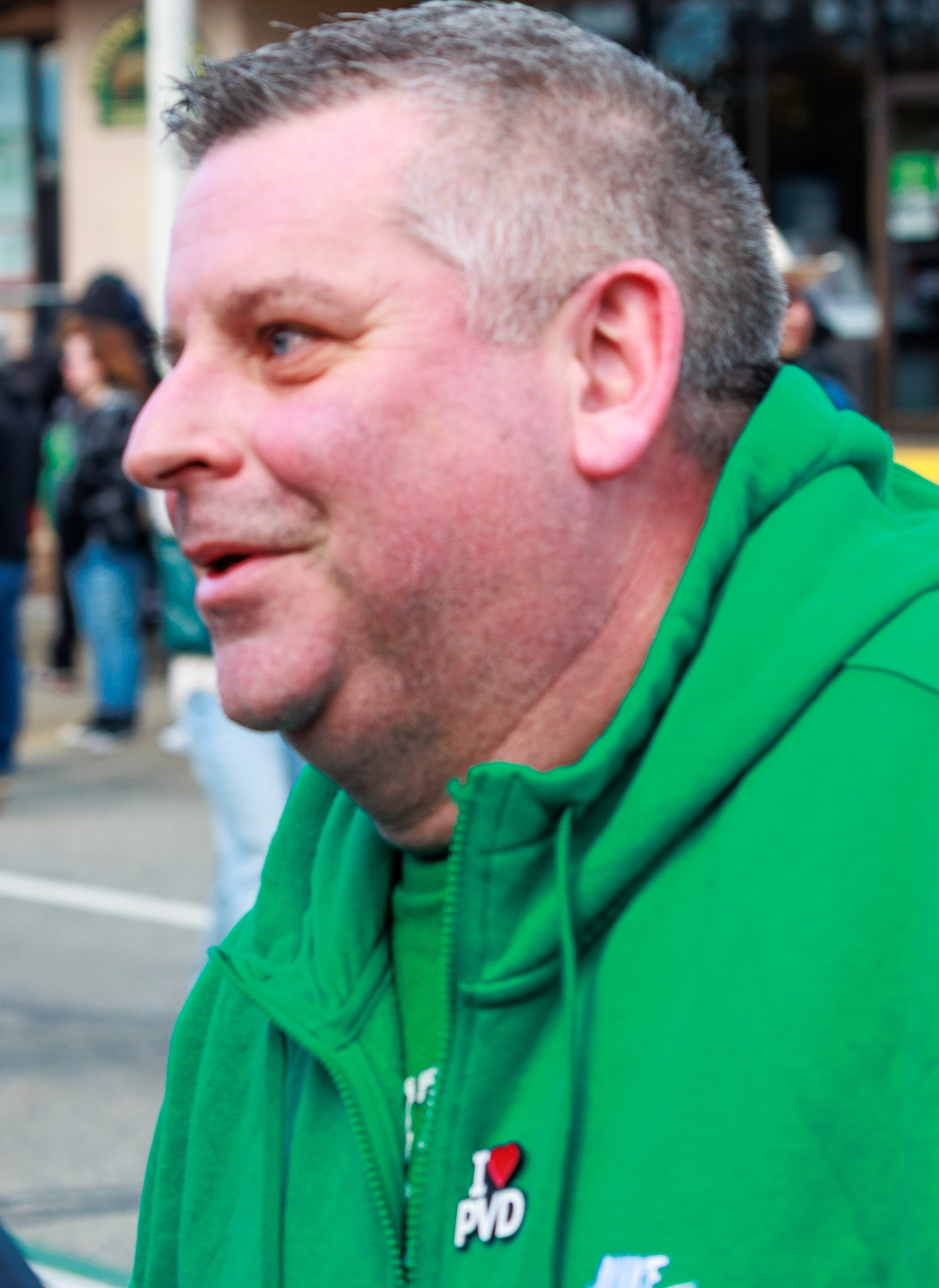

Member of the Rhode Island House of Representatives from the 10th district
- Incumbent
- Assumed office November 2009
- Preceded by: Thomas C. Slater

Personal details
- Born: May 28, 1975 (age 51)
- Party: Democratic
- Education: Bryant University (BS)

Scott A. Slater (born May 28, 1975) is an American politician. He has been a Democratic member of the Rhode Island House of Representatives representing District 10 since 2009.

He is on the Legislative Oversight Commission of the Edward O. Hawkins and Thomas C. Slater Medical Marijuana Act, which first met in 2017.

== Early life and education ==
Scott A. Slater was born May 28, 1975 to Thomas C. Slater and Jody McKierman of Providence, Rhode Island, he had two siblings: Ellen and Gary Slater earned his BS degree from Bryant University.

== Career ==
=== First campaigns ===
He became a Democratic member of the Rhode Island House of Representatives representing District 10 since the November 2009 special election to replace his father, seven term Representative Thomas C. Slater. 2010 saw Slater challenged in the September 23, 2010 Democratic Primary, winning with 1,209 votes (61.1%) and winning the November 2, 2010 General election with 2,023 votes (89.7%) against Republican nominee Brian Mayben. 2012 Slater was unopposed for the September 11, 2012 Democratic Primary, winning with 680 votes and won the November 6, 2012 General election with 2,896 votes (90.4%) against Republican nominee James Entwistle.

In 2014, police cleared Slater of any wrongdoing after an investigation into his handling of a mail ballot. The investigation happened after a video appeared of Slater carrying what appeared to be a ballot.

=== Recent petitions ===
On March 28, 2017, the Legislative Oversight Commission of the Edward O. Hawkins and Thomas C. Slater Medical Marijuana Act met for the first time, with Slater included as the representative of the House. His father had pushed the bill through eight years earlier. As of April 2017, he was speaking out as a proponent of the legalization of marijuana in his state, arguing it could be a good source of tax revenue beyond what the state already took in from medical marijuana. In April 2017, he opposed a bill to create a statewide drinking water board "with the authority to negotiate partial or full acquisitions of water systems in the state," arguing the bill was "deliberately vague on the details" and didn't specify a process. As of May 2017, he and Josh Miller were the primary sponsors of legislation to legalize marijuana.

== See also ==
- Rhode Island House of Representatives
