= Peter Petrarca =

American politician

Member of the Rhode Island House of Representatives from the 44th district
- In office January 7, 2003 – January 1, 2013
- Preceded by: Suzanne Henseler
- Succeeded by: Gregory Costantino

Personal details
- Born: July 24, 1974 (age 52)
- Party: Democratic

Peter Petrarca (born July 24, 1974) is an American politician who served in the Rhode Island House of Representatives from the 44th district from 2003 to 2013.
