= J. Fairfax McLaughlin =

J. Fairfax McLaughlin may be:

- J. Fairfax McLaughlin (author), American author; see Pasquinade
- J. Fairfax McLaughlin (politician), New York politician; see 143rd New York State Legislature

== See also ==
- James McLaughlin (disambiguation)
