= James N. McLaughlin =

American politician

James McLaughlin

Member of the Rhode Island House of Representatives from the 57th district
- In office January 2011 – January 2023
- Preceded by: Kenneth A. Vaudreuil
- Succeeded by: Brandon Voas

Personal details
- Born: November 6, 1943 (age 82)
- Party: Democratic
- Website: electjimmclaughlin.com

James N. McLaughlin (born November 6, 1943) is an American politician and a former Democratic member of the Rhode Island House of Representatives representing District 57 from 2011 to 2023.

He lost renomination to Brandon Voas in 2022.

== Elections ==
- 2012 McLaughlin was unopposed for both the September 11, 2012 Democratic Primary, winning with 888 votes and the November 6, 2012 General election, winning with 3,851 votes.
- 2010 McLaughlin challenged District 57 Democratic Representative Kenneth A. Vaudreuil in the September 23, 2010 Democratic Primary, winning by 82 votes with 879 votes (52.4%) and was unopposed for the November 2, 2010 General election, winning with 2,988 votes.
