= Mario Mendez (politician) =

American politician

Member of the Rhode Island House of Representatives from the 13th district
- In office January 1, 2019 – January 5, 2021
- Preceded by: Ramon Perez
- Succeeded by: Ramon Perez

Personal details
- Born: June 21, 1989 (age 37)
- Party: Democratic
- Education: Rhode Island College (BA)

Mario Mendez (born June 21, 1989) is a former member of the Rhode Island House of Representatives from the 13th district. Elected in November 2018, he assumed office on January 1, 2019.

== Background ==
Mendez was raised in Johnston, Rhode Island. He earned a Bachelor of Arts degree from Rhode Island College. Mendez was elected to the Rhode Island House of Representatives in November 2018 and assumed office on January 1, 2019. In his 2020 re-election campaign, Mendez lost the Democratic primary to Ramon Perez, who had previously represented the district from 2017 to 2018.
