= Brianna Henries =

American politician

Member of the Rhode Island House of Representatives from the 64th district
- In office January 5, 2021 – January 7, 2025
- Preceded by: Jose Serodio
- Succeeded by: Jenni Furtado

Personal details
- Born: February 27, 1991 (age 35) Providence, Rhode Island, U.S.
- Party: Democratic

Brianna Escelia Henries (born February 27, 1991) is an American politician and esthetician who served as a member of the Rhode Island House of Representatives from the 64th district. Elected in November 2020, she assumed office on January 5, 2021.

== Early life and education ==
Henries was born in Providence, Rhode Island and raised in Warwick.

== Career ==
Outside of politics, Henries has worked as a theater teacher with Valiant Arts Studio and as a retail manager and makeup artist with Bare Minerals. She was elected to the Rhode Island House of Representatives in November 2020 and assumed office on January 5, 2021. She served two terms, and announced in May 2024 that she would not run for a third.

Preceded by Jose Serodio	Representative, Rhode Island House of Representatives; District 64; 2021 - 2025	Succeeded by Jenni Furtado
