= Kenneth A. Vaudreuil =

American politician

Member of the Rhode Island House of Representatives from the 57th district
- In office 2 January 2007 – 4 January 2011
- Preceded by: Joseph P. Moran, III (D-57)
- Succeeded by: James N. McLaughlin (D-57)

Personal details
- Born: September 30, 1956 (age 70)
- Party: Democratic
- Spouse: Joy
- Children: Brett
- Education: Central Fall High School
- Profession: Municipal government worker

Kenneth A. Vaudreuil (born 1956) is an American politician who is a Democratic member of the Rhode Island House of Representatives, representing the 57th District since 2007. During the 2009-2010 sessions, he served on the House Committees on Labor, Environment and Natural Resources, Municipal Government, and Small Business, as well as the Permanent Joint Committee on Lottery. He also served as the Deputy Majority Leader. Vaudreuil was defeated in his bid for reelection in the 14 September 2010 Democratic primary to James N. McLaughlin, who went on to win the subsequent November general election.
