= James Jackson (Rhode Island politician) =

American politician

Member of the Rhode Island House of Representatives from the 26th district
- In office January 1, 2019 – January 4, 2021
- Preceded by: Patricia Morgan
- Succeeded by: Patricia Morgan

Personal details
- Born: West Warwick, Rhode Island, U.S.
- Party: Democratic
- Education: University of Rhode Island

James Jackson is an American politician. He served as a Democratic member for the 26th district of the Rhode Island House of Representatives.

Jackson was born in West Warwick, Rhode Island. He attended the University of Rhode Island, earning a Bachelor of Arts degree in economics in 1986, and was previously a member of the United States Navy.

In 2018, Jackson was elected for the 26th district of the Rhode Island House of Representatives, serving until 2021. He ran for re-election in 2020, but lost the race to and was succeeded by Republican Patricia Morgan, who had previously held the same seat from 2011 to 2019, and ran for Governor of Rhode Island in 2018 instead of seeking re-election in that cycle.
