= Jose Batista (politician) =

American politician and lawyer

Member of the Rhode Island House of Representatives from the 12th district
- Incumbent
- Assumed office January 5, 2021
- Preceded by: Joseph Almeida
- Succeeded by: Arlette Hidalgo (elect)

Personal details
- Born: 1988 (age 37–38)
- Party: Democratic

Jose Batista (born 1988) is an American politician and lawyer who has represented District 12 in the Rhode Island House of Representatives since January 5, 2021.

== Career ==
Prior to being elected to the state house, Batista served as executive director of the Providence External Review Authority (PERA), which is responsible for providing civilian oversight of the Providence Police Department. Batista was fired from his job as executive director in November 2020, shortly after being elected to the state house, after releasing two videos of an incident of police brutality, which had led to a police sergeant being arrested, in opposition to the decision of PERA, which had opted not to release the videos to the public.

Batista had considered running for the position of Rhode Island Attorney General in 2018, but opted against it. In 2020, he ran for the Rhode Island House, seeking to primary incumbent representative Joseph Almeida. Almeida later withdrew from the race and endorsed another Democrat, Carlos Cedeno. Batista defeated Cedeno in the primary, and faced no opposition in the general election.
