= Joseph Almeida =

Cape Verdean American politician

Member of the Rhode Island House of Representatives from the 12th (Providence) district
- In office January 2015 – January 5, 2021
- Preceded by: Leo Medina
- Succeeded by: Jose Batista
- In office 5 January 1999 – 4 January 2011
- Succeeded by: Leo Medina

Personal details
- Born: Joseph S. Almeida, Jr. September 23, 1957 (age 68)
- Party: Democratic
- Children: 5
- Education: Roger Williams College

Joseph S. Almeida, Jr. (born September 23, 1957) is a Cape Verdean American politician who served as the Rhode Island State Representative for the 12th District from 2015 to 2021. He is a member of the Democratic Party.

== Biography ==
Almeida was born on September 23, 1957, in Providence, Rhode Island. He attended high school at the La Salle Academy, graduating in 1975, and majored with a Bachelor of Arts from the Roger Williams College in 1990. He is married and has 5 children. In September 1997, Almeida retired as a Providence police officer.

== Political career ==
Almeida was a financial strategist and owned a bar prior to being first elected a Rhode Island State Representative, on November 3, 1998. Almeida kept his seat in the general assembly until September 14, 2010, when he lost to Leo Medina in the general election. Almeida was elected again in November 2012 and returned to represent District 12.

During his second term in office, Almeida was elected as the majority leader for the Democratic party on March 25, 2014. Following his arrest in 2015, Almeida resigned from his position as party leader.

=== Arrest ===
On February 10, 2015, Almeida was arrested and charged by Rhode Island State Police for misappropriating $6,122 in campaign funds for personal use. Almeida pleaded no contest. In a court hearing in May 2015, Almeida was given a $1,000 fine and a year on probation.

== Personal life ==
=== Lawsuit ===
On September 16, 1996, Almeida's wife Denise Welsey died at the Rhode Island Hospital from a pulmonary embolism. After his wife's death, Almeida filed a wrongful death claim against the hospital. The lawsuit was brought to trial in May 2003 and ended with a financial settlement of an estimated $200,000.
