= Michael Morin =

American politician

Member of the Rhode Island House of Representatives from the 49th district
- In office March 4, 2014 – January 5, 2021
- Preceded by: Lisa Baldelli-Hunt
- Succeeded by: Steven J. Lima

Personal details
- Born: c. 1965 (age 60–61)
- Party: Democratic
- Education: Community College of Rhode Island
- Profession: Fire captain

Michael A. Morin is an American politician and a Democratic member of the Rhode Island House of Representatives representing District 49 since March 4, 2014.

== Education ==
Morin attended the Community College of Rhode Island.

== Elections ==
- 2014 In the special election to replace Representative Lisa Baldelli-Hunt, Morin won the three-way January 21, 2014 Democratic Primary with 344 votes (52.3%) and won the February 25, 2014 General election with 233 votes (83.5%) against write-in candidates.
- 2012 Morin challenged District 3 incumbent Representative Baldelli-Hunt in the three-way September 11, 2012 Democratic Primary but lost to Representative Baldelli-Hunt, who went on to win re-election in the November 6, 2012 General election against Republican nominee Michael Moniz. Baldelli-Hunt won election to mayor of Woonsocket during the term, and resigned to take the position.
