= Carlos Tobon =

American politician

Member of the Rhode Island House of Representatives from the 58th district
- In office January 6, 2015 – January 3, 2023
- Preceded by: William San Bento
- Succeeded by: Cherie Cruz

Personal details
- Born: February 3, 1982 (age 44)
- Party: Democratic
- Spouse: Alejandra Tobon
- Children: 2
- Education: Community College of Rhode Island; University of Rhode Island

Carlos Tobon (born February 3, 1982) is an American politician. He served as a Democratic member for the 58th district of the Rhode Island House of Representatives.

Tobon attended William E. Tolman High School, where he graduated in 2000. He then attended the Community College of Rhode Island and University of Rhode Island. In 2015, Tobon was elected for the 58th district of the Rhode Island House of Representatives, succeeding William San Bento. Tobon assumed office on January 6, 2015.
