= Gregory Costantino =

Member of the Rhode Island House of Representatives

Greg Costantino

Member of the Rhode Island House of Representatives from the 44th district
- Incumbent
- Assumed office January 1, 2013
- Preceded by: Peter Petrarca

Personal details
- Born: August 11, 1960 (age 65)
- Party: Democratic
- Website: costantino2012.com

Gregory J. Costantino (born August 11, 1960) is an American politician and a Democratic member of the Rhode Island House of Representatives. He has represented District 44 since January 1, 2013. Outside of his work in government, Costantino works as the vice president of operations for Venda Ravioli.

== Education ==
Costantino graduated from La Salle Academy in 1978.

== Elections ==
- 2012 Costantino challenged District 44 incumbent Democratic Representative Peter Petrarca in the September 11, 2012 Democratic Primary, winning with 1,039 votes (60%) and won the November 6, 2012 General election with 4,647 votes (62.1%) against Republican nominee James Archer.
