= Jean Philippe Barros =

American politician

Member of the Rhode Island House of Representatives from the 59th district
- In office January 6, 2015 – January 3, 2023
- Preceded by: J. Patrick O'Neill
- Succeeded by: Jennifer Stewart

Personal details
- Party: Democratic

Jean Philippe Barros is an American politician. He served as a Democratic member for the 59th district of the Rhode Island House of Representatives.

In 2015, Barros won the election for the 59th district of the Rhode Island House of Representatives. He succeeded J. Patrick O'Neill. Barros assumed his office on January 6, 2015. He decided to run for re-election for the 59th district.
