= Robert A. Watson =

American politician

Bob Watson

Minority Leader of the Rhode Island House of Representatives
- In office 1998 – May 2011
- Succeeded by: Brian Newberry

Member of the Rhode Island House of Representatives from the 30th district
- In office January 2003 – Summer 2012
- Preceded by: Paul Sherlock
- Succeeded by: Antonio Giarrusso

Member of the Rhode Island House of Representatives from the 43rd district
- In office January 1993 – January 2003
- Preceded by: David Dumas
- Succeeded by: Joseph Vococola

Member of the Rhode Island Senate from the 22nd district
- In office January 1989 – January 1991
- Preceded by: Stephen Deutsch
- Succeeded by: Michael Lenihan

Personal details
- Born: October 14, 1960 (age 66)
- Party: Republican
- Education: University of Denver, Columbus School of Law
- Profession: Attorney

Robert A. Watson (born October 14, 1960) is an American attorney and former Republican member of the Rhode Island House of Representatives, representing the 30th District and previously the 43rd District. He is a former House Minority Leader. He was arrested twice for marijuana possession and was arrested for a third offense of vandalizing a bank. He resigned in the summer of 2012.

== Early life, education, and law career ==
Watson was born in 1960 in Providence, Rhode Island. He attended Bishop Hendricken High School in Warwick. He earned a Bachelor of Arts degree at the University of Denver in 1982, and attended the Columbus School of Law of the Catholic University of America, graduating with a Juris Doctor degree in 1986. Watson is a practicing attorney and member of the Rhode Island and American Bar Associations.

== Rhode Island legislature ==
=== Elections ===
1988–1990

Watson was elected to Rhode Island's 22nd Senate District, based in East Greenwich and Warwick. In 1990, he ran for re-election but lost to Democrat Michael Lenihan by a narrow margin.

1992–2000

After redistricting, he was elected to the Rhode Island House of Representatives in 1992 from the 43rd district. He defeated Democrat Linda Seiler and Independent David Zartarian. In 1994, he won re-election to a second term defeating Democrat David Zartarian. In 1996, he won re-election to a third term unopposed. In 1998, he won re-election to a fourth term defeating Democrat Gregory DeGroot. In 2000, he won re-election to a fifth term against Reform party nominee Timothy Miller.

2002–2012

Upon redistricting and downsizing of the RI House from 100 to 75 members in 2002, Watson ran in the newly redrawn 30th House District, based in East and West Greenwich. He won re-election to a sixth term unopposed. He ran unopposed in 2004 to his seventh term. In 2006, he won re-election to an eighth term with 57% of the vote. In 2008, he won re-election to a ninth term 54%-46%, winning in eight of nine precincts. In 2010, he won re-election a tenth term with 57% of the vote. He resigned in 2012.

=== Tenure ===
In February 2011, he made a joke in private meeting saying "I guess that if you are a Guatemalan gay man who likes to gamble and smokes marijuana, you probably think we're onto some good ideas here."

In 2005, he sponsored legislation that would legalize medical marijuana.

Watson served as Minority Leader from November 1998 to May 2011.

He ran for Speaker of the Rhode Island House of Representatives four times. The closest Watson ever got was when Republicans had 12 seats in the State House in 2003.

=== Committee assignments ===
During the 2009-2010 legislative session, Watson served on the Health, Education and Welfare Committee and the Joint Committee on Legislative Services. He served as the chairman of the East Greenwich Republican Town Committee from 1990 to 1992. He's also on the Commission on Judicial Tenure and Discipline.

== Personal life ==
He lives in East Greenwich, Rhode Island.

=== Legal trouble ===
Watson was stopped in East Haven, Connecticut at a police checkpoint on Friday, April 22, 2011. He was charged with possession of marijuana and drug paraphernalia after it was noted that a strong odor of marijuana was emanating from his car. He was also charged with driving under the influence. After further analysis of his urine by the Connecticut Toxicological Lab, Watson's blood alcohol content was determined to be .07, below the legal limit of .08. Traces of marijuana and cocaine were also found.

On Jan 22, 2012 Robert Watson was arrested in South Kingston, RI for possession of marijuana and related paraphernalia. He was found to also have 3 open containers of alcohol in his possession.

On November 6, 2017 Watson was arrested for attacking a bank and then breaking and entering into a neighbor's home. According to the police report he was naked and bleeding at the time.
