= Ramon Perez (politician) =

Dominican-American politician (born 1971)

Member of the Rhode Island House of Representatives from the 13th district
- Incumbent
- Assumed office January 5, 2021
- Preceded by: Mario Mendez
- In office January 1, 2017 – December 31, 2018
- Preceded by: John Carnevale
- Succeeded by: Mario Mendez

Personal details
- Born: Ramón A. Perez, Jr. November 20, 1971 (age 54) Santo Domingo, Dominican Republic
- Party: Democratic

Ramon A. Perez, Jr. (Spanish: Ramón; born November 20, 1971) is a Dominican-American politician and businessman who serves as a member of the Rhode Island House of Representatives from the 13th district. Elected in 2016, he assumed office in 2017 and left office on January 1, 2019 after his re-election defeat. He was re-elected to the same seat in 2020.

== Early life ==
Perez was raised in Santo Domingo, Dominican Republic.

== Career ==
Perez owned New England Taxi and worked as a founding member of the Taxi Driver Union in Providence, Rhode Island. Perez was an unsuccessful candidate for the Rhode Island Senate in 2012 and 2014. In 2016, he was elected to the Rhode Island House of Representatives. In January 2018, Perez was accused of inappropriate behavior during a workplace sexual harassment training session by fellow representative Moira Walsh. After more allegations surfaced, Perez claimed that his statements made during the training session were misinterpreted because of his accent.

In the 2018 Democratic primary, Perez was defeated by Mario Mendez. Perez sought re-election to his old seat in the 2020 election, defeating Mendez in the Democratic primary.
