= J. H. McLaughlin =

American professional wrestler (1844–1905)

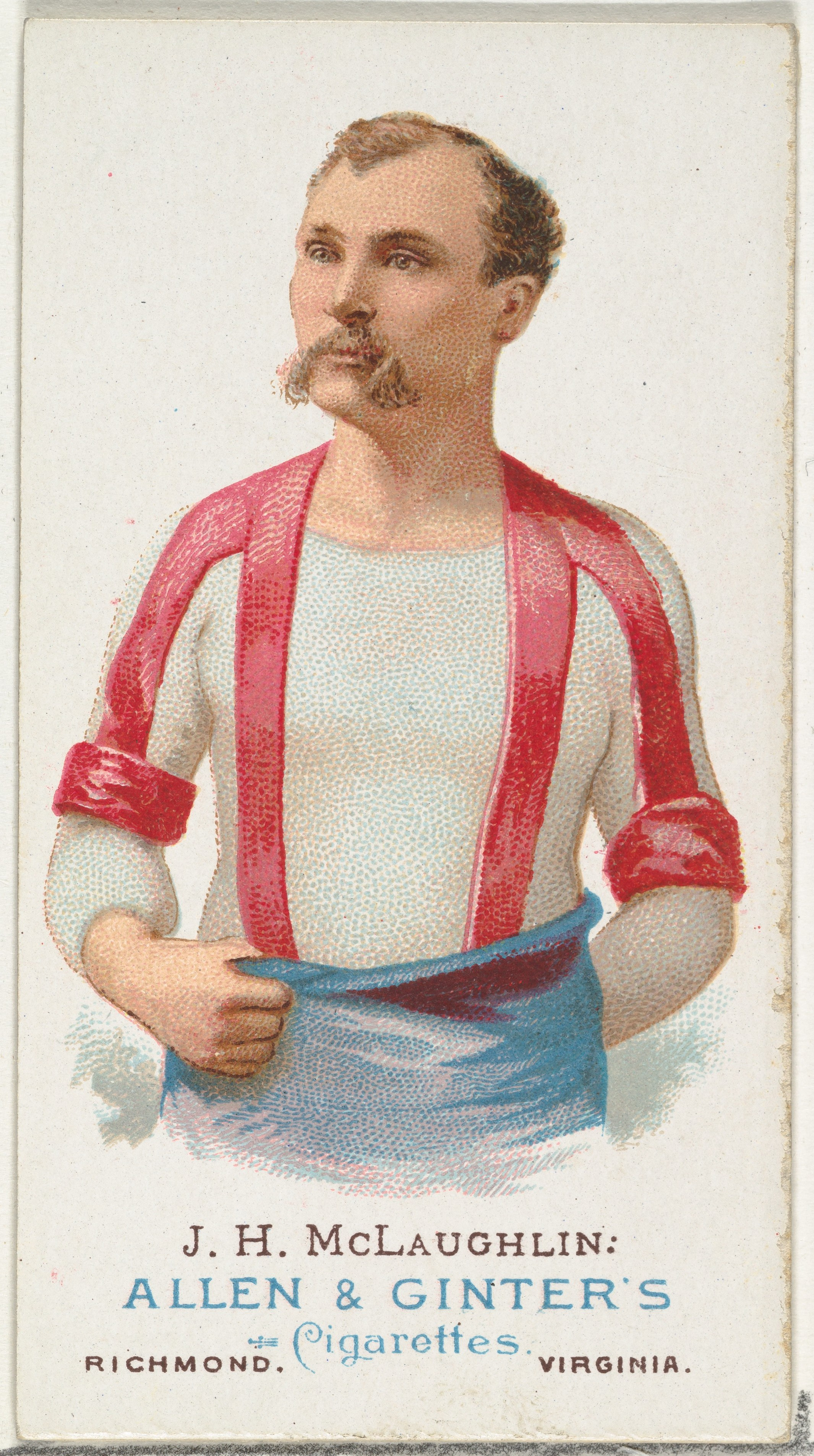
McLaughlin for Allen & Ginter cigarettes, 1887

James Hiram McLaughlin (June 8, 1844 – September 11, 1905) (also known as Colonel J. H. McLaughlin or simply J. H. McLaughlin) was a wrestling champion in the United States in the 19th century. He is generally considered the first American professional wrestling champion, and along with William Muldoon, was one of the two key people to establish and popularize professional wrestling in the United States. The 6-foot-1 McLaughlin weighed between 215 and 265 pounds, depending on whether he'd kept himself in fighting shape. He was born in Oriskany Falls, New York.

McLaughlin was known for his superior Irish-style "collar-and-elbow" standing skills, in which throwing an opponent was the aim. However, he also excelled at the rougher, undisciplined catch-as-catch-can style which was then prominent, and three opponents are known to have died as a result of wrestling McLaughlin.

He participated in mixed style wrestling matches, including Cornish wrestling, towards the end of the 1800s.

Newspaper accounts of the time are sometimes exaggerated, and even in the late 19th century, numerous fans and reporters already regarded the burgeoning sport's credibility with skepticism. However, contemporary reports of McLaughlin's earnings, including the side bets that were commonly several multiples of his official pay, indicate that he was phenomenally well-compensated. Adjusting for inflation, it is possible that he was the highest-paid wrestler in history.

== Career ==
McLaughlin's wrestling career began in earnest with a few matches just before the U.S. Civil War. His first was in 1859 against the irascible Hiram McKee. Though half McKee's age, McLaughlin may have outweighed his opponent, who he successfully pinned. When McKee angrily demanded a rematch, McLaughlin lost his temper and threw McKee to the ground, fracturing McKee's leg. McKee fought for the Union Army during the war, while continuing to pursue wrestling, which was a popular pastime among the troops. After defeating Louis Ainsworth in 1866 or 1867, McLaughlin declared himself to be the collar-and-elbow champion of America. Even after losing a bout to Homer Lane in 1868, the public still regarded McLaughlin's claim to the title.

In March 1870, a tournament was held, and is believed to have been wholly legitimate. McLaughlin emerged as the winner, and was awarded a belt with a gold buckle, which he would later put at stake in matches. In the tournament final, McLaughlin was safely ahead in a match against Barney Smith, but the referee declined to end the match. McLaughlin ended the match by either slamming Smith on his head or off the stage (accounts differ), delivering an impact which led to Smith's mental incapacitation and eventual death from cranial trauma. The remorseful McLaughlin gave his tournament winnings to Smith's widow, saying "I forgot I was so wicked strong."

McLaughlin successfully defended his golden belt for the next year, before announcing his retirement in mid-1871. Despite remaining inactive for nearly four years, he was generally considered the reigning champion. His next match came in February 1875, with a decisive win over Mike Whalen in which he collected $2,500 for the match itself, and another $15,000 by betting on himself, more than half a million dollars in today's money. McLaughlin did not fight again for a year, winning a January 1876 rematch against Joe Benjamin, who he'd beaten five years earlier. He fought several times that year, including two draws and a win against James H. Martin. But the year took its toll on McLaughlin's opponents. Dutch Hogan died after wrestling McLaughlin, and Charles Meier was paralyzed. It was at this point that McLaughlin publicly declared his intention to restrict his future fights to collar-and-elbow rules, rather than the anything-goes style that led to those in-ring tragedies.

In December 1876, McLaughlin injured his heel in an exhibition tune-up match, leaving him at a disadvantage for a title match against James Owens a few weeks later. That bout lasted more than five hours, with McLaughlin protecting his injured foot, and Owens being reluctant to press the advantage against the larger and stronger McLaughlin. Ultimately Owens won the title in two straight falls.

McLaughlin spent a few months healing before winning three matches in the spring, then retired again. McLaughlin gained a substantial amount of weight during his sabbatical, but was lured out of retirement in November 1878 against the formidable John McMahon. McLaughlin defeated McMahon in a rematch three weeks later, and a third contest the following March resulted in a draw.

Almost four years later, at the end of 1882, McLaughlin beat Canadian champion Edras Lambert. In 1884, he reentered the competition with a series of bouts. In January, he beat top star H.M. Dufur to capture his third collar-and-elbow championship. In March, he lost to Duncan C. Ross, then beat Ross three weeks later, then lost a rematch to Dufur three weeks after that. A month later, in June, he defeated Dufur for his fourth title, before relinquishing it to Dufur at the end of July. Wrestling reporter/historian Dave Meltzer believes the back-and-forth results and the shortened time between the matches suggests that the sequence and outcomes of these matches were most likely deliberately prearranged by the wrestlers to excite public interest, and maximize the payout. Four months later, McLaughlin split a pair of matches with William Muldoon in November and December. Muldoon won the rematch, and assumed McLaughlin's spot as the nation's preeminent wrestling star.

The second Muldoon match marked the effective end of McLaughlin's professional career and title hopes. However, in 1901, McLaughlin emerged in the Yukon Territory as part of a threesome of wrestlers, travelling from town to town pretending to confront and challenge one another over the "real" championship. The other wrestlers, primarily future star Frank Gotch and Joe Carroll, used pseudonyms, but McLaughlin's name was still a draw after forty years. Their alleged antipathy included the first high-profile "three way" match, in which McLaughlin, Gotch and Carroll wrestled one another in five different styles, purportedly to determine which of the three was the most versatile. Gotch would emerge the winner of these round robin challenges.

McLaughlin died four years later, aged 61, on September 11, 1905, in Fairbanks, Alaska.

He was inducted into the Wrestling Observer Newsletter Hall of Fame class of 2016.

== Awards ==
- Wrestling Observer Newsletter
  - Wrestling Observer Newsletter Hall of Fame (Class of 2016)
