= Patricia Morgan =

American politician (born 1950)

Minority Leader of the Rhode Island House of Representatives
- In office January 7, 2017 – October 4, 2018
- Preceded by: Brian Newberry
- Succeeded by: Blake Filippi

Member of the Rhode Island House of Representatives from the 26th district
- In office January 3, 2021 – January 7, 2025
- Preceded by: James Jackson
- Succeeded by: Earl Read III
- In office January 3, 2011 – January 3, 2019
- Preceded by: William Murphy
- Succeeded by: James Jackson

Personal details
- Born: Patricia Lazar; August 25, 1950 (age 75) Ohio, U.S.
- Party: Republican
- Education: Mississippi State University (attended); Kent State University (BA); Rhode Island College (MEd)

Patricia L. Morgan (born August 25, 1950) is an American politician and former Republican member of the Rhode Island House of Representatives representing district 26 from 2021 to 2025. She formerly represented district 26 from 2011 until 2019, where she chose not to run again. She became the first female minority leader of the Rhode Island House of Representatives in 2017, after she was chosen by the Republican caucus members on November 15, 2016, when former minority leader Brian Newberry stepped down from the position.

Morgan ran for Governor of Rhode Island in the 2018 election. She lost the primary to Cranston Mayor and 2014 Republican candidate Allan Fung.

In 2020, Morgan ran for the state House of Representatives again and unseated incumbent Democrat James Jackson. In 2024, she won the Republican primary for Rhode Island's Class I U.S. Senate seat, she lost the general election to Democratic incumbent Sheldon Whitehouse in a landslide.

== Early life ==
Morgan was one of three daughters of Thomas Lazar, a Polish-American World War II veteran, and Doris Lane, a war bride from England. They had married in 1944. In 1958, her father changed his surname to Lane because he'd been bullied as a child over his heritage and didn't want his daughters to suffer the same experience. She grew up in Canal Fulton, Ohio, the youngest of three daughters. She graduated class valedictorian from Northwest High School. She then married her boyfriend, Bernie Mulligan, who was a Navy aviator.

== Education ==
Morgan attended Mississippi State University, earned her BA degree from Kent State University, where she witnessed the Kent State Shootings in 1970, her MEd from Rhode Island College, and principal's certificate from Providence College.

== Career ==
After graduating from college, she worked as a special education teacher for several years. She moved to Rhode Island when her husband was stationed there in 1976. She resumed her teaching career in 1985. After a decade of teaching there, she joined the investment firm of Salomon Smith Barney as a financial advisor.

== Elections ==
- 2004 To challenge District 26 incumbent Representative Murphy, Morgan was unopposed for the 2004 Republican Primary, but lost to the November 2, 2004 General election to Representative Murphy.
- 2010 When Democratic Representative William Murphy retired and left the seat open, Morgan was unopposed for the September 23, 2010 Republican Primary, winning with 220 votes and won the November 2, 2010 General election by 90 votes with 2,239 votes (51%) against Democratic nominee Michael Senerchia.
- 2012 Morgan was unopposed for the September 11, 2012 Republican Primary, winning with 129 votes and won the November 6, 2012 General election with 2,849 votes (52.1%) against Democratic nominee Nicholas Denice.
- 2014 Morgan was unopposed for the September 9, 2014 Republican Primary, winning with 376 votes and won the November 4, 2014 General election with 2,104 votes (50.1%) against Democratic nominee Nicholas Denice who had 1,816 votes (43.2%) and Moderate Paul Caianiello Jr. who had 275 votes (6.6%).
- 2016 Morgan was unopposed for the September 13, 2016 Republican Primary and won the November 8, 2016 General election with 3,192 votes (55.2%) against Democratic nominee Anthony J. Paolino who had 2,079 votes (35.9%) and Independent Vincent Marzullo who had 504 votes (8.7%).
- 2024 Morgan ran in the Republican primary for the 2024 United States Senate election in Rhode Island and won the primary with 12,108 votes (64.4%) against Raymond McKay, who had 6,681 votes (35.56%). She lost the general election to incumbent Democrat Sheldon Whitehouse, who had 294,665 votes (59.9%); Morgan had 196,039 votes (39.8%), and write-in candidates had 1,244 votes (0.3%).

== Controversies ==
Morgan complained on 28 December 2021 via Twitter that a friendship she had with an African American friend had become "hostile and unpleasant." Morgan largely attributed this hostility to efforts by teachers and the political left's support for critical race theory. Her tweet has been condemned by both Democrats and the GOP, and the BLM RI PAC, the political arm of the Black Lives Matter movement in Rhode Island, has called for her removal from committee assignments in the RI General Assembly.

Rhode Island House of Representatives
Preceded by Brian Newberry	Minority Leader of the Rhode Island House of Representatives; 2017–2018	Succeeded by Blake Filippi
Party political offices
Preceded by Robert Flanders	Republican nominee for U.S. Senator from Rhode Island (Class 1); 2024	Most recent
