= Robert Craven =

Member of the Rhode Island House of Representatives

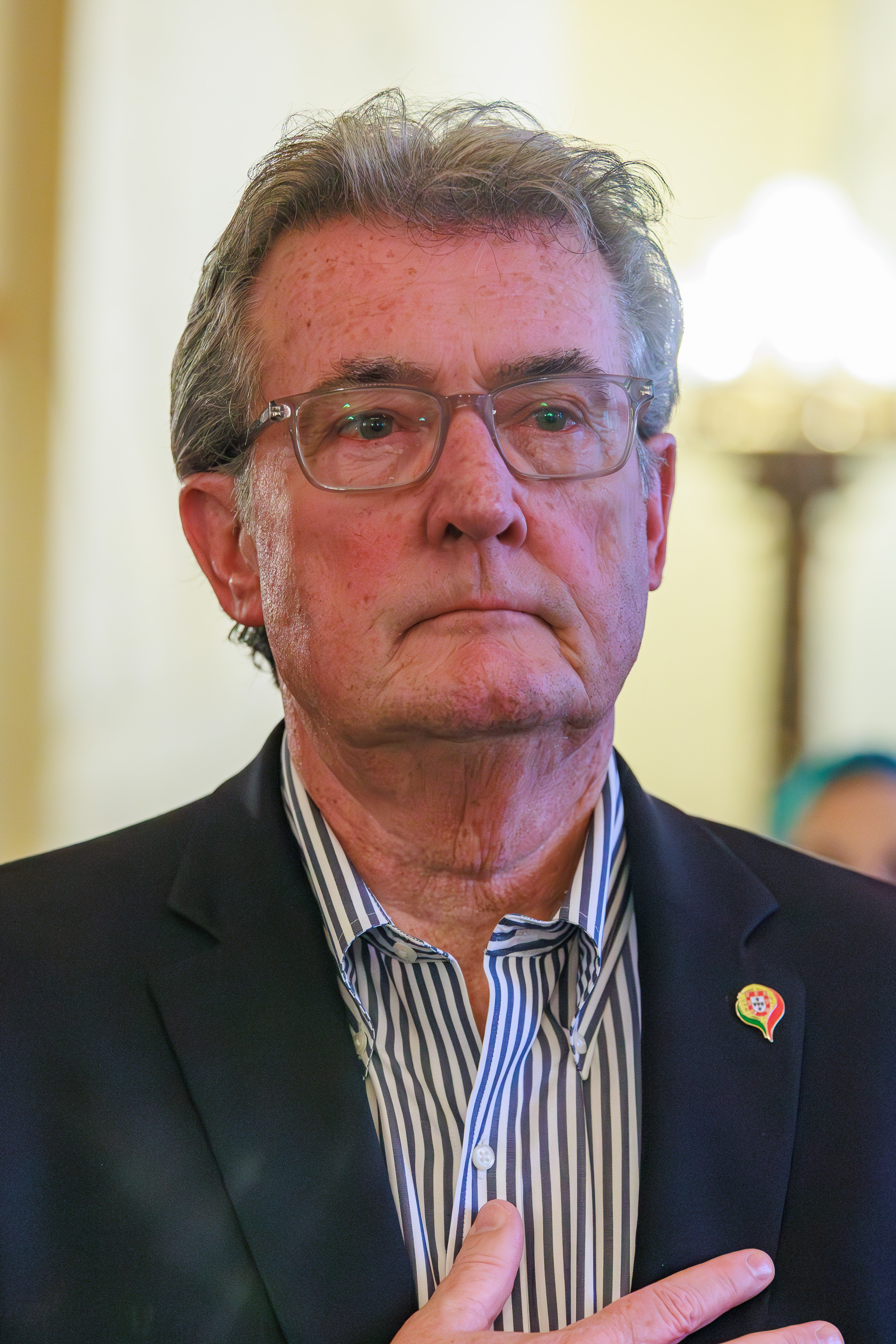

Member of the Rhode Island House of Representatives from the 32nd district
- Incumbent
- Assumed office January 1, 2013
- Preceded by: Laurence Ehrhardt

Personal details
- Born: Robert Emmett Craven Sr. November 19, 1955 (age 70) Providence, Rhode Island, U.S.
- Party: Democratic
- Spouse: Susan
- Children: 2
- Education: University of Rhode Island (BA); New England School of Law (JD)
- Website: Campaign website

Robert Emmett Craven Sr. (born November 19, 1955) is an American politician and a Democrat in the Rhode Island House of Representatives representing District 32 since January 1, 2013. He serves as Chairman of the House Municipal Government Committee and a member of the House Judiciary Committee. Craven also serves on the R.I. Governor's Justice Reinvestment Working Group.

== Education ==
Chairman Craven graduated from La Salle Academy in Providence, Rhode Island in 1974. He earned his BA (Bachelor of Arts) from the University of Rhode Island and his JD (Doctor of Jurisprudence) from the New England School of Law.

== Elections ==
- 2016 – On November 8, 2011, Rep. Bob Craven was re-elected as Rhode Island State Representative of District 32 (North Kingstown). Craven received 4327 (55.5%) votes while his opponent, Mark S. Zaccaria, received 3455 (44.3%) votes.
- 2014 – On November 4, 2014, Craven was re-elected as Rhode Island State Representative of District 32 (North Kingstown). Craven received 3111 (51.9%) votes while his opponent, Sharon L. Gamba, received 2867 (47.8%) votes.
- 2012 – Craven was unopposed in the September 11, 2012, Democratic Primary, winning with 326 votes. On November 6, 2012, he won the general election for District 32 (North Kingstown) with 4,067 votes (54%) against the incumbent Republican Representative Laurence Ehrhardt's 3,440 (45.7%).

== Legislation ==
Rep. Robert E. Craven, during his time in the Rhode Island House of Representatives, is responsible for legislation that:

- Exempted social security income from taxation
- Improved Rhode Island's estate tax, resulting in reduced/lowered taxes
- Expanded legal protections for those who seek medical assistance for individuals experiencing a drug overdose (the "Good Samaritan" bill)
- Eliminated the "master lever" on election ballots
- Obtained $6 million in federal funds to repair storm-damaged piers at Quonset Business Park
- Increased criminal penalties for DUIs with children in car
- Prioritized restitution payments to crime victims
- Barred sales and ownership of guns with altered serial numbers
- Amended the State False Claim Act, allowing Rhode Island to continue receiving federal funding
- Permitted local law enforcement departments share in litter fines
- Required all children's jewelry to conform higher safety standards
- Reformed the Rhode Island campaign finance system, requiring politicians to keep campaign accounts separate from personal accounts
- Prohibited electronic tracking of automobiles
- Allowed police officers in a close pursuit to conduct a vehicle stop in a neighboring municipality
- Required sex traffickers to register as sex offenders
- Improved safety measures in "School Zones"

== Professional ==
Robert E. Craven was admitted to the Rhode Island Bar in 1983. From 1983 to 1992, he was an Assistant Attorney General for the State of Rhode Island and the Chief of the Public Corruptions Unit. He has also served as the president and a member of the board of directors from 1993 to 1996 at the Center for Non-Violence in Providence, Rhode Island. He served as a member of the Town Council of North Kingstown, Rhode Island, from 1994 to 1996. He was the Town Solicitor in Foster, RI from 1998 to 2004, and he holds the same position in Charlestown, RI (2007–present).

Craven is the sole proprietor of a private-practice law firm in North Kingstown, RI.
