= Rhode Island Patient Advocacy Coalition =

US organization

The Rhode Island Patient Advocacy Coalition (RIPAC) is Rhode Island's non-profit grassroots medical marijuana community. Patients, caregivers, doctors, nurses, health care providers, advocates, lawyers, organizations, and residents all make up a part of the coalition. RIPAC advances discourse, research, and policy related to medical marijuana in four main areas: patient advocacy, professional education, research, and policy development. RIPAC works to protect the medical use of marijuana under state law by facilitating dialogue among patients, medical professionals, law enforcement, and policymakers.

== History ==
RIPAC began organizing in 2003 to protect Rhode Island citizens who were using cannabis for medical reasons. In 2006, the General Assembly overwhelmingly approved the Medical Marijuana Act and established the Rhode Island Medical Marijuana Program.

=== The Edward O. Hawkins and Thomas C. Slater Medical Marijuana Act ===
The Edward O. Hawkins and Thomas C. Slater Medical Marijuana Act allows licensed patients to legally possess up to 2.5 ounces of marijuana and 12 plants and 12 seedlings. The Act also allows licensed patients to appoint up to two caregivers to assist them in obtaining and cultivating medical cannabis within the limits set forth in law. In 2009, the law was amended to include the licensing of compassion centers to provide patients with increased access to medical marijuana.

The Act allows any Rhode Island citizen/resident who suffers from one of the qualifying conditions and whose physician is supportive of their use of cannabis to treat that condition. The qualifying conditions include cancer, glaucoma, positive status for human immunodeficiency virus, acquired immune deficiency syndrome, and hepatitis C, as well as the treatment of a chronic or debilitating disease or medical condition or its treatment that produces one or more of the following:

- cachexia or wasting syndrome
- severe, debilitating chronic pain
- severe nausea
- seizures, including but not limited to those characteristic of epilepsy
- severe and persistent muscle spasms, including but not limited to those characteristic of multiple sclerosis or Crohn's disease; or agitation related to Alzheimer's disease.

On March 28, 2017, the "Legislative Oversight Commission of the Edward O. Hawkins and Thomas C. Slater Medical Marijuana Act" met for the first time, to have six meetings a year.

== Current members ==
Current organizational members of the coalition include:

- Rhode Island Medical Society,
- Rhode Island State Nurses Association,
- Students for Sensible Drug Policy chapters at Brown University, Rhode Island College, and the University of Rhode Island (URI).

== See also ==
- Thomas C. Slater
