= Brian Newberry (politician) =

American politician

Minority Leader of the Rhode Island House of Representatives
- In office May 2011 – January 3, 2017
- Preceded by: Robert Watson
- Succeeded by: Patricia Morgan

Member of the Rhode Island House of Representatives from the 48th district
- Incumbent
- Assumed office January 2009
- Preceded by: Raymond Church

Personal details
- Born: December 10, 1971 (age 54)
- Party: Republican
- Education: University of Pennsylvania; Temple University Beasley School of Law
- Profession: Lawyer

Brian C. Newberry (born December 10, 1971) is an American politician and a Republican member of the Rhode Island House of Representatives representing District 48 since January 2009.

== Education ==
Newberry graduated from the University of Pennsylvania and earned his JD from Temple University Beasley School of Law.

== Elections ==
- 2004 To challenge Senate District 22 Democratic Senator John Tassoni, Newberry was unopposed for the September 14, 2004 Republican Primary, but lost the November 2, 2004 General election to Senator Tassoni.
- 2006 To challenge House District 48 incumbent Democratic Representative Raymond Church, Newberry was unopposed for the September 12, 2006 Republican Primary, but lost the November 7, 2006 General election to Representative Church.
- 2008 Newberry and Representative Church were both unopposed for their September 9, 2008 primaries, setting up a rematch; Newberry won the three-way November 4, 2008 General election against Representative Church and Independent candidate Gary Ezovski.
- 2010 Newberry was unopposed for the September 23, 2010 Republican Primary, winning with 392 votes and won the November 2, 2010 General election with 3,715 votes (66.0%) against Democratic nominee David Lovett.
- 2012 Newberry was unopposed for the September 11, 2012 Republican Primary, winning with 32 votes and won the November 6, 2012 General election with 3,577 votes (51.7%) against Democratic nominee Michael Connolly and Independent candidate Linda Thibault.
