= Gordon Fox =

American politician

Speaker of the Rhode Island House of Representatives
- In office February 11, 2010 – March 22, 2014
- Deputy: Charlene Lima
- Preceded by: Bill Murphy
- Succeeded by: Nicholas Mattiello

Majority Leader of the Rhode Island House of Representatives
- In office January 2003 – February 2010
- Preceded by: Gerard Martineau
- Succeeded by: Nicholas Mattiello

Member of the Rhode Island House of Representatives from the 4th district
- In office January 5, 1993 – January 2015
- Preceded by: Nicholas Tsiongas
- Succeeded by: Aaron Regunberg

Personal details
- Born: Gordon Dennis Fox; December 21, 1961 (age 64) Providence, Rhode Island, U.S.
- Party: Democratic
- Spouse: Marcus LaFond (m. 2013)
- Education: Rhode Island College (BA); Northeastern University (JD)

Gordon Dennis Fox (born December 21, 1961) is an American attorney and politician from Providence, Rhode Island. He served formerly as the Speaker of the Rhode Island House of Representatives, before resigning in disgrace. A member of the Democratic Party, he was first elected to the legislature in 1992. On June 11, 2015 Fox was sentenced to three years in federal prison after pleading guilty to charges including bribery, fraud, and filing a false tax return.

Fox was elected Speaker on February 11, 2010 as the first openly gay Rhode Island man to hold that office. Fox resigned from the Speakership on the evening of March 22, 2014 following an FBI raid on his Smith Hill office and his home on Providence's East Side. The FBI found Fox to have stolen $108,000 in campaign contributions and accepted $52,000 in bribes. He completed his sentence at Canaan U.S. Penitentiary in Waymart, Pennsylvania and was released in February, 2018.

== Early life and career ==
Gordon Dennis Fox was born on December 21, 1961, at Providence, Rhode Island. One of six children, he is the son of Mary Fox and Mr. Fox. Mary Fox was of Cape Verdean lineage, and Mr. Fox was of Irish-American descent. Mr. Fox was an artisan and served as a jewelry polisher, while his wife Mary served on private home staffs and later at a golf ball manufacturer. Fox's parents met while his father was stopped in Providence on return to Boston after service in the Korean War. Fox's father died when he was eighteen.

During his childhood, Fox and his family lived for a time in a Providence home with "a view of the Statehouse". Fox graduated from Classical High School in Providence. He earned a degree in history and political science at Rhode Island College. Fox then earned his Juris Doctor degree from Northeastern University School of Law. While studying there, Fox commuted to Carvel ice cream shop for work. He became an attorney.

== Career ==
Fox unsuccessfully ran for the Providence City Council in the mid-1980s. Soon after, Fox contributed to the campaigns of state representative Ray Rickman, and then state representative Patrick J. Kennedy of Kennedy Family fame.

=== Providence Board of Licenses ===
In 2001, Mayor Buddy Cianci appointed Fox to the Providence Board of Licenses. In 2006 he was appointed vice-chairman of the board. Fox resigned from the Board of Licenses in December 2009.

=== Rhode Island House of Representatives ===
Fox was first elected to the Rhode Island House of Representatives in November 1992. He represented the 4th district, which included parts of the East Side of Providence, namely the Mount Hope, Summit and Blackstone neighborhoods.

In 1993, Fox backed John B. Harwood over the more liberal Russell Bramley for Speaker. He stated that he supported Harwood because he was a departure from the previous House leadership and because he was supported by Fox's mentor, George Caruolo.

In October 2001, Fox became chairman of the House Finance Committee. A year later, in late 2002 Fox was elected Majority Leader.

On March 30, 2004, Fox came out publicly at a rally in support of same-sex marriage at the State House. At the time he came out, Fox was the only openly gay member of the Rhode Island General Assembly.

During his tenure in the House, Fox worked to pass legislation that created a statewide smoking ban, historic tax credit program, affordable housing fund, mental health parity law, and protections for victims of domestic violence. In 2004 he sponsored a Lobbyist Disclosure Law drafted by Common Cause. The following year he sponsored legislation that would have weakened the same law.

=== Speakership ===
As soon as William J. Murphy indicated his intention to retire from the speakership, Fox expressed interest in the position. In October 2009, Murphy endorsed Fox in the race to succeed him. Fox faced conservative Democrat Gregory Schadone and Republican Robert A. Watson in the election held on February 11, 2010. Fox received 51 votes to Schadone's 14 and Watson's 5. He became the state's first African-American and first gay Speaker of the House. He was the first openly gay house speaker in the United States, although Assemblyman John Pérez (D–Los Angeles) was elected to the speakership of the California State Assembly several weeks before Fox. Pérez, however, was not sworn in as speaker until March 1, 2010, whereas Fox took office almost three weeks earlier on February 11.

During Fox's tenure as speaker, the General Assembly voted to legalize same-sex marriage and overhauled the state's pension law, which dramatically reduced its unfunded pension liability. The Assembly also voted to grant 38 Studios, a video-game company owned by Curt Schilling, a $75-million loan that they later defaulted on.

==== LGBT Rights ====
Unlike Senate President M. Teresa Paiva-Weed, who was opposed to same-sex marriage and was known to block attempts to bring the issue before the Senate, Speaker Fox was integral to bringing the legislation to the House floor for votes. Fox would go on to be a key proponent for marriage equality in Rhode Island.

==== Resignation as Speaker ====
On the evening of his arrest on March 21, 2014, under call of then deputy Nicholas Mattiello, a faction of the democratic leadership would meet at the Providence Marriott, to maneuver Fox out. Soon after, Fox would resign as Speaker, and Mattiello, via the meeting he called in the wake of the raid would be installed as Fox's successor in a contentious House of Representatives session which saw its members shouting at each other. Fox remained a member of the house, but did not run for reelection.

== Investigation, plea and conviction ==
In the early morning office hours of Friday, March 21, 2014, Fox's Smith Hill third floor office, and his East Side home were raided by officials of the U.S. Attorney, the Federal Bureau of Investigation, the Internal Revenue Service and the Rhode Island State Police under sealed search warrant. On March 3, 2015, Fox pleaded guilty to wire fraud, bribery and filing a false tax return. Fox admitted to using $108,000 from his campaign account for personal expenses, accepting a $52,000 bribe to push for the issuance of a liquor license for a Providence restaurant in his role as a member of the Board of Licenses, and failing to declare these illegal sources of income on his tax returns. Fox pled guilty and in June, 2015 was sentenced to serve three years in federal prison for public corruption. Fox left prison in February, 2018.

== Controversies ==
In 2004, Fox was fined $10,000 by the state Ethics Commission for voting in favor of granting GTECH Corporation, a company his law firm represented, an exclusive, 20-year, $770 million contract with the Rhode Island Lottery.

During Fox's 2010 run for Speaker, Fox was criticized by his opponents for co-owning a bar with Alex Tomasso, a Providence nightclub owner, while serving on the Providence Board of Licenses, which Tomasso frequently appeared before. Fox and Tomasso's Sandbar & Grill operated in Warwick, Rhode Island from 2006 to 2008. During its run it was frequently visited by police and cited for after-hours drinking, noise complaints, having an underage person present, having a fake entertainment license on the wall, and staging live entertainment without a license. In August 2006 the bar's liquor license was suspended for 90 days by the Warwick Board of Public Safety. The suspension was reduced to 30 days by the state liquor authority in March 2007. Fox recused himself during major votes before the Board of Licenses involving Tomasso, but occasionally voted on smaller issues. Fox was also criticized for voting on issues involving Fatty McGee's, a bar he represented.

Following the collapse of 38 Studios, Fox was criticized for misleading lawmakers by not making clear that $75 million of a $125-million economic development loan-guarantee program were earmarked for the company. He was also criticized for his close, personal connection to Michael Corso, a consultant for 38 Studios. The collapse of 38 Studios caused Fox to face a tough reelection fight in 2012 against independent Mark Binder. Fox defeated Binder 3,328 votes to 2,472.

In January 2014, Fox was fined $1,500 by the state Ethics Commission for violating a state law that requires public officials to file financial disclosures when they do work for public agencies. Fox failed to report the almost $43,000 he earned from preparing loan documents for Providence's economic development agency.

He was awarded an honorary doctorate from Rhode Island College in 2010, but the college rescinded the degree in 2015 stating "Fox has demonstrated a lack of the core values" required.

== Personal life ==
Fox married Marcus LaFond on November 12, 2013 in Fox's state house office. The couple were previously committed to each other in a private ceremony in 1998. In the wake of Rhode Island's Marriage Equality act, a ceremony was officiated by William Guglietta, the Chief Magistrate of the Rhode Island Traffic Court and Fox's former legal counsel, and witnessed by friend and state Health & Human Services Secretary Steven M. Costantino, and the couple was officially entered into the marriage rolls of the state. Fox is Catholic.

Rhode Island House of Representatives
Preceded by Gerard Martineau	Majority Leader of the Rhode Island House of Representatives; 2003–2010	Succeeded by Nicholas Mattiello
Political offices
Preceded by Bill Murphy	Speaker of the Rhode Island House of Representatives; 2010–2014	Succeeded by Nicholas Mattiello
