= Wayland Square =

Classic New England neighborhood

Coordinates: 41.830106°N 71.387779°W

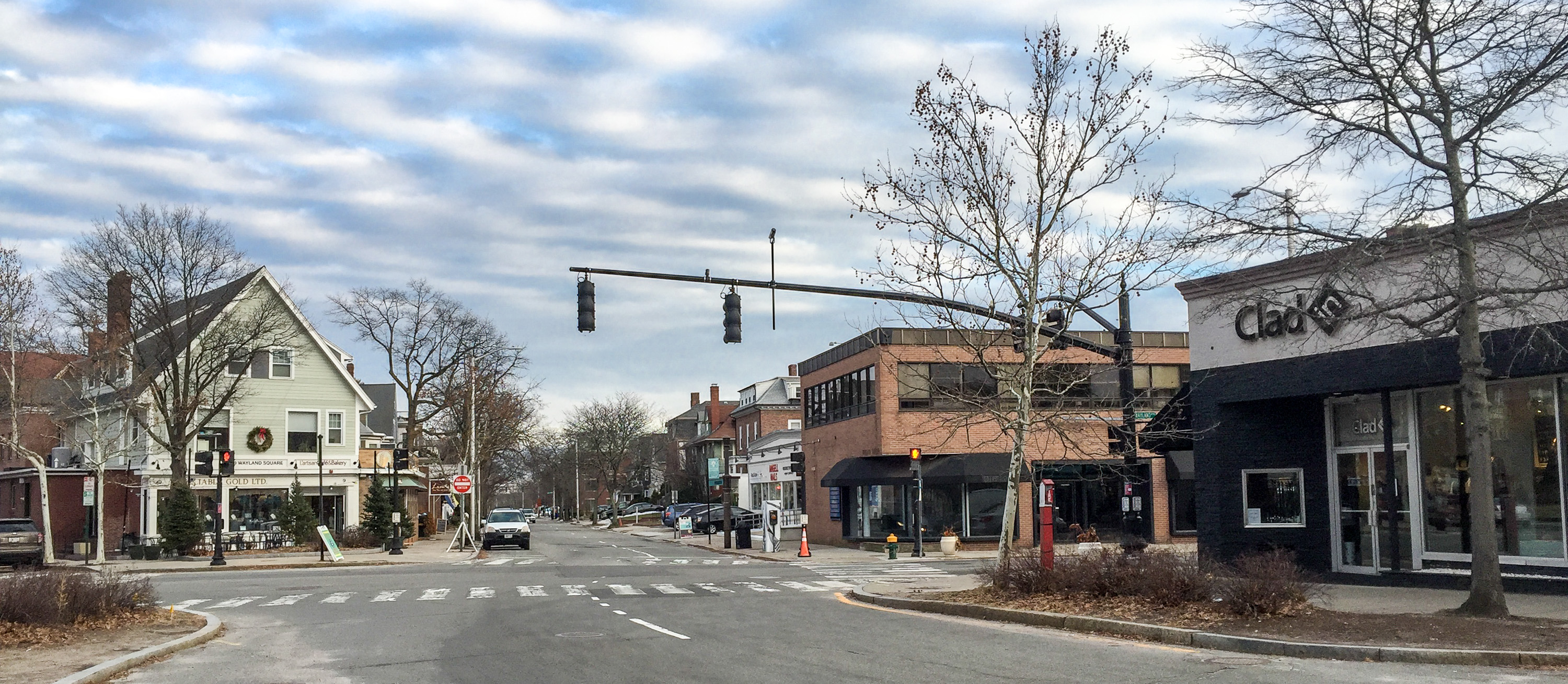
Wayland Square

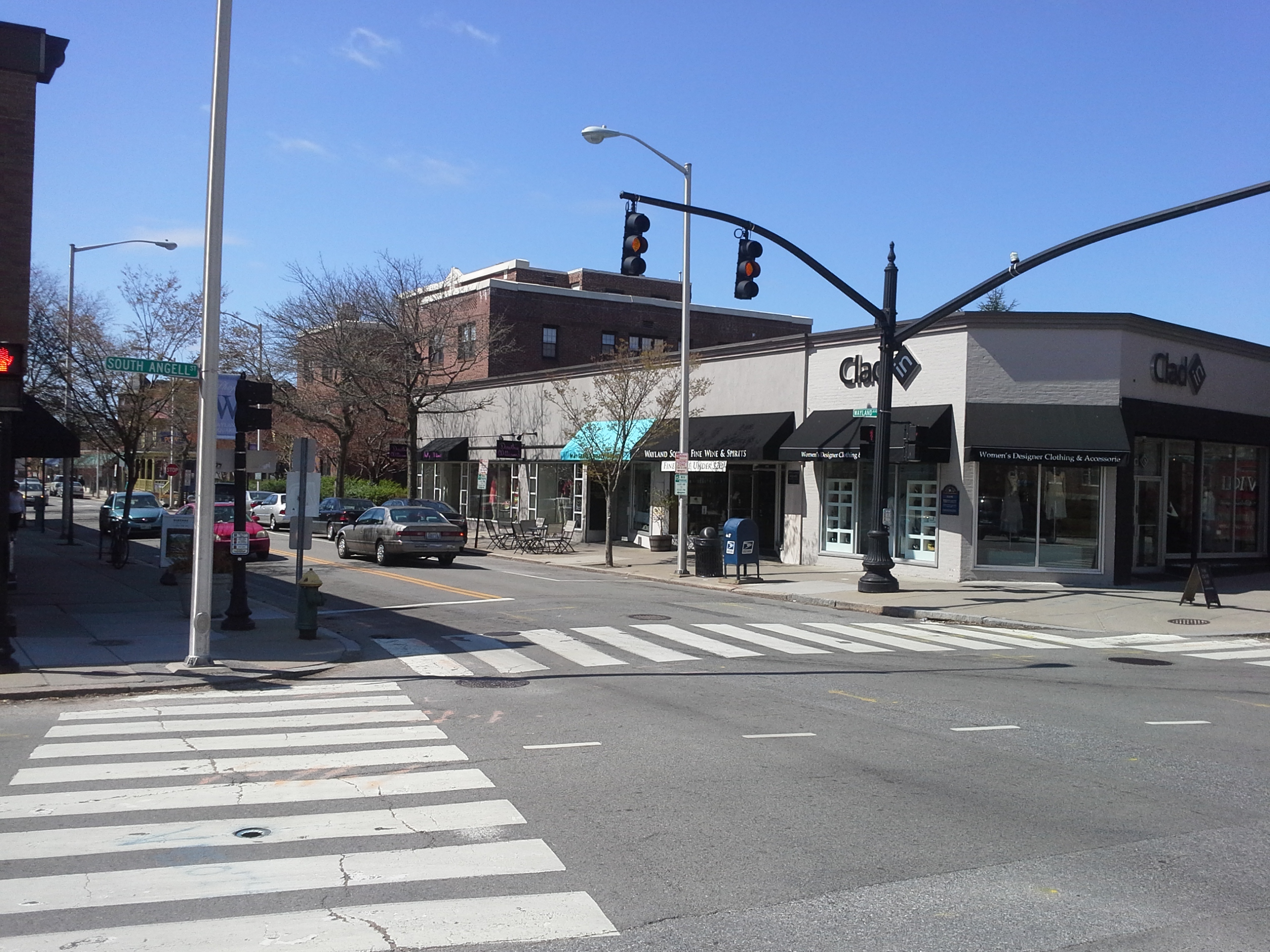
Another view

Wayland Square or simply Wayland is a neighborhood on the East Side of Providence, Rhode Island United States near Brown University and the Rhode Island School of Design.

The neighborhood's boundaries are Lloyd Avenue on the north, Seekonk River on the east, Pitman Street on the south, and Arlington Avenue and Governor Street on the west. It includes the Wayland Historic District, which is listed on the National Register of Historic Places, as well as the Blackstone Park Conservation District. It borders Blackstone, Fox Point, and College Hill neighborhoods.

== History ==
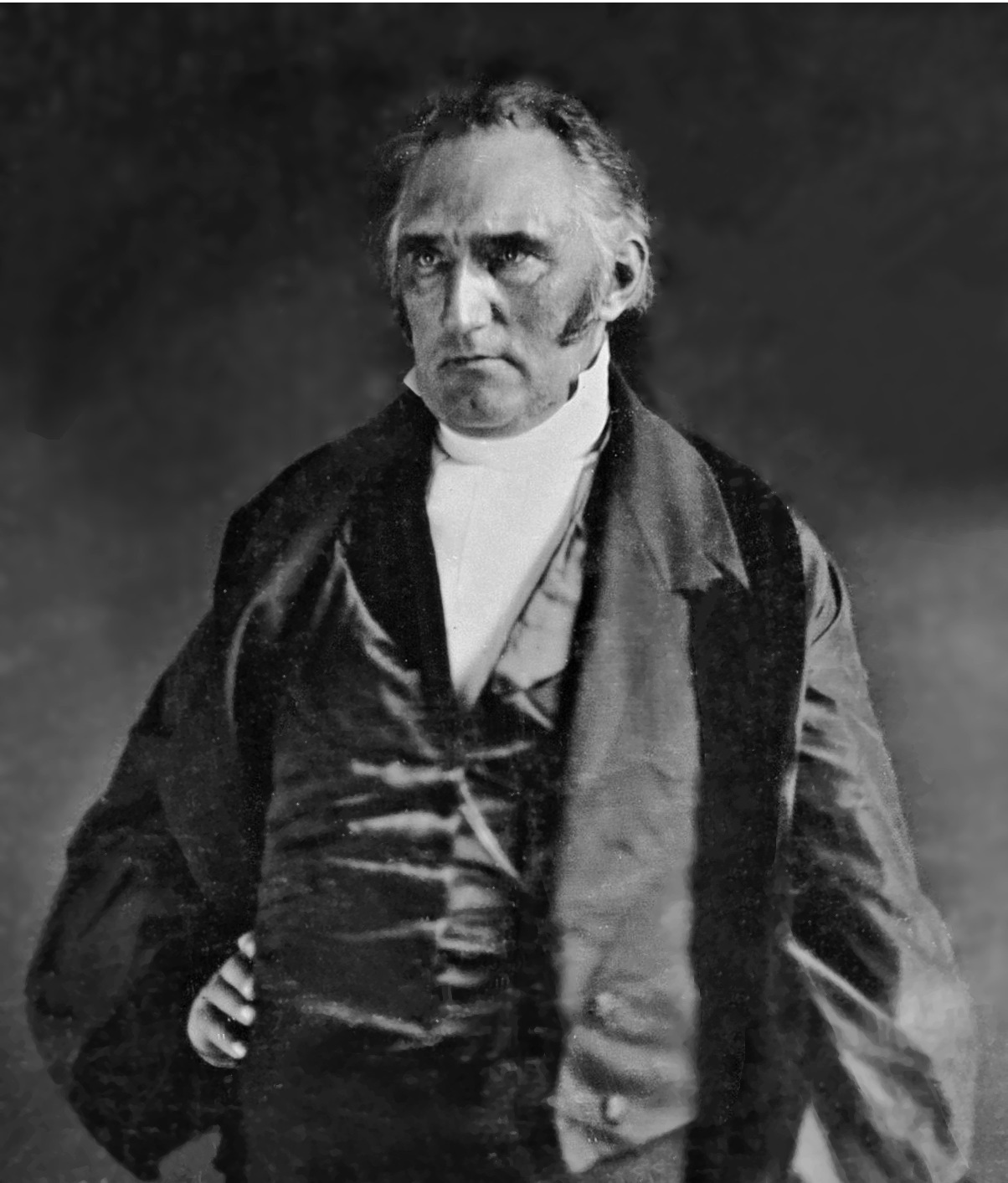
Francis Wayland, President of Brown University

The square and Wayland Avenue are named after Francis Wayland, a Baptist pastor and president of Brown University. Most of the area was developed in the early twentieth century with many Queen Anne style apartment buildings. The area remained largely undeveloped until the twentieth century because of the marshy environment adjacent to the river. Today, the square features numerous businesses, houses of worship, and restaurants. It is also home to the Red Bridge, which crosses the Seekonk River.

== See also ==
- Lincoln School (Providence, Rhode Island)
- Saint Martin's Church, Providence
- Temple Beth-El (Providence, Rhode Island)
- Wayland Historic District
