= Frank J. Fiorenzano =

American politician

Member of the Rhode Island House of Representatives from the 13th district
- In office January 4, 1977 – January 5, 1993
- Preceded by: Joseph A. Bevilacqua
- Succeeded by: Charlene Lima

Personal details
- Born: January 7, 1949 (age 77)
- Party: Democratic
- Spouse: Charlene Lima

Frank J. Fiorenzano (born January 7, 1949) is an American Democratic Party politician who served as a member of the Rhode Island House of Representatives from 1977 to 1993. He did not seek reelection in 1992 after being charged with stealing from clients and was replaced by his wife, Charlene Lima.
