= Joseph DeAngelis =

American politician

219th Speaker of the Rhode Island House of Representatives
- In office 1988–1992
- Preceded by: Matthew Smith
- Succeeded by: John B. Harwood

Member of the Rhode Island House of Representatives
- In office 1974–1992

Personal details
- Born: September 21, 1946 (age 79) Providence, Rhode Island, U.S.
- Party: Democratic
- Children: 2
- Education: Providence College; Suffolk University

Joseph DeAngelis (born September 21, 1946) is an American politician and lawyer in the state of Rhode Island.

DeAngelis was born in Providence in 1946. He earned degrees from Providence College and Suffolk University in Boston (J.D. 1973) before establishing law practices in Smithfield, Rhode Island and later Providence. From 1969 to 1973, he served as an executive assistant to Governor of Rhode Island Frank Licht.

A Democrat, DeAngelis was first elected to the Rhode Island House of Representatives in 1974 to represent Smithfield. Previously serving in the leadership positions as majority whip (1977) and majority leader (1980), DeAngelis was chosen to serve as Speaker of the House from 1988 to 1992. After leaving state politics, he returned to practicing law.
