= Matthew Smith (Rhode Island politician) =

American politician

Matthew J. Smith

218th Speaker of the Rhode Island House of Representatives
- In office 1980–1988
- Preceded by: Edward P. Manning
- Succeeded by: Joseph DeAngelis

Member of the Rhode Island House of Representatives
- In office 1973–1988

Personal details
- Born: Matthew John Smith; July 17, 1941 (age 85) Providence, Rhode Island, U.S.
- Party: Democratic
- Spouse: Claire Crepeau
- Children: 4
- Education: Providence College

Matthew John Smith (born July 17, 1941) is an American politician and lawyer in the state of Rhode Island.

Smith was born in Providence in 1941, the son of Irish immigrants. He earned a bachelor's (1962) and master's (1966) degrees at Providence College. He worked as a professor and archivist at Providence College, and also co-authored a book on the history of Catholicism in Rhode Island.

A Democrat, Smith was first elected to the Rhode Island House of Representatives in a special election held in June 1973. He served as Speaker of the House from 1980 to 1988, resigning his seat in 1988 upon being appointed as Clerk of the Rhode Island Supreme Court and Rhode Island court administrator. In addition, Smith was a member of the boards of the St. Joseph Hospital Corporation and Blue Shield of Rhode Island. He is married to Claire Crepeau and has four children.
