= William O'Brien (Rhode Island politician) =

Member of the Rhode Island House of Representatives

Member of the Rhode Island House of Representatives from the 54th district
- Incumbent
- Assumed office January 1, 2013
- Preceded by: Gregory Schadone

Personal details
- Born: July 27, 1969 (age 57)
- Party: Democratic
- Education: Florida International University; Providence College; University of Rhode Island; Rhode Island College
- Website: williamobrienforri.com

William W. O'Brien (born July 27, 1969) is an American politician and a Democratic member of the Rhode Island House of Representatives representing District 54 since January 1, 2013.

== Education ==
O'Brien attended Florida International University, Providence College, the University of Rhode Island, and earned his BS in mathematics from Rhode Island College.

== Elections ==
- 2012 When District 54 Democratic Representative Gregory Schadone retired and left the seat open, O'Brien ran in the three-way September 11, 2012 Democratic Primary, winning with 868 votes (40.4%) and won the November 6, 2012 General election with 3,356 votes (55.7%) against Independent candidate Kenneth Amoriggi.
- 2010 O'Brien initially challenged District 54 Democratic Representative Schadone in the September 23, 2010 Democratic Primary, but lost to Representative Schadone, who won re-election in the November 2, 2010 General election against Independent candidate Lance Mantia.
