= Fox Point, Providence, Rhode Island =

Coordinates: 41.8191°N 71.3980°W

Fox Point
- Neighborhood
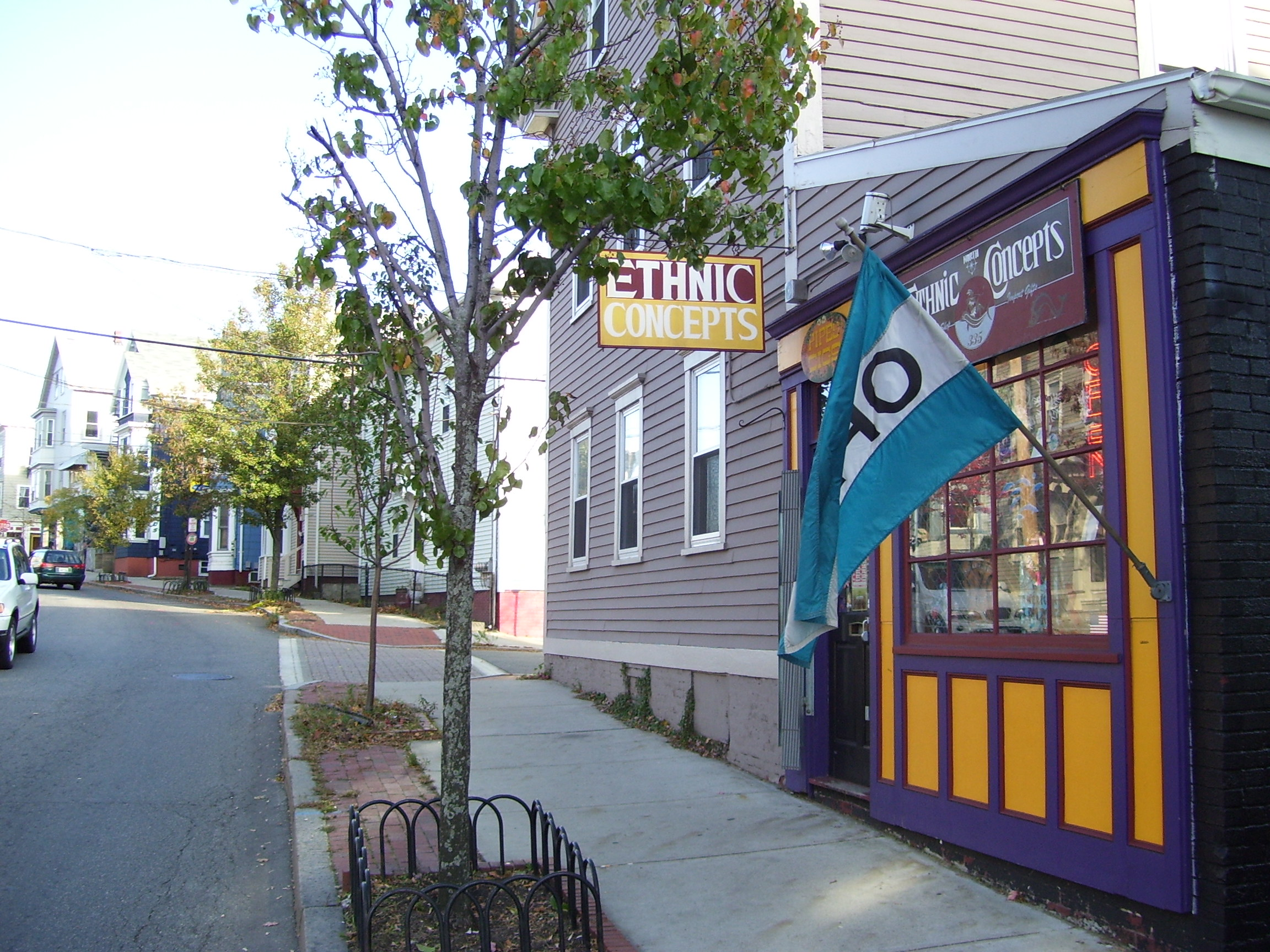
- Wickenden Street

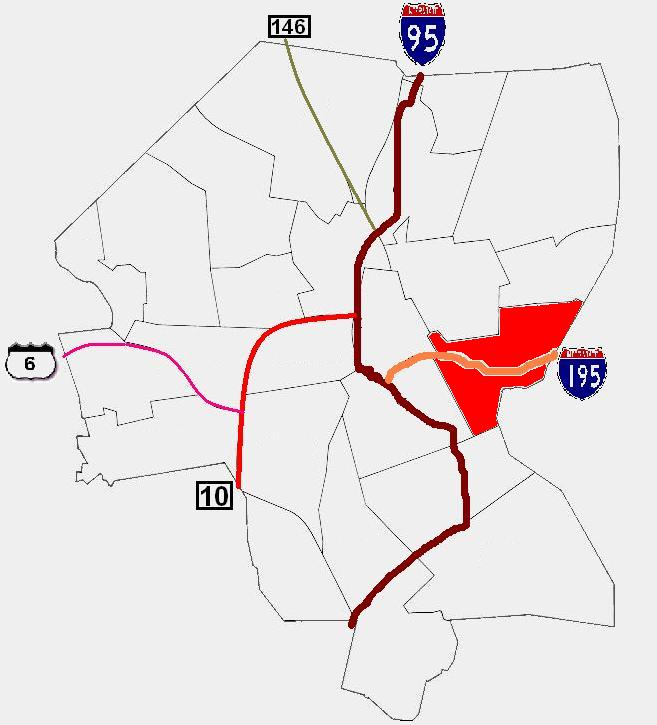
- Location of Fox Point within Providence
- Country: United States
- State: Rhode Island
- City: Providence

Fox Point is a neighborhood in the East Side of Providence, Rhode Island. It is bounded by the Providence and Seekonk rivers, Interstate 195 and the College Hill and Wayland neighborhoods. Fox Point is the southernmost neighborhood in the East Side area of Providence.

Fox Point retains much of its historical character, with housing stock dating from the 18th and 19th centuries in much of the neighborhood. Vernacular interpretations of the Federal, Greek Revival, and Italianate architectural styles are well represented West of Governor Street, while somewhat more recent construction dominates on Ives and Gano Streets.

== History ==
Fox Point was originally used for farmland, but its economy quickly changed to maritime affairs with the construction of Providence's first port at India Point in 1680, becoming a major trading point in the Atlantic Triangular Trade of slaves, sugar cane, and rum between New England, the West Indies, and West Africa.

The neighborhood derives its name from Tockwotten Hill, which was largely leveled (along with slum residences) as part of a public works project in the 19th century. The fill was used to reclaim part of the Seekonk River now consisting of Gano Street and land to the east of Gano Street. Once the area's street grid had been laid, Fox Point developed as a residential neighborhood.

However, Fox Point became an attractive location for industry with the completion of the Boston and Providence Railroad and regular steamship connections to ports along the East Coast. The new industry, in turn, attracted many immigrants. Irish were the first wave, and the neighborhood became home to increasing numbers of Portuguese and Cape Verdeans by the second half of the 19th century.

During much of the 20th Century, Fox Point was a neighborhood made up of immigrants from Cape Verde, Portugal, Ireland, Lebanon, and more. Grocery stores, community centers, and restaurants dotted the neighborhood. By the 1980s, those residents and businesses were displaced by gentrification, resulting from urban renewal and the encroachment of students from nearby Brown University living off-campus.

== Demographics ==
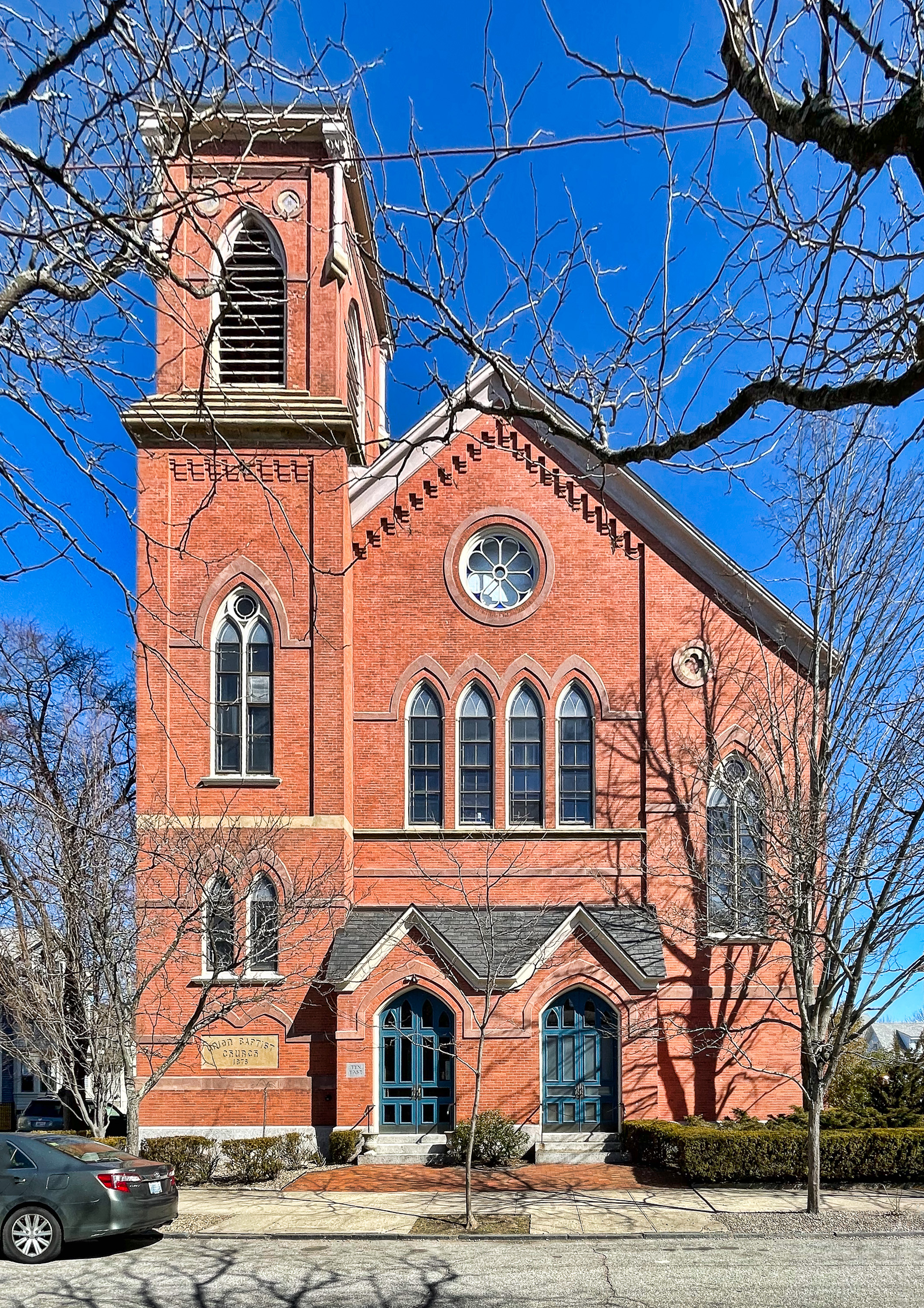
Union Baptist Church, on East Street

For census purposes, the Census Bureau classifies Fox Point as part of the Census Tract 37. This neighborhood had 3,876 inhabitants based on data from the 2020 United States Census.

The racial makeup of the neighborhood was 71% (2,750) White (Non-Hispanic), 2.3% (90) Black (Non-Hispanic), 14.8% (574) Asian, 3.4% (132) from some other race or from two or more races. Hispanic or Latino of any race were 8.5% (330) of the population. 22.9% are foreign born, with most foreign born residents originating from Asia (58%).

The median age in this area is 29.2 years old. Family Households made up 23% of the population, and the average household (family and non-family) had 2.1 persons living there. 19% of the population was married. Out of the 2,170 vacant and non-vacant housing units, 36% were owner occupied, and 64% renter occupied. The average house was worth $386,500, which is significantly higher than the average in Providence. 21.7% of residents are below the poverty line.

== Government ==
Fox Point is located within Ward One. Ward One is currently represented in the Providence City Council by Democrat John Goncalves.

== Parks ==
Parks

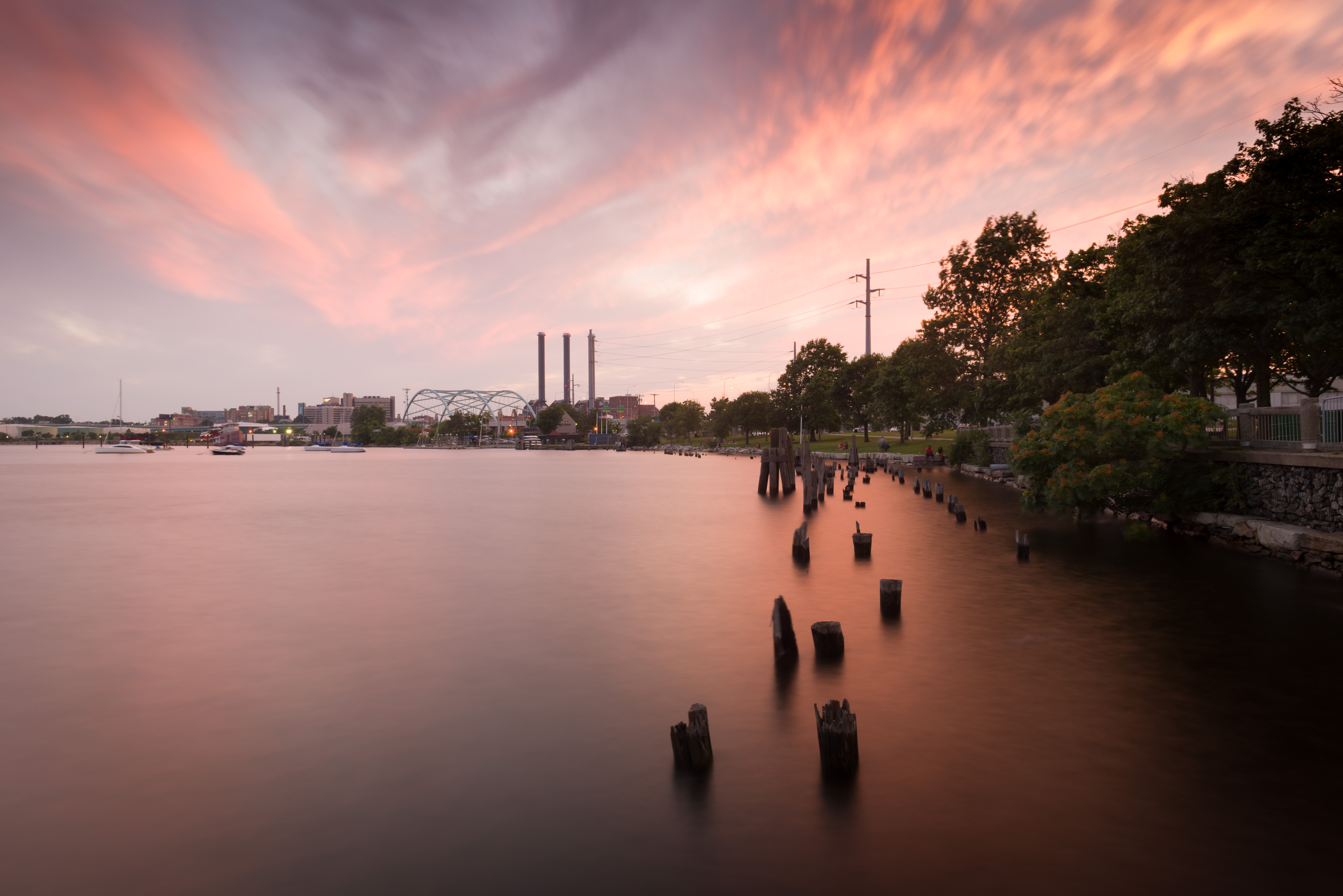
India Point Park

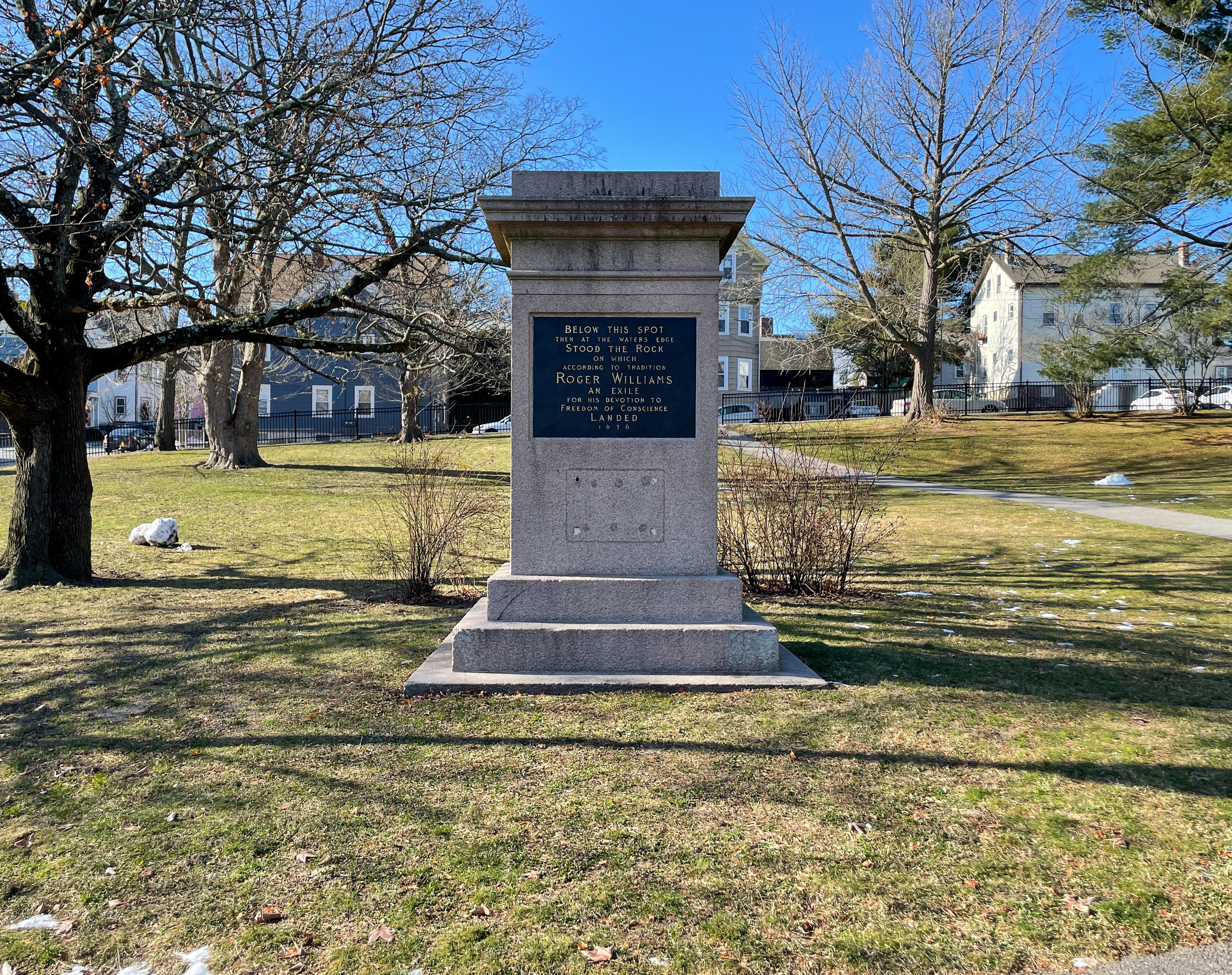
Slate Rock memorial in Roger Williams Square

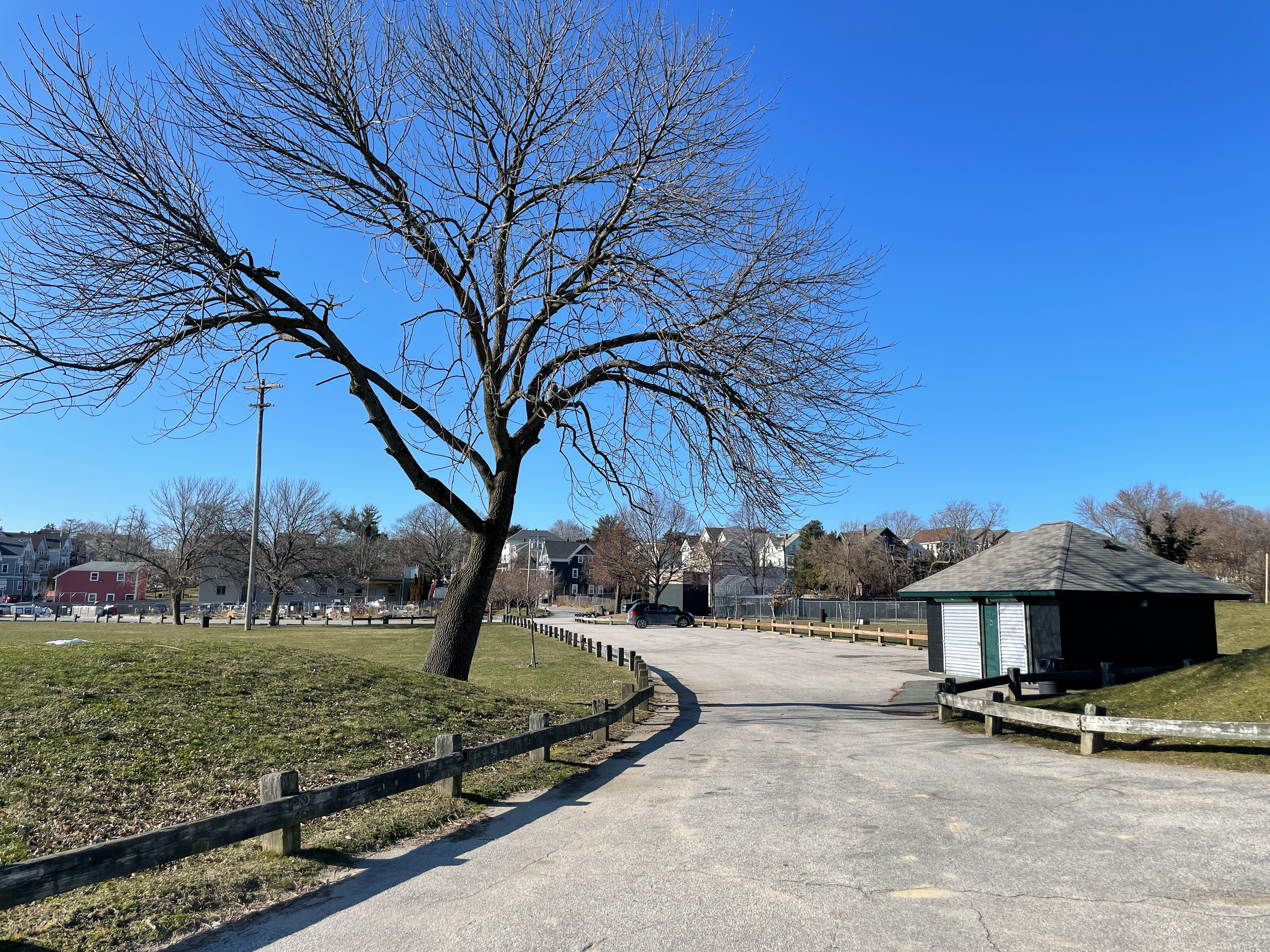
Gano Park

=== India Point Park ===
India Point Park is located along the northern shore of Narragansett Bay, at Green Jacket Shoal and the confluence of the Seekonk and the Providence River. The park is the only large expanse of Bay-side shoreline in Providence preserved for public use. Friends of India Point Park is a local citizens organization interested in maintaining the park.

=== Roger Williams Square and Slate Rock Park ===
A prominent boulder on the west shore of the Seekonk River (near the current Gano Park) was once one of Providence's most important historic landmarks. Slate Rock was said to be the spot where a group of Narragansetts first welcomed the exiled Roger Williams in 1636 with the famous phrase "What cheer, netop?", and directed him to his eventual settlement location at the fork of the Woonasquatucket and Moshassuck Rivers. The historic rock was accidentally blown up by city workers in 1877. They were attempting to expose a buried portion of the stone, but used too much dynamite and the stone was "blasted to pieces." Pieces of the stone were later sold for souvenirs. A monument in Slate Rock Park at Roger Williams Square commemorates the site.

=== Gano Street Park ===
Gano Street Park along the Seekonk River has numerous athletic fields and a dog park.

== Schools ==
The Fox Point area includes two schools. One of these is the French-American School, a private school teaching in both French and English from kindergarten to eighth grade. It is located at 75 John Street, near the intersection of John and Hope Street. The other school in Fox Point is the Vartan Gregorian Elementary School, located at 455 Wickenden Street near the Fox Point Boys and Girls Club. It is part of the Providence public school system and teaches students from kindergarten to fifth grade.

== Notable residents ==
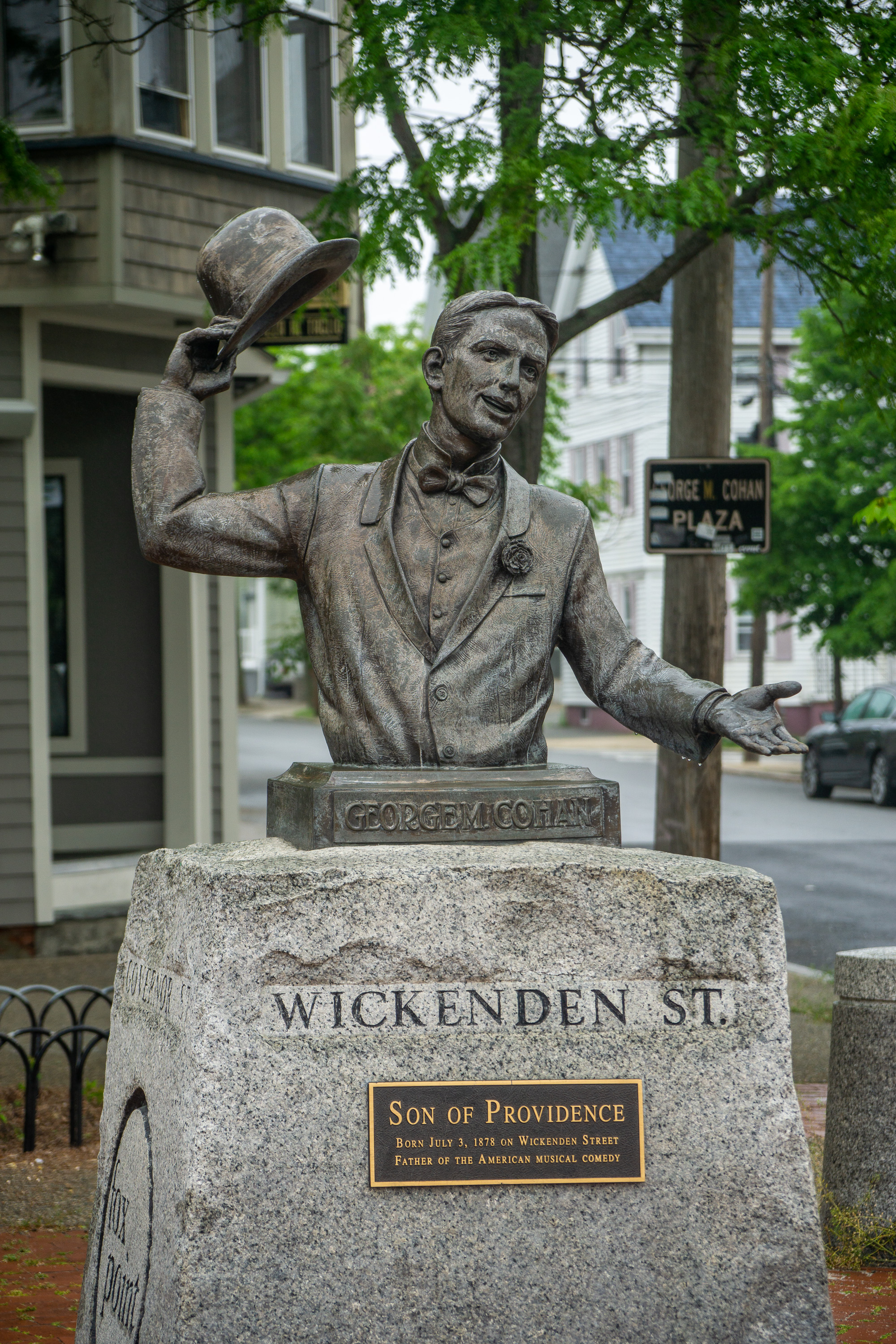
Statue commemorating George M. Cohan

- George M. Cohan, the noted American actor, singer, dancer, composer, playwright, and producer, was born on Wickenden Street. George M. Cohan Boulevard is named in his honor.
