= Charlene Lima =

American politician

Member of the Rhode Island House of Representatives
- Incumbent
- Assumed office January 5, 1993
- Preceded by: Frank J. Fiorenzano
- Constituency: 13th district (1993‍–‍2003); 14th district (since 2003)

Deputy Speaker of the Rhode Island House of Representatives
- In office January 2010 – December 2022
- Speaker: William Murphy; Gordon Fox; Nicholas Mattiello; Joe Shekarchi
- Succeeded by: Raymond Hull

Personal details
- Born: August 18, 1953 (age 72)
- Party: Democratic
- Spouse: Frank J. Fiorenzano
- Education: University of Rhode Island (BA)
- Occupation: Educator; politician

Charlene M. Lima (born August 18, 1953) is an American politician who has served as a Democratic member of the Rhode Island House of Representatives since 1993, first representing the 13th district (later the 14th district after redistricting). During the 2009-2010 sessions, she served on the House Committees on Corporations, Separation of Powers, and Oversight. She also served as Chairperson of the Special House Commission to examine the issue of licensing of builders and contractors. Lima served as the Deputy Speaker of the House from 2010-2022. Outside of politics, she was a teacher for the Providence Public School District.
