= Wickenden Street =

Street in Providence, Rhode Island, USA

Coordinates: 41.81960°N 71.39621°W

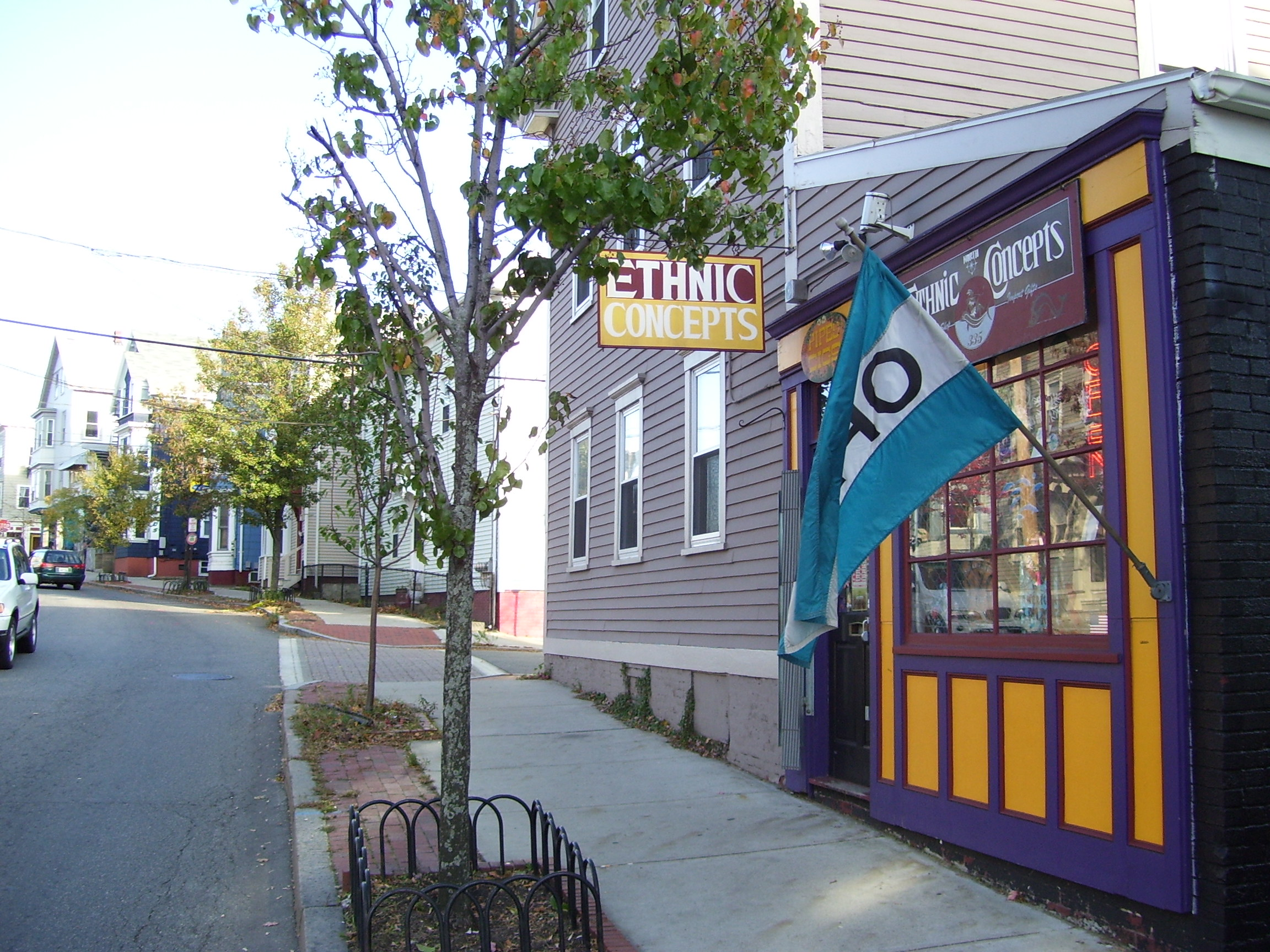
Wickenden Street in 2008

Original settlement plots on the East Side of Providence in 1650. Wickenden's strip of farmland (now Wickenden Street) is highlighted. Wickenden Street and other East Side streets received their names after the names of the original plot owner, (e.g. Arnold, Williams, Angell, Waterman)

Wickenden Street in Fox Point, Providence, Rhode Island is a popular destination for students of the area's colleges and schools. The street is surrounded by schools and universities on the East Side of Providence's College Hill, including Brown University, RISD, Moses Brown School, & The Wheeler School.

== History ==
The street is named after a rebellious British minister, William Wickenden, who had a farm on the original strip of land comprising modern day Wickenden Street. Wickenden was one of the first settlers in Providence in the 17th century. The area was home to a large Portuguese-American community starting in the 19th century. In 1885 Bishop Hendricken organized one of the first Portuguese-American churches in the area on the site of a former Wickenden Street skating rink. Some of the houses on the Street are still painted in pastel colors in the Portuguese style.

Today, Wickenden Street has numerous independent shops, art galleries, a farmer's market, and restaurants that are popular among local artists, professors and students.

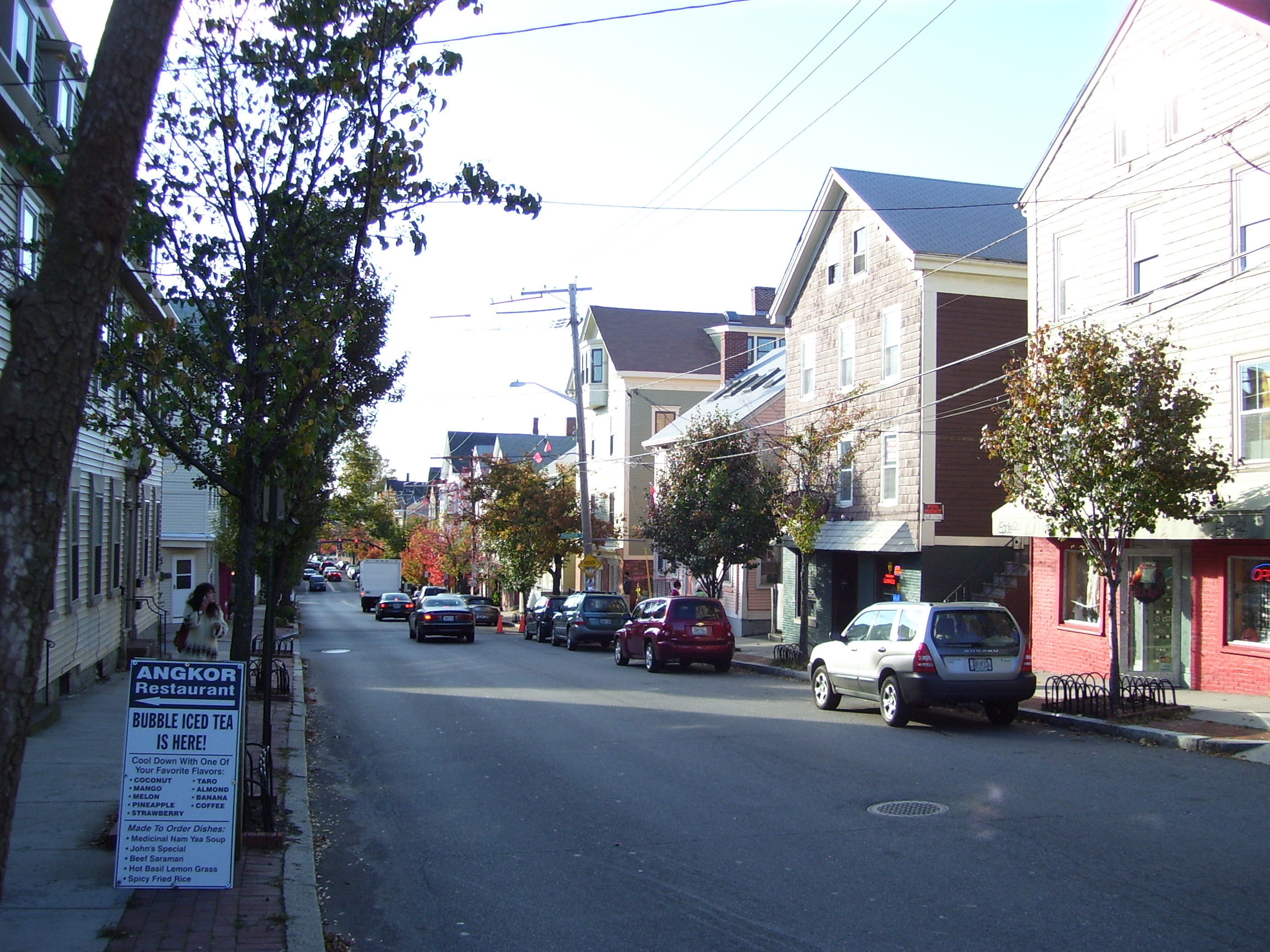
Wickenden Street in 2008

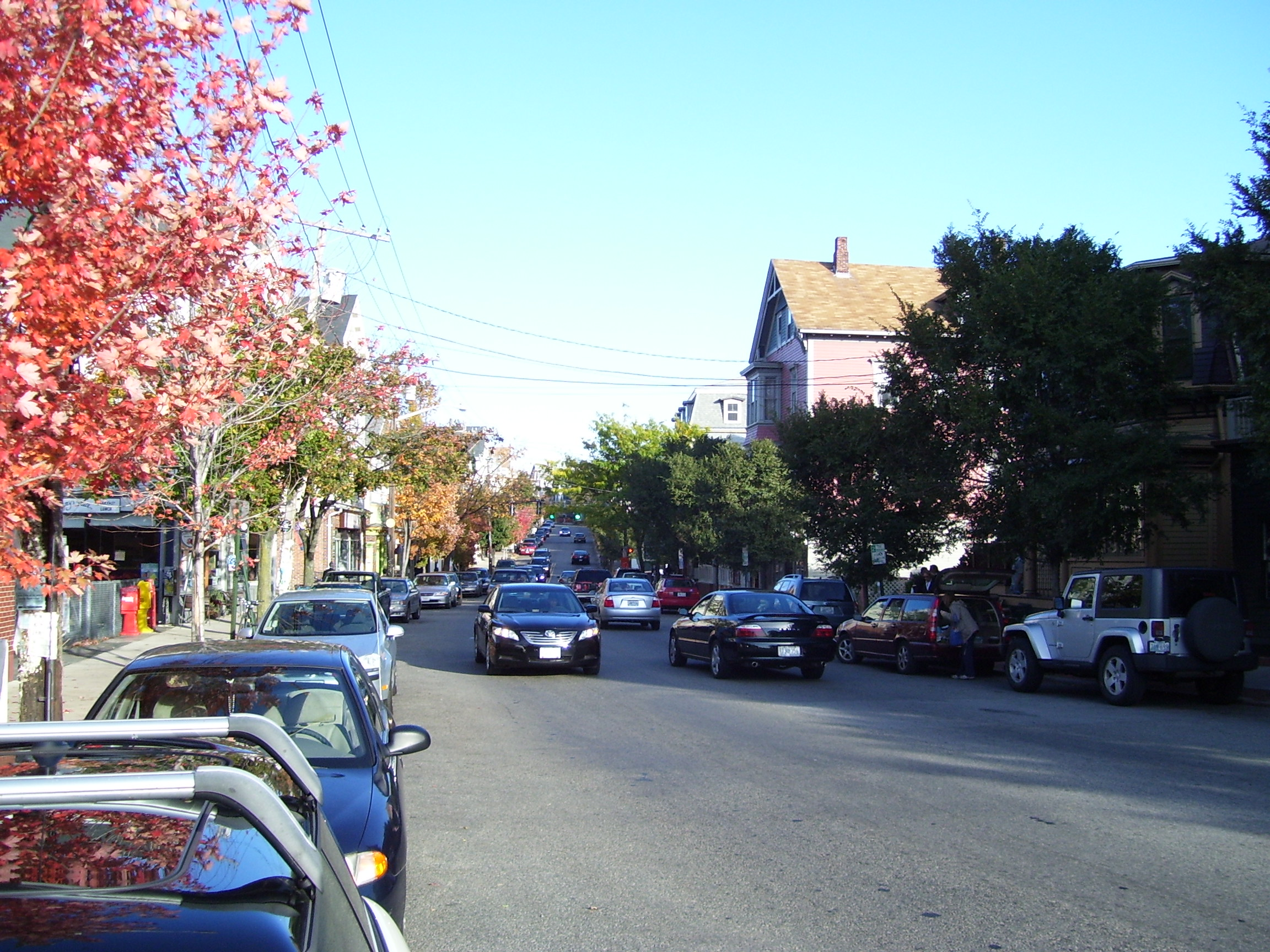
Wickenden Street in 2008

== See also ==
- College Hill, Providence, Rhode Island
- Thayer Street
