= East Side, Providence, Rhode Island =

Collection of neighborhoods

Coordinates: 41.842°N 71.397°W

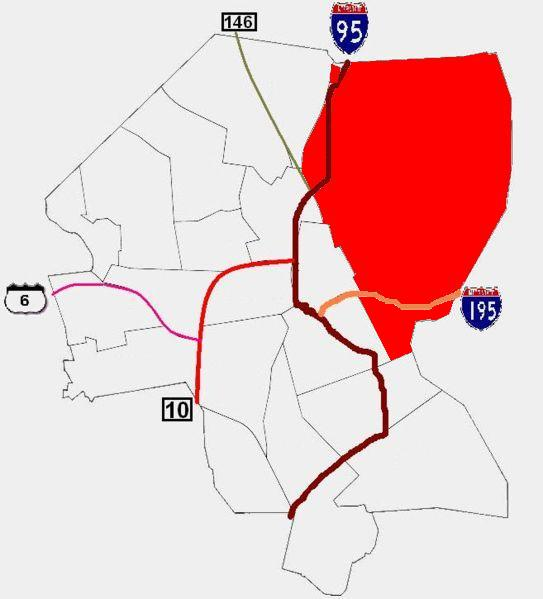
Providence neighborhoods with the East Side in red

The East Side is a collection of neighborhoods in the eastern part of the city of Providence, Rhode Island. It officially comprises the neighborhoods of Blackstone, Hope (commonly known as Summit), Mount Hope, College Hill, Wayland, and Fox Point.

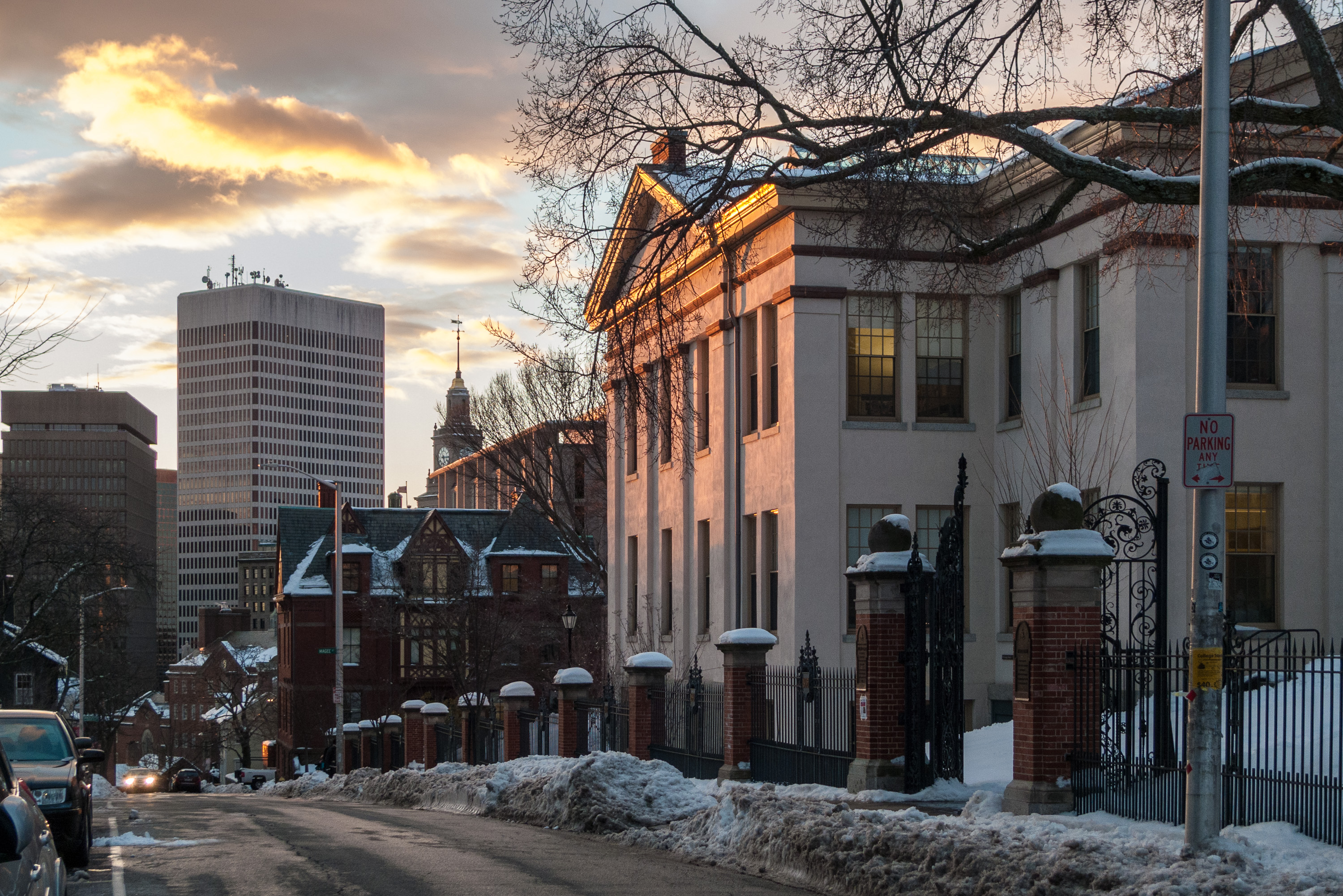
View of skyscrapers in Downtown Providence from College Hill

The area is separated from East Providence, Rhode Island, to the east by the Seekonk River. To the west it is separated from the rest of Providence by the Providence River and Interstate 95. To the north, it borders Pawtucket, Rhode Island. To the south, it abuts Narragansett Bay, which is formed by the confluence of the Seekonk and Providence Rivers.

Roger Williams founded Providence along College Hill. This area thus includes some of the oldest sections of the city. The spot where Williams landed after crossing the Seekonk River is marked by a small park in Fox Point.

== Universities and schools ==
The East Side contains most of Brown University's academic and athletic facilities. These include the Main Green, the Rockefeller Library, the Erickson Athletic Complex, the Pembroke Campus, and the Watson Institute for International and Public Affairs. Many of the Rhode Island School of Design's buildings are along the slope of College Hill. The RISD Museum is located on Benefit Street.

Private schools include the Moses Brown School, the Wheeler School, Lincoln School, School One, Providence Hebrew Day School, and the French-American School.

Hope High School is located at the corner of Hope and Olney Streets. It is one of Providence's public high schools.

== Restaurants and shopping ==
Original 1650 settlement plots on the East Side.

Numerous cafes, restaurants, and shops are located along Thayer Street, adjoining Brown University at Veteran's Gate, and along Wickenden Street, South Water Street. Both streets are home to numerous small and independent shops, though Thayer Street has a few chain stores. Brown University's bookstore is located on Thayer. A notable Thayer Street landmark is the Avon Cinema which dates back to the early twentieth century.

Wayland Square is another shopping area, located at the intersection of Wayland Ave. and Angell St.

== Parks ==
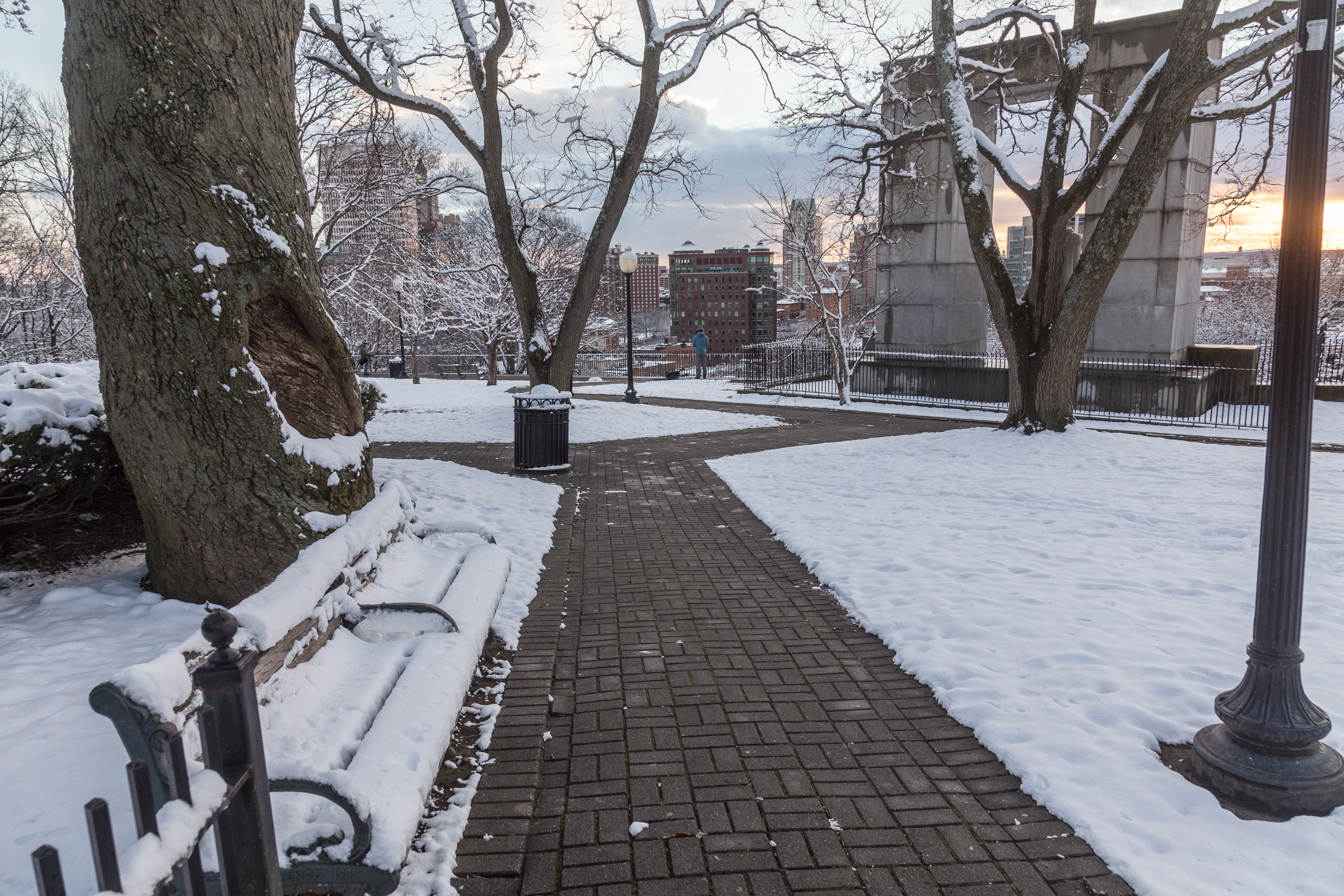
Prospect Terrace Park, College Hill

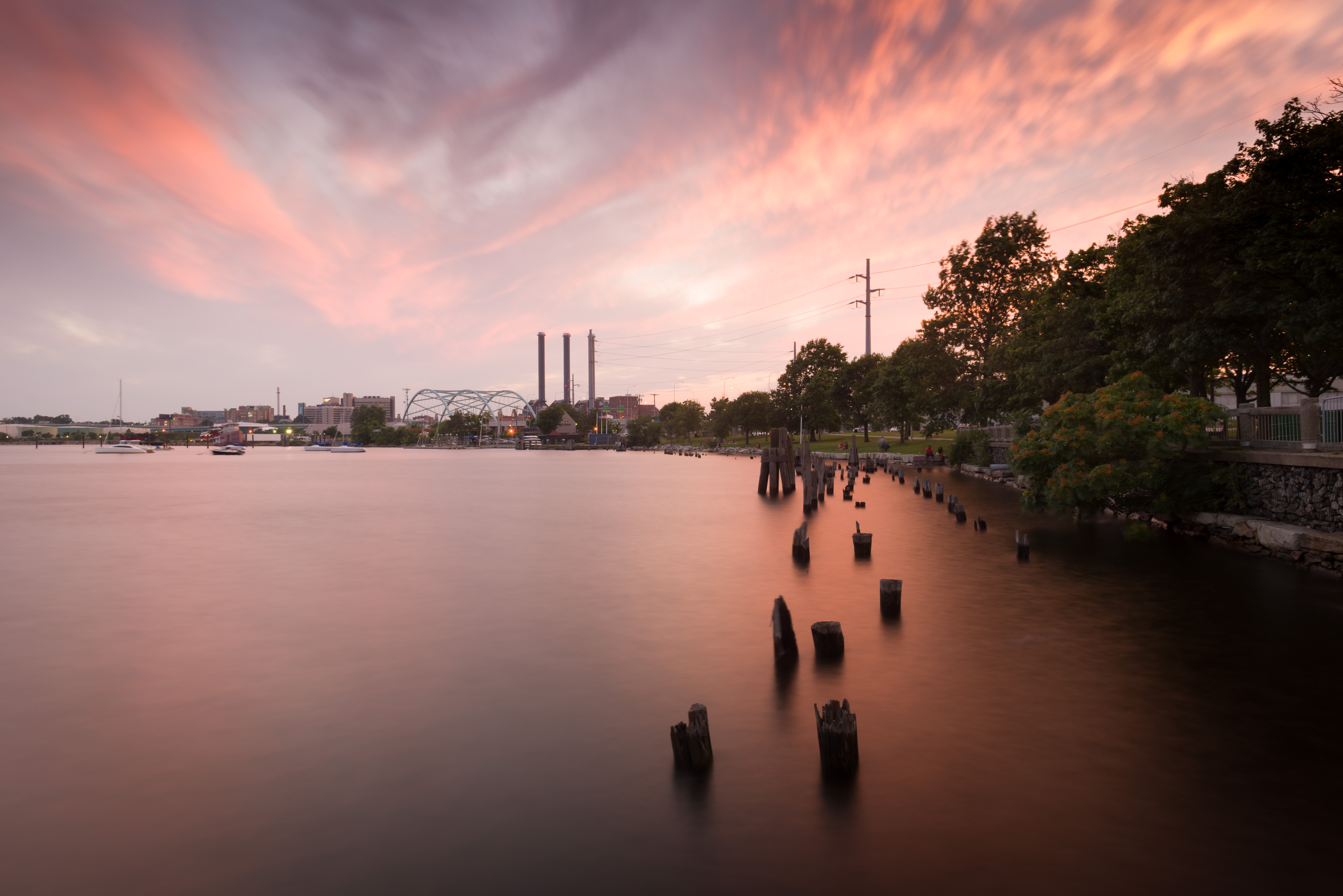
India Point Park, Fox Point

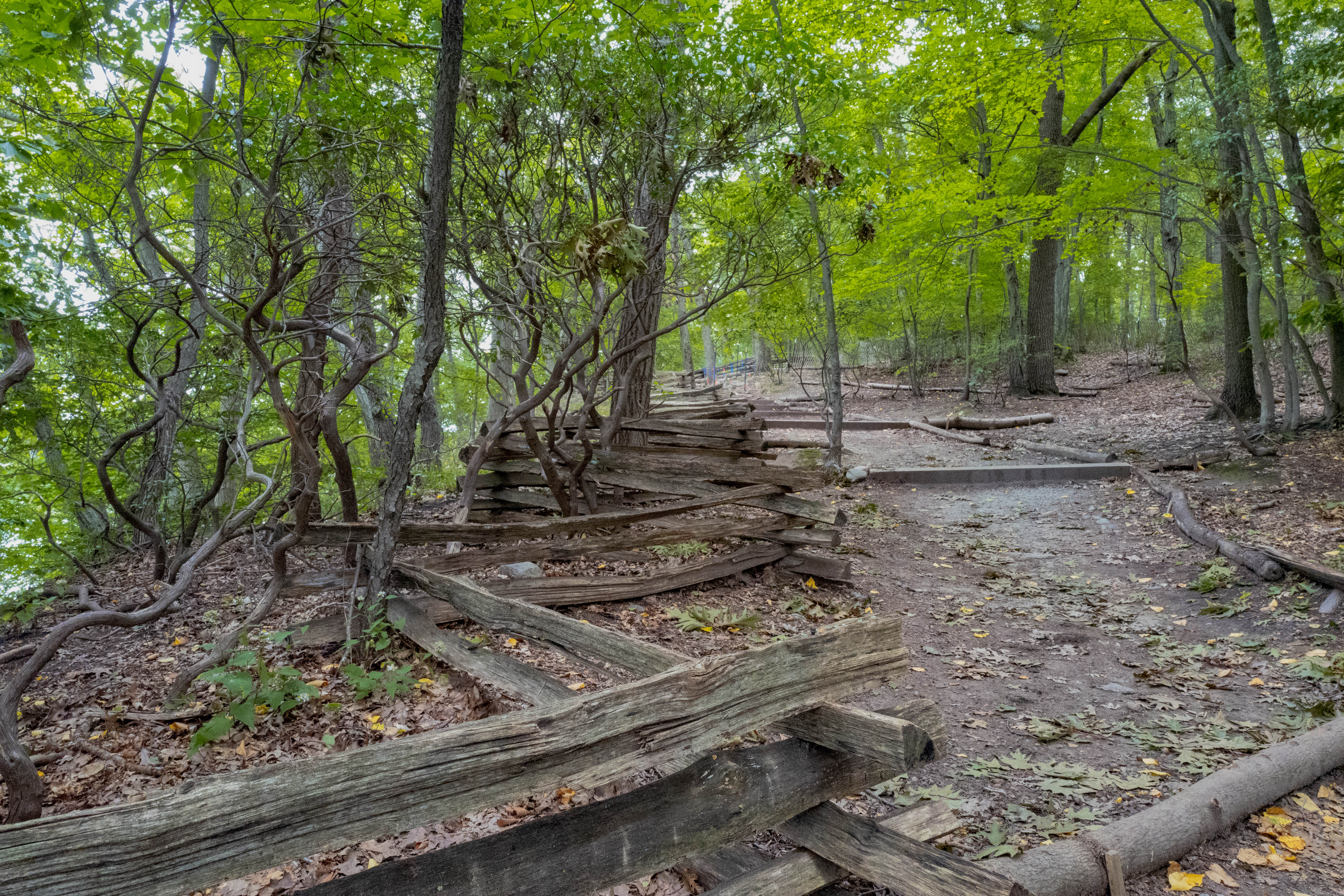
Blackstone Park

The East Side contains numerous parks and green spaces. India Point Park, the largest of these, is located along the northernmost shore of Narragansett Bay. It is the only large expanse of Bay-side shoreline in Providence reserved for public use.

Interstate 195 separates the park from the rest of Fox Point. The relocation and reconstruction of Interstate 195 included a new, landscaped pedestrian bridge connecting Fox Point to India Point Park.

Other parks include:

- Blackstone Boulevard Park is a green space between northbound and southbound lanes of Blackstone Boulevard. It consists of 19.3 acres (7.8 ha) of parkland and a 1.7-mile (2.7 km) path for jogging and walking.
- Blackstone Park just north of Richmond Square at the end of Waterman Street in Wayland. Blackstone Park is 40-acre (16 ha) city park with 2,400 feet (730 m) of shore frontage on the Seekonk River.
- Brown Street Park, behind Hope High School. Brown Street Park has several children's play structures and an adult fitness equipment area, ongoing programming includes Children's Play Dates, Fitness Classes, Yoga Classes and a Summer Concert Series.
- Constance Witherby Park in Wayland.
- Gano Street Park, along the Seekonk River, has numerous athletic fields and a dog-park. The area is also known as Engineer's Field.
- Lippitt Memorial Park, a 6-acre (2.4 ha) park at the intersection of Hope Street and Blackstone Boulevard near the Pawtucket border. It is named after former Rhode Island governor Charles W. Lippitt.
- Market Square, a small park on the edge of Downtown.
- Mary Sharpe Park, a small park between Benefit and Pratt Avenue.
- Paterson Park, a small park in Wayland adjacent to Blackstone Park.
- Gladys Potter Park is a small park in Wayland at the corner of Elton St. and Humboldt Ave.
- Prospect Terrace Park on top of College Hill.
- Roger William's Landing in Fox Point.
- Roger Williams National Memorial at the bottom of College Hill.
- Riverwalk located along the Providence River, where part of WaterFire is held.
- Veterans' Memorial Park, on the edge of Downtown, is home to a war memorial.

== Demographics ==
Mostly residential, the East Side is the most affluent part of the city with higher property values, lower unemployment, and higher income levels than the city as a whole. Approximately 20% of the city's 190,934 people live on the East Side. Mount Hope and the area along Elmgrove Avenue have historically had a large community of Russian Jews.

== Government ==
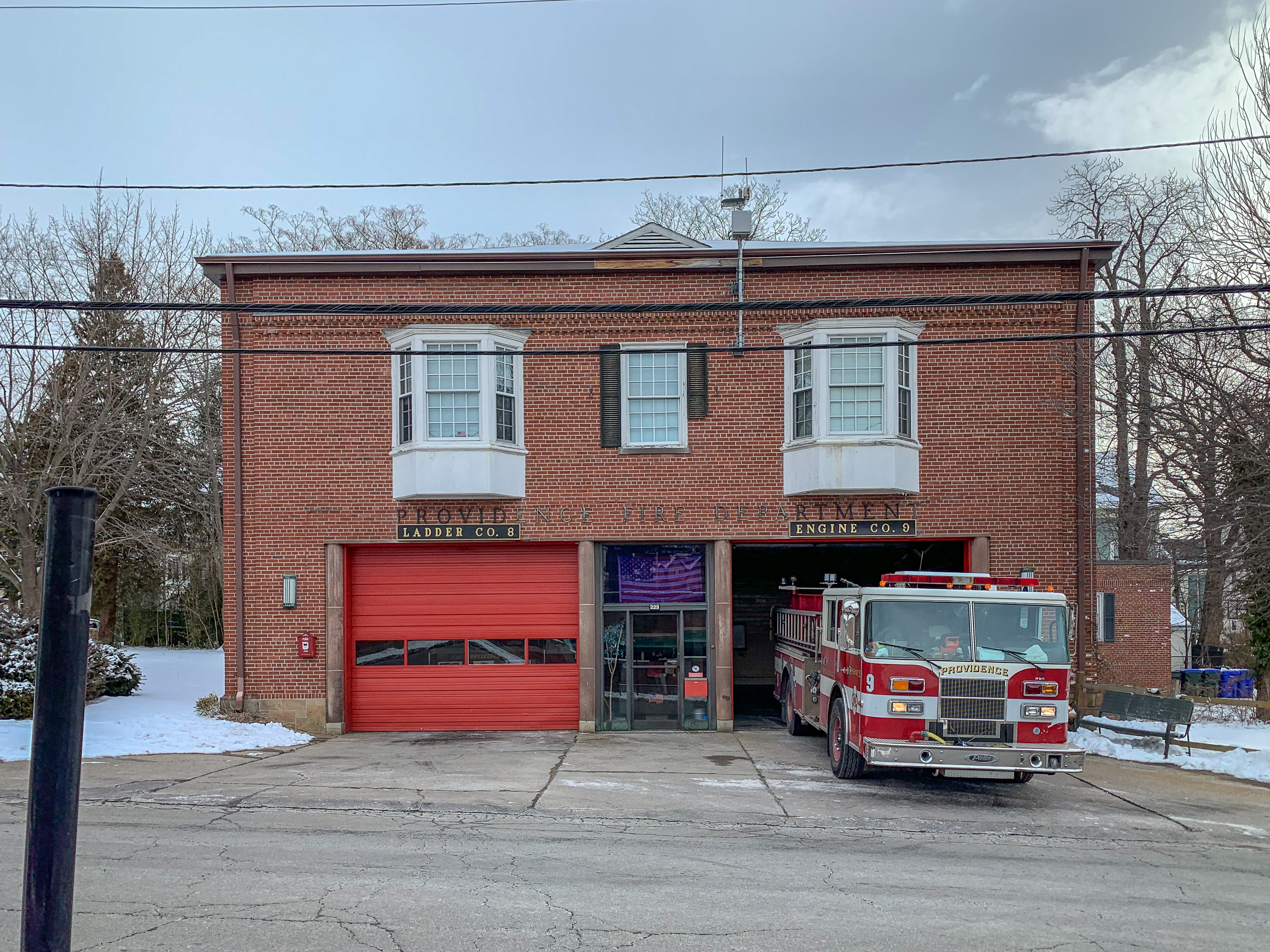
Ladder Co. 8 and Engine Co. 9 on Brook Street

Three of the fifteen Providence City Council wards are located on the East Side. Ward One includes all of Fox Point and parts of College Hill and Wayland south of Angell St. Ward Two encompasses the remainder of College Hill and Wayland, most of Blackstone, and parts of Mount Hope. Ward Three includes Hope (Summit) and most of Mount Hope.

Major public buildings include the Rhode Island Supreme Court on Benefit Street and the RI Office of the Attorney General on South Main Street.

== Hospitals ==
Miriam Hospital, a private, non-profit hospital, is located along Summit Avenue in the Hope (Summit) area. Local Jewish organizations founded the hospital in 1926.

Butler Hospital, located off Blackstone Boulevard, is Rhode Island's only private mental health hospital. Founded in 1844, the hospital offers psychiatric and substance-abuse treatment programs.

== Landmarks ==
The East Side contains the oldest section of the city. The Providence Preservation Society and the Rhode Island Historical Society have preserved numerous historic buildings, especially in the College Hill area. Historic landmarks include:

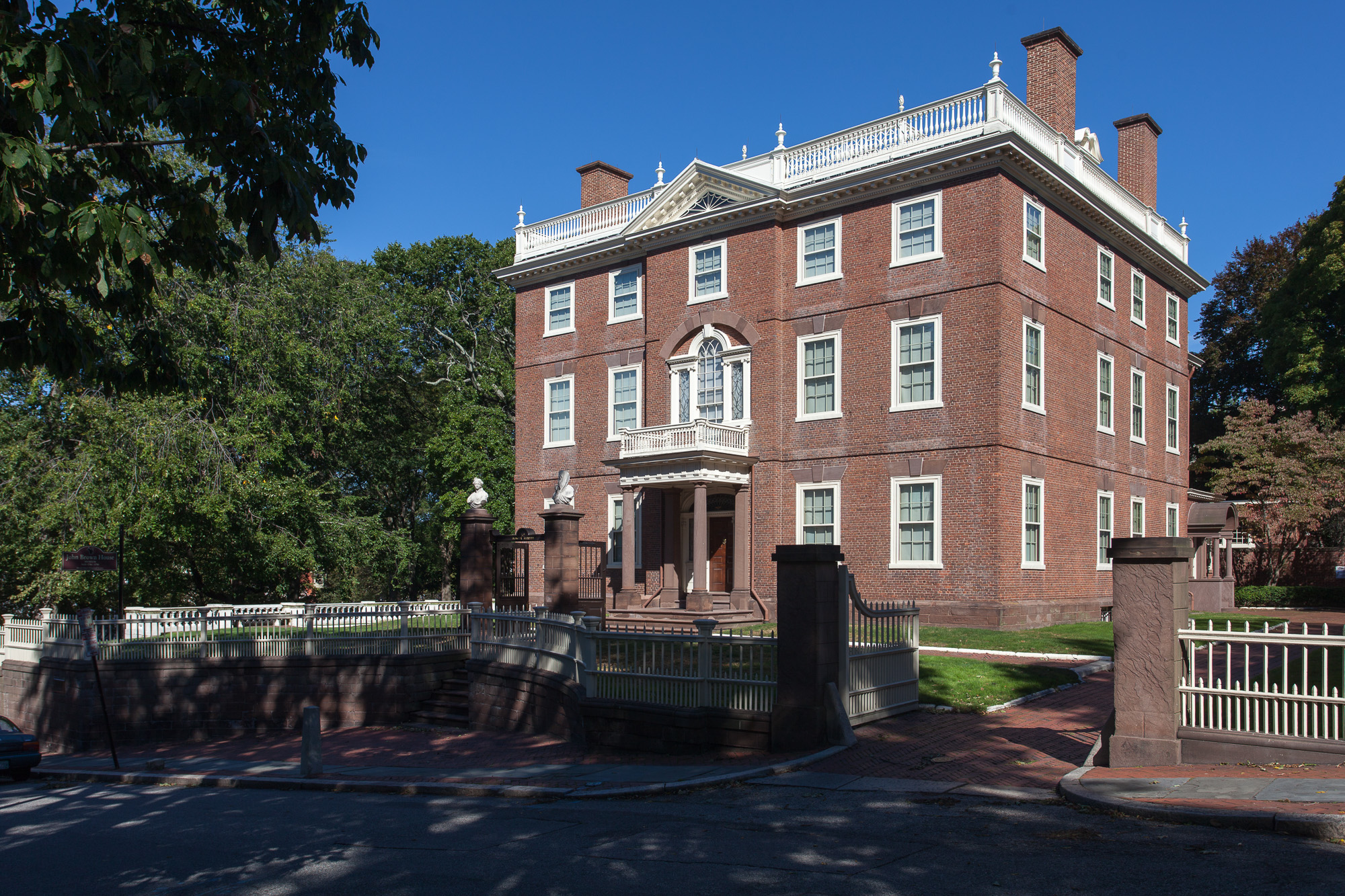
John Brown House (1786) is one of many 18th and 19th century structures on the East Side.

- The Providence Athenaeum: The fourth oldest library in America, located on Benefit Street.
- The Central Congregational Church, An 1893 Carrère and Hastings-designed church on Angell Street.
- The First Baptist Church in America: The oldest Baptist church in the United States, founded by Roger Williams in 1638. It is located on North Main Street.
- The First Christian Science Church: A domed church on Meeting Street.
- The John Brown House: The home of John Brown (1736–1803), a china trader, slave trader, and Federalist, his family financed the establishment of Brown University. His house is located at the corner of Benefit and Power Street.
- The Marine Armory: An armory in service during the American Civil War, it was the first headquarters of the Rhode Island State Police.
- The Old State House: The former statehouse of Rhode Island.
- H.P. Lovecraft Memorial Square
