= William J. Murphy (Rhode Island politician) =

American politician

Bill Murphy

221st Speaker of the Rhode Island House of Representatives
- In office January 7, 2003 – February 11, 2010
- Deputy: Charlene Lima
- Preceded by: John B. Harwood
- Succeeded by: Gordon Fox

Member of the Rhode Island House of Representatives from the 26th district
- In office January 5, 1993 – January 2011
- Succeeded by: Patricia Morgan

Personal details
- Born: William John Murphy; January 4, 1963 (age 63) West Warwick, Rhode Island
- Party: Democratic
- Spouse: Stacey L. Judge
- Education: University of Hartford (BA), Franklin Pierce Law Center (JD)
- Profession: Attorney, Lobbyist

William John Murphy (born January 4, 1963) is an American attorney and was a Democratic member of the Rhode Island House of Representatives, representing the 26th District from 1993 to 2011. He served as the 221st Speaker of the House from January 7, 2003, to February 11, 2010, when he handed over the gavel to his majority leader, Gordon D. Fox.

== Education ==
He graduated from the University of Hartford with a Bachelor of Arts in Politics and Government in 1985 and from the University of New Hampshire School of Law with a Juris Doctor in 1989.

== Legal career ==
He has practiced law in Providence, Rhode Island with his own law firm Murphy & Fay, LLP.

== Political career ==
He served in the Rhode Island House of Representatives representing the 26th District from 1993 to 2011. While in this position he served as Vice Chairman of the House Judiciary Committee and later Speaker of the House.

He later registered as a lobbyist and has lobbied in both the Rhode Island General Assembly and the Office of the Governor of Rhode Island for groups such as Twin Rivers Casino, the Rhode Island Brotherhood of Correctional Officers and Advance America Cash Advance Centers.

== Personal life ==
He married his wife Stacey on March 26, 1994, at Sacred Heart Church in West Warwick, Rhode Island. They later had two children.
