= Prospect Terrace Park =

Park in Providence, Rhode Island, opened 1869

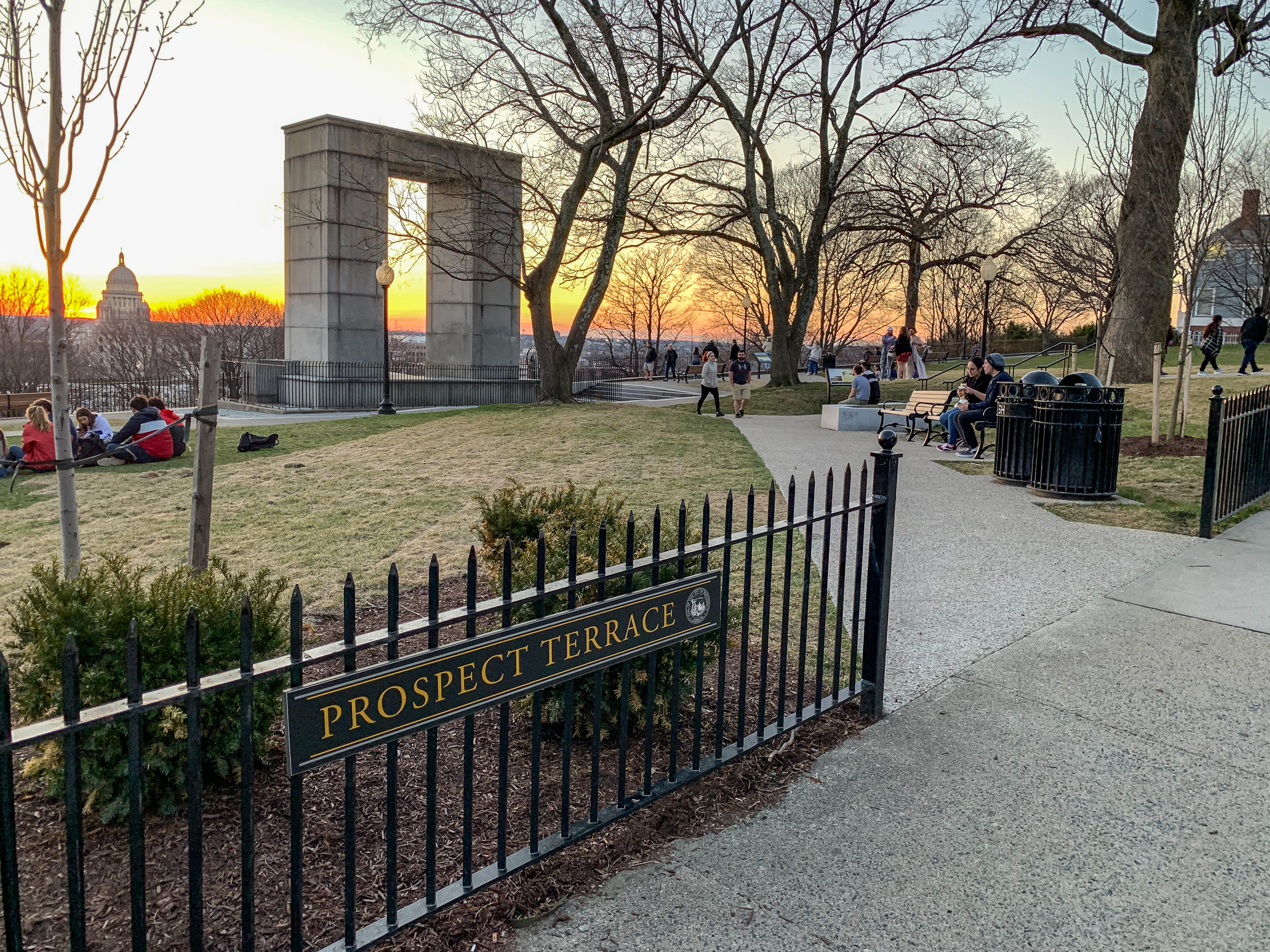
- The park after 2018 renovations
- Interactive map of Prospect Terrace Park
- Location: College Hill, Providence, Rhode Island
- Coordinates: 41.8298224°N 71.4070008°W
- Created: 1869

Prospect Terrace Park is a park located on Congdon Street in the College Hill neighborhood of Providence, Rhode Island. The park was founded in 1869, on land that was given to the city by residents of the neighborhood. The park is known as "The Jewel of the City" for its dramatic elevated view of Downtown Providence.

Author and Providence native H. P. Lovecraft frequently visited the park.

== History ==
A statue of theologian Roger Williams (designed by architect Ralph Thomas Walker) was built in the late 1930s after Williams' descendant Stephen Randall made a deed of gift for the monument. It was dedicated on 29 June 1939. The approximate 15-foot tall granite statue commemorates Williams' founding of the state of Rhode Island and his promotion for religious freedom, and the statue depicts Williams gazing over the city.

In 1939, Roger Williams' remains were moved into a tomb that lies directly beneath the statue. His body had been overgrown by the roots of an apple tree next to his original grave. The roots grew over the form of his body so that it looked similar to a human form. The remainder of his bones were reburied in a bronze casket and placed beneath his statue in Prospect Terrace. The so-called "Williams Root" is preserved and is now on display at the John Brown House Museum on the East Side of Providence.

In 2006, vandals removed all five fingers of the statue's left hand, along with the thumb of his right hand. The damage was repaired in 2010.

In December 2016, efforts were started by the College Hill Neighborhood Association to raise funds for improvements and restoration to the park. New benches, signs, and landscaping, were planned. Previously, the park had not been renovated for 28 years.

== The view ==
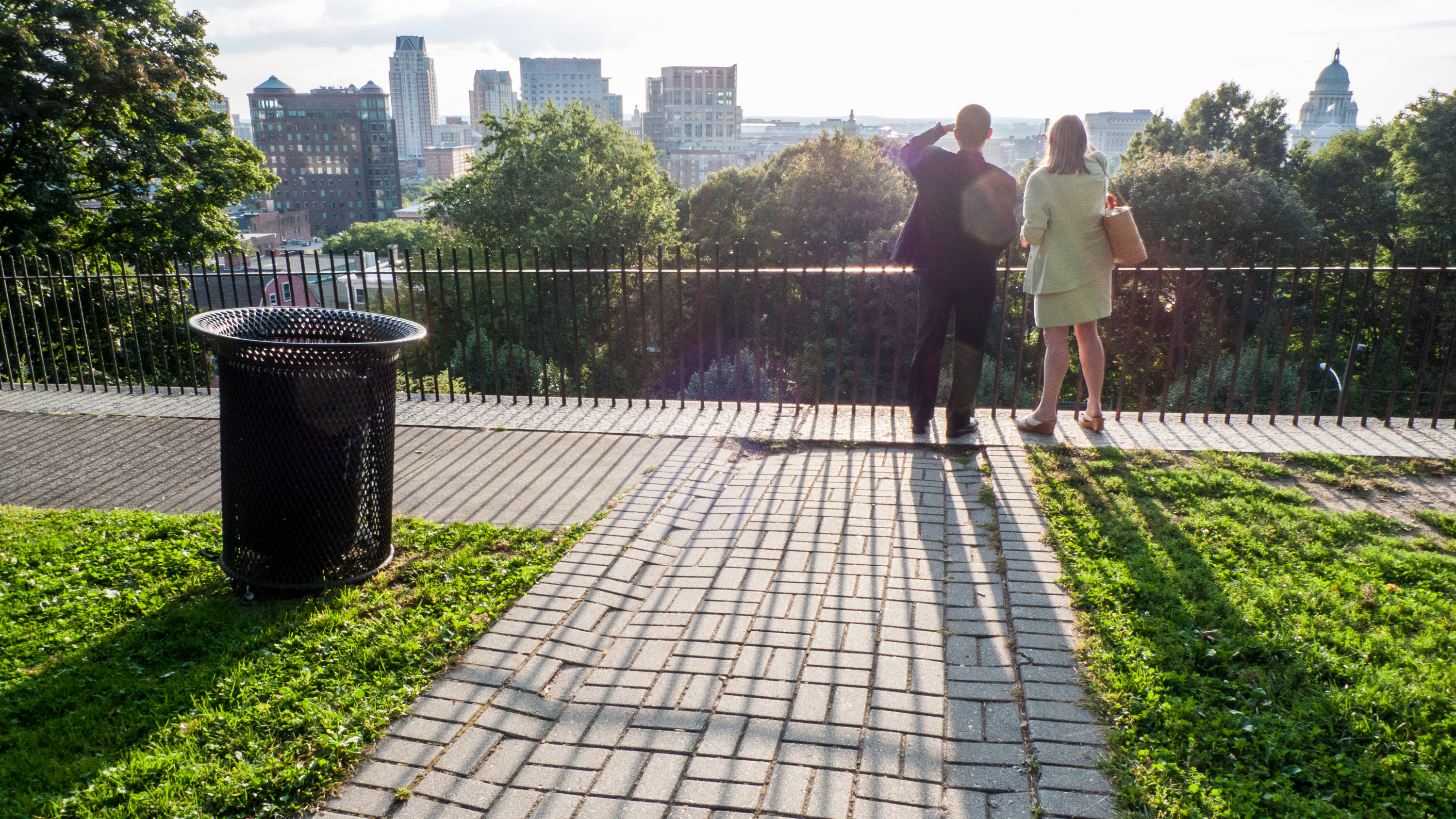
Admiring the view

Prospect Terrace Park attracts visitors and locals alike for its panoramic view of the city. From the elevated location of the park, one can see many of Providence's most prominent landmarks, from Providence Place Mall to the Rhode Island State House to the Meeting House of the First Baptist Church in America. The park's west-facing view makes it ideal for taking in the sunset.

== Gallery ==
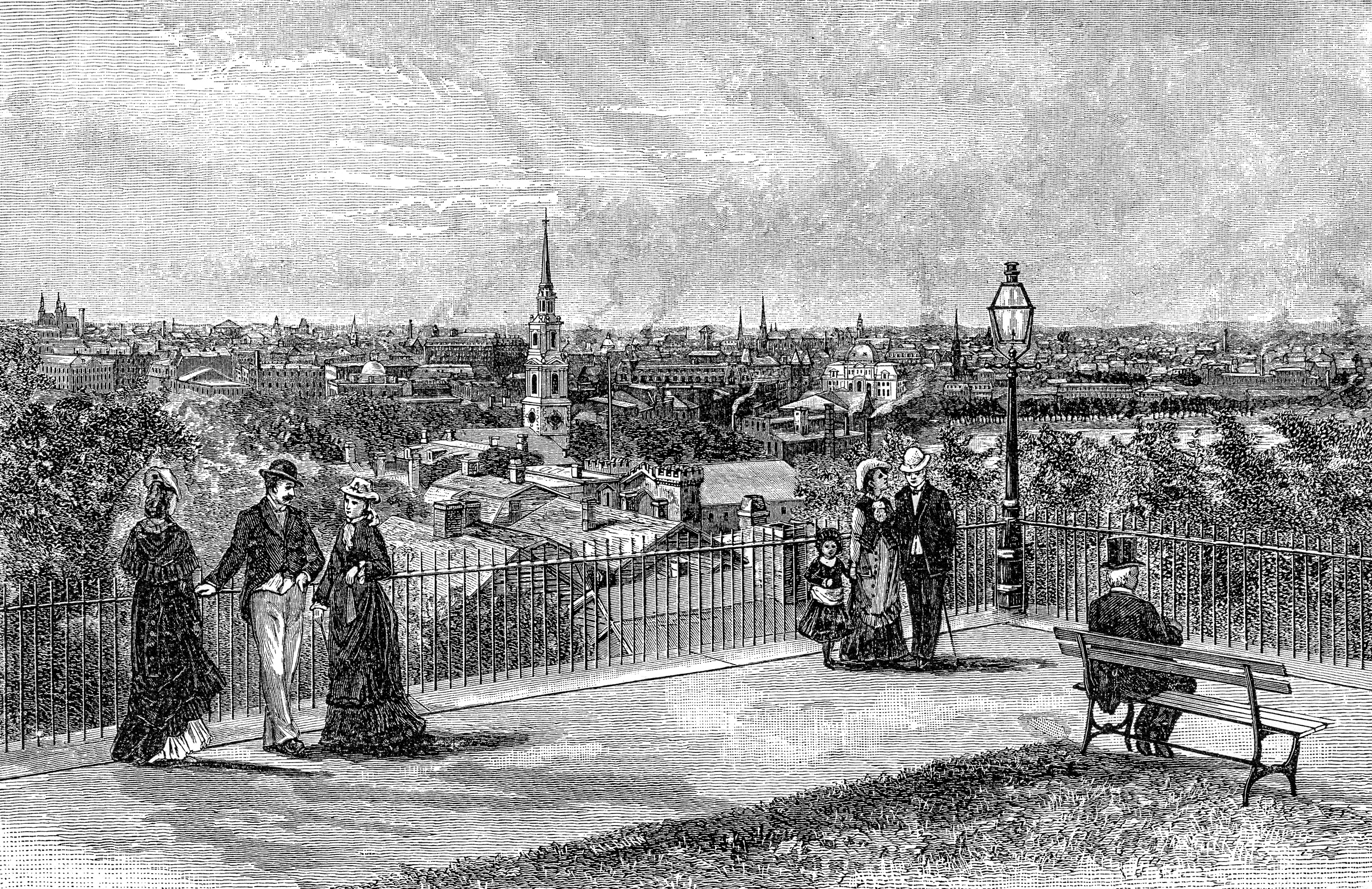
1886 engraving

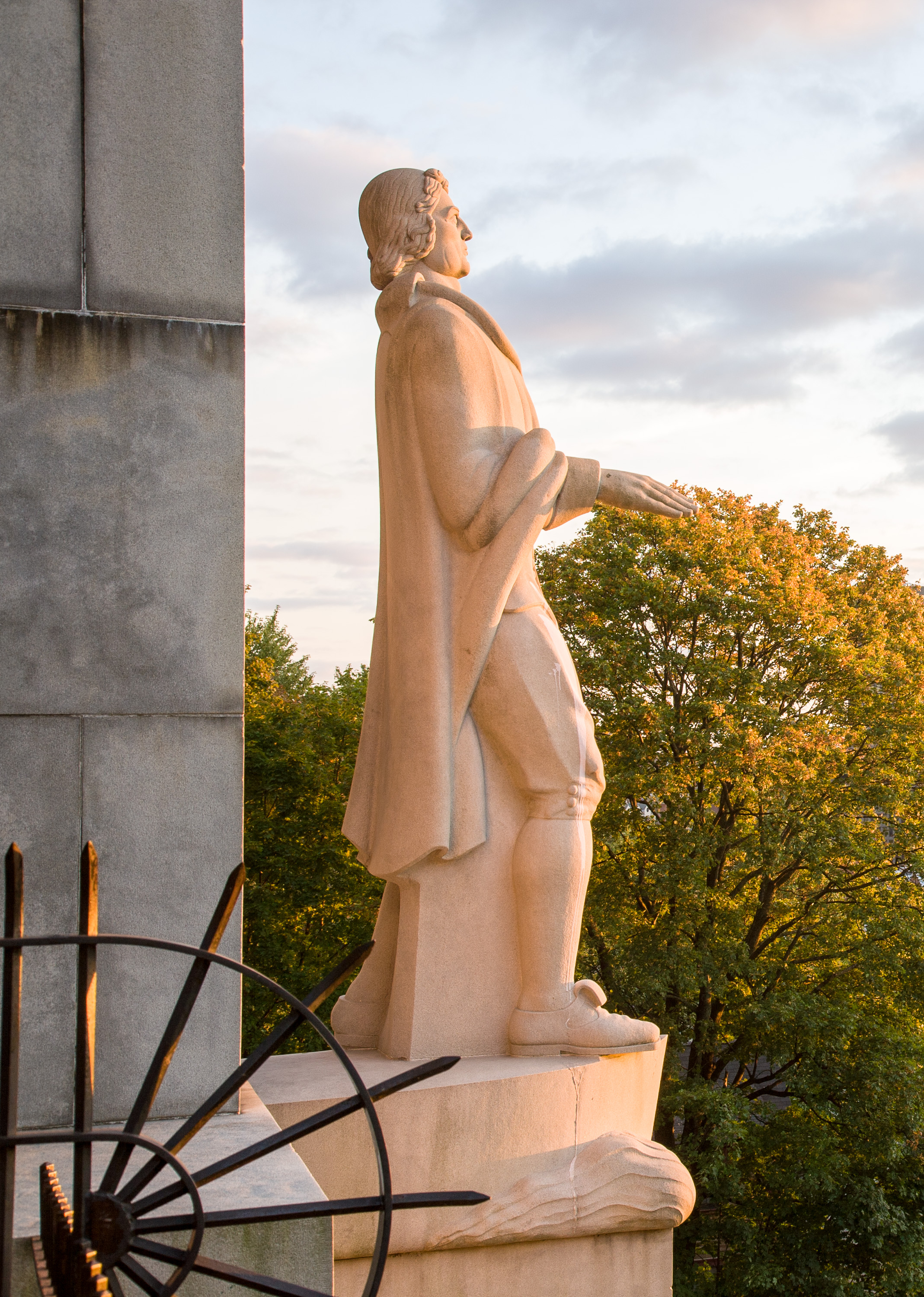
Statue of Roger Williams by Ralph Thomas Walker

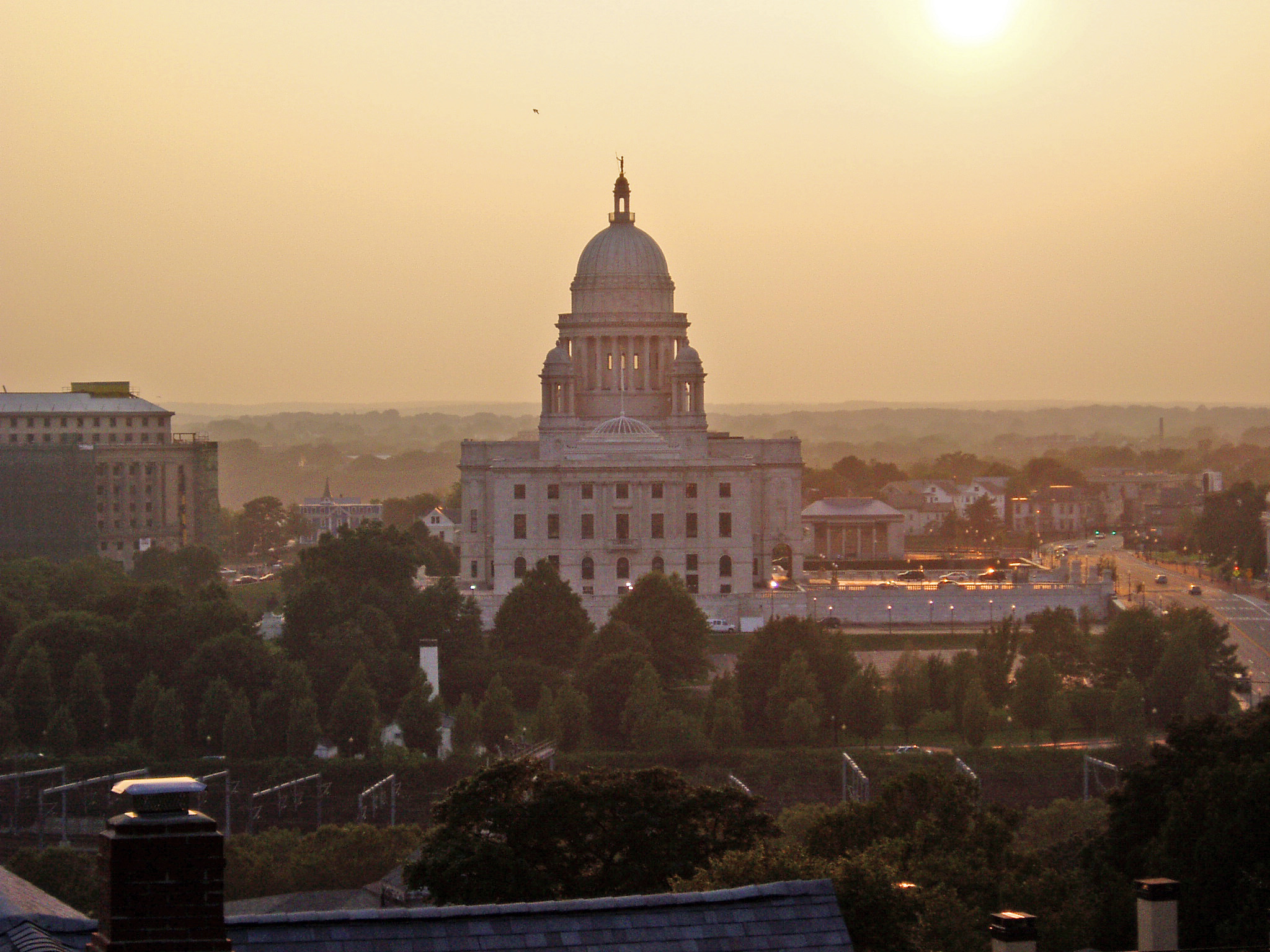
View of the State House from the park

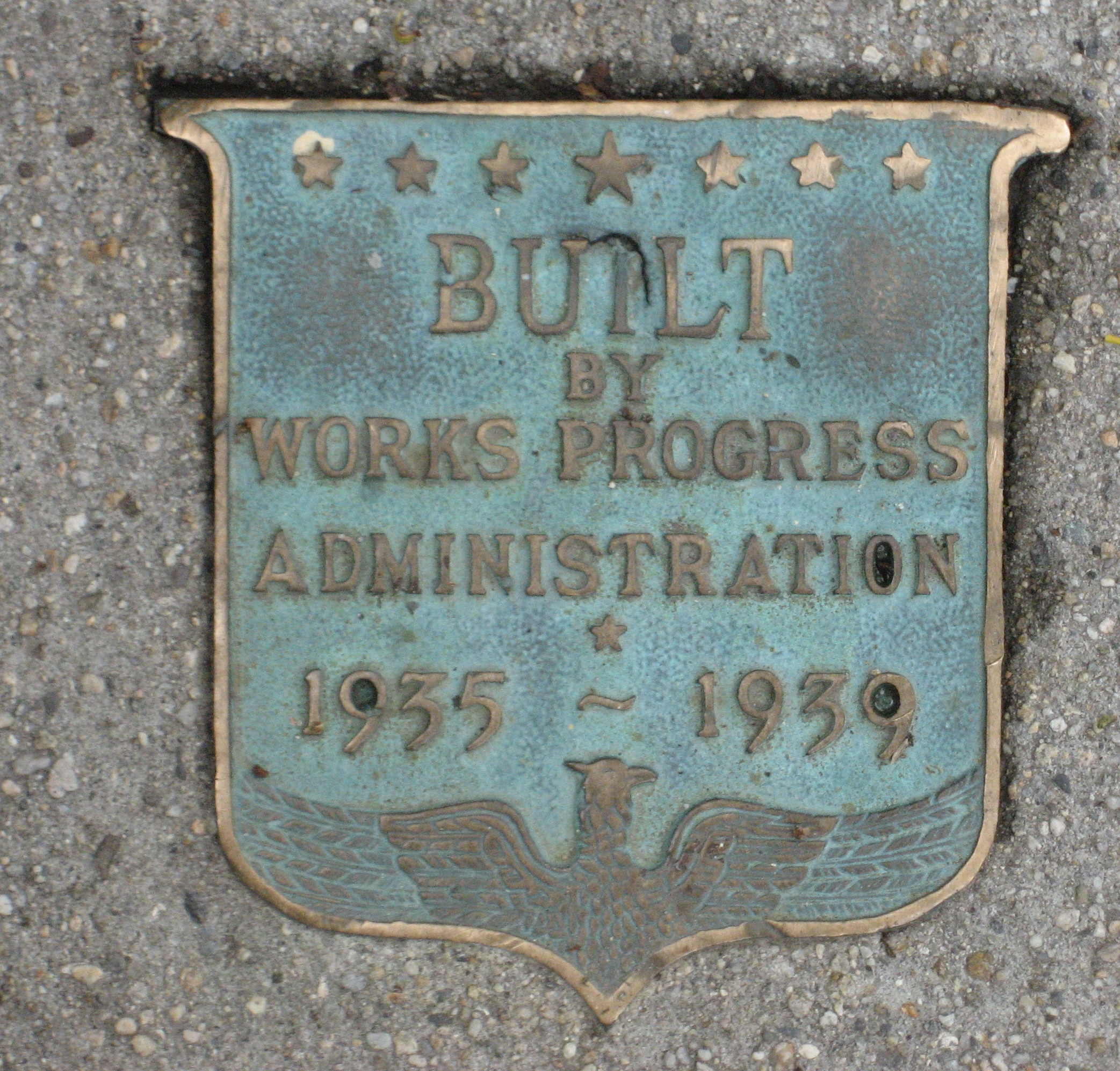
A plaque embedded in the sidewalk of the page contains a WPA logo

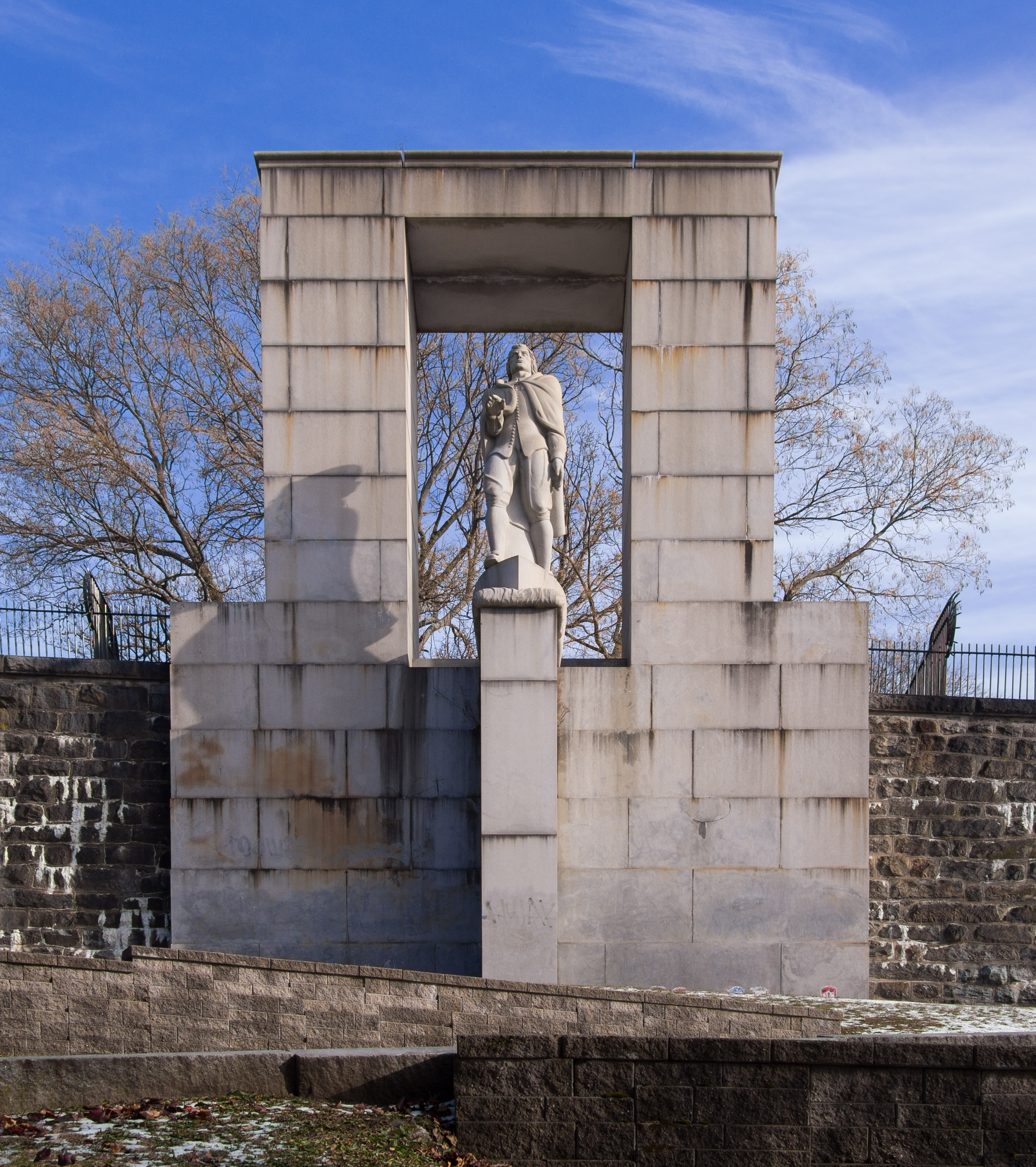
Roger Williams statue

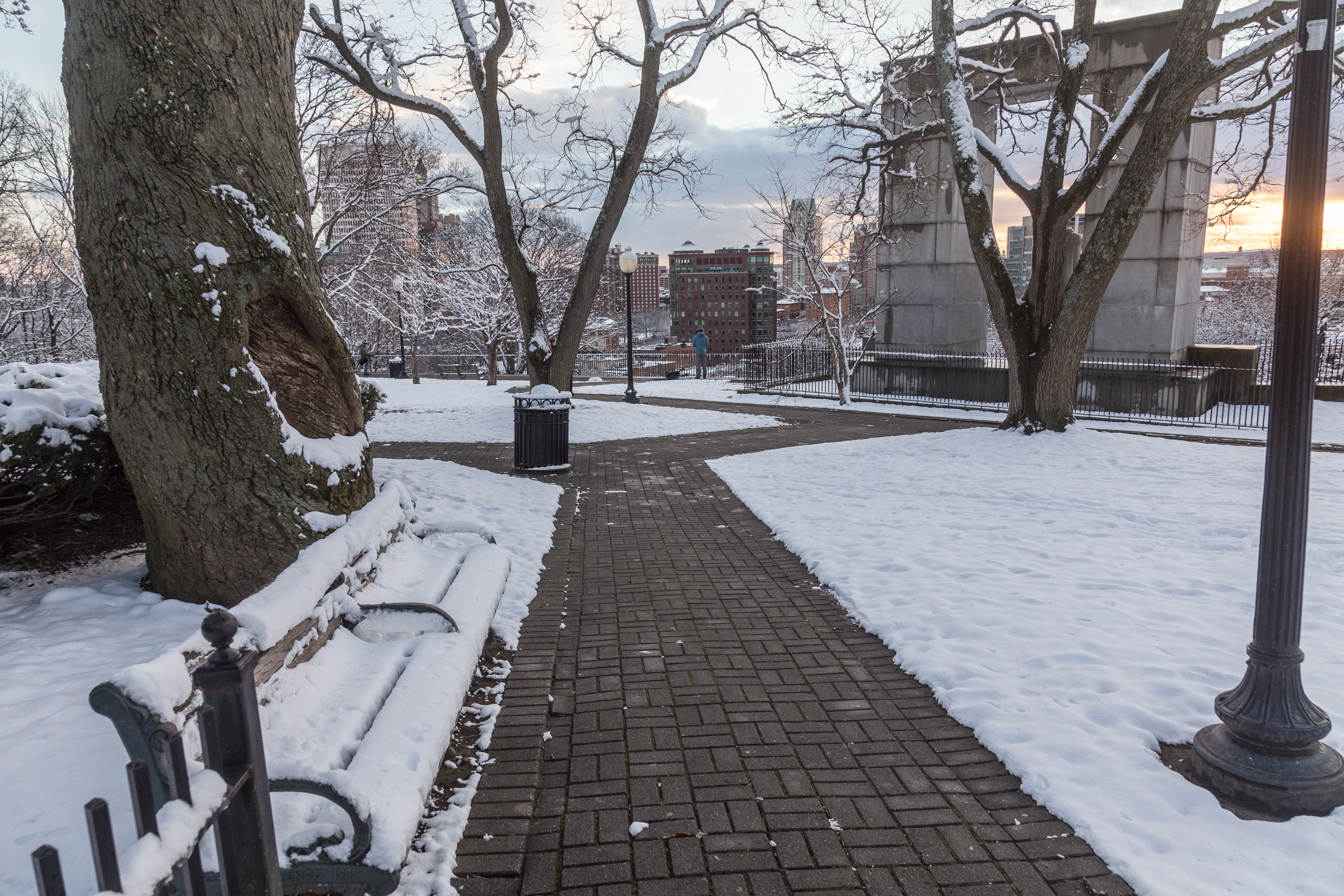
After a snowfall

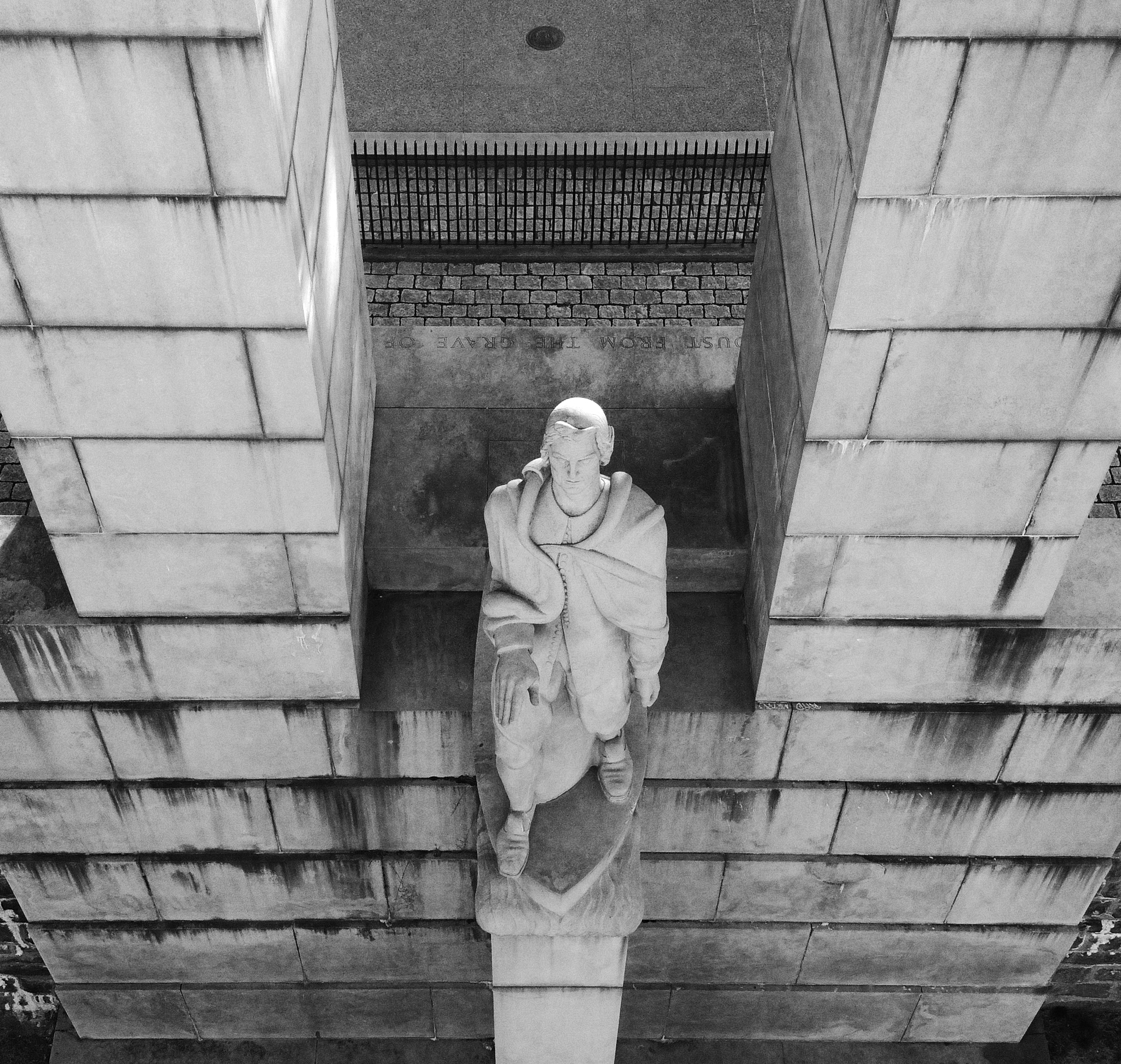
Drone photo
