= John B. Harwood =

American politician

John Harwood

220th Speaker of the Rhode Island House of Representatives
- In office 1993–2002
- Preceded by: Joseph DeAngelis
- Succeeded by: William J. Murphy

Member of the Rhode Island House of Representatives
- In office 1980–2002

Personal details
- Born: January 14, 1952 (age 74) Providence, Rhode Island, U.S.
- Party: Democratic
- Spouse: Patricia May Lynch
- Children: 2

John B. Harwood (born January 14, 1952) is an American politician and lawyer in the state of Rhode Island.

== Biography ==
Harwood was born in Providence in 1952 and attended Mount Saint Charles Academy where he played ice hockey and baseball, earning multiple all-state team selections in both, and twice winning the Interscholastic League scoring title in ice hockey. He earned degrees from University of Pennsylvania (BSc 1974), University of Miami (MBA 1976) and Boston College (J.D. 1978). Harwood also played collegiate hockey at the University of Pennsylvania where he served as captain and was selected for the All-Ivy hockey team. He briefly worked as professor at Nathaniel Hawthorne College in New Hampshire in the 1970s before practicing law in Pawtucket, Rhode Island. Harwood married Patricia Mary Lynch and has a son and three daughters.

A Democrat, Harwood was first elected to the Rhode Island House of Representatives in 1980, representing Pawtucket. He was chosen to serve as Speaker of the House from 1993, serving until 2002. He is a member of the Penn Baseball Hall of Fame, Rhode Island Hockey Hall of Fame and Rhode Island Heritage Hall of Fame.
