= Gregory Schadone =

American politician

Member of the Rhode Island House of Representatives from the 54th district
- In office January 5, 1999 – January 1, 2013
- Succeeded by: William O'Brien

Personal details
- Born: January 25, 1967 (age 59)
- Party: Democratic

Gregory Schadone (born January 25, 1967) is an American politician who served in the Rhode Island House of Representatives from the 54th district from 1999 to 2013.
