= List of Rhode Island schools =

This is a list of schools in Rhode Island.

== High schools ==
See also Category:High schools in Rhode Island

School	District/School type	County	Location
Barrington High School	Barrington School District	Bristol County, Rhode Island	Barrington, Rhode Island
Beacon Charter High School for the Arts	Statewide charter public school	Providence County, Rhode Island	Woonsocket, Rhode Island
Burrillville High School	Burrillville School District	Providence County, Rhode Island	Burrillville, Rhode Island
Central High School	Providence School District	Providence County, Rhode Island	Providence, Rhode Island
Central Falls High School	Central Falls School District	Providence County, Rhode Island	Central Falls, Rhode Island
Chariho Area Career & Technical Center	Chariho Regional School District	Washington County, Rhode Island	Wood River Junction, Rhode Island (Richmond, Rhode Island)
Chariho High School	Chariho Regional School District	Washington County, Rhode Island	Wood River Junction, Rhode Island (Richmond, Rhode Island)
Classical High School	Providence School District	Providence County, Rhode Island	Providence, Rhode Island
Coventry High School	Coventry School District	Kent County, Rhode Island	Coventry, Rhode Island
Cranston Area Career & Technical Center	Cranston School District	Providence County, Rhode Island	Cranston, Rhode Island
Cranston High School East	Cranston School District	Providence County, Rhode Island	Cranston, Rhode Island
Cranston High School West	Cranston School District	Providence County, Rhode Island	Cranston, Rhode Island
Cumberland High School	Cumberland School District	Providence County, Rhode Island	Cumberland, Rhode Island
Davies Career & Technical High School	Lincoln School District	Providence County, Rhode Island	Lincoln, Rhode Island
East Greenwich High School	East Greenwich School District	Kent County, Rhode Island	East Greenwich, Rhode Island
East Providence Area Career & Technical Center	East Providence School District	Providence County, Rhode Island	East Providence, Rhode Island
East Providence High School	East Providence School District	Providence County, Rhode Island	East Providence, Rhode Island
Exeter-West Greenwich Regional	Exeter-West Greenwich Regional School District	Kent County, Rhode Island	West Greenwich, Rhode Island
Feinstein High School	Providence School District	Providence County, Rhode Island	Providence, Rhode Island
The Greene School	Statewide charter public school	Kent County, Rhode Island	West Greenwich, Rhode Island
Hanley Career & Technical Center	Providence School District	Providence County, Rhode Island	Providence, Rhode Island
Hope High School	Providence School District	Providence County, Rhode Island	Providence, Rhode Island
Johnston Senior High School	Johnston School District	Providence County, Rhode Island	Johnston, Rhode Island
Lincoln High School	Lincoln School District	Providence County, Rhode Island	Lincoln, Rhode Island
Middletown High School	Middletown School District	Newport County, Rhode Island	Middletown, Rhode Island
Mt. Hope High School	Bristol Warren Regional School District	Bristol County, Rhode Island	Bristol, Rhode Island
Mount Pleasant High School	Providence School District	Providence County, Rhode Island	Providence, Rhode Island
Narragansett High School	Narragansett School District	Washington County, Rhode Island	Narragansett, Rhode Island
Newport County Career & Technical Center	Newport School District	Newport County, Rhode Island	Newport, Rhode Island
North Kingstown High School	North Kingstown School District	Washington County, Rhode Island	North Kingstown, Rhode Island
North Providence High School	North Providence School District	Providence County, Rhode Island	North Providence, Rhode Island
North Smithfield High School	North Smithfield School District	Providence County, Rhode Island	North Smithfield, Rhode Island
Pilgrim High School	Warwick School District	Kent County, Rhode Island	Warwick, Rhode Island
Ponaganset High School	Foster-Glocester Regional School District	Providence County, Rhode Island	North Scituate, Rhode Island
Portsmouth High School	Portsmouth School District	Newport County, Rhode Island	Portsmouth, Rhode Island
Rogers High School	Newport School District	Newport County, Rhode Island	Newport, Rhode Island
Scituate High School	Scituate School District	Providence County, Rhode Island	Scituate, Rhode Island
Shea High School	Pawtucket School District	Providence County, Rhode Island	Pawtucket, Rhode Island
Smithfield High School	Smithfield School District	Providence County, Rhode Island	Smithfield, Rhode Island
South Kingstown High School	South Kingstown School District	Washington County, Rhode Island	Wakefield, Rhode Island
Time Squared Academy	Charter public school in Providence School District	Providence County, Rhode Island	Providence, Rhode Island
Tiverton High School	Tiverton School District	Newport County, Rhode Island	Tiverton, Rhode Island
Toll Gate High School	Warwick School District	Kent County, Rhode Island	Warwick, Rhode Island
Tolman High School	Pawtucket School District	Providence County, Rhode Island	Pawtucket, Rhode Island
Warwick Area Career & Technical Center	Warwick School District	Kent County, Rhode Island	Warwick, Rhode Island
West Warwick High School	West Warwick School District	Kent County, Rhode Island	West Warwick, Rhode Island
Westerly High School	Westerly School District	Washington County, Rhode Island	Westerly, Rhode Island
Woonsocket High School	Woonsocket School District	Providence County, Rhode Island	Woonsocket, Rhode Island
Woonsocket Area Career and Technical Center	Woonsocket School District	Providence County, Rhode Island	Woonsocket, Rhode Island

== Middle and junior high schools ==
School	District/School type	County	Location
Archie R. Cole Middle School	East Greenwich School District	Kent County, Rhode Island	East Greenwich, Rhode Island
Barrington Middle School	Barrington School District	Bristol County, Rhode Island	Barrington, Rhode Island
Birchwood Middle School	North Providence School District	Providence County, Rhode Island	North Providence, Rhode Island
Bishop Middle School	Providence School District	Providence County, Rhode Island	Providence, Rhode Island
Block Island School	N/A	Washington County, Rhode Island	New Shoreham, Rhode Island
Broad Rock Middle School	South Kingstown School District	Washington County, Rhode Island	Wakefield, Rhode Island
Burrillville Middle School	Burrillville School District	Providence County, Rhode Island	Burrillville, Rhode Island
Calcutt Middle School	Central Falls School District	Providence County, Rhode Island	Central Falls, Rhode Island
Chariho Regional Middle School	Chariho Regional School District	Washington County, Rhode Island	Wood River Junction, Rhode Island (Richmond, Rhode Island)
Colt-Andrews Middle School	Bristol Warren Regional School District	Bristol County, Rhode Island	Bristol, Rhode Island
Curtis Corner Middle School	South Kingstown School District	Washington County, Rhode Island	Wakefield, Rhode Island
Davisville Middle School	North Kingstown School District	Washington County, Rhode Island	North Kingstown, Rhode Island
Delsesto Middle School	Providence School District	Providence County, Rhode Island	Providence, Rhode Island
Deering Middle School	West Warwick School District	Kent County, Rhode Island	West Warwick, Rhode Island
Eldredge Middle School	East Greenwich School District	Kent County, Rhode Island	East Greenwich, Rhode Island
Exeter-West Greenwich Regional Junior High School	Exeter-West Greenwich Regional School District	Kent County, Rhode Island	West Greenwich, Rhode Island
Feinstein Middle School	Coventry School District	Kent County, Rhode Island	Coventry, Rhode Island
Ferri Middle School	Johnston School District	Providence County, Rhode Island	Johnston, Rhode Island
Gallagher Middle School	Smithfield School District	Providence County, Rhode Island	Smithfield, Rhode Island
Gaudet Middle School	Middletown School District	Newport County, Rhode Island	Middletown, Rhode Island
Goff Junior High School	Pawtucket School District	Providence County, Rhode Island	Pawtucket, Rhode Island
Greene Middle School	Providence School District	Providence County, Rhode Island	Providence, Rhode Island
Hampden Meadows Middle School	Barrington School District	Bristol County, Rhode Island	Barrington, Rhode Island
Hanaford Middle School	East Greenwich School District	Kent County, Rhode Island	East Greenwich, Rhode Island
Hopkins Middle School	Providence School District	Providence County, Rhode Island	Providence, Rhode Island
Jamestown Middle School-Lawn	Jamestown School District	Newport County, Rhode Island	Jamestown, Rhode Island
Kickemuit Middle School	Bristol Warren Regional School District	Bristol County, Rhode Island	Warren, Rhode Island
Lincoln Middle School	Lincoln School District	Providence County, Rhode Island	Lincoln, Rhode Island
Martin Middle School	East Providence School District	Providence County, Rhode Island	East Providence, Rhode Island
McCourt Middle School	Cumberland School District	Providence County, Rhode Island	Cumberland, Rhode Island
Narragansett Pier Middle School	Narragansett School District	Washington County, Rhode Island	Narragansett, Rhode Island
North Cumberland Middle School	Cumberland School District	Providence County, Rhode Island	Cumberland, Rhode Island
North Smithfield Middle School	North Smithfield School District	Providence County, Rhode Island	North Smithfield, Rhode Island
Portsmouth Middle School	Portsmouth School District	Newport County, Rhode Island	Portsmouth, Rhode Island
Quirk Middle School	Bristol Warren Regional School District	Bristol County, Rhode Island	Warren, Rhode Island
Riverside Middle School	East Providence School District	Providence County, Rhode Island	East Providence, Rhode Island
Scituate Middle School	Scituate School District	Providence County, Rhode Island	Scituate, Rhode Island
Stuart Middle School	Providence School District	Providence County, Rhode Island	Providence, Rhode Island
Thompson Middle School	Newport School District	Newport County, Rhode Island	Newport, Rhode Island
Tiverton Middle School	Tiverton School District	Newport County, Rhode Island	Tiverton, Rhode Island
Warwick Veterans Memorial Middle School	Warwick School District	Kent County, Rhode Island	Warwick, Rhode Island
West Broadway Middle School	Providence School District	Providence County, Rhode Island	Providence, Rhode Island
Westerly Middle School	Westerly School District	Washington County, Rhode Island	Westerly, Rhode Island
Western Hills Middle School	Cranston School District	Providence County, Rhode Island	Cranston, Rhode Island
Wickford Middle School	North Kingstown School District	Washington County, Rhode Island	North Kingstown, Rhode Island
Wilbur & McMahon Schools	Little Compton School District	Newport County, Rhode Island	Little Compton, Rhode Island
Williams Middle School	Providence School District	Providence County, Rhode Island	Providence, Rhode Island
Winman Middle School	Warwick School District	Kent County, Rhode Island	Warwick, Rhode Island

== Elementary schools ==
School	District/School type	County	Location
Aquidneck School	Middletown School District	Newport County, Rhode Island	Middletown, Rhode Island
Arlington School	Cranston School District	Providence County, Rhode Island	Cranston, Rhode Island
Ashaway School	Chariho Regional School District	Washington County, Rhode Island	Ashaway, Rhode Island
Ashton School	Cumberland School District	Providence County, Rhode Island	Cumberland, Rhode Island
Bailey School	Providence Public School District	Providence County, Rhode Island	Providence, Rhode Island
Barnes School	Johnston School District	Providence County, Rhode Island	Johnston, Rhode Island
Barrows School	Cranston School District	Providence County, Rhode Island	Cranston, Rhode Island
Blackrock School	Coventry School District	Kent County, Rhode Island	Coventry, Rhode Island
Block Island School (K-12)	N/A	Washington County, Rhode Island	New Shoreham, Rhode Island
Bradford School	Westerly School District	Washington County, Rhode Island	Bradford, Rhode Island
Brown Avenue School	Johnston School District	Providence County, Rhode Island	Johnston, Rhode Island
Byfield School	Bristol Warren Regional School District	Bristol County, Rhode Island	Bristol, Rhode Island
Callahan School	Burrillville School Department	Providence County, Rhode Island	Burrillville, Rhode Island
Carey School	Newport School District	Newport County, Rhode Island	Newport, Rhode Island
Carnevale School	Providence Public School District	Providence County, Rhode Island	Providence, Rhode Island
Cedar Hill School	Warwick School District	Kent County, Rhode Island	Warwick, Rhode Island
Centredale School	North Providence School District	Providence County, Rhode Island	North Providence, Rhode Island
Charlestown School	Chariho Regional School District	Washington County, Rhode Island	Charlestown, Rhode Island
Clayville School	Scituate School District	Providence County, Rhode Island	Scituate, Rhode Island
Coggeshall School	Newport School District	Newport County, Rhode Island	Newport, Rhode Island
Community School	Cumberland School District	Providence County, Rhode Island	Cumberland, Rhode Island
Curtis School	Pawtucket School District	Providence County, Rhode Island	Pawtucket, Rhode Island
D'Abate School	Providence Public School District	Providence County, Rhode Island	Providence, Rhode Island
Davisville School	North Kingstown School District	Washington County, Rhode Island	North Kingstown, Rhode Island
Dunn's Corners School	Westerly School District	Washington County, Rhode Island	Westerly, Rhode Island
DuTemple School	Cranston School District	Providence County, Rhode Island	Cranston, Rhode Island
Eden Park School	Cranston School District	Providence County, Rhode Island	Cranston, Rhode Island
Edgewood Highland School	Cranston School District	Providence County, Rhode Island	Cranston, Rhode Island
Elmhurst School	Portsmouth School District	Newport County, Rhode Island	Portsmouth, Rhode Island
Feinstein School (2 campuses)	Providence Public School District	Providence County, Rhode Island	Providence, Rhode Island
Fishing Cove School	North Kingstown School District	Washington County, Rhode Island	North Kingstown, Rhode Island
Fogarty School	Providence Public School District	Providence County, Rhode Island	Providence, Rhode Island
Fogarty Memorial School	Glocester Elementary School District	Providence County, Rhode Island	Glocester, Rhode Island
Forest Avenue School	Middletown School District	Newport County, Rhode Island	Middletown, Rhode Island
Forest Park School	North Kingstown School District	Washington County, Rhode Island	North Kingstown, Rhode Island
Fort Barton School	Tiverton School District	Newport County, Rhode Island	Tiverton, Rhode Island
Fortes School	Providence Public School District	Providence County, Rhode Island	Providence, Rhode Island
Frank Spaziano School/Annex	Providence Public School District	Providence County, Rhode Island	Providence, Rhode Island
Frenchtown School	East Greenwich School District	Kent County, Rhode Island	East Greenwich, Rhode Island
Garden City School	Cranston School District	Providence County, Rhode Island	Cranston, Rhode Island
Garvin Memorial School	Cumberland School District	Providence County, Rhode Island	Cumberland, Rhode Island
Gladstone Street School	Cranston School District	Providence County, Rhode Island	Cranston, Rhode Island
Glen Hills School	Cranston School District	Providence County, Rhode Island	Cranston, Rhode Island
Greenbush School	West Warwick School District	Kent County, Rhode Island	West Warwick, Rhode Island
Greenwood School	Warwick School District	Kent County, Rhode Island	Warwick, Rhode Island
Gregorian School	Providence Public School District	Providence County, Rhode Island	Providence, Rhode Island
Guiteras School	Bristol Warren Regional School District	Bristol County, Rhode Island	Bristol, Rhode Island
Halliwell School	North Smithfield School District	Providence County, Rhode Island	North Smithfield, Rhode Island
Hamilton School	North Kingstown School District	Washington County, Rhode Island	North Kingstown, Rhode Island
Hazard School	South Kingstown School District	Washington County, Rhode Island	Wakefield, Rhode Island
Hennessy School	East Providence School District	Providence County, Rhode Island	East Providence, Rhode Island
Holliman School	Warwick School District	Kent County, Rhode Island	Warwick, Rhode Island
Hope School	Scituate School District	Providence County, Rhode Island	Scituate, Rhode Island
Hope Valley School	Chariho Regional School District	Washington County, Rhode Island	Hope Valley, Rhode Island
Hopkins Hill School	Coventry School District	Kent County, Rhode Island	Coventry, Rhode Island
Horgan School	West Warwick School District	Kent County, Rhode Island	West Warwick, Rhode Island
Howard Hathaway School	Portsmouth School District	Newport County, Rhode Island	Portsmouth, Rhode Island
Hoxsie School	Warwick School District	Kent County, Rhode Island	Warwick, Rhode Island
Hugh Cole School	Bristol Warren Regional School District	Bristol County, Rhode Island	Warren, Rhode Island
Jamestown School-Melrose	Jamestown School District	Newport County, Rhode Island	Jamestown, Rhode Island
Kennedy School (Middletown)	Middletown School District	Newport County, Rhode Island	Middletown, Rhode Island
Kennedy School (Providence)	Providence Public School District	Providence County, Rhode Island	Providence, Rhode Island
Kent Heights School	East Providence School District	Providence County, Rhode Island	East Providence, Rhode Island
King School	Providence Public School District	Providence County, Rhode Island	Providence, Rhode Island
Kingston Hill Academy Charter School	Charter	Washington County, Rhode Island	Peace Dale, Rhode Island
Kizirian School	Providence Public School District	Providence County, Rhode Island	Providence, Rhode Island
LaPerche School	Smithfield School District	Providence County, Rhode Island	Smithfield, Rhode Island
Lauro School	Providence Public School District	Providence County, Rhode Island	Providence, Rhode Island
Levy School	Burrillville School Department	Providence County, Rhode Island	Burrillville, Rhode Island
Lincoln Central School	Lincoln Public Schools	Providence County, Rhode Island	Lincoln, Rhode Island
Lineham School	Exeter-West Greenwich Regional School District	Kent County, Rhode Island	West Greenwich, Rhode Island
Lima School/Annex	Providence Public School District	Providence County, Rhode Island	Providence, Rhode Island
Linden School	Middletown School District	Newport County, Rhode Island	Middletown, Rhode Island
Lippitt School	Warwick School District	Kent County, Rhode Island	Warwick, Rhode Island
Lonsdale School	Lincoln Public Schools	Providence County, Rhode Island	Lincoln, Rhode Island
Matunuck School	South Kingstown School District	Washington County, Rhode Island	Wakefield, Rhode Island
McLaughlin Cumberland Hill School	Cumberland School District	Providence County, Rhode Island	Cumberland, Rhode Island
Meadowbrook Farms School	East Greenwich School District	Kent County, Rhode Island	East Greenwich, Rhode Island
Melville School	Portsmouth School District	Newport County, Rhode Island	Portsmouth, Rhode Island
Messer School	Providence Public School District	Providence County, Rhode Island	Providence, Rhode Island
Metcalf School	Exeter-West Greenwich Regional School District	Washington County, Rhode Island	Exeter, Rhode Island
Narragansett School	Narragansett School District	Washington County, Rhode Island	Narragansett, Rhode Island
Nayatt School	Barrington School District	Bristol County, Rhode Island	Barrington, Rhode Island
Nonquit School	Tiverton School District	Newport County, Rhode Island	Tiverton, Rhode Island
North Scituate School	Scituate School District	Providence County, Rhode Island	Scituate, Rhode Island
North Smithfield School	North Smithfield School District	Providence County, Rhode Island	North Smithfield, Rhode Island
Northern Lincoln School	Lincoln Public Schools	Providence County, Rhode Island	Lincoln, Rhode Island
Norton School	Cumberland School District	Providence County, Rhode Island	Cumberland, Rhode Island
Norwood School	Warwick School District	Kent County, Rhode Island	Warwick, Rhode Island
Oak Haven School	Coventry School District	Kent County, Rhode Island	Coventry, Rhode Island
Oak Lawn School	Cranston School District	Providence County, Rhode Island	Cranston, Rhode Island
Oakland Beach School	Warwick School District	Kent County, Rhode Island	Warwick, Rhode Island
Old County Road School	Smithfield School District	Providence County, Rhode Island	Smithfield, Rhode Island
Olney School	North Providence School District	Providence County, Rhode Island	North Providence, Rhode Island
Orchard Farms School	Cranston School District	Providence County, Rhode Island	Cranston, Rhode Island
Orlo Avenue School	East Providence School District	Providence County, Rhode Island	East Providence, Rhode Island
Park School	Warwick School District	Kent County, Rhode Island	Warwick, Rhode Island
Peace Dale School	South Kingstown School District	Washington County, Rhode Island	Peace Dale, Rhode Island
Peters School	Cranston School District	Providence County, Rhode Island	Cranston, Rhode Island
Pleasant View School (Providence)	Providence Public School District	Providence County, Rhode Island	Providence, Rhode Island
Pleasant View School (Smithfield)	Smithfield School District	Providence County, Rhode Island	Smithfield, Rhode Island
Pocasset School	Tiverton School District	Newport County, Rhode Island	Tiverton, Rhode Island
Primrose Hill School	Barrington School District	Bristol County, Rhode Island	Barrington, Rhode Island
Providence Street School	West Warwick School District	Kent County, Rhode Island	West Warwick, Rhode Island
Prudence Island School	Portsmouth School District	Newport County, Rhode Island	Prudence Island, Rhode Island
Quidnessett School	North Kingstown School District	Washington County, Rhode Island	North Kingstown, Rhode Island
Quinn School	West Warwick School District	Kent County, Rhode Island	West Warwick, Rhode Island
Raíces Dual Language Academy	Central Falls School District	Providence County, Rhode Island	Central Falls, Rhode Island
Ranger School	Tiverton School District	Newport County, Rhode Island	Tiverton, Rhode Island
Reservoir School	Providence Public School District	Providence County, Rhode Island	Providence, Rhode Island
Reynolds School	Bristol Warren Regional School District	Bristol County, Rhode Island	Bristol, Rhode Island
Risk School	Central Falls School District	Providence County, Rhode Island	Central Falls, Rhode Island
Richmond School	Chariho Regional School District	Washington County, Rhode Island	Richmond, Rhode Island
Robertson School	Warwick School District	Kent County, Rhode Island	Warwick, Rhode Island
Rockwell School	Bristol Warren Regional School District	Bristol County, Rhode Island	Bristol, Rhode Island
Saylesville School	Lincoln Public Schools	Providence County, Rhode Island	Lincoln, Rhode Island
Scott School	Warwick School District	Kent County, Rhode Island	Warwick, Rhode Island
Sherman School	Warwick School District	Kent County, Rhode Island	Warwick, Rhode Island
Silver Spring School	East Providence School District	Providence County, Rhode Island	East Providence, Rhode Island
South Road School	South Kingstown School District	Washington County, Rhode Island	Wakefield, Rhode Island
Sowams School	Barrington School District	Bristol County, Rhode Island	Barrington, Rhode Island
Springbrook School	Westerly School District	Washington County, Rhode Island	Westerly, Rhode Island
Stadium School	Cranston School District	Providence County, Rhode Island	Cranston, Rhode Island
State Street School	Westerly School District	Washington County, Rhode Island	Westerly, Rhode Island
Steere Farm School	Burrillville School Department	Providence County, Rhode Island	Burrillville, Rhode Island
Stone Hill School	Cranston School District	Providence County, Rhode Island	Cranston, Rhode Island
Stony Lane School	North Kingstown School District	Washington County, Rhode Island	North Kingstown, Rhode Island
Sullivan School	Newport School District	Newport County, Rhode Island	Newport, Rhode Island
Thornton School	Johnston School District	Providence County, Rhode Island	Johnston, Rhode Island
Tiogue School	Coventry School District	Kent County, Rhode Island	Coventry, Rhode Island
Tower Street School	Westerly School District	Washington County, Rhode Island	Westerly, Rhode Island
Underwood School	Newport School District	Newport County, Rhode Island	Newport, Rhode Island
Veazie School	Providence Public School District	Providence County, Rhode Island	Providence, Rhode Island
Veterans Memorial School	Central Falls School District	Providence County, Rhode Island	Central Falls, Rhode Island
Waddington School	East Providence School District	Providence County, Rhode Island	East Providence, Rhode Island
Wakefield School	South Kingstown School District	Washington County, Rhode Island	Wakefield, Rhode Island
Warwick Neck School	Warwick School District	Kent County, Rhode Island	Warwick, Rhode Island
Washington Oak School	Coventry School District	Kent County, Rhode Island	Coventry, Rhode Island
Waterman School	Cranston School District	Providence County, Rhode Island	Cranston, Rhode Island
Wawaloam School	Exeter-West Greenwich Regional School District	Washington County, Rhode Island	Exeter, Rhode Island
Webster School	Providence Public School District	Providence County, Rhode Island	Providence, Rhode Island
West School	Providence Public School District	Providence County, Rhode Island	Providence, Rhode Island
West Glocester School	Glocester Elementary School District	Providence County, Rhode Island	Glocester, Rhode Island
West Kingston School	South Kingstown School District	Washington County, Rhode Island	West Kingston, Rhode Island
Western Coventry School	Coventry School District	Kent County, Rhode Island	Coventry, Rhode Island
Whiteknact School	East Providence School District	Providence County, Rhode Island	East Providence, Rhode Island
Wickford School	North Kingstown School District	Washington County, Rhode Island	North Kingstown, Rhode Island
Wilbur & McMahon Schools	Little Compton School District	Newport County, Rhode Island	Little Compton, Rhode Island
Winsor Hill School	Johnston School District	Providence County, Rhode Island	Johnston, Rhode Island
Woonsocket School	Woonsocket School District	Providence County, Rhode Island	Woonsocket, Rhode Island
Wyman School	Warwick School District	Kent County, Rhode Island	Warwick, Rhode Island
Young & Woods School	Providence Public School District	Providence County, Rhode Island	Providence, Rhode Island

== Private schools and Other Schools ==
School	Religion	Grades served	County	Location	Single-sex/Co-educational
All Saints STEAM Academy	Diocese of Providence	PK-8	Newport County, Rhode Island	Middletown, Rhode Island	Co-Educational
Barrington Christian Academy	Christian	K-12	Bristol County, Rhode Island	Barrington, Rhode Island	Co-Educational
Bishop Hendricken High School	Diocese of Providence	8-12	Kent County, Rhode Island	Warwick, Rhode Island	All-male
Bishop McVinney School	Diocese of Providence	PK-8	Providence County, Rhode Island	Providence, Rhode Island	Co-educational
Blessed Sacrament School	Diocese of Providence	PK-8	Providence County, Rhode Island	Providence, Rhode Island	Co-educational
Community Preparatory School	Independent	4-8	Providence County, Rhode Island	Providence, Rhode Island	Co-educational
Croft School	Independent	K-5	Providence County, Rhode Island	Providence, Rhode Island	Co-educational
DeLaSalle Middle School	Diocese of Providence	6-8	Providence County, Rhode Island	Providence, Rhode Island	Co-educational
French-American School of Rhode Island	Independent	PK-8	Providence County, Rhode Island	Providence, Rhode Island	Co-educational
Fr. John V. Doyle School	Diocese of Providence	PK-8	Kent County, Rhode Island	Coventry, Rhode Island	Co-educational
Good Shepherd Regional Catholic School	Diocese of Providence	PK-8	Providence County, Rhode Island	Woonsocket, Rhode Island	Co-educational
Gordon School	Independent	PK-8	Providence County, Rhode Island	East Providence, Rhode Island	Co-educational
Grace School	Independent	K-8	Providence County, Rhode Island	Providence, Rhode Island	Co-educational
Henry Barnard School	Independent	PK-5	Providence County, Rhode Island	Providence, Rhode Island	Co-educational
Immaculate Conception Regional Catholic School	Diocese of Providence	PK-8	Providence County, Rhode Island	Cranston, Rhode Island	Co-educational
Islamic School of Rhode Island	Muslim	PK-8	Kent County, Rhode Island	West Warwick, Rhode Island	Co-educational
Jewish Community Day School of Rhode Island	Jewish	PK-5	Providence County, Rhode Island	Providence, Rhode Island	Co-educational
La Salle Academy	Diocese of Providence	6-12	Providence County, Rhode Island	Providence, Rhode Island	Co-educational
The Lincoln School	Quaker	K-12	Providence County, Rhode Island	Providence, Rhode Island	All-female
Meadowbrook Waldorf School	Independent	PK-8	Washington County, Rhode Island	Richmond, Rhode Island	Co-educational
Mercymount Country Day School	Diocese of Providence	PK-8	Providence County, Rhode Island	Cumberland, Rhode Island	Co-educational
Middlebridge School	Independent, Boarding	9-12	Washington County, Rhode Island	Narragansett, Rhode Island	Co-educational
Msgr. Matthew F. Clarke Regional Catholic School	Diocese of Providence	PK-8	Washington County, Rhode Island	Wakefield, Rhode Island	Co-educational
Moses Brown School	Quaker	PK-12	Providence County, Rhode Island	Providence, Rhode Island	Co-educational
Mount Saint Charles Academy	Diocese of Providence	6-12	Providence County, Rhode Island	Woonsocket, Rhode Island	Co-educational
New England Academy of Torah	Jewish	9-12	Providence County, Rhode Island	Providence, Rhode Island	All-female
Ocean State Montessori School	Independent	PK-6	Providence County, Rhode Island	East Providence, Rhode Island	Co-educational
Our Lady of Mercy Regional School	Diocese of Providence	PK-8	Bristol County, Rhode Island	Bristol, Rhode Island	Co-educational
Our Lady of Mount Carmel School	Diocese of Providence	PK-8	Kent County, Rhode Island	East Greenwich, Rhode Island	Co-educational
Overbrook Academy	Diocese of Providence	6-9	Providence County, Rhode Island	Greenville, Rhode Island	All-female
Pennfield School	Independent	PK-8	Newport County, Rhode Island	Portsmouth, Rhode Island	Co-educational
Portsmouth Abbey School	Diocese of Providence	9-12	Newport County, Rhode Island	Portsmouth, Rhode Island	Co-educational
Prout School	Diocese of Providence	9-12	Washington County, Rhode Island	Wakefield, Rhode Island	Co-educational
Providence Country Day School	Independent	5-12	Providence County, Rhode Island	East Providence, Rhode Island	Co-educational
Providence Hebrew Day School	Jewish	PK-8	Providence County, Rhode Island	Providence, Rhode Island	Co-educational
Quest Montessori School	Independent	PK-8	Washington County, Rhode Island	Narragansett, Rhode Island	Co-educational
Rocky Hill Country Day School	Independent	PK-12	Kent County, Rhode Island	Warwick, Rhode Island	Co-educational
Sacred Heart School	Diocese of Providence	PK-8	Providence County, Rhode Island	East Providence, Rhode Island	Co-educational
St. Andrew's School	Christian	6-12	Bristol County, Rhode Island	Barrington, Rhode Island	Co-educational
St. Augustine School	Diocese of Providence	PK-8	Providence County, Rhode Island	Providence, Rhode Island	Co-educational
St. Cecilia School	Diocese of Providence	PK-8	Providence County, Rhode Island	Pawtucket, Rhode Island	Co-educational
St. George's School	Episcopalian	9-12	Newport County, Rhode Island	Newport, Rhode Island	Co-educational
St. Joseph School	Diocese of Providence	PK-8	Kent County, Rhode Island	Warwick, Rhode Island	Co-educational
St. Kevin School	Diocese of Providence	PK-8	Kent County, Rhode Island	Warwick, Rhode Island	Co-educational
St. Luke School	Diocese of Providence	PK-8	Bristol County, Rhode Island	Barrington, Rhode Island	Co-educational
St. Margaret School	Diocese of Providence	PK-8	Providence County, Rhode Island	East Providence, Rhode Island	Co-educational
St. Mary Academy - Bay View	Diocese of Providence	PK-12	Providence County, Rhode Island	East Providence, Rhode Island	All-female
St. Mary School	Diocese of Providence	PK-8	Providence County, Rhode Island	Cranston, Rhode Island	Co-educational
St. Patrick Academy	Diocese of Providence	9-12	Providence County, Rhode Island	Providence, Rhode Island	Co-educational
Saint Paul School	Diocese of Providence	PK-8	Providence County, Rhode Island	Cranston, Rhode Island	Co-educational
St. Peter Tri-Parish School	Diocese of Providence	PK-8	Kent County, Rhode Island	Warwick, Rhode Island	Co-educational
St. Philip School	Diocese of Providence	PK-8	Providence County, Rhode Island	Smithfield, Rhode Island	Co-educational
St. Philomena School of the Sacred Heart	Diocese of Providence	PK-8	Newport County, Rhode Island	Portsmouth, Rhode Island	Co-educational
St. Pius V School	Diocese of Providence	PK-8	Providence County, Rhode Island	Providence, Rhode Island	Co-educational
St. Rocco School	Diocese of Providence	PK-8	Providence County, Rhode Island	Johnston, Rhode Island	Co-educational
St. Rose of Lima School	Diocese of Providence	PK-8	Kent County, Rhode Island	Warwick, Rhode Island	Co-educational
St. Raphael Academy	Diocese of Providence	9-12	Providence County, Rhode Island	Pawtucket, Rhode Island	Co-educational
St. Theresa School	Diocese of Providence	PK-8	Providence County, Rhode Island	Pawtucket, Rhode Island	Co-educational
St. Thomas Regional STEAM Academy	Diocese of Providence	PK-8	Providence County, Rhode Island	Providence, Rhode Island	Co-educational
School One	Independent	9-12	Providence County, Rhode Island	Providence, Rhode Island	Co-educational
Trinity Christian Academy	Christian	PK-12	Providence County, Rhode Island	Johnston, Rhode Island	Co-educational
West Bay Christian Academy	Christian	PK-8	Washington County, Rhode Island	North Kingstown, Rhode Island	Co-educational
Wheeler School	Independent	PK-12	Providence County, Rhode Island	Providence, Rhode Island	Co-educational

== See also ==
- Providence County, Rhode Island schools
