= List of high schools in Rhode Island =

This is a complete list of high schools in the U.S. state of Rhode Island.

== Bristol County ==
- Mt. Hope High School, Bristol

=== Barrington ===
- Barrington High School
- Barrington Christian Academy
- St. Andrew's School

== Kent County ==
- Coventry High School, Coventry
- East Greenwich High School, East Greenwich
- West Warwick High School, West Warwick

=== West Greenwich ===
- Exeter-West Greenwich Senior High School
- The Greene School

=== Warwick ===
- Bishop Hendricken High School
- Pilgrim High School
- Rocky Hill School
- Toll Gate High School

== Newport County ==
- Rogers High School, Newport
- Tiverton High School, Tiverton

=== Middletown ===
- Middletown High School
- St. George's School

=== Portsmouth ===
- Portsmouth Abbey School
- Portsmouth High School (also serves Little Compton)

== Providence County ==
- Burrillville High School, Harrisville (a village of Burrillville)
- Central Falls High School, Central Falls
- Cumberland High School, Cumberland
- North Providence High School, North Providence
- North Smithfield High School, North Smithfield
- Ponaganset High School, Glocester
- Scituate High School, North Scituate
- Smithfield High School, Smithfield

=== Cranston ===
- Cranston High School East
- Cranston High School West
- Cranston Area Career and Technical Center

=== East Providence ===
- East Providence Career & Technical Center
- East Providence High School
- Providence Country Day School
- St. Mary Academy – Bay View

=== Johnston ===
- Johnston Senior High School
- Trinity Christian Academy

=== Lincoln ===
- Lincoln Senior High School
- William M. Davies, Jr. Career and Technical High School

=== Pawtucket ===
- Blackstone Academy Charter School
- St. Raphael Academy
- Shea High School
- William E. Tolman High School
- Jacqueline M. Walsh School For The Performing and Visual Arts

=== Providence ===
- Achievement First Providence High School
- Central High School
- Classical High School
- Dr. Jorge Alvarez High School
- Highlander Charter School
- Hope High School
- Juanita Sanchez Educational Complex
- La Salle Academy
- Lincoln School
- Moses Brown School
- Mount Pleasant High School
- New England Academy of Torah
- Paul Cuffee Charter School
- Providence Career and Tech Academy
- Rhode Island School for the Deaf
- Textron Chamber of Commerce Charter School
- St. Patrick Academy
- School One
- Time Squared Academy
- Wheeler School

=== Woonsocket ===
- Beacon Charter High School for the Arts
- Mount Saint Charles Academy
- Woonsocket High School

== Washington County ==
- Block Island School, New Shoreham (Block Island) (K-12)
- Chariho High School, Wood River Junction (a village of Richmond, also serves Charlestown and Hopkinton)
- North Kingstown High School, North Kingstown (also serves Jamestown)
- Westerly High School, Westerly

=== Narragansett ===
- Middlebridge School
- Narragansett High School (also serves Jamestown)

=== South Kingstown ===
- Prout School
- South Kingstown High School

== See also ==
- List of school districts in Rhode Island
- Providence County, Rhode Island schools
- Rhode Island schools
