= List of school districts in Rhode Island =

This is a list of school districts in Rhode Island, sorted alphabetically.

The majority of school districts are controlled by town governments, with some by city governments. As of 2022, the Central Falls School District and Providence School District were directly controlled by the Rhode Island government. There are also regional school districts, and the U.S. Census Bureau only considers those districts to have independent governments.

== Local ==
=== B ===
- Barrington School District
- Burrillville School District

=== C ===
- Central Falls School District
- Chariho Regional School District
- Coventry School District
- Cranston School District
- Cumberland School District

=== E ===
- East Greenwich School District
- East Providence School District

=== G ===
- Glocester Elementary Schools

=== J ===
- Jamestown School District
- Johnston School District

=== L ===
- Lincoln School District
- Little Compton School District

=== M ===
- Middletown School District

=== N ===
- Narragansett School District
- Newport School District
- North Kingstown School District
- North Providence School District
- North Smithfield School District

=== P ===
- Pawtucket School District
- Portsmouth School District
- Providence School District

=== S ===
- Scituate School District
- Smithfield School District
- South Kingstown School District

=== T ===
- Tiverton School District

=== W ===
- Warwick School District
- West Warwick School District
- Westerly School District
- Woonsocket School District

== Regional ==
- Bristol Warren Regional School District
- Chariho Regional School District (serving Charlestown, Hopkinton and Richmond)
- Exeter-West Greenwich Regional School District
- Foster-Glocester Regional School District
