= EGSD =

EGSD may refer to:

- East Greenwich School Department, a public school district located in East Greenwich, Rhode Island
- EGSD, the ICAO code for Great Yarmouth – North Denes Airport, Great Yarmouth, England
