= Mount Hope High School =

Mount Hope High School is the name of high schools in several U.S. states:

- Mt. Hope High School, Bristol, Rhode Island
- Mount Hope High School (West Virginia), Mount Hope, West Virginia
