= Saint Philomena School =

Saint Philomena School or Saint Philomena Catholic School may refer to:

United Kingdom:

- St Philomena's Catholic High School for Girls, London
- St. Philomena's School, Frinton-on-Sea, England
- St Philomena's Primary School, St Mary Cray, Orpington

United States:

- St. Philomena Catholic School, Carson, California (Los Angeles area)
- St. Philomena School, Peoria, Illinois
- Saint Philomena School, Portsmouth, Rhode Island
- St. Philomena Catholic School, Des Moines, Washington
