= Cole Middle School =

Cole Middle School and Cole Junior High School may refer to:

- Gifford C. Cole Middle School, Eastside Union School District, Lancaster, California
- Cole Middle School, DSST Public Schools, Denver, Colorado
- Archie R. Cole Middle School, East Greenwich School Department, East Greenwich, Rhode Island
- Lewis F. Cole Middle School, Fort Lee School District, Fort Lee, New Jersey
- Robert G. Cole Junior-Senior High School, Fort Sam Houston Independent School District, San Antonio, Texas
