= Primrose, Rhode Island =

Village in North Smithfield, Rhode Island, US

Coordinates: 41°57′15″N 71°33′23″W

Primrose is a village in North Smithfield, Rhode Island, United States. The village is located in the area around Greenville Road and Providence Pike. The village derives its name from the Primrose railroad station, which existed on Greenville Road for the Providence and Springfield Railroad, which began service in 1873. The Primrose Fire Department and North Smithfield High School are located in the area. The historic Primrose Grange (1887) building is located on Grange Road as well as several eighteenth-century farms surrounded by stonewalls.

Primrose Station at the turn of the twentieth century

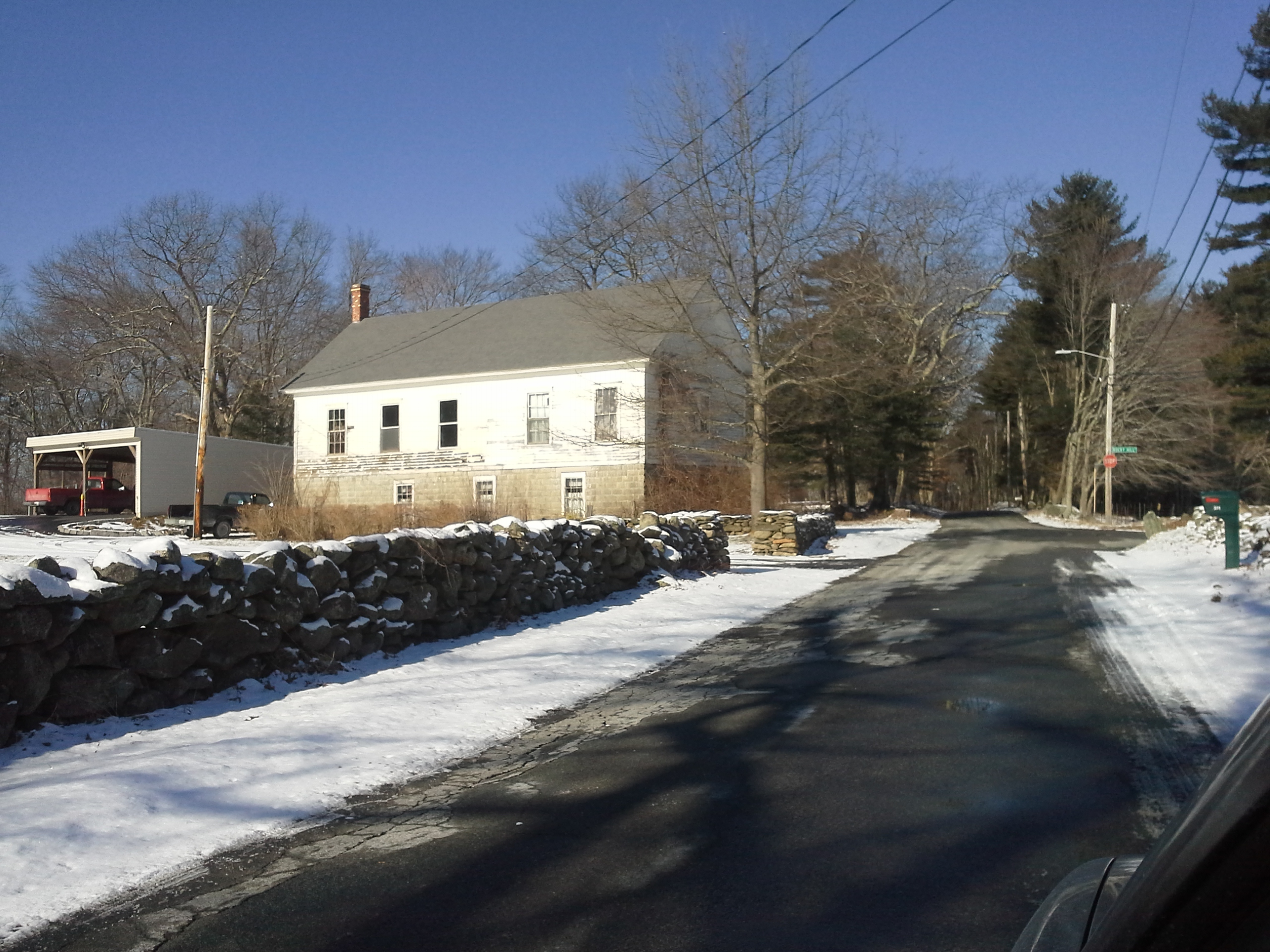
Historic Grange Building (1887) on Grange Road in Primrose near Rocky Hill Road, pictured in 2013

== Geography ==
The geography of Primrose was drastically changed by the Wisconsin glaciation between 70,000 and 10,000 years ago. This glaciation or "Ice Age" created a more rugged terrain, and deposited granite throughout the landscape. As a result of this rugged terrain, this area has many peaks and valleys, which leads to many wetlands. This area is less built up than the other villages in North Smithfield, partly because of the geography, and partly because the area is not part of the mill village of Slatersville.

== Primrose Pond ==
According to a 2010 National Park Service Report:

Primrose Pond is a 64-acre former ice pond at the headwaters of the Woonasquatucket River. It is a long pond north of Farnum Pike (Routes 5, 104) and is bound on the east by Pond House Road and on the west by Black Plain Road. Remnants of a dam, a small viaduct, and a mill trench are located along the southern edge. A saw mill that operated from ca. 1780 to the early 20th century was located on the south end and an ice house built in the early 20th century was located on the western edge. The linear pond is surrounded by privately owned parcels. The pond is also privately owned and only two nonowners have been granted boat access to the pond. There used to be a summer day camp on Pond House Road.
