= North Smithfield High School =

Coordinates: 41.953889°N 71.545009°W

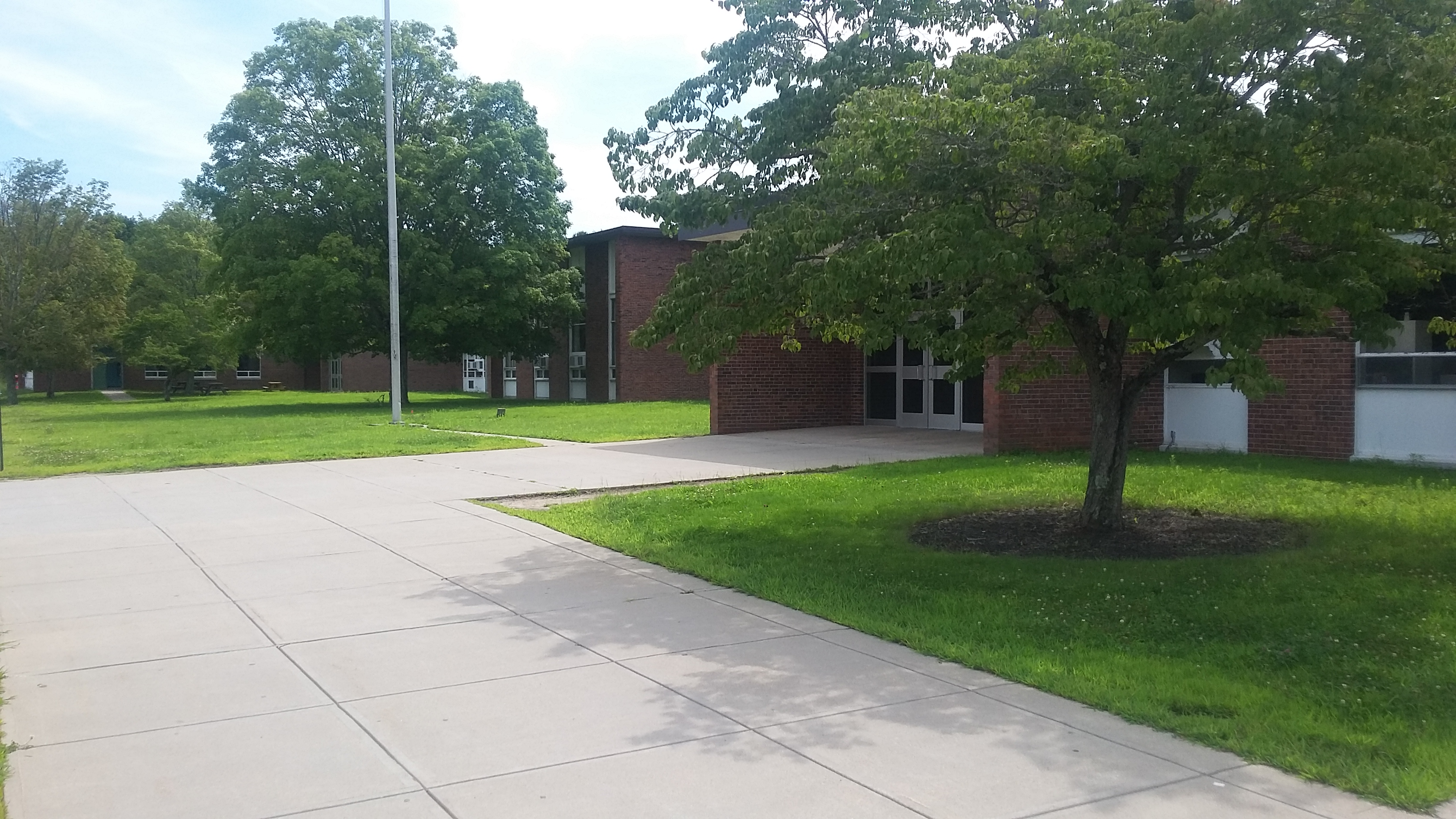
- 412 Greenville Road; North Smithfield, Rhode Island 02896; United States

Information
- School type: Public High School
- Established: 1968
- School district: North Smithfield School District
- Principal: Daniel Geraghty
- Teaching staff: 43.00 (FTE)
- Grades: 9 to 12
- Enrollment: 547 (2023-2024)
- Student to teacher ratio: 12.72
- Colors: Green and Gold
- Sports: Yes
- Mascot: Northmen
- Nickname: Northmen
- Team name: Northmen
- Rival: Smithfield
- Website: NSHS website

North Smithfield High School (known previously as North Smithfield Junior-Senior High School) is a high school in the Primrose section of North Smithfield, Rhode Island, USA (in Providence County). It is the only public high school in the town and was ranked 12th out of 51 public high schools in Rhode Island in 2022. As of September of 2025, the current principal is Daniel Geraghty.

== History ==
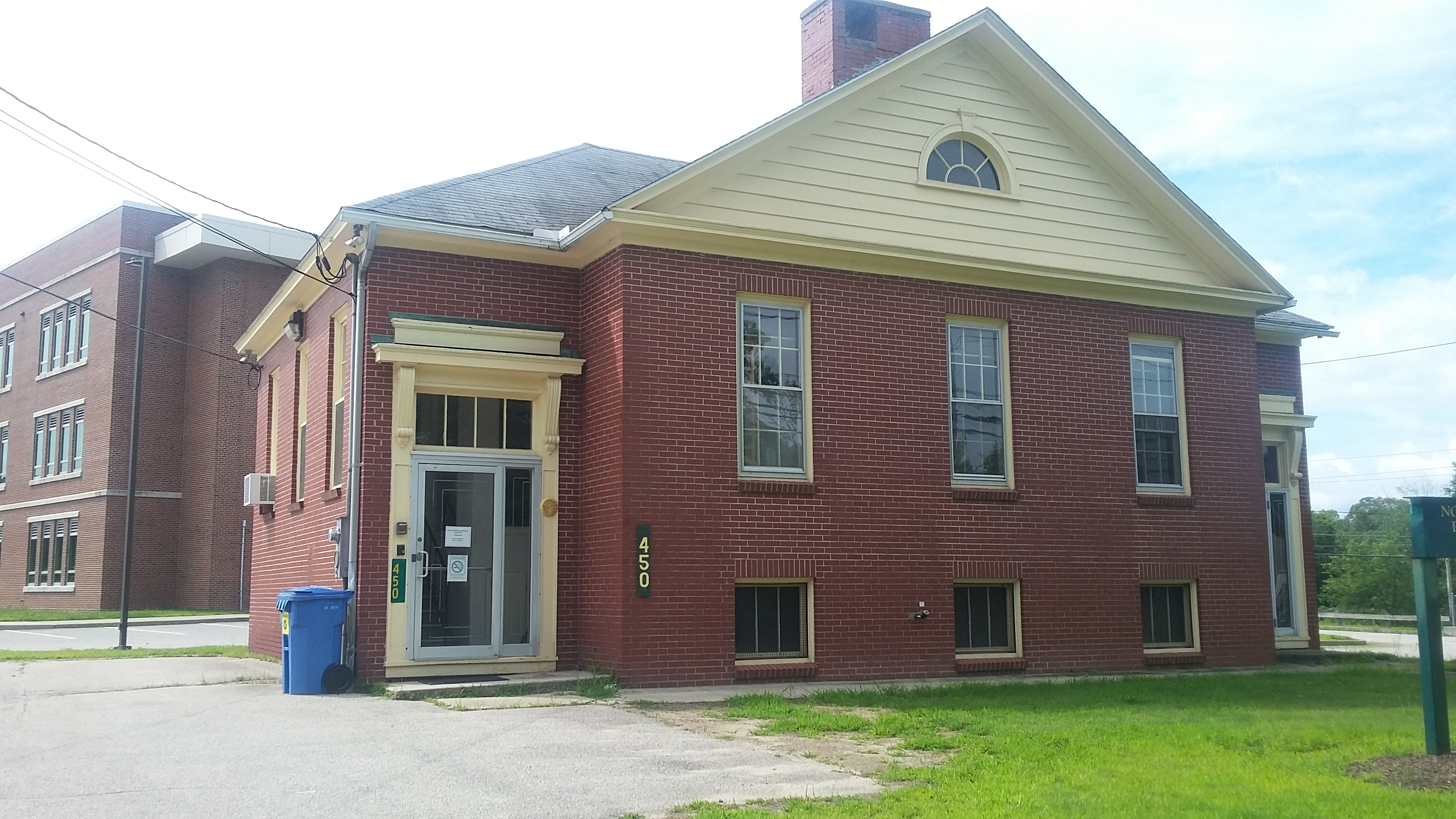
Near the high school is the North Smithfield School Administration building ("Andrews Building") with NS RI Middle School in background. The administration building was built near the former site of a former wooden school house and was originally called the Andrews School. It served as a school prior to the opening of the high school in 1966.

The current high school was constructed in 1966 although local students had received private high school level instruction within the town since colonial times. During the American Revolution (1775–1783), one of North Smithfield's first recorded schools was founded in the home of Elisha Thornton near modern-day Slatersville. In the 1800s many local students attended the private Bushee Academy (Smithfield Union Village Academy) in Union Village. The first school building located near the present high school in Primrose, Rhode Island was known as the "Andrews School," originally a one-room wooden school house, first constructed in 1838. The wooden building was replaced by a larger brick building in the early twentieth century, which currently serves as the North Smithfield School District's Business office. Prior to the completion of the 1966 school, North Smithfield students often attended "Woonsocket and Blackstone high schools locally or went to Moses Brown, Classical High School, or Technical High School in Providence" Currently the high school graduates around 150 students per year. Prior to the 2009-2010 school year North Smithfield High School was a JR/SR high school, holding grades 7-12; this was prior to completion of the North Smithfield Middle School, constructed adjacent to the high school to provide students in grades 6-8 with their own facility.

== Demographics ==
North Smithfield High school has a very small student body, at just 522 students overall, with 118 in their freshman year, 122 sophomores, 141 juniors, and 141 seniors. They have 31 faculty members in total, with a student teacher ratio of 17 students to 1 teacher. The graduation rate there is 92 percent, with 36 percent of the students enrolled in advanced placement courses, in which 76 percent of the students pass the final test. There are 45 percent females and 55 percent males enrolled in the system, with 9 percent of the students enrolled at NSHS are minorities. 91 percent of all students enrolled are white, making it a majority white school, 5 percent Hispanic, 2 percent Asian, and 0.2 percent black. Another 2 percent of students are of 2 or more races combined. 7 percent of the students enrolled get free lunch, and 3 percent get reduced lunch.

== Athletics ==
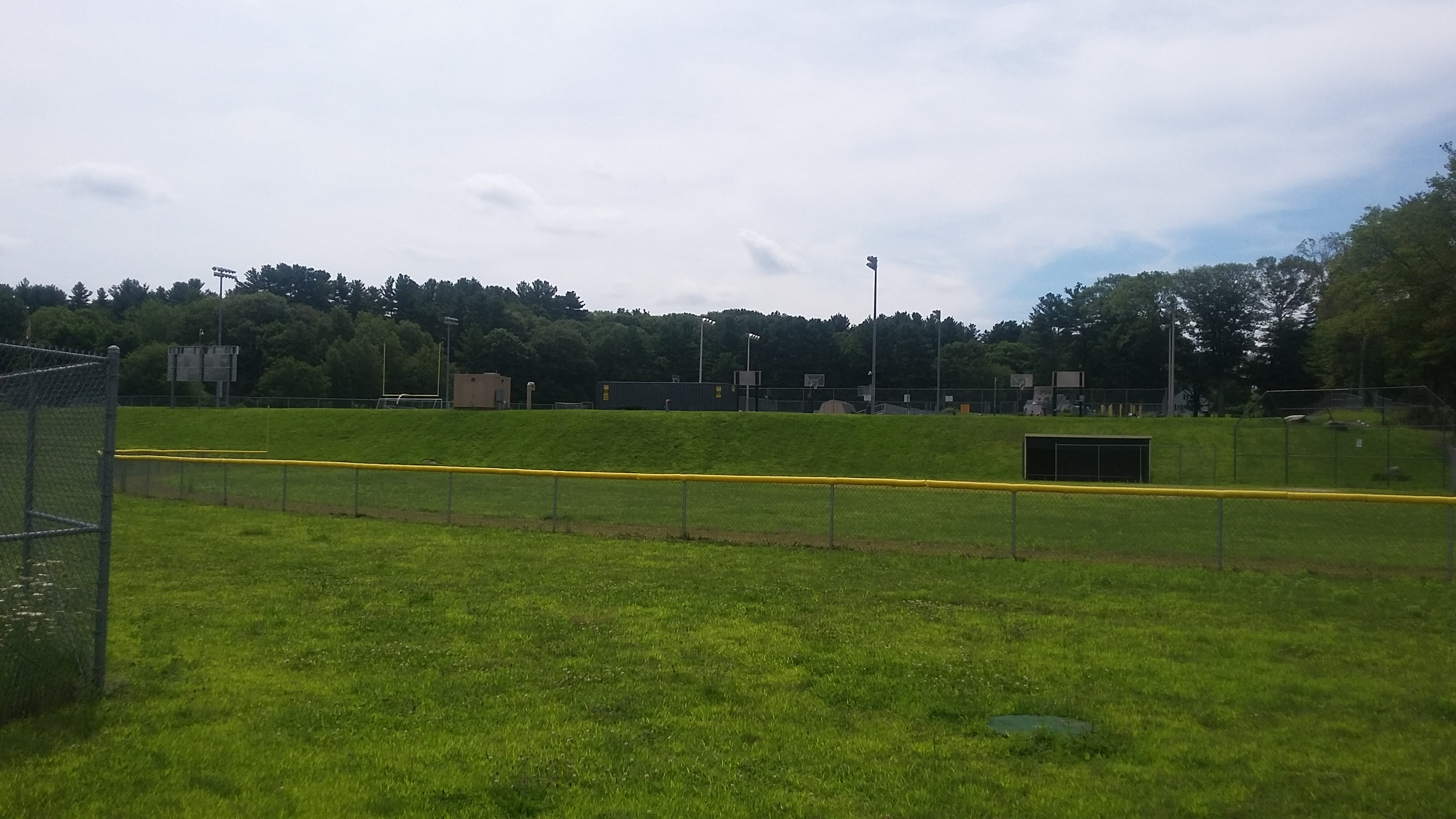
North Smithfield High School athletic fields

North Smithfield High School's mascot are the Northmen, and its colors are green and gold. The high school athletes compete in the Rhode Island Interscholastic League (RIIL) in which most of Rhode Island's public and private schools compete. As a smaller public school, the school competes in the lower divisions for each sport, including Division IV for football and Division III for many other sports. The most successful teams include the Boys' Soccer team from the years 2008-2012. The town has various sporting facilities, including a new all-weather turf football/soccer field, a baseball field, a gymnasium for basketball all on the school's grounds, and several tennis courts located on the east side.

=== Hazing allegations ===
During the 2021 football season, allegations against the team were released about numerous hazing incidents. All activities involving the sports team were put on hold until the investigations was finished. Since there was no physical evidence and just allegations, no one was formally charged, but the investigation remained open and the team was reinstated to play for the 2022 season.

== Notable Extra-Curricular Events ==
The NSHS band won first place at the 2018 Berklee Festival in Jazz. This marked the band's 3rd time placing first at the festival.

== Notable alumni ==
- Drew Inzer, Patriots Super Bowl team member 2001
- Linda Cimino, college basketball coach

== See also ==
List of high schools in Rhode Island
