= Chariho High School =

School in Rhode Island, United States

Coordinates: 41.450°N 71.696°W

- 453 Switch Road; Wood River Junction, Rhode Island 02894; United States

Information
- School district: Chariho Regional School District
- Superintendent: Gina Picard
- Principal: Andrea Spas
- Grades: 9–12
- Enrollment: 1,012 (2023-2024)
- Team name: Chargers
- Newspaper: The Chariho Charger
- Website: http://www.chariho.k12.ri.us/chs

Chariho High School is a public high school located in the rural village of Wood River Junction, Rhode Island, in the town of Richmond. It is part of the Chariho Regional School District, serving the towns of Charlestown, Richmond, and Hopkinton. The name Chariho is derived from the first syllable of the three towns' names.

== History ==
Chariho High School was founded in 1960.

The geographic area served by the school, 126 square miles, is the largest in the state. The three towns comprising the district passed shared legislation, The Chariho Act, which governs the school's funding by taxation proportional to each town's student enrollment.

== Academics ==
In U.S. News & World Report's national high school rankings, Chariho High School was awarded a bronze medal overall with a College Readiness Index of 15.5. 93% of students achieved proficiency in Reading and 53% in Math as determined by the New England Common Assessment Program and reported by U.S. News & World Report.

=== Career and Technical Center ===
The school's Marine Technology Center received one of the first endorsements by the American Boat and Yacht Council ("ABYC") in 2005. Through curriculum developed as a collaboration between the ABYC and the Rhode Island Association of Career and Technical Center Directors, interested students learn about boat design, construction, repair, safety, navigation, and other marine trades. Students who complete the required coursework receive an ABYC certificate.

== Athletics ==
The Chariho High School Chargers teams have won titles in baseball, football, lacrosse, track and field, soccer, wrestling, and volleyball.

== Student life policies ==
The district has set several policies on the nutritional value of school lunches and food available on the premises. A 2006 policy barred all unhealthy snacks and drinks during the school day along with several specific regulations, according to a Rhode Island Department of Health press release.

In June 2014 the parent of a student challenged a school policy that permits transgender students to use the bathroom of the gender they identify with. Superintendent Barry Ricci responded by citing Rhode Island law against discrimination based on gender identity and by creating a single unisex bathroom for anyone who may feel uncomfortable.

== Notable alumni ==
- Eric Lutes (b. 1962), actor known for his role in Caroline in the City
- V. Susan Sosnowski (b. 1955), Democratic Party member of the Rhode Island Senate, representing the 37th District
