= Elizabeth Dickens (ornithologist) =

American ornithologist

Elizabeth Dickens, known as the "Bird Lady of Block Island", (2 December 1877 – 17 June 1963) was an American ornithologist.

== Early life ==
Dickens was born and lived her entire life on Block Island, Rhode Island. She was an eighth generation descendant of Nathaniel Dickens (1614-1692), an early settler of Block Island who arrived from the mainland in 1679. She was the last member of that family line to reside there, and she traveled only occasionally and then usually for reasons connected to her interest and expertise about birds.

== Scientific contributions ==
Dickens contributed to the annals of ornithology through her half-century of daily bird sightings on Block Island. These journals, which she began in 1912, were bequeathed by Dickens to the Audubon Society of Rhode Island and are housed at their offices in Smithfield, Rhode Island.

In addition to her journals, she also accumulated a taxidermy collection of 172 mounted specimens representing many of the island's bird species. The Block Island School is today the home of the Elizabeth Dickens Bird Collection.

The Dickens-Lewis Farm Nature Preserve on Block Island, named for Elizabeth Dickens, preserves farming history on 200 acres of meadows that also provide habitat for grassland birds. Roland Clement, in a 1959 Yankee Magazine article about Elizabeth Dickens, coined the title “Bird Lady of Block Island” for Miss Dickens. Her biography was written by Herbert S. Whitman.
