= Woonsocket High School =

Public school in Rhode Island, US

Location
- 777 Cass Avenue, Woonsocket, Rhode Island 02895; United States
- Coordinates: 42.0041°N 71.4858°W

Information
- Type: Public
- School district: Woonsocket School District
- Principal: Brian Ernest
- Staff: 101.00 (FTE)
- Grades: 9 to 12
- Enrollment: 1,599 (2023-2024)
- Student to teacher ratio: 15.83
- Colors: Maroon and white
- Nickname: Villa Novans
- Website: WHS website

Woonsocket High School is a high school in Woonsocket, Rhode Island, United States (in Providence County). It is the only public high school in the city. Manufacturer and abolitionist Edward Harris donated the original land for the public high school.

== Demographics ==
From grades 9 through 12 at the Woonsocket high school there were 1556 students, 52% of whom were male, and 48% female. The teacher to student ratio was 20:1.

1% of the students were American Indian, 7% were Asian, 10% were Black, 0.3% were Hawaiian, 29% were Hispanic, 48% were white, and 5% of the students were of two or more races.

60% of students had economic disadvantages, 53% of students were currently receiving free lunch, and 6% received reduced lunch.

== Advanced placement testing ==
14% of students participated in Advanced Placement testing, and of those, 22% passed. The percentage of disadvantaged students who are proficient in testing was 10.9%. Out of the students who did not have a disadvantage, 22.7% were proficient in testing.

== Sports ==
Woonsocket High School's sports teams are known as the Villa Novans, and its colors are maroon and white. The school offers baseball, basketball, football, ice hockey, soccer, volleyball, and wrestling for boys; and basketball, field hockey, soccer, softball, and volleyball for girls. The high school athletes compete in the Rhode Island Interscholastic League (RIIL), in which most of Rhode Island's public and private schools compete. The city has various sporting facilities, including a football/soccer field, a baseball field, a gymnasium for basketball, and several tennis courts.

== Notable alumni ==
- Adin B. Capron (1859), United States House of Representatives member from 1897 until 1911
- Anne Bosworth Focke (1886), mathematician
- Frank W. Buxton (1896), Pulitzer Prize winning journalist
- Domina Jalbert (1922), inventor of the ram-air inflated flexible wing
- Paul T. Carroll (1928), United States Army Brigadier General and White House Staff Secretary to President Dwight D. Eisenhower
- Eileen Farrell (1939), opera singer
- Jeffrey Mailhot (1988), serial killer known as The Rhode Island Ripper
- Tarik Robinson-O'Hagan (2022), track and field athlete

== See also ==
- List of high schools in Rhode Island
