= Barrington Public Schools =

School district in Camden County, New Jersey, US

Address
- 311 Reading Avenue Barrington, Camden County, 08007; United States
- Coordinates: 39.871839°N 75.055043°W

District information
- Grades: PreK to 8
- Superintendent: Anthony Arcodia
- Business administrator: Samuel L. Dutkin
- Schools: 2

Students and staff
- Enrollment: 567 (as of 2020–21)
- Faculty: 60.8 FTEs
- Student–teacher ratio: 9.3:1

Other information
- District Factor Group: FG
- Website: www.barringtonschools.net
Ind.	Per pupil	District spending	Rank (*)	K-8 average	%± vs. average
1A	Total Spending	$15,455	5	$18,891	−18.2%
1	Budgetary Cost	12,487	15	14,159	−11.8%
2	Classroom Instruction	7,719	13	8,659	−10.9%
6	Support Services	1,903	19	2,167	−12.2%
8	Administrative Cost	1,364	8	1,547	−11.8%
10	Operations & Maintenance	1,452	22	1,612	−9.9%
13	Extracurricular Activities	49	11	104	−52.9%
16	Median Teacher Salary	58,246	25	61,136
Data from NJDoE 2014 Taxpayers' Guide to Education Spending. *Of K-8 districts with 401–750 students. Lowest spending=1; Highest=64

The Barrington Public Schools are a community public school district that serves students in pre-kindergarten through eighth grade from Barrington, in Camden County, in the U.S. state of New Jersey.

As of the 2020–21 school year, the district, comprising two schools, had an enrollment of 567 students and 60.8 classroom teachers (on an FTE basis), for a student–teacher ratio of 9.3:1.

The district is classified by the New Jersey Department of Education as being in District Factor Group "FG", the fourth-highest of eight groupings. District Factor Groups organize districts statewide to allow comparison by common socioeconomic characteristics of the local districts. From the lowest socioeconomic status to the highest, the categories are A, B, CD, DE, FG, GH, I and J.

For ninth through twelfth grades, public school students attend Haddon Heights Junior/Senior High School, which serves Haddon Heights, and students from Barrington, Lawnside and Merchantville who attend the high school as part of sending/receiving relationships with the Haddon Heights School District. The Haddon Heights district approved a contract in September 2013 with the Merchantville School District that would add about 80 students a year from Merchantville to the high school, in addition to the average of more than 260 students from Barrington and 120 from Lawnside that are sent to Haddon Heights each year. As of the 2020–21 school year, the high school had an enrollment of 997 students and 82.0 classroom teachers (on an FTE basis), for a student–teacher ratio of 12.2:1.

== History ==
Culbertson School, one of Barrington's two earliest school facilities, built in 1917, was closed in 1985.

== Schools ==
Schools in the district (with 2020–21 enrollment data from the National Center for Education Statistics) are:

- Avon Elementary School with 312 students in grades PreK-4
  - Anthony Arcodia, principal
- Woodland Middle School with 251 students in grades 5 through 8
  - Michael Silvestri, principal

== Administration ==
Core members of the district's administration are:

- Anthony Arcodia, superintendent
- Samuel Dutkin, business administrator and board secretary

== Board of education ==
The district's board of education is comprised of nine members who set policy and oversee the fiscal and educational operation of the district through its administration. As a Type II school district, the board's trustees are elected directly by voters to serve three-year terms of office on a staggered basis, with three seats up for election each year held (since 2012) as part of the November general election. The board appoints a superintendent to oversee the district's day-to-day operations and a business administrator to supervise the business functions of the district.
