= Blackstone Academy Charter School =

Coordinates: 41°52′08.58″N 71°23′05.22″W

Location
- 334 Pleasant Street; Pawtucket, Rhode Island 02860; United States

Information
- School type: Public Charter high school
- Motto: "A community of learners."
- Founded: 2002
- School district: Independent Local Education Agency
- Director: Carolyn Sheehan
- Principal: Kyleen Carpenter
- Teaching staff: 19.90 (on an FTE basis)
- Grades: 9–12
- Enrollment: 247 (2015–16)
- Student to teacher ratio: 12.41
- Language: English
- Colors: White and Black
- Mascot: Bulldog
- Communities served: Pawtucket, Providence and Central Falls
- Website: www.blackstoneacademy.org

Blackstone Academy Charter School, commonly known as Blackstone Academy or BACS, is an American secondary, independent day school in Pawtucket, Rhode Island. The school is recognized by the state for its academic results and uses a lottery system to admit students into the school. The school is also known for its work in promoting diversity, inclusiveness in its curriculum and school wide events and policies.

== History ==
Blackstone Academy Charter School hosts a high school and affiliated programs including a summer long Summer Program hosted at several schools including The Wheeler School, Moses Brown School among others. The high school serves students from Pawtucket, Central Falls, and Providence.

The school was founded in 2002 by teachers and leaders from the SPIRIT Educational Program, an educational enrichment program for students from Providence, Pawtucket and Central Falls.

== Governance ==
BACS is an independent charter school that is an incorporated, private non-profit 501(c)3 organization governed by a Board of Directors. This board of directors reports directly to the Rhode Island Department of Elementary and Secondary Education (RIDE) and is empowered in ways similar to a school committee. Blackstone Academy Inc. is a Local education agency (LEA) and has no formal affiliation with local school districts.

== Demographics ==
For 2015–16 the total enrollment was 247 students.

- Hispanic: 62.3%
- Black: 18.2%
- White: 13.4%
- Two or more races: 4.9%
- Asian: 1.2%
- Native American/Alaskan: 0.4%

54% of the student population was eligible for free or reduced price lunch programs.

== Athletics ==
Blackstone Academy does not participate in interscholastic sports programs. Students may join teams from the high schools they would have attended had they not attended BACS. Students may also organize intramural teams.

The physical education program at the school includes such nontraditional sports as rock climbing, sailing, and yoga. Students participating in outside sports, including teams at other high schools, may make arrangements to use this participation in lieu of the BACS physical education class,

== College enrollment and external learning ==
Blackstone Academy has promoted external learning as a key component and sometimes a requirement for grade progression. Summer learning is one that is very popular among students with Blackstone offering a Summer Math Academy which offers qualified students to complete math topics through during the summer through classes and tutoring. Students are also heavily involved in Pre College Programs at various universities including Brown University, Amherst College, University of Michigan, and Bryant University. Blackstone students in the past and recent years have enrolled successfully and been accepted, often at some of the nations most selective schools including Brown University, Smith College, Mount Holyoke College, Harvard University, Wheaton College MA, Boston University, New York University. Students also heavily matriculate at the University of Rhode Island, Rhode Island College, and Community College of Rhode Island.

== Community Leadership in Nonviolence and Substance Use Prevention ==
In January 2022, Project Weber/ RENEW taught a Community Leadership in Nonviolence and Substance Use Prevention class for students at Blackstone Academy Charter School, in partnership with U.S. Attorney Zachary A. Cunha, Local Initiatives Support Corporation Rhode Island, and the Nonviolence Institute. The course ran for twenty weeks.
