= Warren A. Sherman Elementary School =

Coordinates: 41.718115°N 71.396286°W

- 120 Killey Ave, Warwick, Rhode Island 02889; United States

Information
- Type: Public Primary school
- Motto: Respect, Responsibility, Readiness
- Established: 1953
- School district: Warwick, Rhode Island
- Superintendent: Richard D'Agostino
- Principal: Ms. SanMartino
- Grades: K–5
- Enrollment: about 310 (as of 2022)
- Colors: Blue, White, Gray
- Mascot: Sammy the Shark
- Website: www.warwickschools.org/sherman/default.htm

Warren A. Sherman Elementary School is a public elementary school in Warwick, Rhode Island.This school is a Feinstein Leadership School. The school's principal is Ms. SanMartino, and secretary is Kathryn Wickham. Sherman educates students grade K-5.

== Mission statement ==
The mission of Sherman School in partnership along with community staff and the students' parents to increase Sherman students' skills and education necessary to create enduring learners who will be productive, responsible citizens in a culturally diverse institute. The Sherman students will be respectful, responsible, and ready to learn each and every day.

== History ==
Warren A. Sherman school is an elementary school grades K-5. Sherman School was built in 1953 and opened in September 1954. It was named after Warren A. Sherman, who was the first Superintendent of Warwick Schools from 1930-1949. Every year, members of his family attended the ceremonial dedication on Tuesday, November 16, 1954. When Sherman School was scheduled to open in 1954, it was announced that there would not be enough space for all of the neighborhood children to attend. Other buildings in the community would be used as schools for the excess students. Sherman School opened with an average of 35 students per class. Now there is currently mainly 23 students per class. Currently, there is about 310 students participating as students.

== Other Activities ==
- Mad Science Club
- Lego Club
- Fuel Up Play 60
- Yearbook Club
- ALAP (temporarily gone from staff list)

== PTO ==
Also known as, "'Parent-Teacher Organization; are everywhere and almost in every elementary, or primary school. They work with students' parents to resolve problems for students and raise money for field trips.

They also hold fundraisers and to help other people in the world.

== Fundraising ==
The PTO does many fundraising to help the world. Warren A. Sherman Elementary School is a Feinstein Leadership School.

Here are just a few fundraisers each year:

- Color Run
- Penny War is only for fifth grade, which they bring in several pennies and fill up a jar to fund their end of year.
- Trunk or Treat

== Sources ==
- www.warwickschools.org/sherman/default.htm
- www.schnet.ncpe.uri.edu/data/800/25361/08/sf-a-wp-10.PDF
