= Barrington Christian Academy =

Location
- 9 Old County Road; Barrington, Rhode Island 02806; United States; 41°45′20.89″N 71°19′39.12″W

Information
- Type: Christian private school
- Teaching staff: 28.1 (on an FTE basis)
- Grades: K-12
- Enrollment: 188 (2017-18)
- Student to teacher ratio: 6.7
- Website: www.bcacademy.org

== Overview ==
Barrington Christian Academy (BCA) is private Christian school in Barrington, Rhode Island, United States. The Barrington Christian Academy is accredited by the Association of Christian Schools International (ACSI) and the New England Association of Schools & Colleges.

=== History ===
The school began in the 1979–1980 school year, founded by the neighboring Barrington Baptist Church, and began with grades K-8. From 1984 to 1986, the school incorporated a high school. However due to budget issues, the high school was discontinued, leaving the school with grades K-8. At the beginning of the 2005 school year, the BCA board began to discuss the possibility of re-establishing the high school. The following year, a freshman class of eleven students enrolled. Since then, the high school has grown and operated with around 50 students as of the 2025-2026 school year.

Presently, the high school has been established for over 8 years.

During the 2007–2008 school year, the building underwent major construction to add an addition primarily for high school classes, as well as to provide enhanced teacher workspaces and a counseling office. The addition includes four classrooms, a science lab, a conference room, a music room, and a new library for the entire school to enjoy.

== Academical studies ==
=== Athletics ===
Elementary students are offered intramural sports, including soccer, basketball, and athletics, during the designated season. Every student who wants to be on the team can be, except those on athletic probation for grades. With the exception of track, the sport is split into an A-team and a B-team, with the A-team players having the higher level of skill. The teams compete with other private schools throughout Rhode Island.

As the high school grew, more and more sports were offered. In the first year of high school, track and girls' basketball were offered. The girls' basketball team consisted only of freshmen, but it had a winning season under coach Sandra Boutcher. The second year, track, girls' basketball, and boys' basketball were offered. In the fall of 2008, a Co-Ed Soccer team was added to the high school program. Girls' volleyball was added at the middle school level in 2024, and a high school team was formed in 2025.

=== The arts ===
==== Visual arts ====
Because the high school is new, students can help shape the arts curriculum according to their own interests and passions. In the 2007–2008 school year, sophomores spent a quarter drawing, then chose between acrylic painting and drama for the following two quarters. After their mission trip to Mendenhall, Mississippi at the beginning of the fourth quarter, sophomores prepared a presentation that encapsulated their experience using talents ranging from mime to cross-stitch. Freshmen spent the first two quarters in drama. For the third quarter, they were allowed to choose between computer design and drama, and the fourth quarter was used as an introduction to the visual arts. The high school had its first real art show at the end of May 2008, where nearly 150 pieces were displayed, and each student was represented. In the future, the school hopes to offer courses in sculpture, ceramics, watercolor, pastel, and more.

=== Performing arts ===
A large part of school is the performing arts. Each year, a Christmas play is produced, for which students in grades 1-5 and 6-12 audition for parts.

== Transportation ==
Public school bus transportation is provided to Barrington Christian Academy for students who live in Barrington, Warren, Bristol, East Providence, Providence, Lincoln, Cranston, Pawtucket, and Johnston, Rhode Island. The bus services mostly consist of Minibusses. There are also multiple vans used for transport.

== Scrip program ==
Barrington Christian Academy participated in a scrip program that allowed families to purchase gift cards for well-known vendors. In return for the business, the vendors donate a certain percentage of the money to the school. The school has used this money to get new playground equipment. For a listing of the vendors and the percentage of money that is donated, please see the family order form. As of 2025, this program has been discontinued.
