= Smithfield High School (Rhode Island) =

Location
- 90 Pleasant View Avenue; Smithfield, Rhode Island 02828; United States; 41.8806°N 71.5445°W

Information
- Type: Public
- Established: 1966
- School district: Smithfield School District
- Teaching staff: 63.00 (on an FTE basis)
- Grades: 9 to 12
- Enrollment: 750 (2023–2024)
- Student to teacher ratio: 11.90
- Colors: Green and Gold
- Mascot: Sentinel
- Website: SHS website

Smithfield High School is a public high school located in the Apple Valley section of Smithfield, Rhode Island, near Greenville, Rhode Island, USA (in Providence County). The school, which opened in 1966, was designed by architect Joseph M. Mosher. Prior to its opening, Smithfield students generally attended high schools in Providence or North Providence. It is the only public high school in the Town of Smithfield. High School graduation ceremonies are typically held at nearby Bryant University, but more recently at the nearby sports complex and playground, Deerfield Park. In 2006, the school was ranked 17th out of 52 high schools in Rhode Island.

== Athletics ==
Smithfield High School's mascot is the Sentinel, and its school colors are green and gold. The school's athletic teams compete in the Rhode Island Interscholastic League, which includes most public and private high schools in the state.

=== 2025 hazing and antisemitic incident in football program ===
On September 30, 2025, five senior members of the Smithfield High School football team were accused of hazing a Jewish freshman teammate. According to reports, the older players allegedly locked the student in a locker-room bathroom, sprayed Lysol through a vent in the door, and shouted antisemitic slurs.

An initial school investigation found “inappropriate conduct,” and the players were suspended for the remainder of the season. However, on or around October 22, the students were reinstated. Superintendent Dawn Bartz stated that the “disciplinary process has concluded” and that the district would not discuss student-specific outcomes.

The reinstatement drew criticism from the Jewish Alliance of Greater Rhode Island and the Sandra Bornstein Holocaust Education Center, which held a joint press conference calling for transparency, a formal apology, and mandatory anti-bias education for students and staff.

On November 5, 2025, the Smithfield School Committee placed Superintendent Bartz on paid administrative leave and hired the law firm Brennan, Scungio & Kresge to conduct an external review of the district’s handling of the incident. The Rhode Island Attorney General’s Office also opened a civil rights review, requesting district records including communication logs, policies, and investigative documentation, with a production deadline of November 13, 2025.

Town Manager Robert Seltzer issued a public statement affirming that the town “does not condone antisemitism or any form of discrimination.”

== See also ==
- List of high schools in Rhode Island
