= Portsmouth School Department =

School district in Rhode Island, US

Address
- 29 Middle Road Portsmouth, Rhode Island, 02871; United States

District information
- Type: Public
- Grades: Pre-K through 12
- Superintendent: Elizabeth L. Viveiros, Ed.D.
- School board: 7 members
- Chair of the board: Emily Copeland
- Schools: 4

Other information
- Website: www.portsmouthschoolsri.org

The Portsmouth School Department is a school district in Portsmouth, Rhode Island, United States.

== Administration ==
The superintendent is Elizabeth Viveiros, who was appointed Superintendent of the Portsmouth School Department in July 2025, after serving as Deputy Superintendent since June 2020.

=== School Committee ===
There are seven members of the Portsmouth School Committee. All members of the Committee are elected.

- Emily Copeland, Chair
- Frederick Faerber III, Vice Chair
- Karen McDaid, Clerk
- Jack Delehanty
- Brett Fox
- Isabelle Kelly
- Emily Skeehan

== Schools ==
- Portsmouth High School
- Portsmouth Middle School
- Howard Hathaway Elementary School
- Melville Elementary School
