= Beacon Charter High School for the Arts =

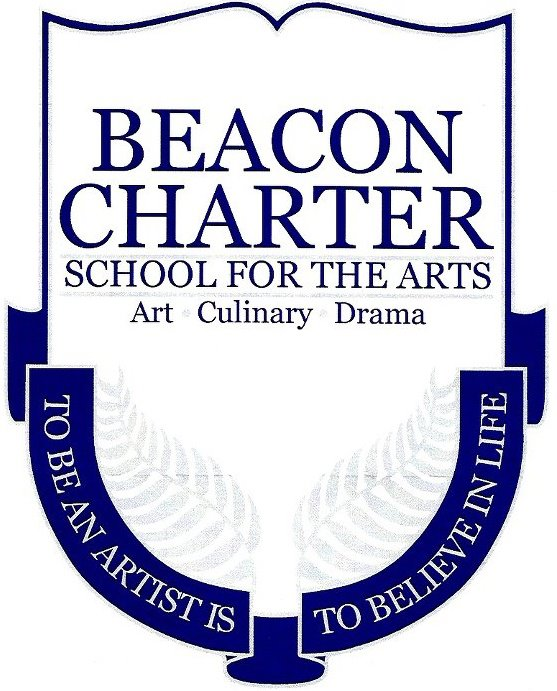
Beacon Charter High School for the Arts
- United States

Information
- Type: Public secondary charter school
- Established: 1997
- Principal: Robin Murphy
- Grades: 9–12
- Enrollment: 340
- Colors: Indigo & Cloud-Color
- Mascot: Dictionary
- Nickname: "Beacon"

Beacon Charter High School for the Arts is a charter high school in Woonsocket, Rhode Island that first opened in 1997.

It combines a high school college preparatory program with a visual, performing, and culinary arts. In September 2015, Beacon opened Founders Academy, serving grades 6–8.
