= North Kingstown School Department =

School district in Rhode Island, United States

Coordinates: 41.56280°N 71.45021°W

Address
- 100 Romano Vineyard Way, Suite 120 North Kingston, Washington County, Rhode Island, 02852; United States

District information
- Type: Public
- Grades: Pre-K through 12
- Superintendent: Kenneth Duva
- School board: 5 members
- Chair of the board: Erin Earle
- Governing agency: Rhode Island Department of Education
- Schools: 9
- NCES District ID: 4400750

Students and staff
- Students: 3842 (2022–23)
- Teachers: 308.29 (on an FTE basis)
- Student–teacher ratio: 12.46

Other information
- Website: www.nksd.net

The North Kingstown School Department is a school district in the U.S. state of Rhode Island. It operates five elementary schools, two middle schools, one high school, and one specialty school in North Kingstown.

== Administration ==
=== Superintendent ===
Kenneth Duva, is the district’s superintendent.

=== School Committee ===
There are five members of the North Kingstown School Committee:

- Erin Earle, Chairperson
- Robert Case, Vice Chairperson
- Jennifer Hoskins
- Jennifer Lima
- Thomas Briody

== Schools ==
There are a total of 9 schools in the North Kingstown School Department:

=== Elementary schools ===
- Fishing Cove Elementary School (Preschool-5)
- Forest Park Elementary School (K-5)
- Hamilton Elementary School (K-5)
- Quidnessett Elementary School (K-5)
- Stony Lane Elementary School (K-5)

=== Middle schools ===
- Davisville Middle School (6-8)
- Wickford Middle School (6-8)

=== High school ===
- North Kingstown High School (9-12)

=== Specialty School ===
- Davisville Academy (K-12)

=== Closed Schools ===
- Wickford Elementary School (closed in 2004)
