= Block Island School =

Public K–12 school in New Shoreham, Rhode Island

Location
- 15 High Street; New Shoreham, Rhode Island 02807; United States

Information
- Type: Public K–12 school
- Established: 1933
- School district: New Shoreham School District
- Superintendent: John Martin
- Principal: Pam Austen
- Teaching staff: 21.00 FTE
- Grades: K–12
- Enrollment: 126 (2024–25)
- Student to teacher ratio: 6.00
- Athletics conference: Rhode Island Interscholastic League
- Nickname: Hurricanes
- Website: www.bischool.net

Block Island School is a public K–12 school on Block Island in the town of New Shoreham, Rhode Island. It is the town's only public school and the sole school in the New Shoreham School District. The present school was built on High Street in 1933, replacing five one-room district schools. The National Center for Education Statistics reported 126 students and 21.00 full-time-equivalent classroom teachers in 2024–25.

Public education on the island predates the present institution. An Island High School opened in 1875, and federal records document state-approved secondary programs on Block Island by 1914 and under the name New Shoreham High School by 1921. The school's small enrollment and offshore setting shape its academic and athletic programs, while a natural-history education tradition dates to Elizabeth Dickens's bird-study lessons beginning in 1911.

== History ==
Public education on Block Island was organized into five school districts by at least 1857. The same five districts remained in operation when local historian Samuel Truesdale Livermore published his history of the island in 1877. Newer schoolhouses had recently replaced older buildings on the Neck and West Side, including a West Side schoolhouse completed in fall 1876. Several buildings associated with the district system survived after consolidation. A town architectural inventory identifies the Centre School on Center Road, built as a one-room schoolhouse in 1877, and School No. 3 on Payne Road, also known as the Gully or George Enos Gully School. Both were later converted into residences.

Secondary education on the island also predates the present school. In 1874, New Shoreham made the town hall available for an advanced school. After voters declined a municipal appropriation the following year, Arthur W. Brown secured financial guarantees from residents and opened the Island High School in the town hall on November 29, 1875. Ten pupils entered at the beginning of its first term, and enrollment increased to sixteen before the term ended. By February 1877, the school had completed six terms; Kate L. Backus had joined during the second term to teach vocal and instrumental music.

Federal compilations of accredited secondary schools later listed a Block Island high-school program among those approved by Rhode Island. A 1915 bulletin listed “Block Island—High School” among schools approved in June 1914, and a 1922 bulletin listed “Block Island—New Shoreham High School” among state-approved schools for 1920–21. The records establish that approved secondary education existed before 1933, but do not demonstrate continuous administration between the Island High School opened in 1875, the later approved programs and the present consolidated school.

In 1911, Block Island naturalist Elizabeth Dickens began giving monthly Bird Study lessons to children in the district schools. She continued teaching island schoolchildren until 1960, spanning both the district-school period and the consolidated-school era. Her collection eventually comprised 172 mounted bird specimens gathered over more than four decades. The consolidated school was erected on High Street in 1933 and replaced the five one-room schools. By 1961, specimens from Dickens's collection were displayed at the High Street school.

A major expansion completed in 2006 added high-school classrooms, a gymnasium, a library and a cafeteria.

== Organization and academics ==
Block Island School is the only school in the New Shoreham School District, which serves kindergarten through grade 12. The district is governed by a five-member School Committee elected at large, which appoints the superintendent and has general responsibility for the town's public-school system. The school is organized into an elementary division for grades K–4, middle grades 5–7 and a high school for grades 8–12. During a 2024 state review, classes generally contained between five and eleven students; the review found that the small groups allowed individualized instruction at all three levels.

At the high-school level, Block Island School combines courses taught in the building with online, independent and college-credit study. Honors work is available in selected subjects. In 2025–26, Advanced Placement Computer Science Principles also carried concurrent credit from the University of Rhode Island, while advanced Spanish courses were offered through Rhode Island College's Early Enrollment Program. Students may also use statewide courses, the Community College of Rhode Island's Running Start program, independent study, internships and other online coursework when a subject cannot be accommodated within the school's schedule. The curriculum includes Spanish, music, visual arts and industrial technology alongside the core academic subjects.

For the classes of 2026 and later, graduation requirements include a Senior Project and Exhibition. Students begin developing their projects during their junior year, undertake research and mentor-guided fieldwork and present their work publicly. Projects have drawn on mentors from island businesses and organizations and have sometimes been combined with internships.

The combination of internal and outside study reflects both the school's scale and its island setting. District planning documents attribute the limited range of in-person advanced and career and technical courses partly to the small high-school staff; ferry schedules also make regular attendance at mainland programs difficult. The same planning work describes scarce year-round housing and weather-dependent ferry service as obstacles to recruiting employees and commuting from the mainland.

== Environmental education ==
Environmental education has repeatedly connected the school with Block Island's conservation organizations and field sites. A 1997 grant from the United States Environmental Protection Agency supported a partnership with The Nature Conservancy intended to involve students in every grade in outdoor and hands-on study. The project called for students to share their work with the island community through exhibits, articles and presentations.

By 2010, all Block Island School students were offered an annual opportunity to participate in the Block Island Christmas Bird Count under the direction of naturalist Scott Comings. Later elementary activities included a fourth-grade “Bird of the Year” unit combining research, nature walks and bird banding with Kim Gaffett, as well as second-grade visits to the Block Island Banding Station, where students observed banding and released birds.

== Campus ==
The school stands on a parcel identified as 4.04 acres (1.63 ha) on New Shoreham's 2019 tax assessor's map. The campus includes the original 1933 school and several later additions. A 1988 addition provided further classrooms and music space. A larger expansion completed in 2006 added a gymnasium, media center and administrative offices. The former gymnasium was converted into classrooms, an art studio and cafeteria space, and the previous library became a music area.

A statewide facility assessment conducted in 2016 and issued the following year measured the school at 67,900 sq ft (6,310 m^{2}) and found substantial repair and renewal needs across the building and site. In 2022, the Rhode Island Council on Elementary and Secondary Education approved a modernization project that included work on the gymnasium, building envelope, heating and ventilation, plumbing and educational spaces. Interior and exterior work on the gymnasium was complete by May 2026.

A separate long-range planning process began in late 2024 and received RIDE Stage I approval in April 2025. An August 2025 draft master plan considered approaches ranging from priority repairs to major renovation and additions, but did not select a final design. The district was still developing its Stage II application in May 2026, with submission to the state contemplated for that fall.

== Athletics ==
Block Island School's interscholastic teams are known as the Hurricanes. The boys' basketball team competed as the Dolphins when it won the school's first high-school championship in 1999; the Hurricanes name was in use by 2006. The school has competed in the Coastal Prep League, described as the Coastal Prep Conference in the 1999 resolution, and in the Rhode Island Interscholastic League. In 2026, the RIIL directory listed boys' basketball, soccer and volleyball and girls' basketball, cross-country and volleyball for Block Island. Athletic offerings vary with enrollment; baseball and softball were dropped for the 2022 season because the school lacked enough participants.

Travel to mainland contests requires a combination of ferry and bus transportation. Away games can occupy most of a day, and rough seas or canceled return service sometimes require teams to remain on the mainland overnight. Because rosters are small, the absence of only a few students can leave a team unable to compete, while athletic participation is high relative to the size of the high-school student body.

The Dolphins boys' basketball team won the 1999 Coastal Prep Conference championship under coach Chris Logan, defeating Prout 67–56 in the final. The Rhode Island Senate described it as the school's first high-school championship and recorded that approximately 150 supporters traveled from the island by ferry and bus to attend the game. Boys' basketball next won the Coastal Prep League championship in 2014–15. The baseball team won the league championship later in 2015 and its regular-season title in 2016; John Tarbox was among the coaches recognized for both achievements.

The varsity soccer team won the Coastal Preparatory League championship in 2018. In 2019, the girls' volleyball team finished as the RIIL Division III runner-up after reaching the state championship match. Boys' basketball added Coastal Prep championships in 2020, when it defeated the Grove School, and in March 2023, when it defeated Middlebridge 61–53.

Among the basketball program's documented individual milestones, Ross Draper became the first Hurricanes player to score 1,000 varsity career points in 2006. Derek Marsella achieved the feat in 2011. Kiley Hall became the first female player from the island to reach 1,000 points in 2015, and Richard Conant reached the mark in 2016.
