= Coventry High School (Rhode Island) =

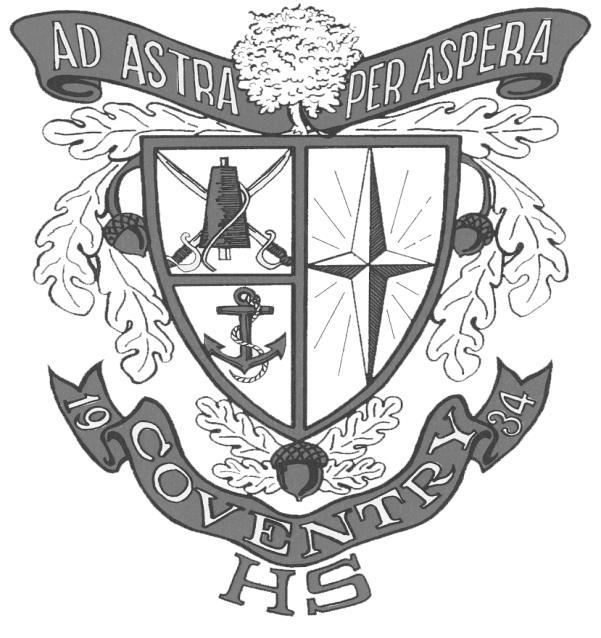

Location
- Coventry, Rhode Island; United States; 41°41′6″N 71°35′30″W

Information
- Type: Public
- Motto: Ad Astra Per Aspera (Through Difficulty, to the Stars)
- Established: 1934
- Principal: Brooke Macomber
- Grades: Nine-Twelve
- Enrollment: 1,482 (2016-17)
- Colors: Red, white, and black
- Mascot: Elephant
- Website: https://chs.coventryschools.net/

Coventry High School is a public high school located in Coventry, Rhode Island. Servicing grades Nine through Twelve, it has close to 1600 students, and is the only public high school in Coventry, Rhode Island. According to the latest report from Public School Review, the school is 40% male and 60% female. In terms of ethnicity, Coventry High School is 97% Caucasian, 1% Asian, 1% African-American, and 1% Hispanic. Coventry High School is located off of Route 3, at 40 Reservoir Road.

== Overview ==
The school's nickname is the Knotty Oakers, which is usually shortened to simply "Oakers". The original high school was built near the corner of Knotty Oak Road (Rt 116) and Rt 117, the location of a large oak tree that was a local landmark. The school's colors are red, white, and black and the mascot is an elephant.

== Athletics ==
In 2010-11 Coventry High School launched its first boys lacrosse team as a Club program. In 2011-12 the boys lacrosse team entered the RI Interscholastic League and during this inaugural season the team advanced to the state semi-finals, a remarkable accomplishment for a first year program. In the 2012–2013 season, the boys lacrosse team continued its momentum finishing first in DIII South and advanced to the Division III RI State championship game. Although the team was again defeated by Smithfield (undefeated for 3 consecutive seasons), The Coventry High School Boy Varsity Lacrosse team under the leadership of Coach DeSimone, is widely recognized as one of the rising powerhouses in Rhode Island high school lacrosse. www.covlax.org

In the 2013–2014 season, the boys team again reached the state finals where they were defeated by Tiverton

Coventry High's wrestling program won 17 consecutive Rhode Island State Championships from 1982 through 1998. They then ended the drought and brought the championship back home in 2022, led by Aidan Robichaud, Hayden Myers and Peyton Ellis. Since the program's inception in 1968, Oaker wrestlers have won a total of 20 state team championships (1972, 1974, 1982–1998, 2022).

Also, in 1984 Coventry High School's hockey program went 24-0 and had 210 GF and 6 GA winning the state title. The hockey program have also won 4 more D-II state championships since the 1984 team (1995-1996, 2002–2003, 2010–2011, and 2011–2012). They also won the D-I Eccleston conference as the state's top public school team (2012-2013). In that year they became the first public school since the 2004 Tollgate High School hockey team to beat Mount St. Charles Academy.

Coventry High School Basketball program has a storied history starting in the 1950s with the likes of Ted Szymcowic and Dick "Bevo" Gaudett leading the team. Ted Syzmcowicz coached the team to a championship in the 79–80 season. In the early 80's the Oakers made the playoffs every year. The 82–83 season was the last time the Oakers made the playoffs for a decade.

Coventry High School's Varsity Fastpitch Softball team won two consecutive RIIL Division 1 State Championships in 2009 and 2010. The fastpitch team was the first public school in Rhode Island to win back to back Division 1 state titles since the program switched from slow pitch to fast pitch.

Coventry High School's Football team won the 1992 Rhode Island Class B State Football Champions, where the Oakers went undefeated at 12-0 and were not scored upon for over half of their season. The 2021 Spring season (due to COVID) were the RI Division III State Champions. It was the first state championship in 19 years with the first 1st team all-state player in 17–20 years, the 2nd undefeated season in school history. It was the first time in school history 3 players were named to the all-state team ([1] - 1st team, [2] - 2nd team). Scored 221 points and only let up 44 total points, of the 44 points, 20 were in one game, 13 in another, which leaves only 11 points given up in 4 games. Shutouts of 55 & 31 points with 29+ pts per game over the season. Statistically the 2021 Spring team had the #1 Rushing Offense in RI, #2 Scoring Offense in RI, #2 Team Touchdowns in RI, #2 Total Yds. in RI, #1 Rushing Defense in RI. They won the state championship game 43-8 vs. Johnston, in which they rushed for 310 yards with had 5 different rushers & 4 rushing td's. The defense had 9 sacks en route to that Super Bowl win.

Other notable achievements include:The boys' volleyball team won state titles in 1986, 1987, 1992, and 1994–1996.

== History ==
Coventry High School was formed in 1934, presumably across Knotty Oak Road (called Rice Field, used for pop-warner football now). From archives, the building was a three-story building. Around the 1950s, CHS moved across the street to Foster Drive. From 1972 until 1975, the school held "double sessions"; upperclassmen classes in the morning and underclassmen in the afternoon. In 1975, CHS would make its final move to 40 Reservoir Road. Circa 1991, an addition was done on the back wing of the school, which butts Clubhouse road. During the summer of 2001, more additions were done to the building including the expansion of the 1991 addition, a preschool, another cafeteria, more along the westside of the school (which face the athletic fields) as well as the south face (student parking lot, and the movement of the Career and Tech educational programs (up until 2001, the tech programs' were still being taught at the foster drive location, which incidentally were being converted over to school admin offices).

Coventry High School is also home of the 081-AFJROTC. The drill team won seven Air Force Nationals Championships (02-06, 08, 09), with the team placing fourth in 2007.
