= St. Patrick Academy (Rhode Island) =

Private school in Providence, Rhode Island, United States

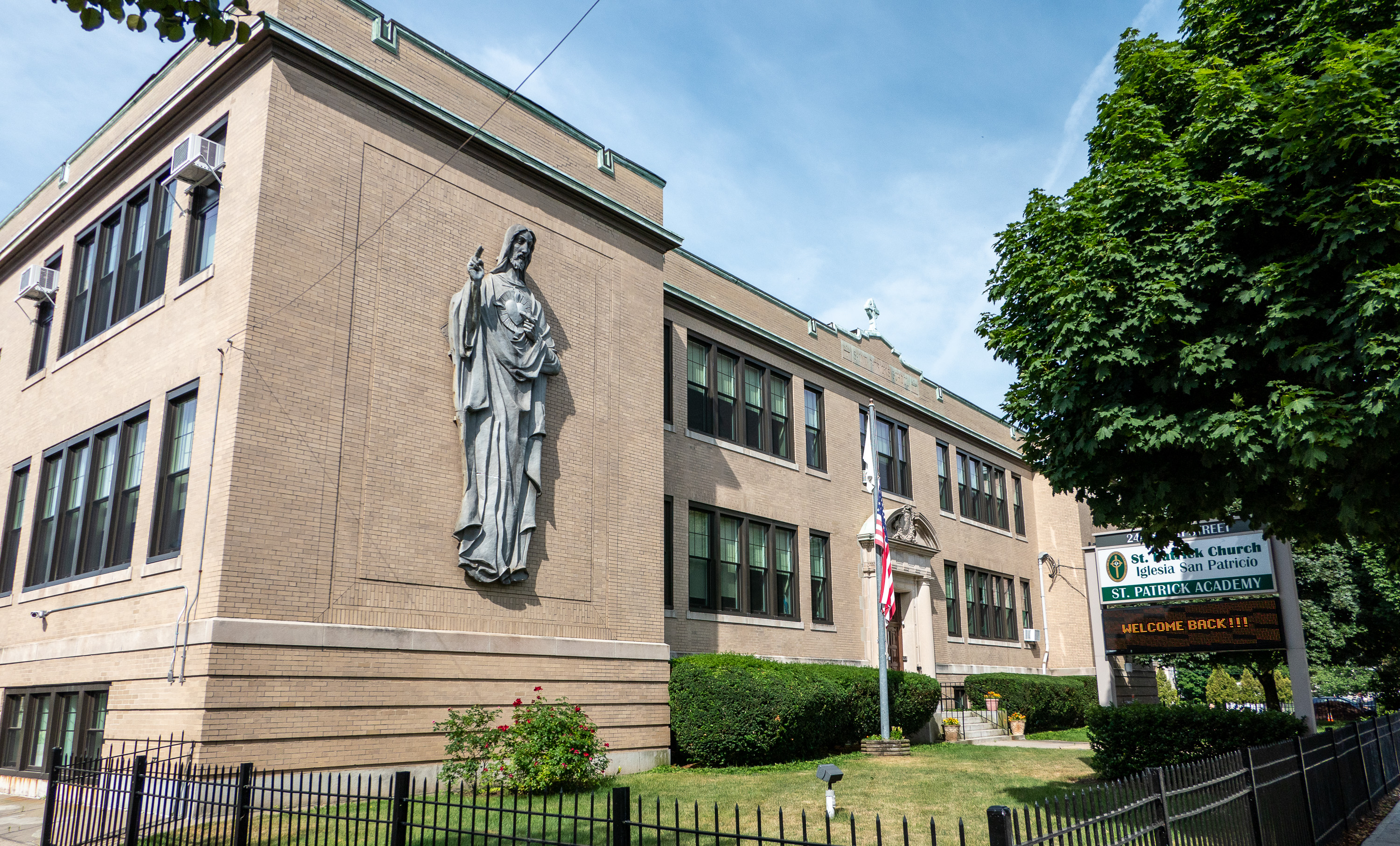

Location
- 244 Smith Street; Providence, (Providence County), Rhode Island 02908; United States
- Coordinates: 41°49′57″N 71°25′11″W

Information
- Type: Private, Coeducational
- Motto: Spiritual, Personal and Academic Excellence
- Religious affiliation: Roman Catholic
- Established: 2009
- President: Fr. James T. Ruggieri
- Chairperson: Dr. Patricia Ryan Recupero
- Principal: Bruce Daigle
- Faculty: 17
- Grades: 9–12
  - Grade 9: 25
  - Grade 10: 25
  - Grade 11: 22
  - Grade 12: 19
- Average class size: 15
- Hours in school day: 6
- Colors: Green and Gold
- Slogan: Engaged in the relentless pursuit of excellence.
- Athletics: Basketball, Track, Soccer, Cheerleading
- Team name: Padres
- Accreditation: New England Association of Schools and Colleges
- Tuition: No set tuition; parents pay what they can afford
- Website: www.stpatsri.org

St. Patrick Academy is a private, Roman Catholic high school in Providence, Rhode Island. It is located within the Roman Catholic Diocese of Providence.

== Background ==
Originally established as an all-girls school in 1843, St. Patrick Academy was reestablished as a high school in 2009 after the closure of its associated elementary school, which served grades 1–5. The original high school was first established in 1933 and closed in 1970. It is the oldest Catholic school in Rhode Island.
