= Narragansett High School =

Coordinates: 41.430303°N 71.469882°W

- 245 South Pier Road; Narragansett, Rhode Island 02882

Information
- Type: Public
- Established: September 1975
- School district: Narragansett Schools
- Principal: Christopher Fiore
- Grades: 9-12
- Enrollment: 427 (2023-2024)
- Colors: Red and White
- Mascot: Mariner
- Information: (401) 792-9400
- Website: Official website

Narragansett High School is a public high school in Narragansett, Rhode Island. As of 2024, Narragansett High School serves 427 students in grades 9–12. Narragansett High School's mascot is a Mariner. The mascot's name is Murdock the Mariner.
