= Saint Philomena School, Portsmouth, Rhode Island =

Private Catholic school in Rhodes Island

Coordinates: 41.598700°N 71.275107°W

Saint Philomena School is a private Catholic grammar school in Portsmouth, Rhode Island. The school has been designated a Blue Ribbon School of Excellence by the United States Department of Education. It is a member of the Sacred Heart Schools organization.

== History ==
Saint Philomena School was founded in 1953 by the Sisters Faithful Companions of Jesus, and today boasts a student body of approximately 480. The school was originally located in a single building on the Narragansett Bay, but has grown over the years into a campus of five buildings, including a free-standing auditorium and a new, state-of-the-art classroom building.

== Admissions ==
Admission is by application only, and each grade has fifty students or less. Scholarships are available from the school and through the Roman Catholic Diocese of Providence.

== Student body ==
Students come primarily from Aquidneck Island, Southeastern Massachusetts, and other parts of Rhode Island. Graduates of St. Philomena's go on to attend private and public high schools in Rhode Island and nearby Massachusetts, including the Portsmouth Abbey School, Bishop Stang High School, St. George's School, the Prout School, and Moses Brown School, amongst many others.
