= Bristol Warren Regional School District =

School district in Bristol, Rhode Island, United States

Bristol Warren Regional School District is a school district in Bristol, Rhode Island, United States. It serves the communities of Bristol and Warren in Rhode Island.

The district operates Mt. Hope High School in Bristol, Kickemuit Middle School in Warren, and four elementary schools. The district superintendent is Dr. Ana Riley.

The school district is financed by the taxpayers of both Warren and Bristol, based on per pupil population from each town. The budget is developed and recommended by the school committee, forwarded to the joint finance committee for final approval and enactment.

The Bristol/Warren Regional School Committee is a nine-member elected board. Six members are elected officials of the Town of Bristol and three members are elected officials of the Town of Warren. The terms are staggered. The joint finance committee is also composed of nine members. The membership comprises the five town council members and town administrator from the Town of Bristol and two members of the Warren Town Council and the Warren Town Manager.

The only middle school in the Bristol/Warren school district is Kickemuit Middle School. Elementary schools are Hugh Cole Elementary in Warren, Guiteras Elementary, Rockwell Elementary, and Colt Andrews Elementary (a US Department of Education Blue Ribbon School) in Bristol. The high school for both towns, Mount Hope High School, is located in Bristol.
