= Lincoln High School (Rhode Island) =

Location
- 135 Old River Road; Lincoln, Rhode Island 02865; United States
- Coordinates: 41.9366°N 71.4505°W

Information
- School type: Public
- Opened: 1964
- Status: Open
- School district: Lincoln Public Schools
- Superintendent: Lawrence Filipelli
- Principal: Kenneth Hopkins, Jr.
- Grades: 9–12
- Gender: Coeducational
- Enrollment: 989 (2023-2024)
- Colors: Red, white and navy blue
- Mascot: Lions
- Website: Lincoln High School

Lincoln High School is a school located in Lincoln, Rhode Island (in Providence County). Opened in 1964, the school has served as the main public high school for the town since. The official nickname of the school's athletic teams is the Lions. Its current enrollment as of 2024 is 989 students.

== History ==
Prior to the opening of Lincoln High School, students from Lincoln attended high schools in neighboring towns. The building previously also housed the town's junior high school until Lincoln Middle School was built in 2006.

In 2018, the school began a $60 million renovation process to renovate the school, which was completed in 2021. In addition to revamping the high school, the school district decided to build a physical education center on the LHS campus, which was completed in 2023.
