= Scituate High School (Rhode Island) =

Location
- 94 Trimtown Road; North Scituate, Rhode Island 02857; United States
- Coordinates: 41°49′28″N 71°37′13″W

Information
- School type: Public
- Status: Open
- School district: Scituate School Department
- NCES District ID: 4400960
- Superintendent: Carol Blanchette
- CEEB code: 400095
- NCES School ID: 440096000255
- Principal: Michael Hassell
- Staff: 71
- Teaching staff: 37.00 (FTE)
- Employees: 81
- Grades: 9–12
- Gender: Coeducational
- Enrollment: 371 (2023-2024)
- Average class size: 15
- Student to teacher ratio: 10.03
- Hours in school day: 6
- Classrooms: 42
- Colors: Blue and White
- Athletics conference: Division IIII
- Mascot: Spartans
- Team name: Spartans
- Rival: Ponaganset Chieftains
- Website: hs.scituateschoolsri.net

Scituate High School is a school located in North Scituate, Rhode Island (in Providence County). The majority of students live in the villages of Hope, Clayville and North Scituate, Rhode Island. The official nickname of the school's athletic teams is the Spartans. According to a US News, 467 students attend Scituate High School.

This is one of the few high schools in Rhode Island to receive a GreatSchools rating of 8 out of 10.
