= North Kingstown High School =

Public secondary school in Rhode Island, US

North Kingstown Senior High School

Location
- 150 Fairway Drive; North Kingstown, Washington County, Rhode Island, 02852; United States; 41°33′21″N 71°26′55″W

Information
- School type: Public high school
- Founded: 1901
- School board: North Kingstown School Committee
- School district: North Kingstown School District
- Superintendent: Kenneth Duva
- CEEB code: 400088
- Principal: Shivali Finkelstein
- Faculty: 104.00 (on full-time equivalent (FTE) basis)
- Grades: 9–12
- Gender: Co-Ed
- Student to teacher ratio: 12.44
- Colors: Black, Vegas Gold and White
- Song: Alma Mater
- Athletics conference: Rhode Island Interscholastic League
- Mascot: Skipper
- Rival: South Kingstown High School
- Accreditation: New England Association of Schools and Colleges
- Test average: Keep in 100
- Newspaper: The Current Wave
- Yearbook: Skippers' Log
- Communities served: North Kingstown, Jamestown
- Feeder schools: Davisville Middle School, Wickford Middle School, Jamestown Lawn School
- Website: https://nkhs.nksd.net/

North Kingstown Senior High School (North Kingstown High School) is a public secondary school located in North Kingstown, Rhode Island, United States. The school, which serves grades 9–12, is attended by residents of both North Kingstown and Jamestown. As of 2014–15, there were 1,407 students enrolled, and the faculty consisted of approximately 100 teachers.

== History ==
In 1901, the State Board of Education in Rhode Island approved the establishment of the Wickford Academy (now known as the North Kingstown Senior High School). Four years later, in 1905, the first graduates received their diplomas. 2005 marked the school's 100th anniversary. In the 2000s, a new school building replaced the old building, and is noted for opening the day after 9/11.

== Notable alumni ==
Elizabeth Beisel, a 2010 graduate of North Kingstown Senior High School, is a former international swimmer who won two Olympic medals. Beisel graduated from University of Florida in 2014 after competing in the 2008 and 2012 Olympics. She retired from swimming in 2018 and competed in Survivor: Island of the Idols.

Peter F. Neronha, a 1981 graduate of North Kingstown Senior High School, is the current Attorney General of Rhode Island and former United States Attorney for the District of Rhode Island.

Liz Beretta-Perik, a 1981 graduate of North Kingstown Senior High School is the current chairwoman of Rhode Island Democratic Party

== Controversies ==
Aaron Thomas, a former teacher, and basketball coach, was accused of "engaging in 'sexual contact' with two victims" and currently faces charges of second-degree child molestation and second-degree sexual assault. He is accused of performing "naked fat testing" on various students over the course of his two decades as a basketball coach, and is currently awaiting trial.

== Achievements ==
In 2013, U.S. News & World Report rated North Kingstown High School as the third best high school in the state of Rhode Island, awarding it a Silver Medal on a national scale. The school is accredited by the State of Rhode Island and the New England Association of Schools and Colleges.
