= East Greenwich High School =

Public high school in East Greenwich, Rhode Island

Coordinates: 41.639°N 71.485°W

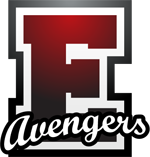

- East Greenwich High School after the completion of its new entrance in 2010
- 300 Avenger Drive (1600 Penn); East Greenwich, Rhode Island 02818; United States

Information
- Type: Public
- Motto: ¨Huzzah¨
- Established: 1942
- School district: East Greenwich Public Schools
- Superintendent: Alexis Meyers
- Principal: Ken Hopkins
- Teaching staff: 57.00 (on FTE basis)
- Grades: 9–12
- Student to teacher ratio: 12.93
- Hours in school day: 6.5
- Campus size: 61.75 acres
- Colors: Crimson and White
- Slogan: Empower
- Fight song: "EG Rumble"
- Athletics conference: Rhode Island Interscholastic League
- Mascot: The Avenger
- Team name: Avengers
- Rival: Middletown, Moses Brown, and North Kingstown
- Accreditation: New England Association of Schools and Colleges
- National ranking: 1
- Newspaper: The Spectrum
- Yearbook: The Crimson
- Alumni: Donald Carcieri, Debra Messing, Mark Thompson
- Website: egsd.net

East Greenwich High School is a public secondary school located in East Greenwich, Rhode Island, U.S. The school serves students in grades 9–12 in the East Greenwich Public Schools system. EGHS is the highest-performing public high school in the state. Its mascot is the "Avengers." East Greenwich High School was ranked 259 on Newsweek's list of America's Top 500 High Schools in 2016 out of approximately 31,700 high schools in the United States. It was the only high school in Rhode Island to make the list.

== School and campus ==
East Greenwich High School was founded in 1942. Formerly East Greenwich Academy, East Greenwich High School was located on 100 Cedar Avenue, East Greenwich, RI from 1956 until 1967 when it moved to its current location on Avenger Drive. Its current building was constructed in 1967 and its design was noted by The Architects' Collaborative. It has undergone many improvements to make the building more modern. In 2004, a new state of the art gymnasium was completed. In 2010, a new football field, track, front entrance, science wing, and other various projects were completed. In 2012, the library was completely remodeled.

As of the 2008–09 school year, the school had an enrollment of 769 students. As of September 2012, EGHS had a student-teacher ratio of 10:1, according to Rhode Island Monthly magazine.

=== Curriculum ===
East Greenwich High School offers a range of courses, including Spanish, French, and Latin. The school also provides more than 150 elective courses, along with a selection of advanced-level classes.

=== Testing scores and statistics ===
In 2012, East Greenwich High School was declared the top school in Rhode Island. EGHS consistently has top scores in both the NECAP and SAT tests. It has a 98% graduation rate compared to the 84% average in the state.

In September 2012, Rhode Island Monthly reported that East Greenwich HS had the state's highest grade 11 NECAP Science scores. EGHS students averaged 1723 out of 2400 on the SAT.

In 2014, East Greenwich High School was ranked 824th on Newsweek's list of America's top 1,000 high schools out of approximately 31,700 high schools in the United States. The other R.I. high school to make the list that year was Barrington High School, which entered into the top 200.

In 2016, East Greenwich High School was ranked 259 on Newsweek's list of America's Top 500 High Schools out of approximately 31,700 high schools in the United States and was the only Rhode Island high school to make the list that year.

However, in recent years, East Greenwich High School has begun to stutter academically, falling further and further behind in rankings. As of July 2019, East Greenwich is ranked #655 in the nation according to U.S. News & World Report, over 450 spots below two other Rhode Island public high schools, Classical High School and Barrington High School.

97% of EGHS students attend higher education after graduation.

== Student publications ==
=== The Spectrum ===
The Spectrum, East Greenwich High School's student run newspaper was founded in 1976 by a group of students. It is published six times per school year and any student may participate in the publication of the newspaper.

=== The Crimson ===
The EGHS yearbook, The Crimson, has been published since the school's founding in 1942. It has been awarded First Place All-New England by the New England Scholastic Press Association at Boston University for the past 21 years. Any interested student may join the yearbook staff.

== Athletics ==
=== Sports ===
Fall Sports: Cross country running, football, soccer, girls' field hockey, girls' tennis, and girls' volleyball.

Winter Sports: Basketball, boys' hockey, indoor track, swimming, wrestling, and cheerleading.

Spring: Baseball, softball, golf, lacrosse, boys' tennis, outdoor track, sailing, and boys' volleyball.

=== Championships ===
East Greenwich High School has won Rhode Island State Championships & National Championships (highest division or All State titles)

Division 1 Championships & National Championships

- 1989, 1991, 1992, 1994, 2010, 2019 Division 1 Field Hockey
- 1991 Girls Outdoor Track
- 1993 Boys Golf
- 2004 Division 1 Girls Volleyball
- 2007 Division 1A Boys Ice Hockey
- 2007 Boys Cross Country (also finished 2nd in New England)
- 2010 D-1 State Champions – Unified Basketball
- 2012 National Champions – Unified Volleyball
- 2012 D-1 State Champions – Unified Volleyball
- 2013 National Champions – Unified Volleyball
- 2013 D-1 State Champions – Unified Volleyball
- 2013 Division 1 Girls Tennis (undefeated)

Avenger athletic teams have also won numerous other titles in Divisions II and III, as well as Class B and C championships. The most recent being the Division 2 Boys Soccer title in 2009 and the Division 2 Boys Lacrosse titles in 2011, 2012, 2013, and 2014. Boys cross country also consistently wins the Class C championship (see below.)

Division 2 & 3 State Championships

- 2011 Division 2 State Champions Boys Lacrosse
- 2012 Division 2 State Champions Boys Lacrosse
- 2013 Division 2 State Champions Boys Lacrosse
- 2014 Division 2 State Champions Boys Lacrosse
- 2019 Division 2 State Champions Boys Basketball
- 2012 Division 3 State Runners-up Boys Football
- 2013 Division 3 State Runners-up Boys Football
- 2014 Division 3 State Runners-up Boys Football
- 2015 Class C State Champions Boys Track & Field
- 2015 Division 3 State Champions Boys Football

Recent individual state champions include the past two girls tennis champions: Peri Sheinin in 2013, and Aleksandra Drljaca in 2012. In 2010, Nick Ross won the New England Indoor Track Championships 1000 meter run. In 2008, Mark Feigen won the New England Cross Country Championship. There have also been several other Avenger individual State and New England champions, All-Americans, as well as athletes who have gone on to compete in NCAA division I, II, and III athletics.

=== Cross Country ===
The 2019 girls' cross country team won their division, the Class C championship, and were Rhode Island State Champions. They also placed fourth in New England. The girls' team were state runners-up in 1997, 1998, and 2020. EG had individual state champions in 2002 with Nicole Millette and in 2020 with Reese Fahys.

Coach Erin Terry won Rhode Island Cross Country Coach of the Year in 2019. Head coach Peter Dion has been selected as the Rhode Island Cross Country Coach of Year three times: 2006, 2007, and 2013.

Despite only having been re-instated in 2004, boys' cross country has been the most successful program at EGHS in recent years, capturing the 2005, 2006, 2007, 2008, 2011, 2012, 2013, 2014, 2015, and 2016 Class C titles, having the individual champion every year from 2004 to 2008, and in 2013. Class C contains the smallest classification of high schools in Rhode Island. Winning Class C would be the equivalent of winning a state championship in most other sports, since most other sports do not have an all-state championship that combines schools of all sizes.

Since 2005, more than 20 different boys from the school have earned All State honors, and over 30 have earned All Class honors. Several have earned the honors more than once.

Since 2005, EG boys cross country has compiled a regular season record of 103 wins and 14 losses (an 88% win percentage), by far the highest winning percentage of any team at EGHS and one of the best of any team from any sport in the state.

The 2007 boys cross country team defeated Bishop Hendricken in a dual meet, ending the second-longest winning streak in the country. Hendricken had not lost a dual meet since 1978, amassing over 250 consecutive regular season wins. (During that time Hendricken also collected 16 State Championships and 9 New England titles.)

Despite being among the five smallest public high schools in the state, the 2007 team was undefeated against Rhode Island schools, won the Division, Class, and State Championships, were runner-up at the New England Championship, and ranked top 10 in the Northeast Region.

In 2008, two of the team's runners finished 1st and 3rd at the New England Championship.

East Greenwich was the only public school to finish top 6 in Rhode Island every year from 2005 to 2009, qualifying for the New England Championship. (Only larger private schools Hendricken and LaSalle Academy also accomplished this streak). In 2012, 2013, 2014, and 2015 the boys team was the best public school in the state, finishing 3rd each year behind Hendricken and LaSalle. In 2013, East Greenwich won the Freshman State Championship, their first-ever Freshman title. In 2018, the boys' 4x800 team placed first at States and third at Nationals.

== Notable alumni ==
- Rye Barcott, bestselling author, It Happened on the Way to War
- Donald Carcieri, 73rd governor of Rhode Island
- Skylar Fontaine, ice hockey player
- Sara Gideon, speaker of the Maine House of Representatives and Democratic nominee for the United States Senate in Maine in 2020
- Debra Messing, actress
- Mark Thompson, investigative reporter and Pulitzer Prize winner.
- Andrew Revkin, science and environmental journalist for The New York Times
- Leeann Tingley, 2006 Miss Rhode Island USA
- Dean Budnick, adjunct professor, film creator, podcaster, and editor in chief of Relix
