= Chariho Regional School District =

Rhode Island school district

Coordinates: 41.47542°N 71.68442°W

Location
- Rhode Island United States

District information
- Type: Public
- Motto: Respect and Responsibility for all
- Grades: PK-12
- Established: 1958
- Superintendent: Gina Picard
- Accreditation: NEASC

Students and staff
- Students: 3,800
- District mascot: The Charger
- Colors: Green and white

Other information
- Website: http://www.chariho.k12.ri.us

Chariho is a regional school district located in southern Rhode Island shared by three adjacent towns; Charlestown, Richmond, and Hopkinton. The name Chariho is a portmanteau derived by taking the first two letters from each town name and combining them together. The district operates four elementary schools, two of which are located in Hopkinton, in the villages of Ashaway and Hope Valley, one in Charlestown, and one in Richmond. The Chariho campus located in the Richmond village of Wood River Junction houses the Middle and High Schools, as well as the Chariho Career And Technical Center.

Chariho Regional Junior-Senior High School (its full name) opened in the fall of 1960; prior to that year, students attended schools in nearby South Kingstown or Westerly. The first class to attend the school for all six grades was the class of 1966. That same year, Chariho won the Rhode Island Interscholastic League statewide baseball championship.

Enrollment of the High School is around 1200 students including 430 in the Career and Technical school (as of 2012). Students from surrounding districts can attend the Chariho Career And Technical Center.

The Chariho Act is the legislation governing the regional school district. Each town contributes taxes proportionally based on student enrollment.

The name Chariho is also often used to describe the region including its three towns, as a number of local organizations and businesses have used the name.
