= Wood River Junction, Rhode Island =

Wood River Junction
- Village
- Location within Rhode Island Location within the United States
- Coordinates: 41°26′10″N 71°41′40″W
- Country: United States
- State: Rhode Island
- County: Washington
- Town: Richmond

Wood River Junction is a small village in the town of Richmond, Rhode Island, Washington County, Rhode Island, United States. It is home to the Chariho school district's main campus and is otherwise largely turf farms, which were potato farms before the nuclear accident in 1964.

== Geography ==
Wood River Junction is commonly considered by locals to be one of the coldest locations in the state of Rhode Island, due to its low-lying and flat geography. It is the home of Meadowbrook Pond, also known as Wood River Pond, a popular fishing area. It is surrounded by two rivers: the Wood River and Pawcatuck River.

== History ==
=== Overview ===
The village was the site of Wood River Junction station, originally known as Richmond Switch. The Wood River Branch Railroad was chartered in 1872 and completed in 1874. The name was changed in April 1874. The six-mile branch line was built to provide service from the Hope Valley to the main line of the New York, Providence and Boston Railroad. The New York, New Haven and Hartford Railroad took over operation of the Branch in 1892 and eventually abandoned it on August 8, 1947. The main line continues in operation today as Amtrak's Northeast Corridor.

=== Criticality accident ===
On July 24, 1964, a fatal criticality accident occurred at the United Nuclear Corporation's Wood River Junction nuclear facility. This facility was designed to recover highly enriched uranium from scrap material left over from fuel element production. Technician Robert Peabody, intending to add a bottle of 1,1,1-trichloroethane to remove organics from a tank containing radioactive uranium-235 in a sodium carbonate solution, mistakenly added a bottle of uranium solution instead. This produced a criticality excursion accompanied by a flash of light. About 10 liters (2.2 imp gal; 2.6 U.S. gal) out of 40 to 50 liters (8.8 to 11.0 imp gal; 11 to 13 U.S. gal) of the tank's contents were splashed out of the tank.

This criticality exposed the 37-year-old Peabody to a fatal dose of radiation. Estimates for the received dose vary, as accurate counting was limited. An initial estimation based on blood cells was placed at 2,070 rad from fast neutrons, and 7,930 rad from gamma rays for a total dose of 10,000 rad. Further analysis and estimation revealed that at minimum the operator received a full body dose of 7,000 rad with a maximum dose of 19,000 rad. Later estimates based on the source of radiation yielded higher results; a minimum dose estimate of 15,000 rad (150 sieverts), as well as a maximum dose of 26,000 rad. Overall, the accepted dose estimate in the report was in excess of 100 sieverts, with a range of approximately 70–260 sieverts. This means that Peabody received the highest external full body dose in history. Estimates to individual parts of his body were also made. Tests performed on his wedding ring yielded an estimate of 700 rem (7 sieverts) to that individual finger. His head received an estimated dose of 14,000 rem (140 sieverts) and his pelvis received the largest dose; calculated at 46,000 rem (460 sieverts). He died 49 hours later.

Ninety minutes later, a second excursion happened when a plant manager returned to the building and turned off the agitator, exposing himself and another administrator to doses of up to 100 rad (1 sievert).

Members of the local Westerly Ambulance Corps responded to render aid, initially transporting the patient to Westerly Hospital; the hospital was not equipped for such a radiation-exposed patient, the ambulance was turned away and the ambulance transported the patient to Rhode Island Hospital in Providence.

Although commonly referred to as taking place in Wood River Junction, the incident actually occurred just across the river in Charlestown.
