= Mt. Hope High School =

Public school in Bristol, Rhode Island, US

Coordinates: 41.687502°N 71.268905°W

Location
- 199 Chestnut Street; Bristol, Rhode Island; USA

Information
- Type: US Public Secondary
- Motto: Achieving Excellence
- Established: September 1993
- School district: Bristol Warren Regional School District
- Principal: Michelle King
- Teaching staff: 64.20 (FTE)
- Grades: 9–12
- Enrollment: 879 (2022–2023)
- Student to teacher ratio: 13.69
- Campus: Suburban
- Campus size: 43 acres (17 ha)
- Colors: Purple, White, Black and Silver
- Mascot: Huskies
- Website: https://mhhs.bwrsd.org/
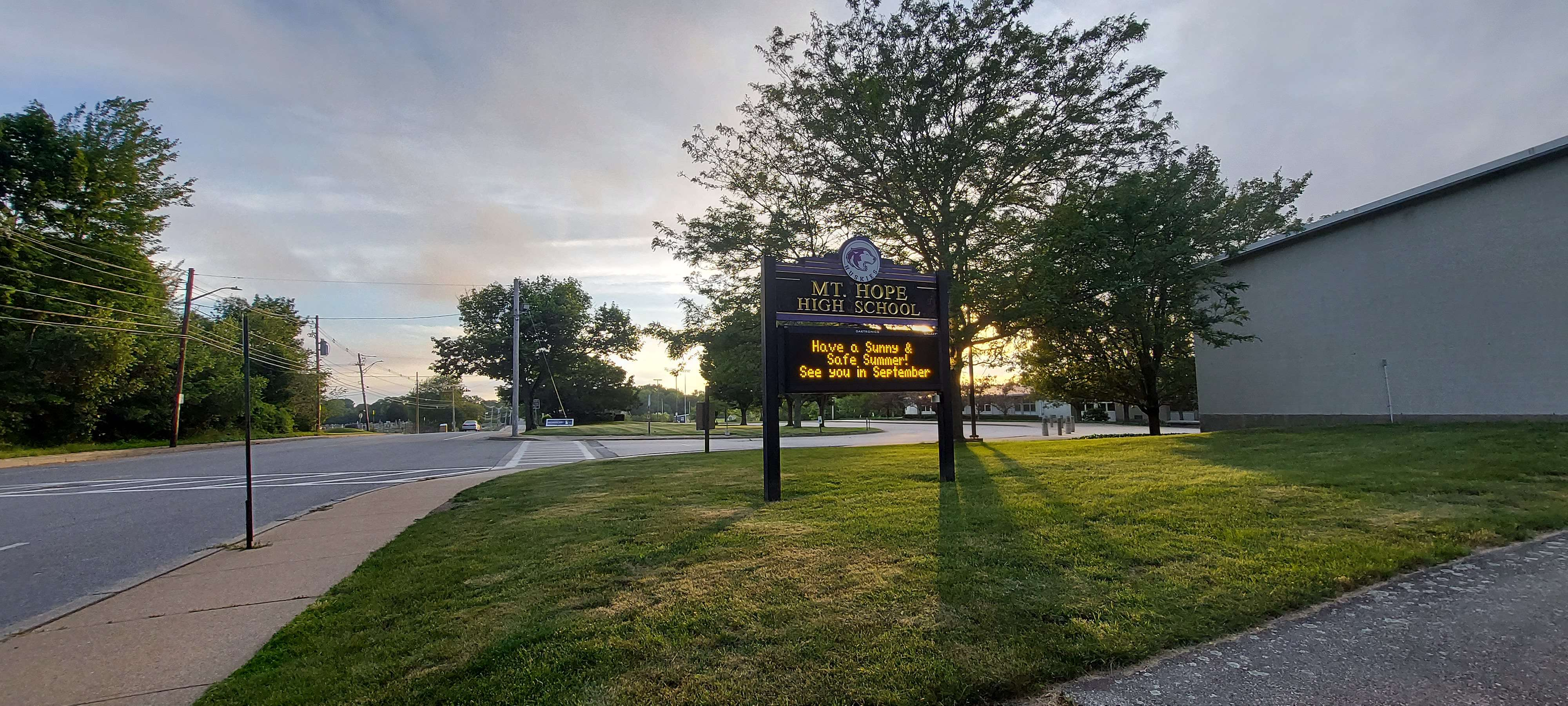
- Hall Entrance, June 2021

Mt. Hope High School is a regionalized secondary school that is located at 199 Chestnut Street in Bristol, Rhode Island, United States. Mt. Hope educates students in grades nine through twelve from both Bristol and Warren, Rhode Island, and is operated by the Bristol Warren Regional School District. Mt. Hope High School's seal contains a shield depicting two books and a torch to signify scholarship and an anchor, which is the symbol on the Rhode Island state flag. Below the shield is writing that says "E Duobus Unum", meaning "From two, one", which is to signify the regionalization of the school.

== History ==
Mt. Hope High School was founded in September 1993, when Warren High School and Bristol High School merged. During this time, both the Bristol and Warren Regional Districts were becoming combined. The school occupies the former Bristol H.S. complex.

=== Graduation requirements ===
Mt. Hope High School implements four graduation requirements. First, students will need to acquire 23 Carnegie Units (Credits) throughout their education. Credits from specific content areas must be obtained that amount to the required 23 credits. Second, students will need to demonstrate proficiency in a set of academic, social, and civic regulations known as "Proficiency-Based Graduation Requirements". These academic expectations include listening, speaking, reading, writing, and problem-solving effectively. Each student must score a grade of "Proficient" or higher. These regulations tie in with the new diploma system of the school; any student graduating in 2008 or later must average a score of "Proficient" in all the rubrics to be able to officially graduate Mt. Hope High School. They also have to create a digital portfolio, which is an online showcase of the student's best work. As the third graduation requirement, Mt. Hope students in the Class of 2015 and onward must have completed the New England Common Assessment Program with at least a score of "Proficient" in Math, English, and Science. Starting with the Class of 2014, the NECAP is planned to be replaced with the PARCC as the graduation requirement. Last, students are required to create an Individual Learning Plan (ILP). This ILP is able to be accessed through the digital portfolio and includes such components as an assessment of skills, values, interests, creation of goals, and is used in the course selection process.

=== New school ===
In 2023, voters overwhelmingly approved to build a new high school, estimated to be valued at $200 million. It is expected to be completed in 2027.

== Sports ==
=== Fall season (September–November) ===
Cross Country, American football, Boys' Soccer, Girls' Soccer, Girls' Tennis, Girls' Volleyball. Varsity Cheerleading

=== Winter season (December–February) ===
Ice hockey, Boys' Basketball, Girls' Basketball, Boys' Indoor Track, Girls' Indoor Track, Boys' Swimming, Girls' Swimming, Wrestling and Gymnastics.

=== Spring season (March–June) ===
Baseball, Golf, Boys' Lacrosse, Girls' Lacrosse, Girls' Softball, Boys' Tennis, Boys' Track and Field, Girls' Track and Field, Boys' Volleyball.

== Programs offered ==
Mt. Hope High School offers an assortment of clubs and activities.

=== Notable programs ===
==== Band ====
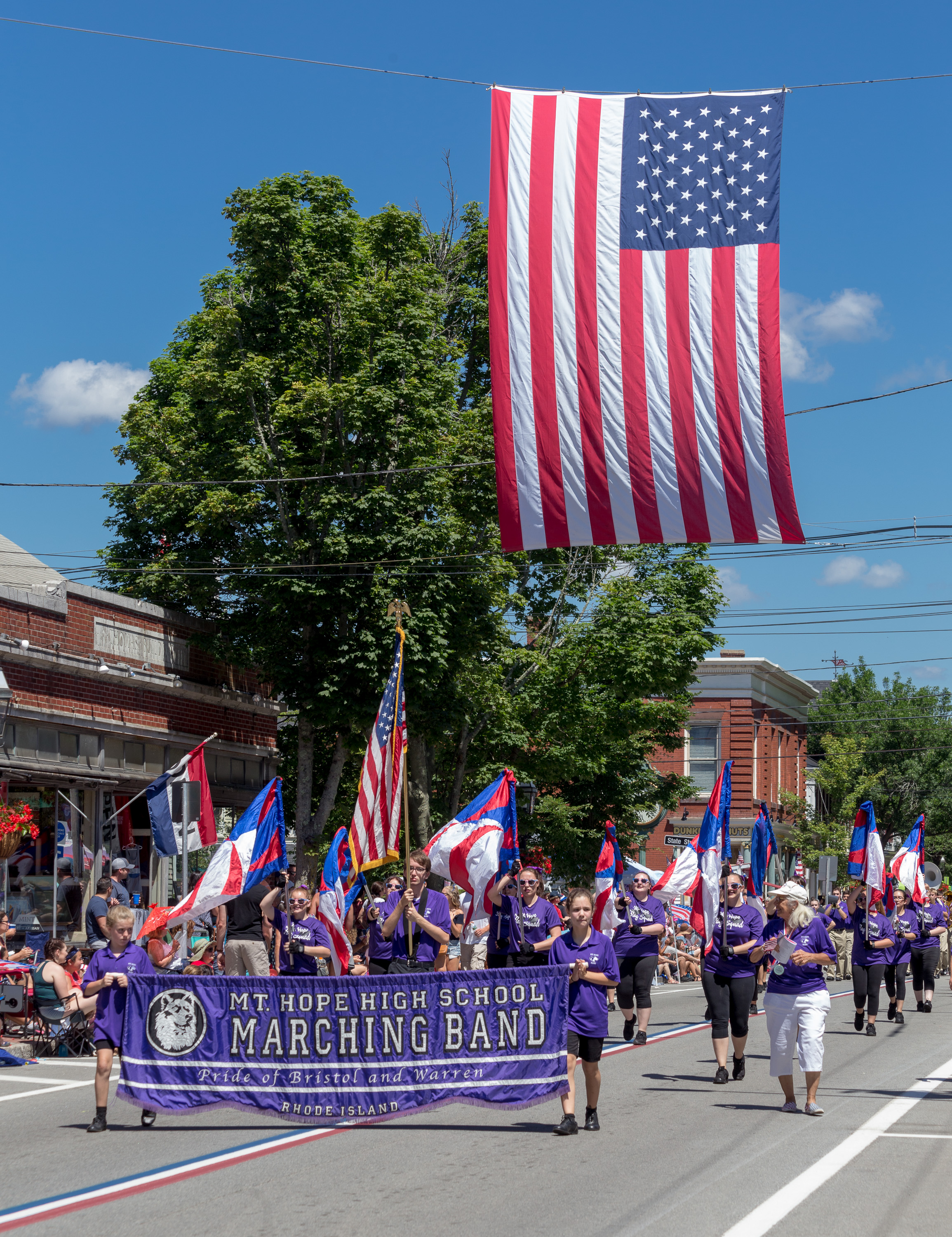
Mount Hope High School marching band in the 2017 Bristol 4th of July parade

Every year, the MHHS Marching Band participates in several parades, including Bristol's Fourth of July Parade. The Mt. Hope High School Symphonic Band performs multiple concerts throughout the school year and has even played with the Navy Band Northeast. Mt. Hope also has a jazz program which consists of the Jazz Ensemble, Jazz Band, and the Jazz Improvisational Vocal Ensemble (JIVE). Mt. Hope's jazz groups have participated in many festivals such as the Berklee Jazz Festival and the Somerset Jazz Festival. Every year, Mt. Hope High School holds a "Jazz Night"; a concert encompassing every jazz ensemble at Mt. Hope, the Kickemuit Middle School, and occasionally other ensembles.

==== Husky News Network (HNN) ====
The Husky News Network, also known as HNN, is a daily five-minute television program produced live weekday mornings by Mt. Hope High School students. HNN is currently run by the Broadcasting class. The show was first broadcast in 2004.

Initially, the show was operated using just a single camera in the then AV Room. In the summer of 2008 it began operating with three cameras, as well as full HNN specials throughout the year. A short-lived HNN Headline News show in 2009 consisted of news presented in a different light as well as student work demonstrated 24 hours a day 7 days a week. In late 2009, HNN moved its studios to a bigger space located on the first floor of Mt. Hope High School, in a space once occupied by the School Store. The new location consist of one half of the room is HNN, and the other half is the Husky Hut. Typical segments on the five-minute program include school news announcements, sports, and reports on school events by a pair of anchor news reporters.

===== Math Team =====
The Math Team participates in competitive math meets every year competing against local schools in the area. The competitions are held at Portsmouth High School. There are four meets at the school level. Schools are awarded points for correct answers in rounds. The two schools with the highest total scores by the end of the fourth meet will go on to the state level to compete.

== School accomplishments ==
=== Academics ===
In 2022, Mt. Hope was ranked 14th best high school in Rhode Island, and 3,455 nationally.

=== Music arts ===
- The Mt. Hope Marching Band always leads Bristol's Fourth of July Parade, USA's oldest Fourth of July parade/celebration.
- The Symphonic Band performed with the Navy Band Northeast, which is considered one of the greatest bands in the country.
- Many students from the music program participate in All-State Band Festival (music competition).
- The Mt. Hope guitar ensemble won several awards at a competition at Pace University in New York City in 2006

=== Sports ===
Girls

- Gymnastics: 2016, 2017, 2018, 2019 Undefeated Division II State Champions
- Indoor Track: 2012 Division II RI State Championship
- Lacrosse: 2008 Division I-A State Championship against Cranston West; 2015, 2016 Division II State Championship Runner-up
- Soccer: 2007 Division I State Championship against LaSalle Academy
- Softball: 2015 & 2016 Division III RI State Championship
- Tennis: 2012 Division III RI State Championship & 2019 Division II RI State Championship

Boys

- Basketball: 2003 Division II State Championship
- Football: 1998 Division II Super Bowl Champions; 2010 Division II Super Bowl Runner-Up
- Hockey: 2010, 2017: Division III State Championship
- Lacrosse: 2005, 2009, 2010 Division II RI State Championship
- Soccer: 1993 RI State Soccer Championship
- Swimming: 2004, 2005, 2006: Swimming Division III State Championship
