= Exeter-West Greenwich Regional School District =

Rhode Island school district

Location
- Rhode Island United States

District information
- Type: Public
- Motto: Making "Challenge to Learn" a Reality
- Grades: PK-12
- Established: 1956
- Superintendent: James H. Erinakes II
- Accreditation: NEASC

Students and staff
- Students: 1,680
- District mascot: Knights

Other information
- Website: https://www.ewgrsd.org/

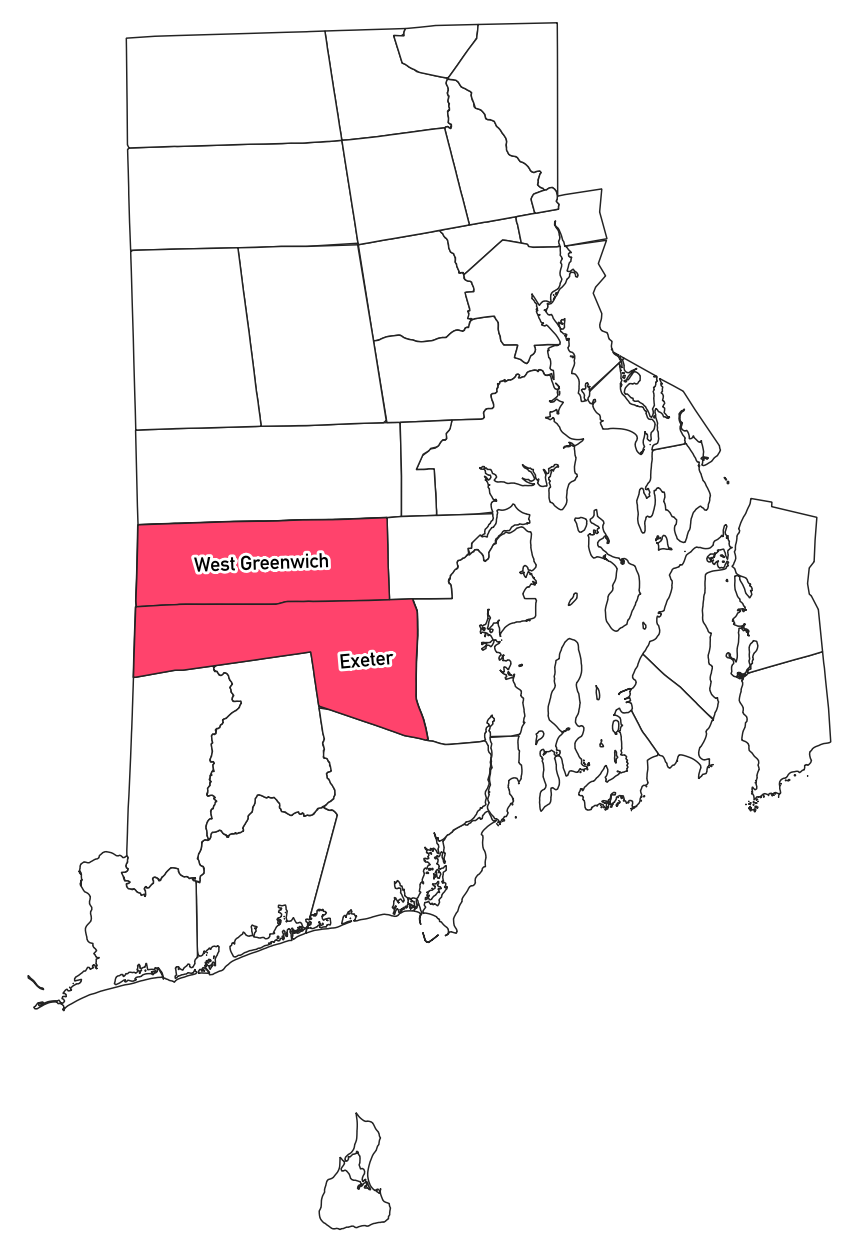
Exeter and West Greenwich, Rhode Island

Exeter-West Greenwich Regional School District (EWG) is a public school district in Kent County and Washington County, Rhode Island, United States, serving the rural towns of Exeter and West Greenwich in the south-central part of the state. The school district was founded in 1956 and serves approximately 1,600 students. It is one of four multi-town school districts in the state of Rhode Island.

The district operates five schools:

- Mildred E. Lineham School (West Greenwich), pre-K
- Metcalf Elementary School (Exeter), grades K-6
- Wawaloam Elementary School (Exeter), grades K-6
- Exeter-West Greenwich Junior High School (West Greenwich), grades 7-8
- Exeter-West Greenwich Senior High School (West Greenwich), grades 9-12

The junior and senior high schools are located on the same campus at 930 Nooseneck Hill Road in West Greenwich, close to the Exeter town line.
