= Cranston School District =

School district in Rhode Island, United States

Address
- 845 Park Avenue Cranston, Rhode Island, 2910; United States
- Coordinates: 41.77270°N 71.46288°W

District information
- Type: Public
- Grades: PreK–12
- NCES District ID: 4400240

Students and staff
- Students: 10,403 (2020–2021)
- Teachers: 789.13 (on an FTE basis)
- Staff: 870.61 (on an FTE basis)
- Student–teacher ratio: 13.18:1

Other information
- Website: www.cpsed.net

Cranston School District is a school district located in Cranston, Rhode Island, USA, which services an approximate student population of 11,155 in pre-kindergarten through twelfth grade. With 790 full-time classroom teachers, the district's overall student/teacher ratio is 14.1:1. There are 24 schools associated with the agency, which is classified as being in or near a mid-sized city (Cranston, RI). Cranston School District allocates approximately $5,572 per pupil for instructional expenses.

Educational facilities that are a part of this agency (district). There are 23 schools listed below. Click on a school's name to find information about that school.

== Elementary schools ==
1. Arlington School
2. Daniel D. Waterman School
3. Eden Park School
4. Edgewood Highland
5. Edward S. Rhodes School
6. George J. Peters School
7. Gladstone Street School
8. Glen Hills School
9. Stadium School
10. Stone Hill School
11. William R. Dutemple School
12. Garden City School
13. Oak Lawn School
14. Woodridge School
15. Orchard Farms School

== Middle schools ==
1. Hugh B. Bain Middle School (Named a High Performing School in 2007)
2. Park View Middle School
3. Western Hills Middle School
4. Hope Highlands Middle School (as of 2016)

== High schools ==
1. Cranston High School East
2. Cranston High School West
3. Cranston Area Career & Technical Center
4. Apprenticeship Exploration School
