= East Greenwich School Department =

School district in Rhode Island, US

Coordinates: 41.6607°N 71.4515°W

East Greenwich School District
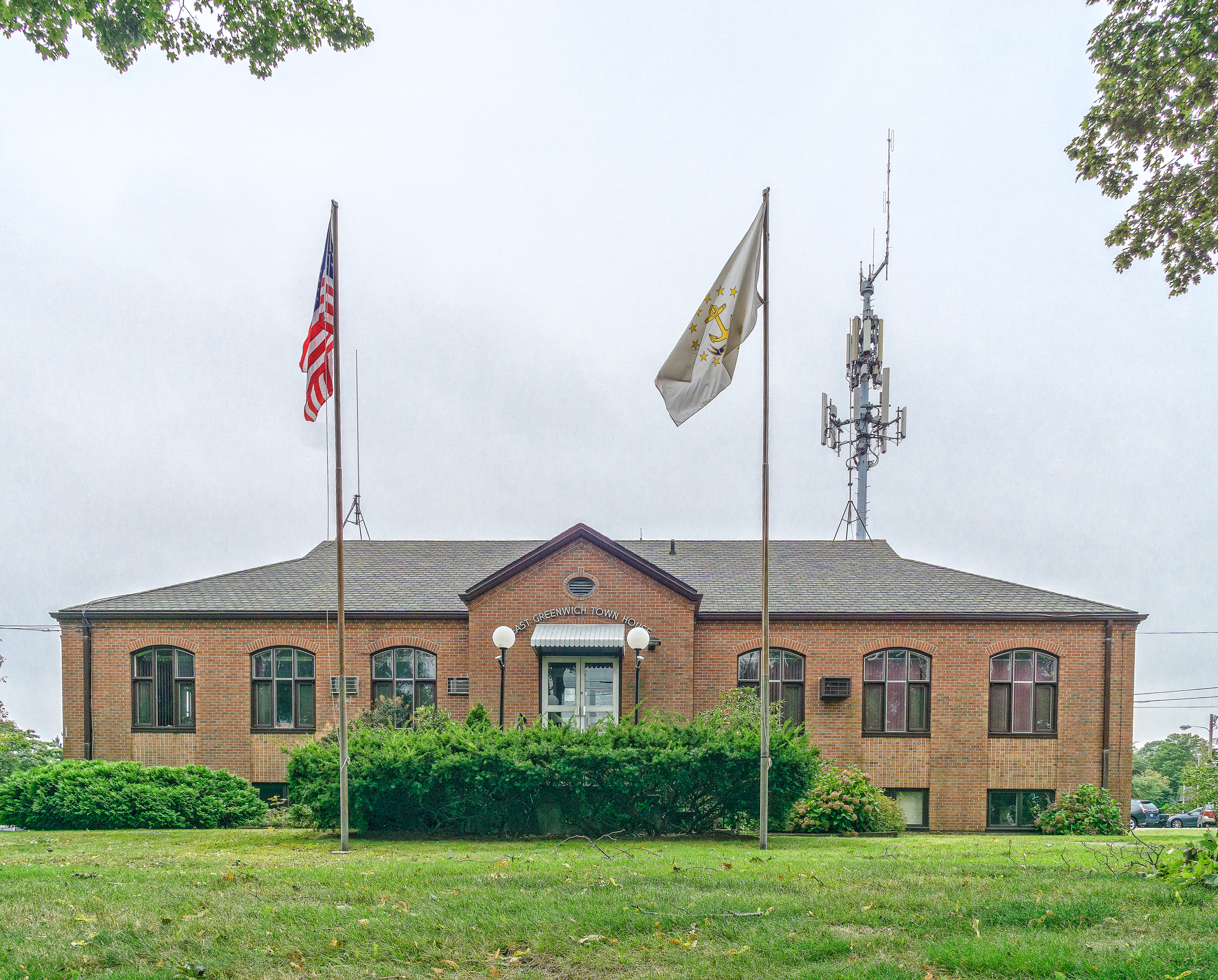
- The East Greenwich public schools central office, at 111 Pierce Street.

Location
- East Greenwich, Rhode Island; United States

District information
- Type: Public
- Motto: ‘All Means All’
- Grades: PK–12

East Greenwich School District.

The East Greenwich School Department (EGSD) or East Greenwich Public Schools is a public school district located in East Greenwich, Rhode Island. It is made up of six different schools.

== Schools ==
- Meadowbrook Farms Elementary School (K-2)
- Frenchtown Elementary School (K-2)
- George R. Hanaford Elementary School (3-5)
- James H. Eldredge Elementary School (3-5)
- Archie R. Cole Middle School (6-8)
- East Greenwich High School (9-12)
