= List of Providence County, Rhode Island schools =

This is a list of schools in Providence County, Rhode Island.

== High schools ==
(9th-12th grade unless otherwise noted)

School	District/School type	Location
Beacon Charter High School for the Arts	Charter	Woonsocket, Rhode Island
Burrillville High School	Burrillville School District	Burrillville, Rhode Island
Central High School	Providence School District	Providence, Rhode Island
Central Falls High School	Central Falls School District	Central Falls, Rhode Island
Classical High School	Providence School District	Providence, Rhode Island
Cranston Area Career & Technical Center	Cranston School District	Cranston, Rhode Island
Cranston High School East	Cranston School District	Cranston, Rhode Island
Cranston High School West	Cranston School District	Cranston, Rhode Island
Cumberland High School	Cumberland School District	Cumberland, Rhode Island
Davies Career & Technical High School	Lincoln School District	Lincoln, Rhode Island
East Providence Area Career & Technical Center	East Providence School District	East Providence, Rhode Island
East Providence High School	East Providence School District	East Providence, Rhode Island
Feinstein High School	Providence School District	Providence, Rhode Island
Hanley Career & Technical Center	Providence School District	Providence, Rhode Island
Hope High School	Providence School District	Providence, Rhode Island
Johnston Senior High School	Johnston School District	Johnston, Rhode Island
Lincoln Senior High School	Lincoln School District	Lincoln, Rhode Island
Mount Pleasant High School	Providence School District	Providence, Rhode Island
North Providence High School	North Providence School District	North Providence, Rhode Island
North Smithfield High School	North Smithfield School District	North Smithfield, Rhode Island
Ponaganset High School	Foster-Glocester Regional School District	North Scituate, Rhode Island
Scituate High School	Scituate School District	Scituate, Rhode Island
Shea High School	Pawtucket School District	Pawtucket, Rhode Island
Smithfield High School	Smithfield School District	Smithfield, Rhode Island
Time Squared Academy	Providence School District	Providence, Rhode Island
Tolman High School	Pawtucket School District	Pawtucket, Rhode Island
Woonsocket High School	Woonsocket School District	Woonsocket, Rhode Island
Woonsocket Area Career and Technical Center	Woonsocket School District	Woonsocket, Rhode Island

== Middle and junior high schools (6th-8th grade unless otherwise noted) ==
School	District/School type	Location
Birchwood Middle School	North Providence School District	North Providence, Rhode Island
Bishop Middle School	Providence School District	Providence, Rhode Island
Burrillville Middle School	Burrillville School District	Burrillville, Rhode Island
Calcutt Middle School	Central Falls School District	Central Falls, Rhode Island
Delsesto Middle School	Providence School District	Providence, Rhode Island
Ferri Middle School	Johnston School District	Johnston, Rhode Island
Gallagher Middle School	Smithfield School District	Smithfield, Rhode Island
Goff Junior High School	Pawtucket School District	Pawtucket, Rhode Island
Greene Middle School	Providence School District	Providence, Rhode Island
Hopkins Middle School	Providence School District	Providence, Rhode Island
Lincoln Middle School	Lincoln School District	Lincoln, Rhode Island
Martin Middle School	East Providence School District	East Providence, Rhode Island
McCourt Middle School	Cumberland School District	Cumberland, Rhode Island
North Cumberland Middle School	Cumberland School District	Cumberland, Rhode Island
North Smithfield Middle School	North Smithfield School District	North Smithfield, Rhode Island
Riverside Middle School	East Providence School District	East Providence, Rhode Island
Scituate Middle School	Scituate School District	Scituate, Rhode Island
Stuart Middle School	Providence School District	Providence, Rhode Island
West Broadway Middle School	Providence School District	Providence, Rhode Island
Western Hills Middle School	Cranston School District	Cranston, Rhode Island
Williams Middle School	Providence School District	Providence, Rhode Island

== Elementary schools (kindergarten-5th grade unless otherwise noted) ==
School	District/School type	Location
Arlington School	Cranston School District	Cranston, Rhode Island
Ashton School	Cumberland School District	Cumberland, Rhode Island
Bailey School	Providence Public School District	Providence, Rhode Island
Barnes School	Johnston School District	Johnston, Rhode Island
Barrows School	Cranston School District	Cranston, Rhode Island
Brown Avenue School	Johnston School District	Johnston, Rhode Island
Callahan School	Burrillville School Department	Burrillville, Rhode Island
Carnevale School	Providence Public School District	Providence, Rhode Island
Centredale School	North Providence School District	North Providence, Rhode Island
Clayville School	Scituate School District	Scituate, Rhode Island
Community School	Cumberland School District	Cumberland, Rhode Island
Curtis School	Pawtucket School District	Pawtucket, Rhode Island
D'Abate School	Providence Public School District	Providence, Rhode Island
DuTemple School	Cranston School District	Cranston, Rhode Island
Eden Park School	Cranston School District	Cranston, Rhode Island
Edgewood Highland School	Cranston School District	Cranston, Rhode Island
Feinstein School (2 campuses)	Providence Public School District	Providence, Rhode Island
Fogarty School	Providence Public School District	Providence, Rhode Island
Fogarty Memorial School	Glocester Elementary School District	Glocester, Rhode Island
Fortes School	Providence Public School District	Providence, Rhode Island
Frank Spaziano School/Annex	Providence Public School District	Providence, Rhode Island
Garden City School	Cranston School District	Cranston, Rhode Island
Garvin Memorial School	Cumberland School District	Cumberland, Rhode Island
Gladstone Street School	Cranston School District	Cranston, Rhode Island
Glen Hills School	Cranston School District	Cranston, Rhode Island
Gregorian School	Providence Public School District	Providence, Rhode Island
Halliwell School	North Smithfield School District	North Smithfield, Rhode Island
Hennessy School	East Providence School District	East Providence, Rhode Island
Hope School	Scituate School District	Scituate, Rhode Island
Kennedy School (Providence)	Providence Public School District	Providence, Rhode Island
Kent Heights School	East Providence School District	East Providence, Rhode Island
King School	Providence Public School District	Providence, Rhode Island
Kizirian School	Providence Public School District	Providence, Rhode Island
LaPerche School	Smithfield School District	Smithfield, Rhode Island
Lauro School	Providence Public School District	Providence, Rhode Island
Levy School	Burrillville School Department	Burrillville, Rhode Island
Lincoln Central School	Lincoln Public Schools	Lincoln, Rhode Island
Lima School/Annex	Providence Public School District	Providence, Rhode Island
Lonsdale School	Lincoln Public Schools	Lincoln, Rhode Island
McLaughlin Cumberland Hill School	Cumberland School District	Cumberland, Rhode Island
Messer School	Providence Public School District	Providence, Rhode Island
North Scituate School	Scituate School District	Scituate, Rhode Island
North Smithfield School	North Smithfield School District	North Smithfield, Rhode Island
Northern Lincoln School	Lincoln Public Schools	Lincoln, Rhode Island
Norton School	Cumberland School District	Cumberland, Rhode Island
Oak Lawn School	Cranston School District	Cranston, Rhode Island
Old County Road School	Smithfield School District	Smithfield, Rhode Island
Olney School	North Providence School District	North Providence, Rhode Island
Orchard Farms School	Cranston School District	Cranston, Rhode Island
Orlo Avenue School	East Providence School District	East Providence, Rhode Island
Peters School	Cranston School District	Cranston, Rhode Island
Pleasant View School (Providence)	Providence Public School District	Providence, Rhode Island
Pleasant View School (Smithfield)	Smithfield School District	Smithfield, Rhode Island
Raíces Dual Language Academy	Central Falls School District	Central Falls, Rhode Island
Reservoir School	Providence Public School District	Providence, Rhode Island
Risk School	Central Falls School District	Central Falls, Rhode Island
Saylesville School	Lincoln Public Schools	Lincoln, Rhode Island
Silver Spring School	East Providence School District	East Providence, Rhode Island
Stadium School	Cranston School District	Cranston, Rhode Island
Steere Farm School	Burrillville School Department	Burrillville, Rhode Island
Stone Hill School	Cranston School District	Cranston, Rhode Island
Thornton School	Johnston School District	Johnston, Rhode Island
Veazie School	Providence Public School District	Providence, Rhode Island
Veterans Memorial School	Central Falls School District	Central Falls, Rhode Island
Waddington School	East Providence School District	East Providence, Rhode Island
Waterman School	Cranston School District	Cranston, Rhode Island
Webster School	Providence Public School District	Providence, Rhode Island
West School	Providence Public School District	Providence, Rhode Island
West Glocester School	Glocester Elementary School District	Glocester, Rhode Island
Whiteknact School	East Providence School District	East Providence, Rhode Island
Winsor Hill School	Johnston School District	Johnston, Rhode Island
Woonsocket School	Woonsocket School District	Woonsocket, Rhode Island
Young & Woods School	Providence Public School District	Providence, Rhode Island

== Other schools ==
School	Religion	Grades served	Location	Single-sex/Co-educational
Bishop McVinney School	Diocese of Providence	PK-8	Providence, Rhode Island	Co-educational
Blessed Sacrament School	Diocese of Providence	PK-8	Providence, Rhode Island	Co-educational
Community Preparatory School	Independent	4-8	Providence, Rhode Island	Co-educational
Croft School	Independent	K-5	Providence, Rhode Island	Co-educational
DeLaSalle Middle School	Diocese of Providence	6-8	Providence, Rhode Island	Co-educational
French-American School of Rhode Island	Independent	PK-8	Providence, Rhode Island	Co-educational
Good Shepherd Regional Catholic School	Diocese of Providence	PK-8	Woonsocket, Rhode Island	Co-educational
Gordon School	Independent	PK-8	East Providence, Rhode Island	Co-educational
Grace School	Independent	K-8	Providence, Rhode Island	Co-educational
Henry Barnard School	Independent	PK-5	Providence, Rhode Island	Co-educational
Immaculate Conception Regional Catholic School	Diocese of Providence	PK-8	Cranston, Rhode Island	Co-educational
Jewish Community Day School of Rhode Island	Jewish	PK-5	Providence, Rhode Island	Co-educational
La Salle Academy	Diocese of Providence	6-12	Providence, Rhode Island	Co-educational
The Lincoln School	Quaker	K-12	Providence, Rhode Island	All-female
Mercymount Country Day School	Diocese of Providence	PK-8	Cumberland, Rhode Island	Co-educational
Moses Brown School	Quaker	PK-12	Providence, Rhode Island	Co-educational
Mount Saint Charles Academy	Diocese of Providence	6-12	Woonsocket, Rhode Island	Co-educational
New England Academy of Torah	Jewish	9-12	Providence, Rhode Island	All-female
Ocean State Montessori School	Independent	PK-6	East Providence, Rhode Island	Co-educational
Overbrook Academy	Diocese of Providence	6-9	Greenville, Rhode Island	All-female
Providence Country Day School	Independent	5-12	East Providence, Rhode Island	Co-educational
Providence Hebrew Day School	Jewish	PK-8	Providence, Rhode Island	Co-educational
Sacred Heart School	Diocese of Providence	PK-8	East Providence, Rhode Island	Co-educational
St. Augustine School	Diocese of Providence	PK-8	Providence, Rhode Island	Co-educational
St. Cecilia School	Diocese of Providence	PK-8	Pawtucket, Rhode Island	Co-educational
St. Margaret School	Diocese of Providence	PK-8	East Providence, Rhode Island	Co-educational
St. Mary Academy - Bay View	Diocese of Providence	PK-12	East Providence, Rhode Island	All-female
St. Mary School	Diocese of Providence	PK-8	Cranston, Rhode Island	Co-educational
St. Patrick Academy	Diocese of Providence	9-12	Providence, Rhode Island	Co-educational
Saint Paul School	Diocese of Providence	PK-8	Cranston, Rhode Island	Co-educational
St. Philip School	Diocese of Providence	PK-8	Smithfield, Rhode Island	Co-educational
St. Pius V School	Diocese of Providence	PK-8	Providence, Rhode Island	Co-educational
St. Rocco School	Diocese of Providence	PK-8	Johnston, Rhode Island	Co-educational
St. Raphael Academy	Diocese of Providence	9-12	Pawtucket, Rhode Island	Co-educational
St. Theresa School	Diocese of Providence	PK-8	Pawtucket, Rhode Island	Co-educational
St. Thomas Regional STEAM Academy	Diocese of Providence	PK-8	Providence, Rhode Island	Co-educational
School One	Independent	9-12	Providence, Rhode Island	Co-educational
Trinity Christian Academy	Christian	PK-12	Johnston, Rhode Island	Co-educational
Wheeler School	Independent	PK-12	Providence, Rhode Island	Co-educational
