= Juanita Sánchez =

Social worker and social activist

- Born: Dominican Republic
- Died: 1992
- Monuments: Juanita Sanchez Educational Complex
- Occupation: Social worker
- Years active: 1970–1992
- Known for: The Rainbow Center

Juanita Sánchez (died 1992) was an American social worker and social activist in Providence, Rhode Island. The Juanita Sánchez Multi-Services Center and Juanita Sánchez Educational Complex in Providence were named after her.

== Career ==
Sánchez was a health care outreach worker at the Allen Berry Health Center in Providence. In her role, she improved Latino immigrants' access to healthcare and education in Rhode Island. Sánchez founded The Rainbow Center out of Hope High School to offer teenage parents support and assist them with staying in school.

== Impact ==
Sánchez was a "strong driving force in the informal organization of the Latino community during the 1970s and 80s", according to Nuestras Raices Latino Oral History Project of Rhode Island. In 2016, Marta V. Martinez was quoted in The Providence Journal stating, “More than 20 years after her death, Juanita Sánchez still evokes powerful memories, smiles, tears, advocacy and the act of giving to Latino issues in Rhode Island."

After Sánchez's death in 1992, the Juanita Sánchez Multi-Services Center was opened as an office space for Latino organizations in Rhode Island.

In 1993, The Juanita Sánchez Community Fund was created at the Rhode Island Foundation. It was the first community endowed fund for Latinos in Rhode Island. Over $100,000 in grants from the fund have been awarded so far.

In 2004, a high school in Providence was named Juanita Sánchez Educational Complex. It is the only school building in Rhode Island to be named after a Latina. 85 percent of students at the school are eligible for a free or reduced-price lunch. The school has a student run food pantry.
