= Victor Parra (soccer) =

American soccer player

Victor Emilio Parra
Personal information
- Full name: Victor Emilio Parra
- Date of birth: April 23, 1993 (age 33)
- Place of birth: Central Falls, Rhode Island, United States
- Height: 1.82 m (6 ft 0 in)
- Position: Attacking midfielder

Team information
- Current team: Stallion Laguna F.C.

Youth career
- 2006–2008: Bayside United FC
- 2008–2009: Bruno United
- 2009–2012: Greater Boston Bolts

College career
Years	Team	Apps	(Gls)
2012–2013	Monroe College	23	(16)
2014–2016	San Jose State University	23	(1)

Senior career*
Years	Team	Apps	(Gls)
2017–2019	C.C.D. Minas de Argozelo	5	
2018	FC Famalicão		
2018–2019	Turlock Cal Express	2	(2)
2020	Global F.C.		
2021	Bay Cities FC	3	(1)
2024–	Stallion Laguna F.C.		

International career
- USA U-14
2017	Portugal		
2024	Philippines		
- * Club domestic league appearances and goals

Victor Emilio Parra (born April 23, 1993) is an American professional soccer player who plays as an attacking midfielder for Stallion Laguna F.C. in the Philippines Football League.

== Early life and education ==
Victor Parra was born in Central Falls, Rhode Island, and raised by a single mother with two siblings. He developed an interest in soccer during his childhood and played for Central Falls High School. He received a full athletic scholarship to San Jose State University, where he double majored in hospitality and international business.

He graduated from San Jose State University in December 2016 as the class valedictorian and was the first NCAA Division 1 student-athlete at the university to hold this title.

== Career ==
=== College ===
Victor Emilio Parra played for the Monroe College Mustangs from 2012 to 2013 under coach Marcus Dibarnardo. During his tenure, the team recorded a record of 20 wins, 4 losses, and 4 draws. In 2012, the team reached the NJCAA Northeast District finals and was ranked No. 15 in the nation. In 2013, Parra scored 15 goals and provided seven assists, concluding his time at Monroe with a total of 18 goals and nine assists.

In 2014, Parra transferred to the Spartan soccer team, where he received starting assignments in matches against Bradley, Western Illinois, Pacific, and Utah Valley. He recorded a season-high four shots in a match against Stanford. In 2015, he participated in 13 matches, earning one starting assignment. Parra scored his first major college goal against UMKC, which was also the game-winning goal, and provided an assist against Grand Canyon, accumulating a total of 443 minutes of playing time that season.

Parra subsequently joined San Jose State University, playing for the Spartans men's soccer team. During his time at San Jose State University, he was recruited by East Bay FC Stompers, joining the team for the 2016 and 2017 seasons in the National Premier Soccer League.

While with the Stompers, Parra played primarily as a winger or striker. He scored two goals in a 4-2 victory against Sacramento Gold FC during the 2016 NPSL season, contributing to the team's first playoff appearance in NPSL history. His performance during the season led to an invitation to the NPSL Player Showcase, where he represented the All-West team.

Victor Parra played for several youth clubs during his early soccer career, including Bayside United FC from 2006 to 2008, Bruno United from 2008 to 2009, and the Greater Boston Bolts from 2009 to 2012.

=== Professional ===
Parra began his professional soccer career in Portugal, signing with Argozelo in the second division LigaPro in 2017, where he played for two seasons. In February 2018, Parra signed a professional contract with FC Famalicão in the Ledman Liga Pro, the second tier of Portuguese football.

Parra played two games for the Turlock Cal Express during the 2018-19 MASL season, scoring two goals and providing one assist, with a 50% shot accuracy. In 2019, he joined the California Express in the Major Arena Soccer League. While with California Express, Victor was selected to represent the United States men's indoor national soccer team and played in a match against Mexico in 2019. He has played in various positions, including striker, forward, and winger.

In 2020, Victor Parra signed a professional contract with Global F.C., a first-division club in the Philippines Football League. However, due to complications arising from the COVID-19 pandemic, he was unable to participate in the league.

In September 2022, he was selected to represent Colombia in the 2023 Indoor World Cup. In September 2024, he joined Stallion Laguna F.C. as part of the 2024–25 Philippines Football League season.

== Personal life ==
Parra has established a nonprofit in California that supports underprivileged youth. He appeared on the reality TV show Every Street United in 2014, which sought to find top street soccer players worldwide and aired on ESPN and Xbox Live.

== Honors ==
He was inducted into the Central Falls High School Athletic Hall of Fame in 2023.
