= Riverside Middle School =

Riverside Middle School may refer to:

- Riverside Middle School - New Castle, Colorado - Garfield School District Re-2
- Riverside Middle School - Evans, Georgia - Columbia County School System
- Riverside Middle School - Dearborn Heights, Michigan - Crestwood School District
- Riverside Middle School - East Providence, Rhode Island - East Providence School District
- Riverside Middle School - Greer, South Carolina - Greenville County Schools
- Riverside Middle School - El Paso, Texas - Ysleta Independent School District
- Riverside Middle School - Fort Worth, Texas - Fort Worth Independent School District
- Riverside Middle School - San Benito, Texas - San Benito Consolidated Independent School District
