= Providence Public School District =

School district in Rhode Island, United States

Location
- 797 Westminster St; Providence, RI 02903 United States
- Coordinates: 41.818061°N 71.421433°W

District information
- Type: Public
- Motto: Opening doors to our children's futures
- Grades: K-12
- Established: 1977
- Superintendent: Javier Montañez
- Schools: 43 schools, 2 annexes and 2 charter schools, 2 transitions
- NCES District ID: 4400900

Students and staff
- Students: 24,454
- Teachers: 1954
- Staff: 258
- Student–teacher ratio: 27:1

Other information
- Website: providenceschools.org

The Providence Public School Department is the administrative force behind the primary public school district of Providence, Rhode Island. As of July 2022, it serves about 21,700 students in pre-K through 12th grade. It has 21 elementary schools, seven middle schools and nine high schools, along with two public charter schools.

The Providence Public School District includes magnet schools at the middle and high school level, Nathanael Greene and Classical respectively. There are two separate centers for students with special needs. Two public charter schools, Time Squared Academy High School (K–12) and Textron Chamber of Commerce (9–12), are funded by GTECH Corporation and Textron respectively. Overall, the public high school graduation rate as of 2019 is 74%, which is below the statewide rate of 84% and the national average of 87%.

Providence Public Schools rank third when compared to public schools in New England. Worcester Public and Boston Public are ranked 1st and 2nd.

== History ==
Providence civic leader John Howland established a system of free public education by means of the School Act in 1828. During the 1830s and 1840s, that system grew and prospered, especially in Providence, owing to the exertions of Samuel Bridgham, Nathan Bishop, and Thomas Wilson Dorr. Education specialist Henry Barnard was recruited as the first state commissioner of education until 1849, with the aim of bringing the other towns to the high educational level which had been achieved by Providence. Barnard observed that "the city of Providence has already gained to itself an extended reputation and made itself a bright example to many other cities."

== List of schools ==
Middle Schools

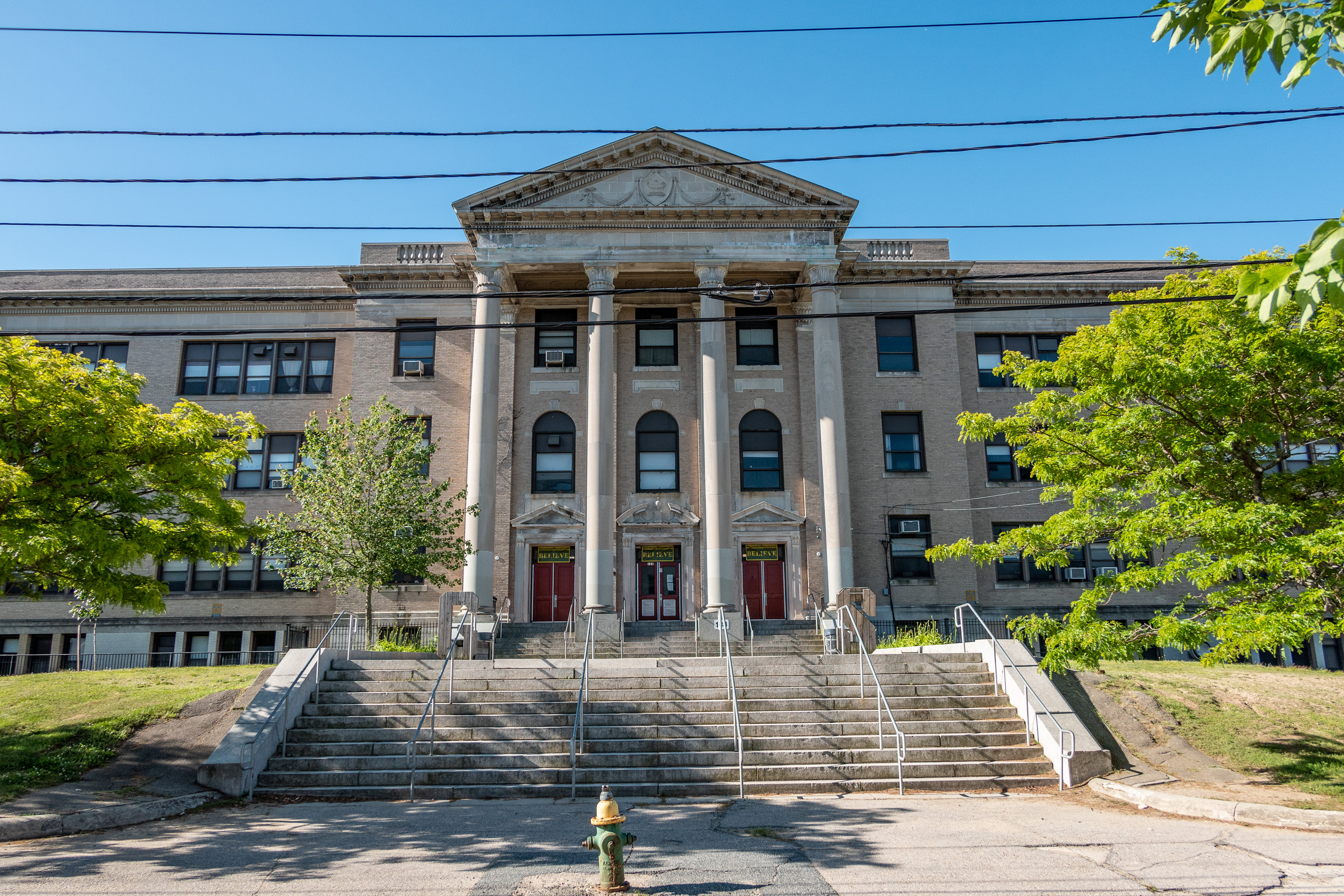
Gilbert Stuart Middle School

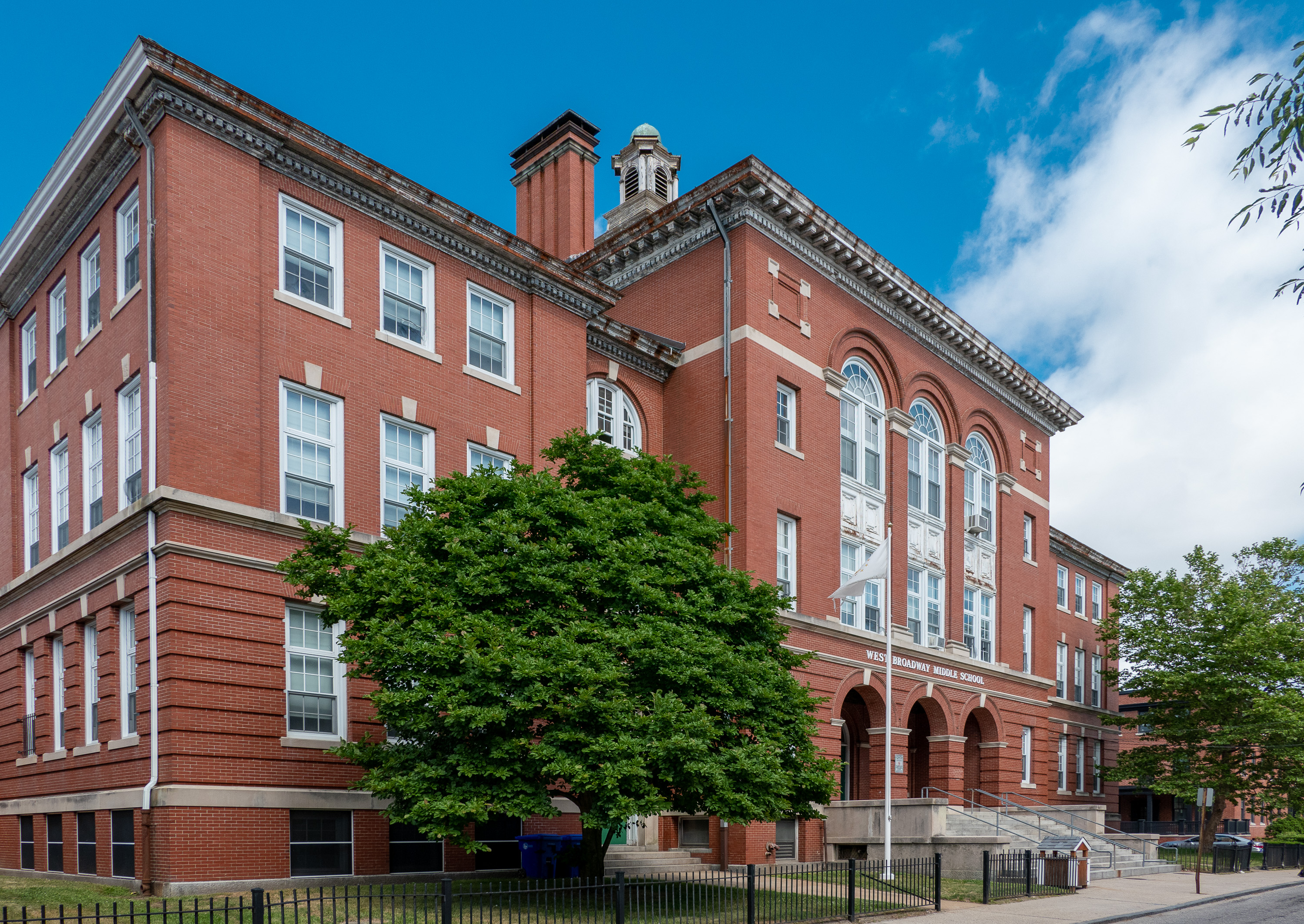
West Broadway Middle School

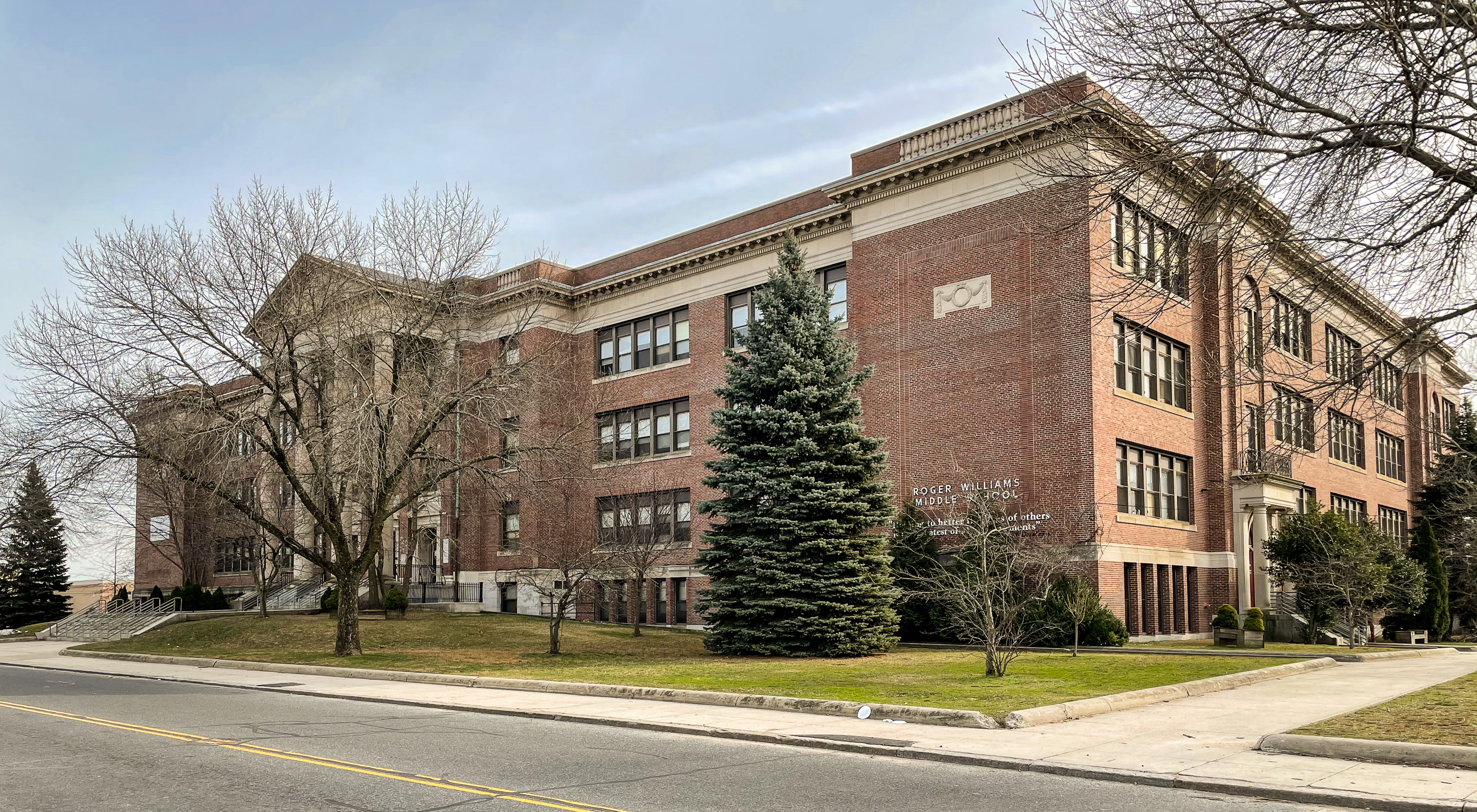
Roger Williams Middle School

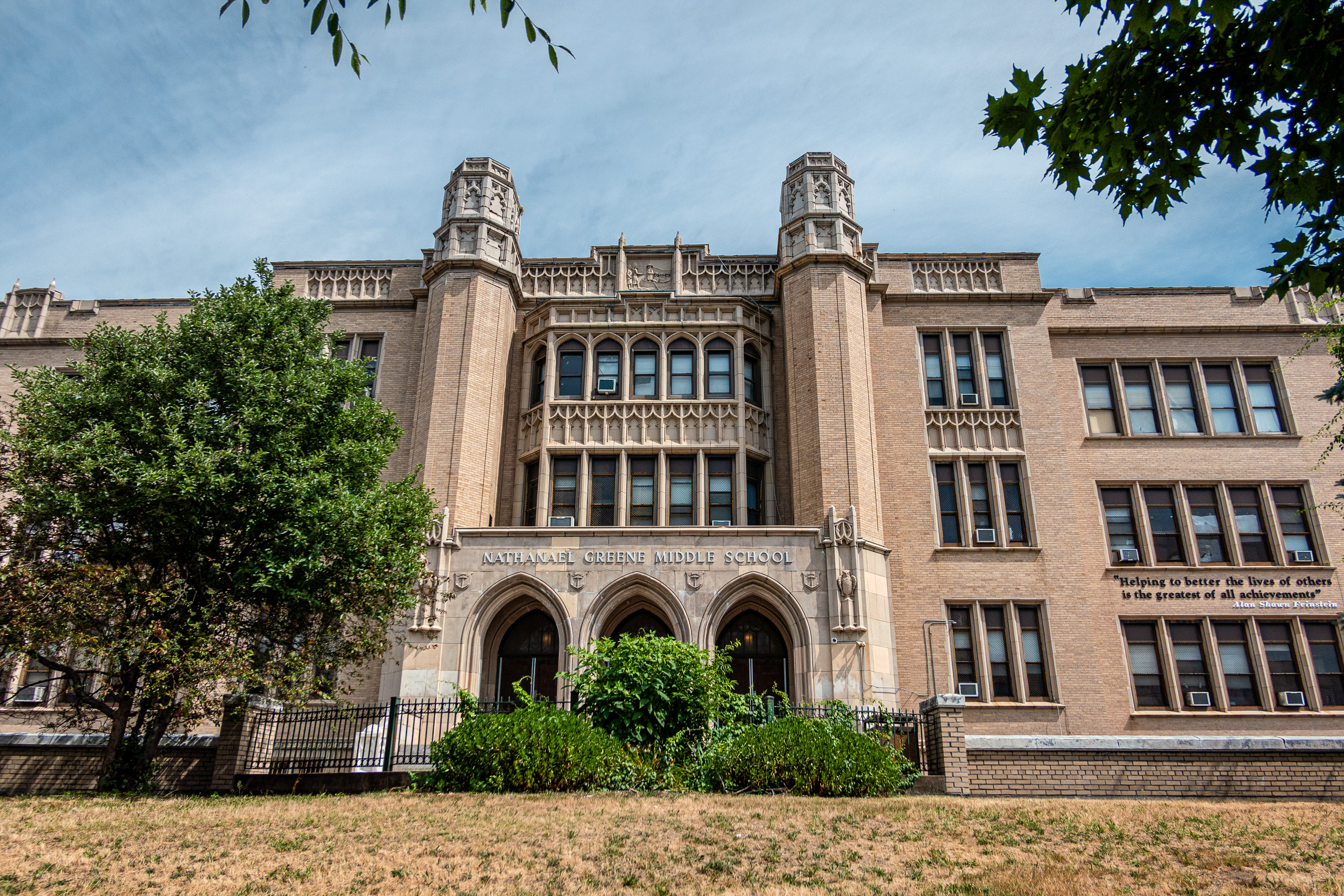
Nathanael Greene Middle School

=== Elementary schools ===
As of the 2024–2025 school year

- Bailey
- Carnevale
- D'Abate
- Feinstein at Sackett Street
- Fogarty
- Frank Spaziano & Annex
- Gregorian
- Robert F. Kennedy (formerly Nelson St. School)
- King
- Kizirian
- Leviton Dual Language School
- Lima
- Lima Annex
- Asa Messer
- Pleasant View
- Reservoir
- Veazie
- Webster
- West
- Young & Woods
High Schools

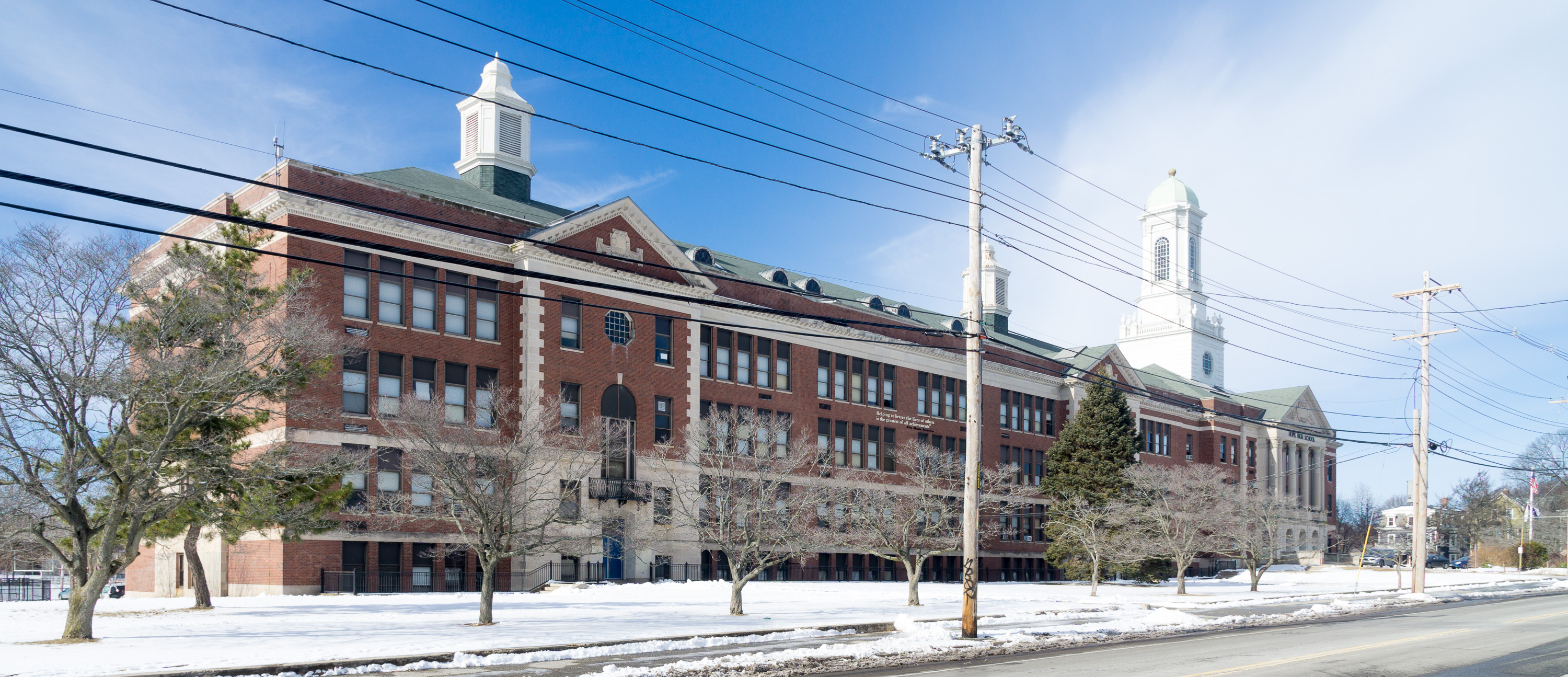
Hope High School

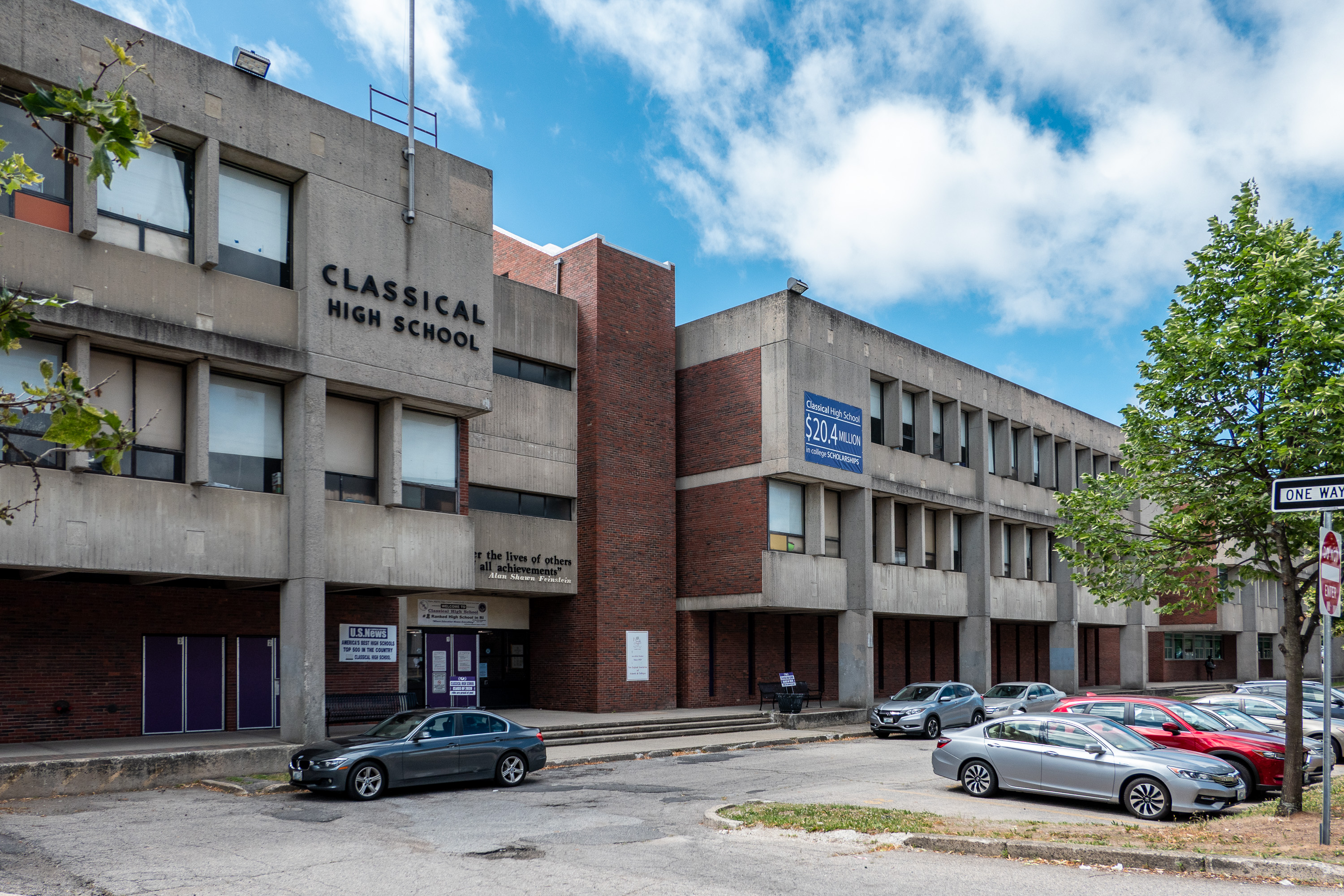
Classical High School

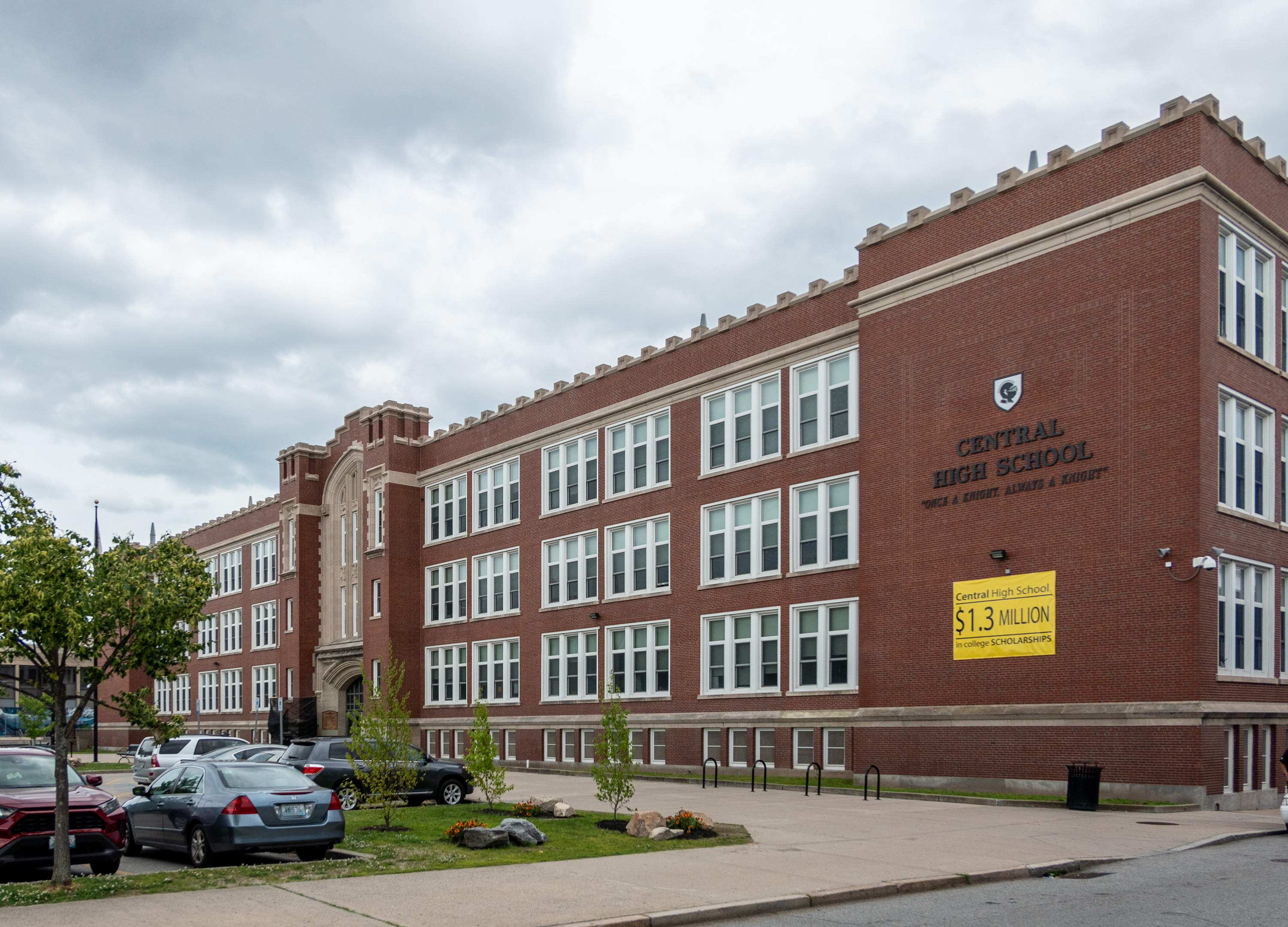
Central High School

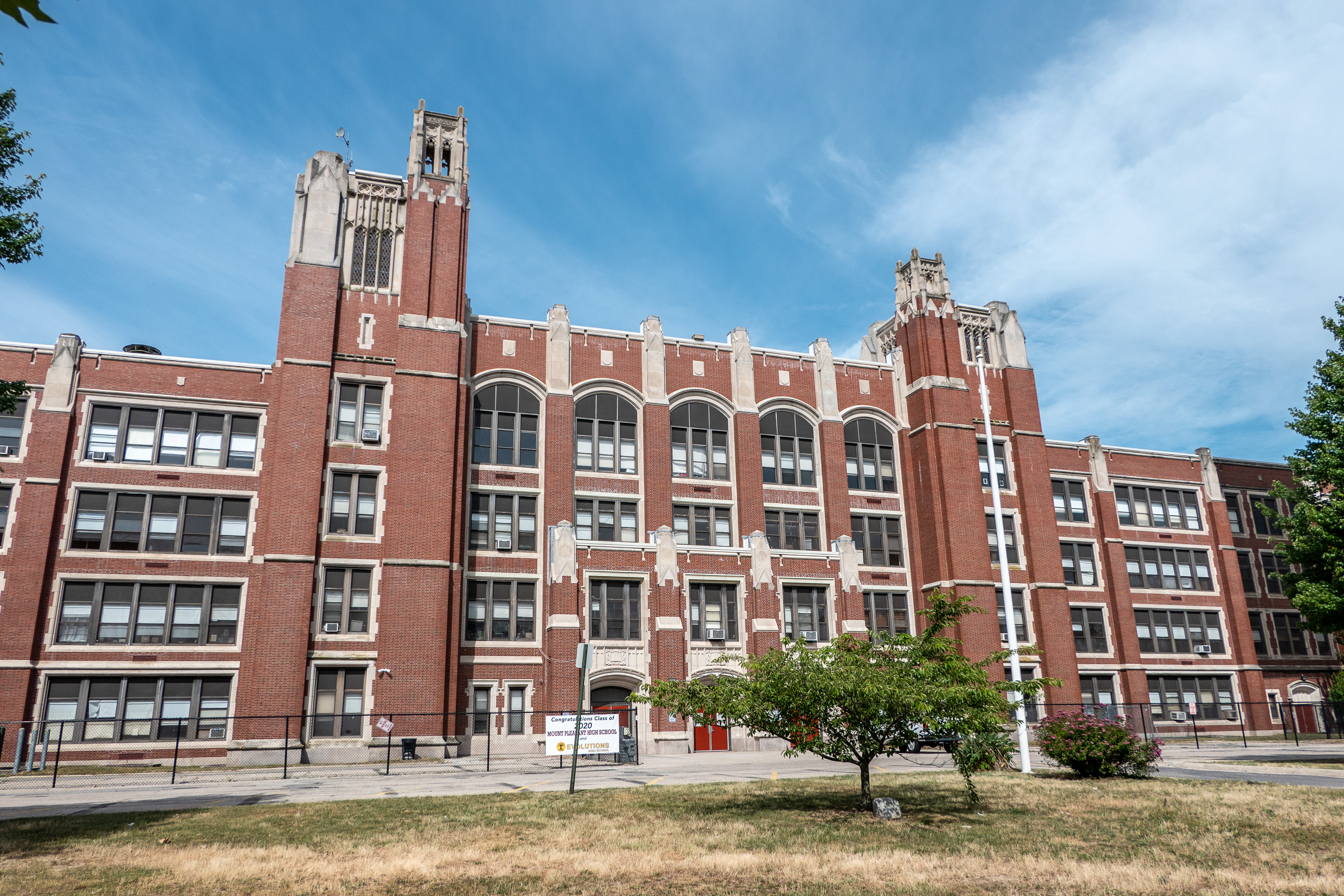
Mount Pleasant High School

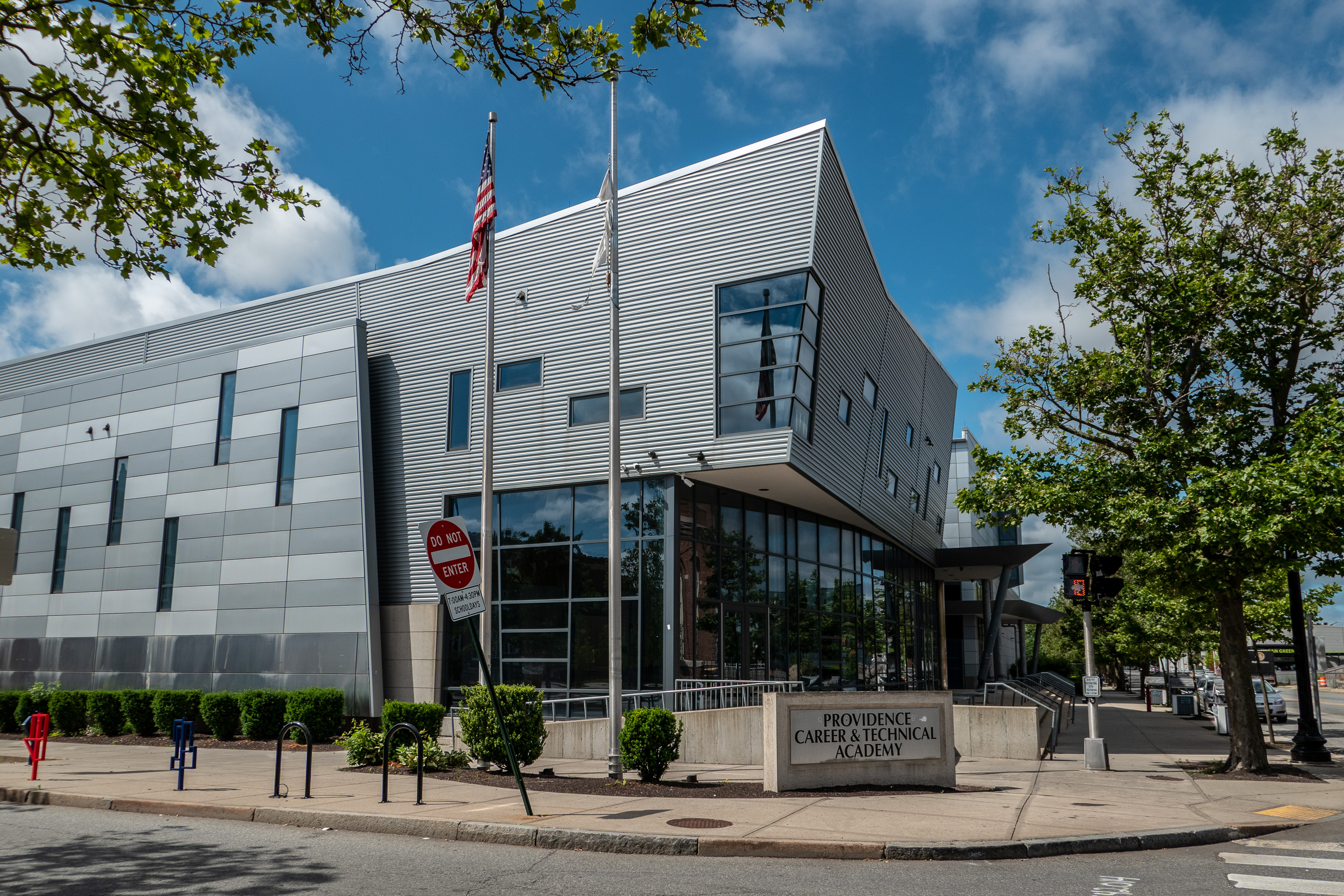
Providence Career & Technical Academy

=== Middle schools ===
As of the 2024–2025 school year

- Delsesto
- Esek Hopkins
- Gilbert Stuart
- Nathan Bishop
- Nathanael Greene
- Roger Willams
- West Broadway

=== High schools ===
As of the 2024–2025 school year

- 360 High School
- Classical
- Central
- E-Cubed Academy
- Hope
- Mount Pleasant
- Juanita Sanchez Complex
- Dr. Jorge Alvarez High School
- Providence Career Tech Academy

=== Charter schools ===
- Textron Chamber of Commerce Providence Public Charter School
- The Times2 Academy
- Highlander Charter School
- Paul Cuffee Charter School
- Achievement First

=== Centers servicing students with significant disabilities ===
- Harold A. Birch Vocational Program
- Hope High School Special Education

=== Former schools ===
- Brigham
- Fortes
- St. Charles Vocational Program
- Windmill Street School

=== Transition Programs ===
Special Education Students are 18-25 ages students some are disabilities on IEP/504 Plan

- Providence Autism School to Tomorrow Academy (PASTTA)
- Providence Transition Academy

== Student achievement ==
=== Not Making Adequate Yearly Progress ===
According to the 2010–2011 AYP Summary Reports 50% of schools in the district are making Adequate Yearly Progress. The district received the AYP Status of Not Making Adequate Yearly Progress for Elementary, Middle, and High Schools.

=== NECAP results ===
District NECAP results for 2015–16 were significantly below state averages.

Subject	School year	Percent proficient district	Percent proficient state
3rd Grade Math	2015–16	33%	56%
3rd Grade Reading	2013–14	47%	69%
4th Grade Math	2013–14	39%	63%
4th Grade Reading	2013–14	53%	70%
4th Grade Science	2015–16	17%	41%
5th Grade Math	2013–14	38%	61%
5th Grade Reading	2013–14	52%	74%
5th Grade Writing	2015–16	44%	64%
6th Grade Math	2013–14	31%	59%
6th Grade Reading	2013–14	45%	72%
7th Grade Math	2013–14	34%	59%
7th Grade Reading	2013–14	39%	69%
8th Grade Math	2013–14	34%	57%
8th Grade Reading	2013–14	48%	74%
8th Grade Writing	2013–14	32%	56%
8th Grade Science	2015–16	9%	30%
11th Grade Math	2016–17	30%	0%
11th Grade Reading	2013–14	61%	81%
11th Grade Writing	2013–14	48%	66%
11th Grade Science	2012–13	9%	30%

=== Graduation rates ===
Four-year graduation rate (students entering grade 9 in 2009–2010) (as reported by the Rhode Island Department of Education)

-	Year	District	State
Percent graduated within 4 Years	2012–13	71.4%	79.7%
Percent dropped out	2012–13	15.0%	9.1%
Percent received GED	2012–13	2.2%	2.9%
Percent still in school	2012–13	11.4%	8.3%

Five-year graduation rate (students entering grade 9 in 2008–2009) (as reported by the Rhode Island Department of Education)

Graduation rates	District	State
Percent graduated within 4 years	65.5%	77.3%
Percent graduated in 5 years	5.1%	3.6%
Percent graduated within 5 years	70.6%	80.9%

Historic graduation rate data (as reported by the district)

School year	Graduation rate
2005–06	71.01%
2004–05	72.98%
2003–04	65.60%
2002–03	65.70%

== Population ==
=== 2010–2011 school year ===
District data from 2010 to 2011 school year

==== Demographics ====
- 14,715 or 63% Hispanic
- 4,521 or 19% Black
- 2,175 or 9% White
- 1,237 or 5% Asian
- 676 or 3% Multi-racial
- 215 or 1% Native American

==== Free and reduced lunches ====
- Elementary: 82% free, 6% reduced, 4% paid
- Middle: 83% free, 6% reduced, 5% paid
- High: 74% free, 8% reduced, 7% paid
- Transition: 74% free, 8% reduced, 10% paid

Universal Free Lunch Program in all middle and high schools.

==== Special populations ====
Special Education

As of June 2022, 4,615 students in the district, ages 3–25, were identified as having disabilities.

Language programs

Program	Percent enrolled	Students			
ESL students	53%	2,084			
Bilingual students	37%	1,455			
Eligible not enrolled (ENE)	9%	362			
Dual language (included in bilingual totals)	3%	132			
Inclusion Regular (General Education IEP)	10%	1,000	Total in program	100%	10,000

994 (19%) - Exited students being monitored

5,344 - Total with monitoring & ENE

==== Staff: 3,242 ====
Number	Percentage	Staff position
1,895	59%	Teachers
855	23%	Aides, bus monitors, crossing guards
224	7%	Clerical support
222	7%	Other
76	2%	School administrators
33	1%	Certified personnel
33	1%	Non-certified support personnel

=== Teacher and administrator demographics from 2005–06 ===
==== Teaching staff demographics ====
- 82% White
- 7.6% Black
- 8.8% Hispanic
- 1.2% Asian / Pacific Islander
- 0.4% American Indian
- 27% Male | 73% Female

==== Administrator demographics ====
- 62% White
- 24% Black
- 12% Hispanic
- 2% Asian / Pacific Islander
- 0% American Indian
- 48% Male | 52% Female

=== Population changes over time ===
==== Student population data ====
Date	Student population
2018 October	23,955
2017 October	24,075
2016 October	23,983
2015 October	23,867
2014 October	23,907
2013 October	23,827

==== Changes in demographics ====
Date	Hispanic	Black	White	Asian	Multi-racial	Native American
March 2014	64.3%	17.5%	8.72%	4.99%	3.11%	0.86%
February 2011	63%	19%	9%	5%	3%	1%
March 2009	59%	22%	12%	6%	N/A	1%
January 2007	59%	22%	12%	6%	N/A	1%
January 2006	58%	22%	13%	6.3%	N/A	0.7%

== Finances ==
=== Bus Budget ===
FY 22-23 Bus Budget: $335.5M

=== Budget ===
FY 19-20 Budget: $395,628,201

=== Per-pupil spending ===
FY 17-18 spending per pupil: $15,305
