= Gideon Applegate =

American baseball player (1927–2016)

- Third baseman
- Born: Gideon Spence; December 2, 1927; Newport, Rhode Island, U.S.
- Died: December 4, 2016 (aged 89); Bennington, Vermont, U.S.
- Batted: Right Threw: Right

Negro league baseball debut
- 1945, for the New York Black Yankees

Last appearance
- 1945, for the New York Black Yankees
- Stats at Baseball Reference

Teams
- New York Black Yankees (1945)

Gideon Spence Applegate (December 2, 1927 – December 4, 2016), also known as John Spearman, was an American Negro league third baseman who played in the 1940s.

Applegate was born Gideon Spence, raised in Rumford, Rhode Island by adoptive parents and attended East Providence High School where he was one of only two African-American students and played several sports. While still in high school and playing under an assumed name, Applegate appeared for the New York Black Yankees in 1945. In three recorded games, he posted one hit in ten plate appearances. After graduating high school in 1945, he assumed his adoptive parents' surname, Applegate, and joined the United States Navy. After returning from the Navy, he enrolled at Brown University to play college football for the Brown Bears but was hurt before the season started and did not appear in any games. In 1949, he received a minor league contract from the Boston Braves. He graduated from Brown in 1952 and played in the minors until 1953.

After his baseball career, Brown worked as a cartographer for the Defense Mapping Agency, a youth football referee, a ski and tennis instructor and an equipment manager for Brown University athletics. Applegate's Negro league career and identity were unknown to baseball researchers until he and other local Negro leaguers were honored by the Pawtucket Red Sox at a ceremony in 2013. As of 2007, he was living in South Newfane, Vermont. He had suffered two strokes which left him partially paralyzed and impaired his speech and memory. He died in Bennington, Vermont on December 4, 2016, at the age of 89.
