= Al Russas =

American football player (1923–1995)

No. 86
- Positions: Tackle, defensive end

Personal information
- Born: August 22, 1923; Providence, Rhode Island, U.S.
- Died: February 14, 1995 (aged 71); Dearborn, Michigan, U.S.
- Listed height: 6 ft 2 in (1.88 m)
- Listed weight: 210 lb (95 kg)

Career information
- High school: Hope (Providence)
- College: Tennessee
- NFL draft: 1949: 13th round, 122nd overall pick

Career history
- Detroit Lions (1949)

Career NFL statistics
- Games played: 9
- Stats at Pro Football Reference

Alfred Victor Russas (August 22, 1923 – February 14, 1995) was an American professional football tackle and defensive end. He played for the Detroit Lions in 1949. He was selected with the 122nd overall pick in the 13th round by the Lions in the 1949 NFL Draft.
