= Central Falls High School =

Coordinates: 41°53′14.00″N 71°23′27.12″W

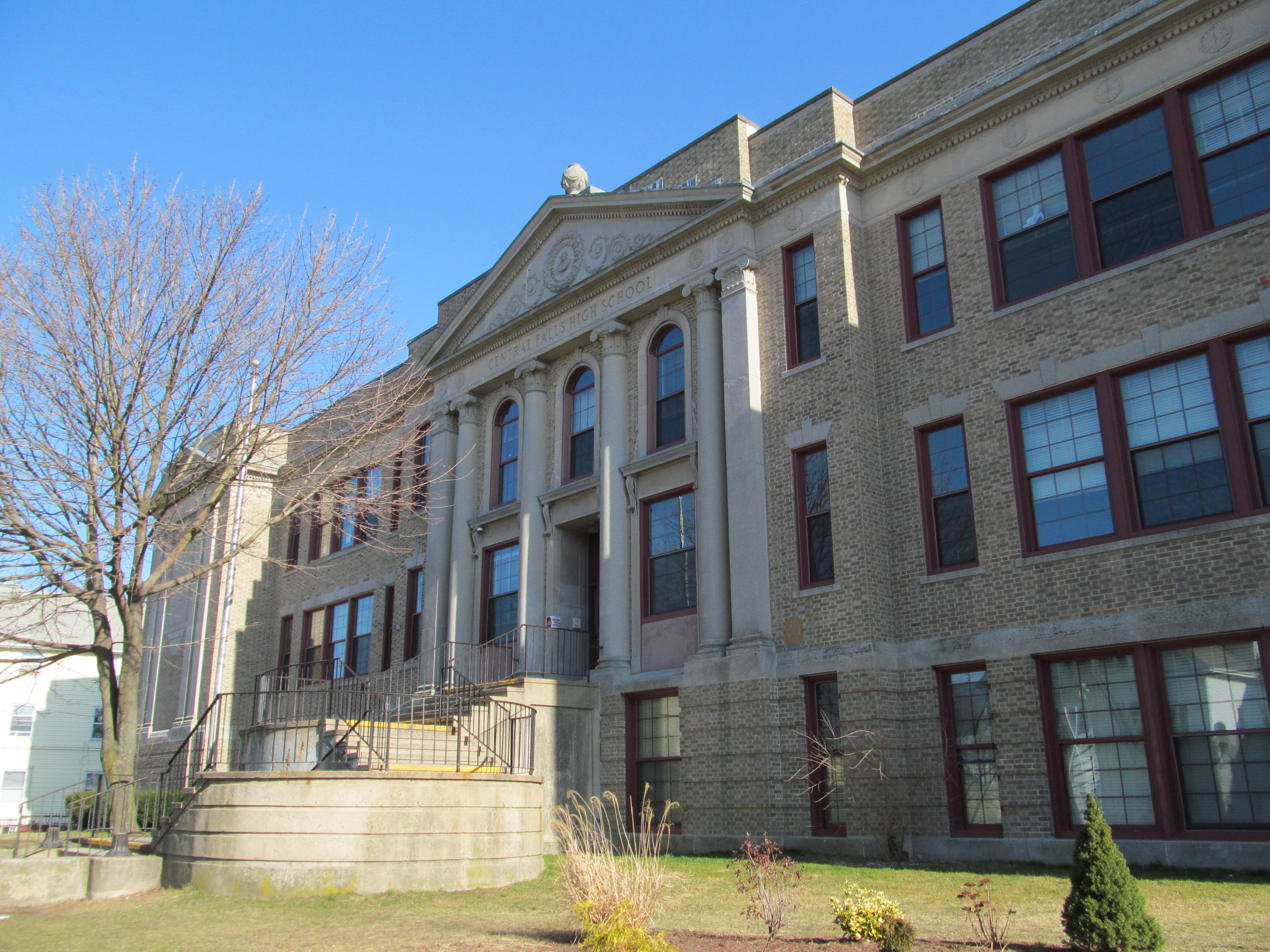

Location
- 24 Summer Street; Central Falls, Rhode Island; United States

Information
- Type: High school
- Teaching staff: 51.00 (FTE)
- Grades: 9-12
- Enrollment: 805 (2023-2024)
- Student to teacher ratio: 15.78
- Color
- Team name: Warriors
- Website: https://www.cfschools.net/o/central-falls-high-school

Central Falls High School (CFHS) is an urban Senior High School in Central Falls, Rhode Island that serves students from grades nine through twelve. It is centrally located within the city of Central Falls so that students are able to walk to and from school. It is a part of the Central Falls School District. Beyond academics, the high school offers a wide variety of co-curricular activities and clubs. Their co-curricular activities and clubs help their students develop their individual talents and achieve personal goals outside the classroom.

== History ==
In 2010, Central Falls High School was named among the six worst schools in the state. Due to this, the District was ordered to make improvements by selecting one of four reform plans outlined in federal law. The District and the Teachers' Union were in contract negotiations during this time. Talks between the two parties broke down when the Teachers' Union would not agree to a package of changes for the high school, including lengthening the school day, requiring teachers to offer more tutoring, get additional training and eat lunch with students once a week under the "transformation model." To meet the deadline for choosing the model and because of a Rhode Island State Law that requires layoff notifications to be given to certified staff prior to March 1, the superintendent chose the "turnaround model." The turnaround model required a district to fire the entire staff (teachers and administrators). They may rehire up to 50% of the teachers for the beginning of the next school year. The teachers union sued the school district challenging the requirement that teachers must reapply for their jobs.

More controversy began when President Obama weighed-in on the teacher firings. Eventually, both parties agreed to resume talks and in May 2010, the teachers were rehired once both parties agreed on a Settlement Agreement. At the time when this was happening the school had a graduation rate of around 50%, and 7% of 11th-graders were proficient in math in 2009. In 2012, the high school's graduation rate significantly increased to 71% and was highlighted by the Rhode Island Department of Education.

== Chess team ==
Central Falls maintains a highly regarded chess team, which has represented the State of Rhode Island in the United States Chess Federation National High School Championship six times. The team gained national mainstream attention in 2013 when actor Alec Baldwin donated $2,500 to cover their costs of again attending the National Championship. Actress Viola Davis, who grew up in Central Falls, also donated and helped raise money for the team.

== Notable alumni ==
- Lincoln Almond, Governor of Rhode Island
- Viola Davis, actress
- James Diossa, mayor of Central Falls and Rhode Island General Treasurer
- Tiny the Terrible, professional wrestler and politician
