= Providence Hebrew Day School =

Coordinates: 41.843750°N 71.392821°W

Information
- School type: Jewish day school
- Established: 1946; 80 years ago
- Dean: Menachem Weissman
- Grades: K-8

Providence Hebrew Day School (commonly referred to as "PHDS") is a co-educational K-8 school and the oldest Jewish day school in Rhode Island. The school was founded in 1946, and moved to its current location on Elmgrove Avenue on the East Side of Providence in 1962. The current dean of PHDS is Rabbi Menachem Weissman. Rabbi Mordechai Nissel was the school's dean from March 1997 through July 2003. It is affiliated with Orthodox Judaism, but enrolls students who are Jewish of other denominations as well. It is affiliated with New England Academy of Torah, a girls-only high school. High school students from outside of Providence have the option to board with host families during the school year.
