= Dr. Harry L. Halliwell School =

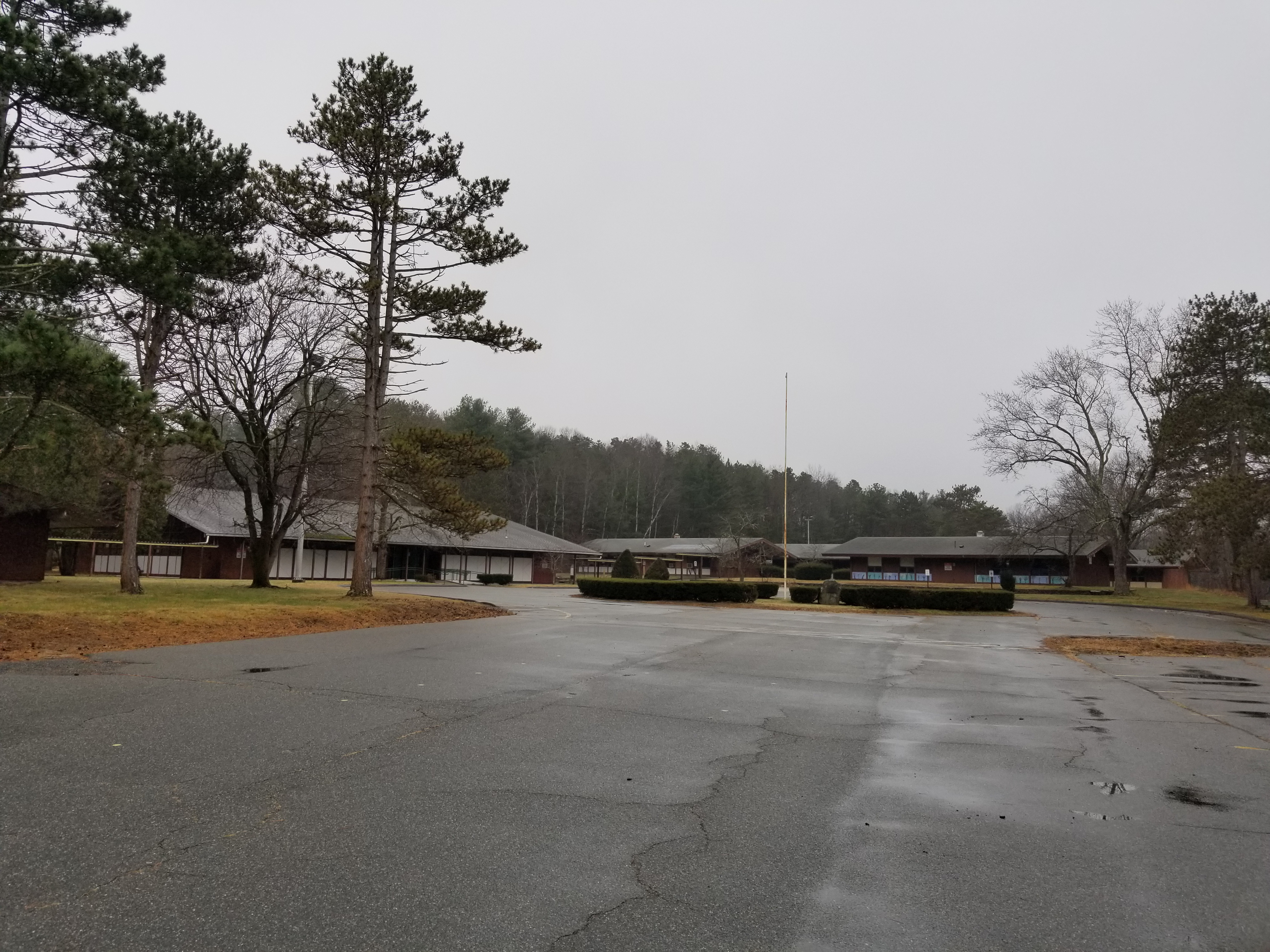
- Halliwell School in 2021

Location
- 358 Victory Hwy; Slatersville, Rhode Island 02876; United States
- Coordinates: 42.001740°N 71.567044°W

Information
- Type: Public
- Established: 1958
- School district: North Smithfield School District
- Principal: Jennifer Daigneault
- Grades: 3-5
- Colors: Green and Gold
- Mascot: Northmen
- Website: Halliwell website

Dr. Harry L. Halliwell School is an elementary school in the Slatersville village of North Smithfield, Rhode Island, USA (in Providence County).

== History ==
The Halliwell School was constructed in 1957 on the grounds of a former sheep farm and was named after local school pediatrician, Dr. Harry Halliwell, who died at age thirty-two from polio after treating polio stricken children in the 1950s. Prior to the completion of the Halliwell school, North Smithfield students attended Kendall Dean School in Slatersville. The Halliwell school closed in 2019 when a new addition was completed on the North Smithfield Elementary School. The Halliwell School grounds are currently the location of the North Smithfield Community Garden and a playground.

== See also ==
- Schools in Rhode Island
