= Time Squared Academy =

Times^{2} STEM Academy
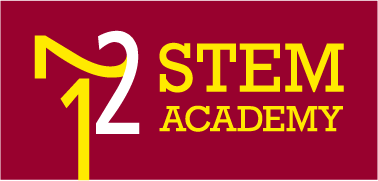

Location
- 50 Fillmore Street; Providence, Rhode Island 02908; United States; 41.838531°N 71.422170°W

Information
- School type: Public Charter school
- School district: Providence Public School District
- CEEB code: 400144
- Director: Rudolph Moseley
- Teaching staff: 40 (FTE) (as of 2014–15)
- Grades: K–12
- Enrollment: 650 (as of 2014–15)
- Student to teacher ratio: 16.25 (as of 2014–15)
- Colors: Burgundy and gold
- Slogan: To Unite, Educate, and Succeed in the areas of Engineering, Mathematics, Science, and Technology
- Athletics: Volleyball, basketball, soccer, cheer, dance, track
- Mascot: Bald Eagle
- Nickname: Eagles
- Website: http://times2.org/

Times^{2} STEM Academy is a charter school in Providence, Rhode Island that specializes in teaching science, technology, engineering, and mathematics.

== Current ==
The elementary, middle school and high school (grades K–12) was established in 1998. It uses standards-based instruction and computer technology to teach science and mathematics. Algebra I and general science are taught to eighth grade students.

High school students are introduced to project-based learning – for example at the laboratory sciences at Providence College, a lead higher education partner. Seniors undertake internships in engineering, math, science, technology, and enrichment courses at local colleges and universities.

The current elementary principal is Glenn Piros who joined in August 2013. He replaced Tom Lombardi who had replaced Antonio DiManna, who was principal until June 2011. The current executive director is Dr. Rudy Moseley, who joined in October 2015.

== Educational program ==
Students are taught using practices such as student-generated projects, enrichment initiatives, multiple assessments, and university and business partnerships.

Times^{2} STEM Academy uses the New Standards for curriculum development and implementation in its core subject areas. By using literacy and writing across all curricular areas, teachers build a foundation of learning that supports the school's program.

To assist the middle and upper school in identifying those competencies and qualities that are crucial for students to realize the school's mission, the administration and Board of Directors approved a K–5 Children's Academy. It is the feeder school to the middle and upper school.

The curriculum used in grades K–3 (and eventually K–5) and the middle and upper school emphasizes standards-based skills. Math Investigations teach students to integrate literacy skills with mathematics competencies.

Middle and high school teachers use the University of Chicago Math Project to develop modules that assist students in grades 6–12 to move through a mathematics sequence that culminates with AP Calculus in the 12th grade.

The science curriculum follows the standards established by the National Science Foundation. Using research to direct its decision, the Academy's Science Committee inverted its curriculum offerings where conceptual physics is offered to 9th graders, chemistry to sophomores, biology to juniors, and AP Physics to seniors.

== Enrichment program ==
Grades 9–12 are given formally scheduled after-school enrichment courses and activities, and Saturday Academics. These include Web Club, Robotics, Tech Club, ACE Program, Aviation Club, Chess Club, Mock Trial, Yearbook, Studio Productions, Science Olympiad, and computer technology mini-courses such as Flowcharting, HTML, and Sketch Pad. Also, through work with scientists and experts in their field, students get a better understanding of what skills are needed and invested in certain careers.

Most after-school activities take place on Tuesday to Thursday afternoons. On Fridays, field trips, workshops, movies, or social events take place.
