= East Providence High School =

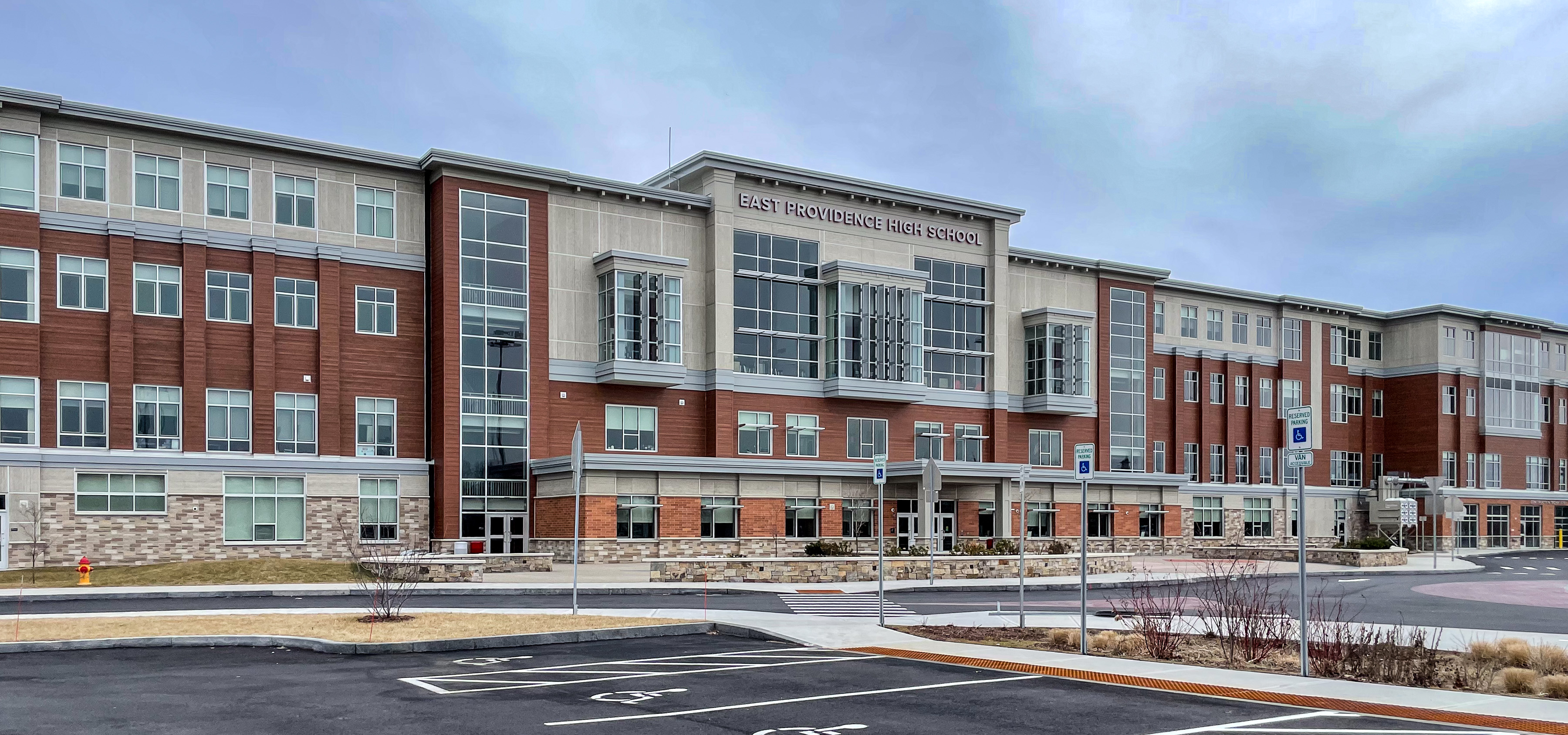

Location
- 2000 Pawtucket Avenue; East Providence, Rhode Island 02914; United States; 41.82°N 71.355°W

Information
- Type: Public Secondary
- Motto: Home of Townie Pride
- Established: 1884
- School district: East Providence School Department
- Principal: Bill Black
- Staff: 105
- Faculty: 150
- Grades: 9 to 12
- Enrollment: 1,659 (2022-2023)
- Student to teacher ratio: 15.78
- Colors: Crimson █ and White █
- Athletics: Townie Athletics
- Mascot: Townie
- Website: https://sites.google.com/epschoolsri.com/east-providence-high-school/home

East Providence High School is a public high school located in East Providence, Rhode Island. It instructs grade levels 9 through 12 and is operated by the East Providence School Department. As of the 2021–2022 year, there was an approximate student population of 1,500 students.

== History ==
=== 1952–2021 building ===
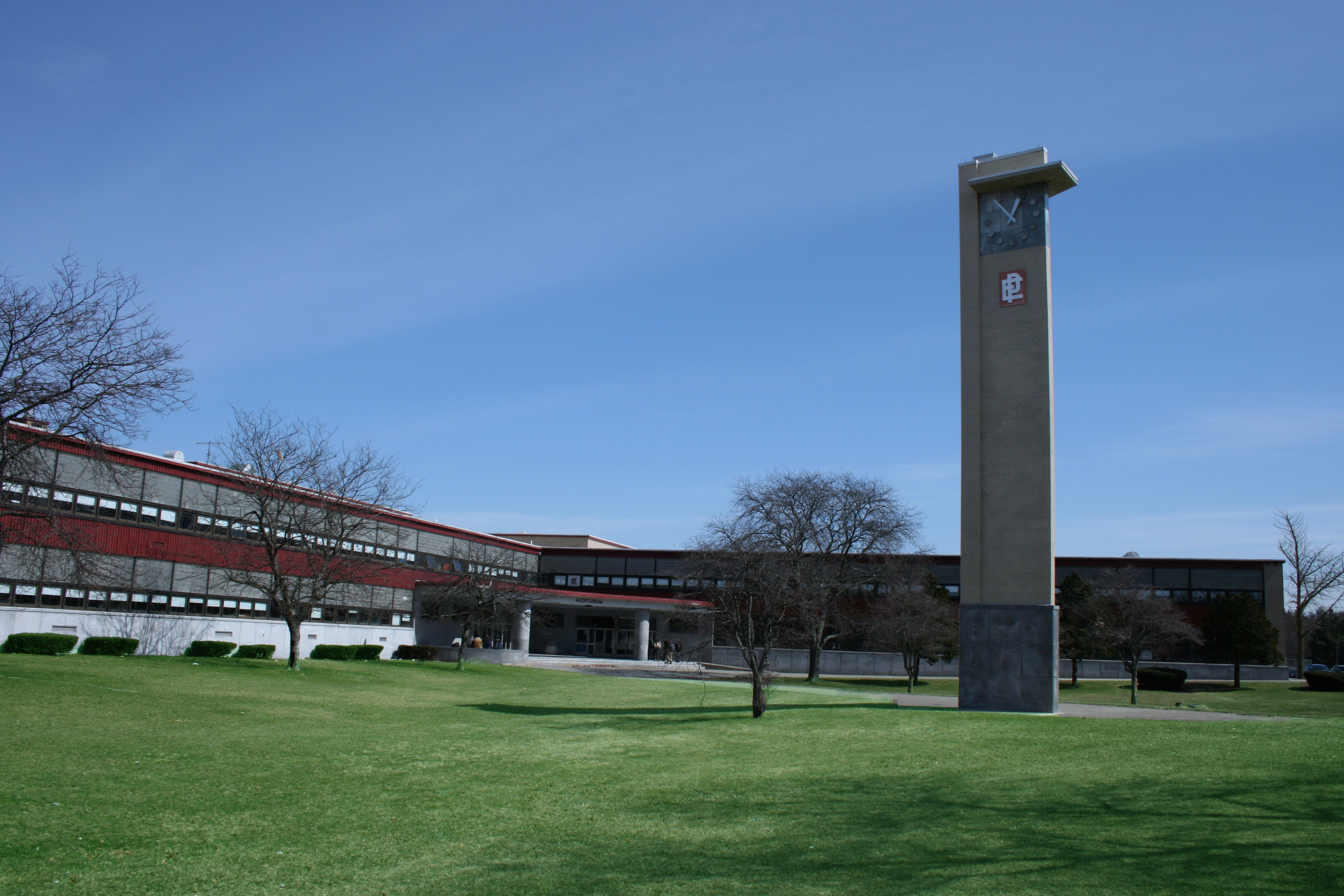
1952 building

The old East Providence High School opened its doors in 1952 as East Providence Senior High School. It replaced the original 1884 school building on Broadway that later became Central Junior High School. It was one of the first modern high schools built during the early 1950s that deviated from previous architectural styles. The construction included amenities such as a modernized cafeteria and auditorium to accommodate 1,000 occupants as well as a swimming pool with adjoining training and full size gymnasiums. During construction of the school, a clock tower was built on campus and has since become an iconic symbol of East Providence High. In 1999 a new wing was built as well as an expansion to the existing cafeteria. Neighboring the school is the East Providence Career and Technical Center which is contiguous with East Providence High School and is included in the study programs of some students.

=== 2021 building ===
June 5, 2019, ground was broken for the creation of a new high school. The building is expected to not exceed $189.5 million, and opened in 2021. The "304,000 square-foot, four-story facility, with capacity for 1,600 students in grades 9-12". The East Providence Career and Technical Center will be integrated into the new high school and the previous building will become an administration building. The new building features 45 classrooms, 10 science labs and two greenhouses with expanded work areas for the graphic design, culinary arts, allied health, and construction programs. There will be an "expanded and renovated athletics facilities, including a lighted football stadium with synthetic turf and halftime facilities, track, tennis courts, and fields for baseball, softball, soccer, and lacrosse."

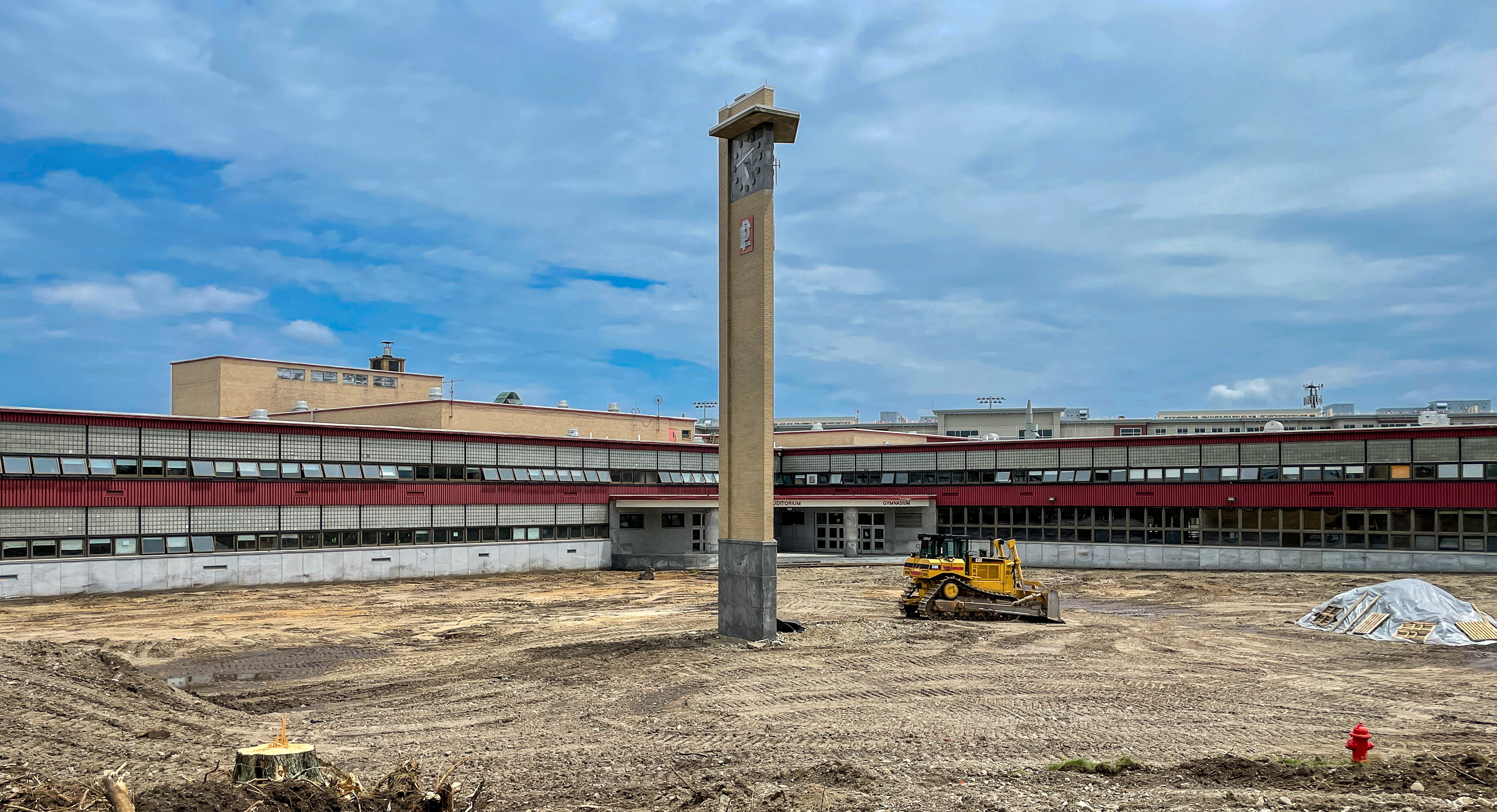
1952 building before demolition in 2021

The old building was demolished in August 2021. The new building opened in September 2021, during the COVID-19 pandemic, and features an advanced air filtration system in addition to new classrooms, cafeteria, auditoriums and athletic fields.

== Enrollment characteristics ==
=== Enrollment by grade ===
9th Grade - 466

10th Grade - 393

11th Grade - 398

12th Grade - 328

=== Enrollment by race/identity ===
American Indian/Alaskan Native - 18

Asian - 13

Black - 188

Hispanic - 181

Native Hawaiian/Pacific Islander - 1

White - 1,051

Two or More Races (Mixed) - 133

== Activities ==
East Providence High School's Townie Athletics consists of various seasonal sport teams along with seasonal after-school activities and clubs. East Providence High School includes the following sports and activities.

=== Fall activities ===
- Football Cheer-leading
- Marching Band and Color Guard
- Boys Cross Country
- Girls Cross Country
- Girls Soccer
- Boys Soccer
- Girls Tennis
- Girls Volleyball

=== Winter activities ===
- Boys Basketball
- Girls Basketball
- Hockey/Wrestling Cheer-leading
- Boys Indoor Track
- Girls Indoor Track
- Swimming
- Wrestling
- Hockey

=== Spring activities ===
- Baseball
- Golf
- Boys Outdoor Track
- Girls Outdoor Track
- Softball
- Boys Tennis
- Boys Volleyball
- Boys Lacrosse
- Girls Lacrosse

=== Other activities ===
- Cyber Patriot
- Choral Ensemble
- Fashion Club
- Talent Show
- DECA
- Student Council
- Band (Marching, wind ensemble, Concert, freshman, and Jazz)
- Book Club
- Chess Club
- Choraleers
- Crimson Yearbook
- Environmental Club
- Flag Corps
- French Club
- Freshman Chorus
- Gay-Straight Alliance
- International Club
- Meistersingers
- Musical
- National Honor Society
- Photography Club
- Portuguese Club
- Rhode Island Honor Society
- Rhode Island Skills USA
- Spanish Club
- The Townie Newspaper
- The Townie Volunteer Corps
- Youth Alive
- Young Democrats Club
- Young Republicans Club

== Alumni ==
- Gregg Amore, politician
- Gideon Applegate, professional baseball player
- David Franklin, scientist, entrepreneur
- Claudia Jordan, case holder on Deal or No Deal
- Jennifer Lee, filmmaker, writer and Chief Creative Officer at Walt Disney Animation Studios
- Gus Salve, Philadelphia Athletics pitcher
- Kim Schifino of Matt & Kim
- Jamie Silva, Indianapolis Colts safety

== Media ==
East Providence High School and its former principal Dr. Caswell were featured on the scripted reality TruTV series The Principal's Office
