= North Smithfield School District =

Public school district

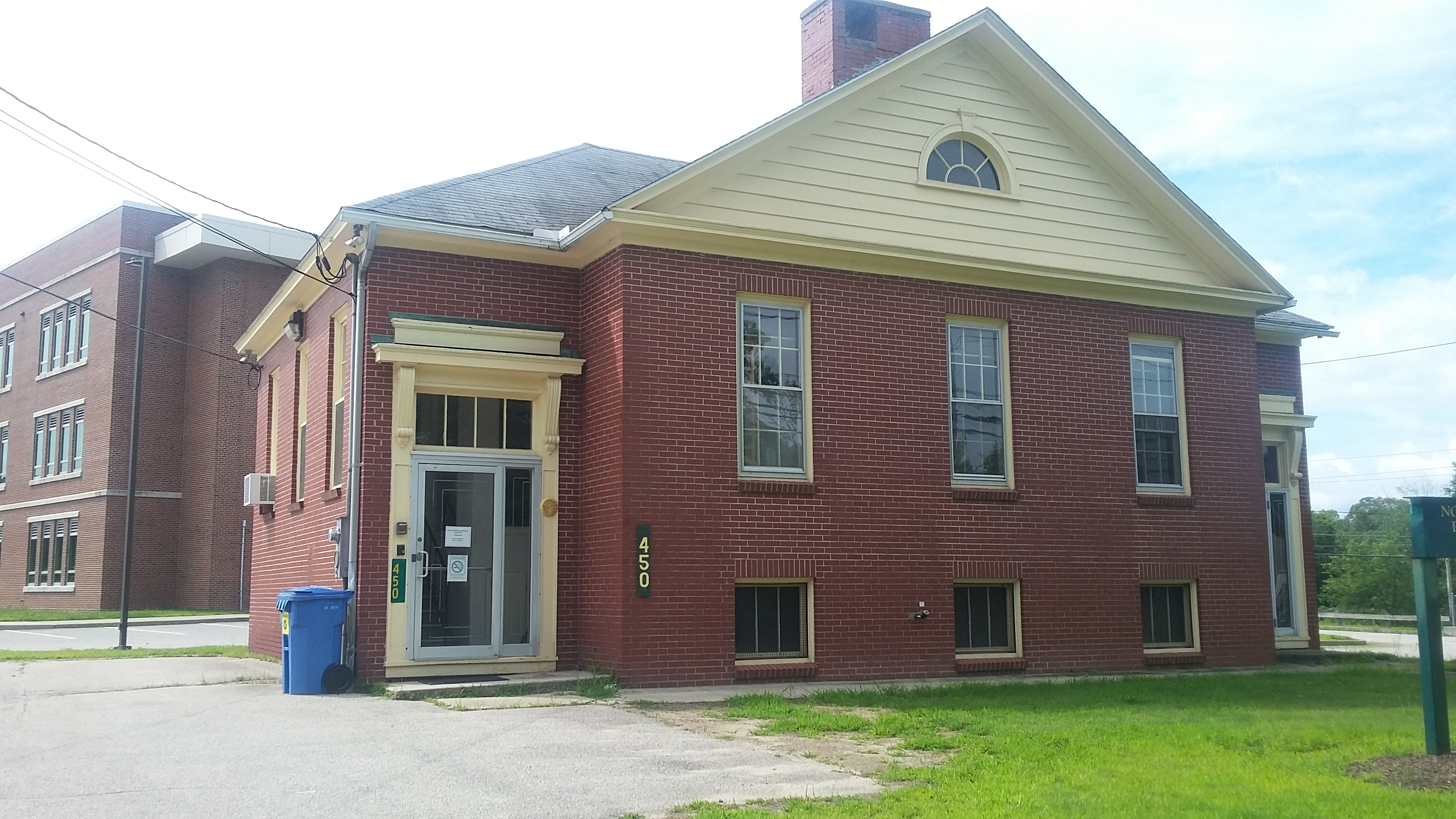
- North Smithfield School Administration building with middle school in the background. The administration building was built on the former site of a wooden school house.

Address
- 1850 Providence Pike North Smithfield, Rhode Island, 02896; United States
- Coordinates: 41.991176°N 71.572679°W

District information
- Type: Public
- Grades: PreK–12
- Established: 1936; 89 years ago
- NCES District ID: 4400810

Students and staff
- Students: 1,666 (2019-2020)
- District mascot: Northmen
- Colors: Green and Gold

Other information
- Website: www.northsmithfieldschools.com

The North Smithfield School District is a school district in the Primrose section of North Smithfield, Rhode Island. It operates two elementary schools, a middle school, and a high school.

== History ==
During the American Revolution, one of North Smithfield's first recorded schools was founded in the home of Elisha Thornton near modern-day Slatersville. In the 1800s many local students attended the private Bushee Academy (Smithfield Union Village Academy) in Union Village. The first school building located near the present school in Primrose, Rhode Island was known as the "Andrews School," originally a one-room wooden school house, first constructed in 1838. The wooden building was replaced by a larger brick building in the early twentieth century, which currently serves as the North Smithfield school superintendent's office, adjacent to the high school and middle school. Prior to the completion of the 1989 school, North Smithfield students attended Kendall Dean School and Dr. Harry L. Halliwell School and temporarily St. Paul Street School in the late 1980s. In 2019 a large new addition to NSES was completed for additional students from the Halliwell School which closed that year.

== Facilities ==
=== Elementary school ===
North Smithfield Elementary School which was built in 1989 (with a large addition built in 2019) and now is used for grades preschool-third grade.

=== Middle school ===
North Smithfield Middle School was built for the 2008–2009 school year which now holds grades six through eight. Prior to its completion, North Smithfield students attended North Smithfield Junior-Senior High School held within the current high school building.

=== High school ===
North Smithfield High School is the only public high school in the town and was ranked fifth out of 51 public high schools in Rhode Island in 2016.

=== Closed ===
The Kendall Dean School was built in 1936, but is no longer used as a school, as is the Dr. Harry L. Halliwell School, which was built in 1957 and closed in 2019.

== Gallery ==
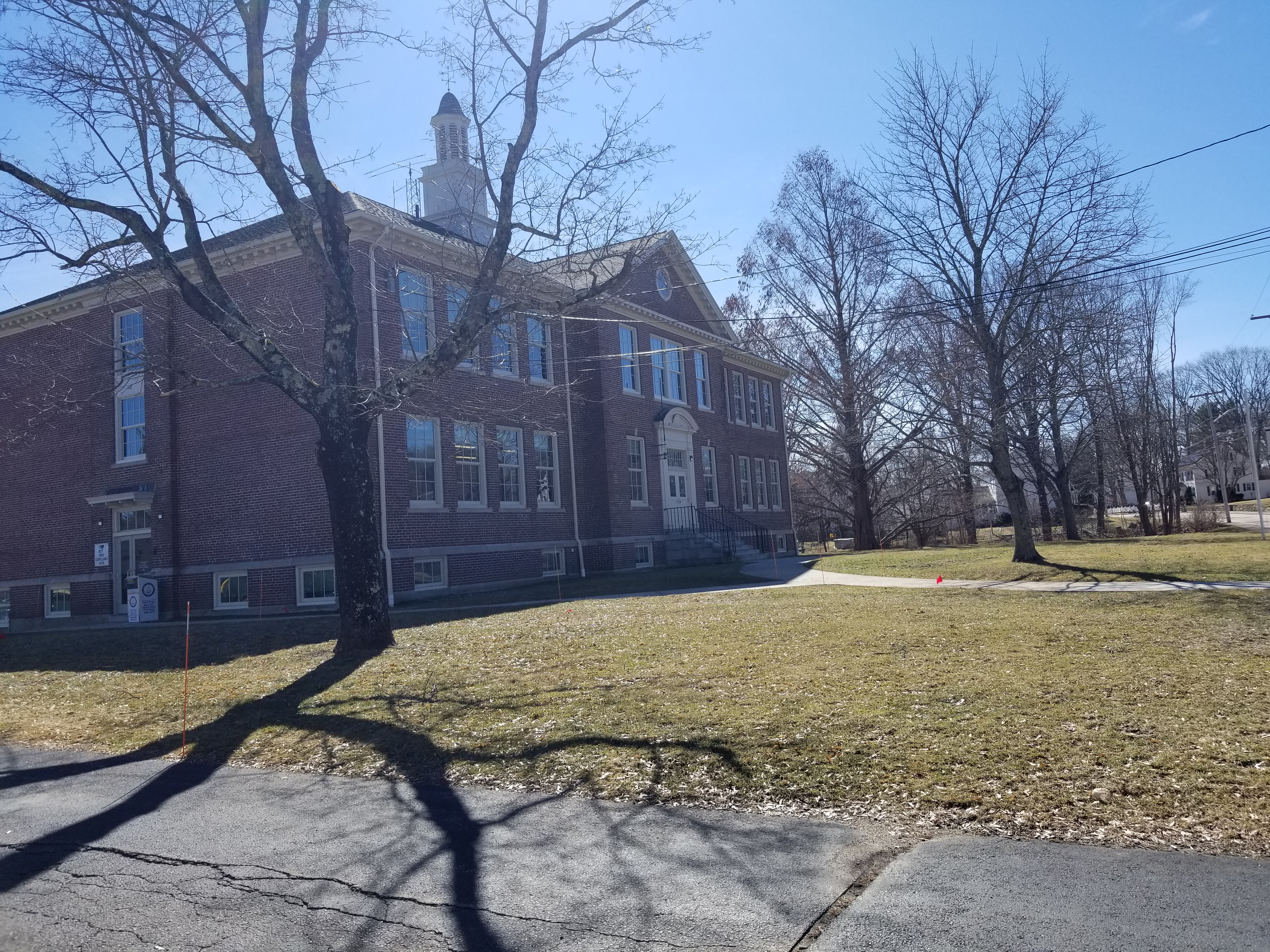
Former Kendall Dean School

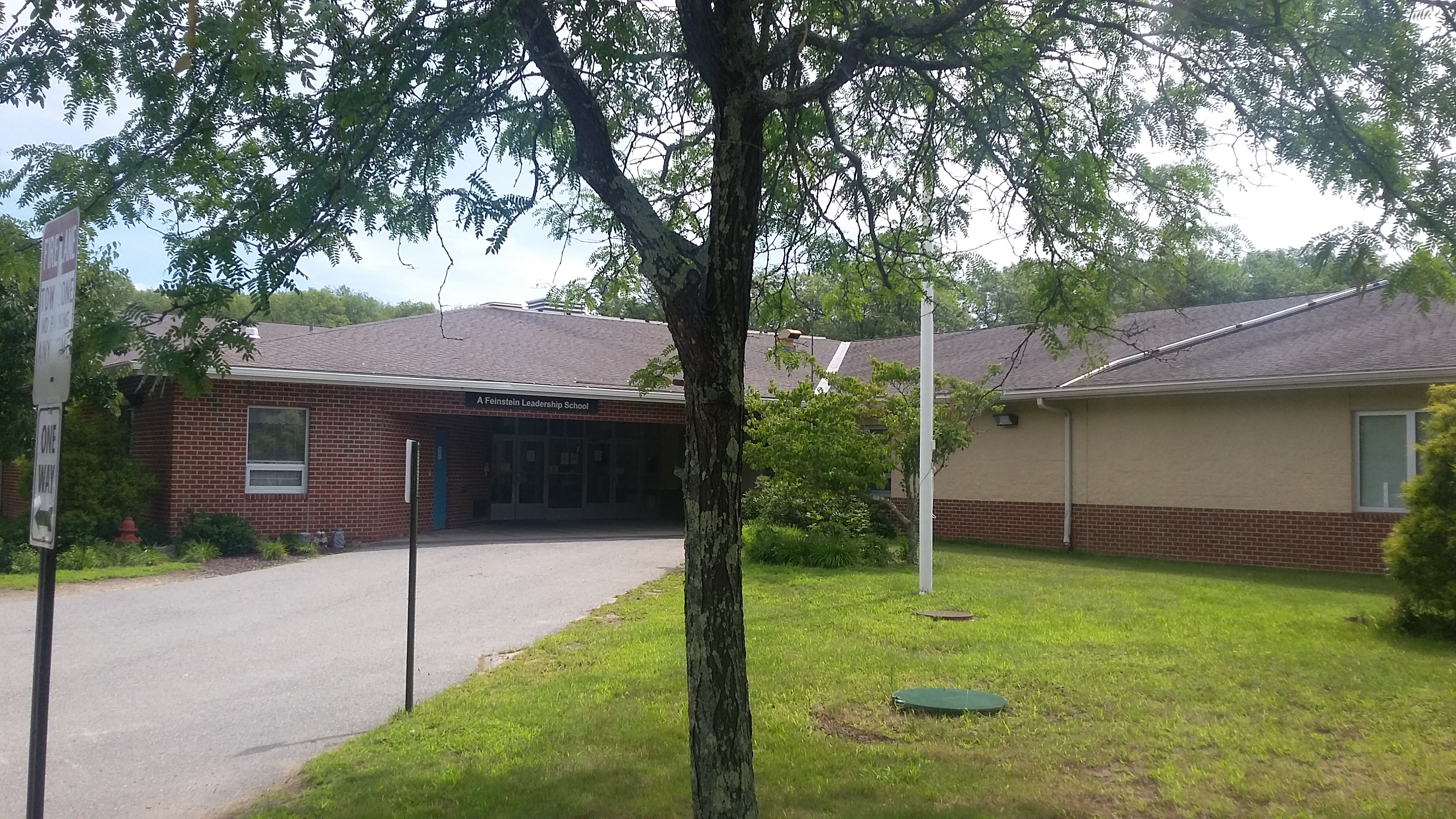
North Smithfield Elementary School

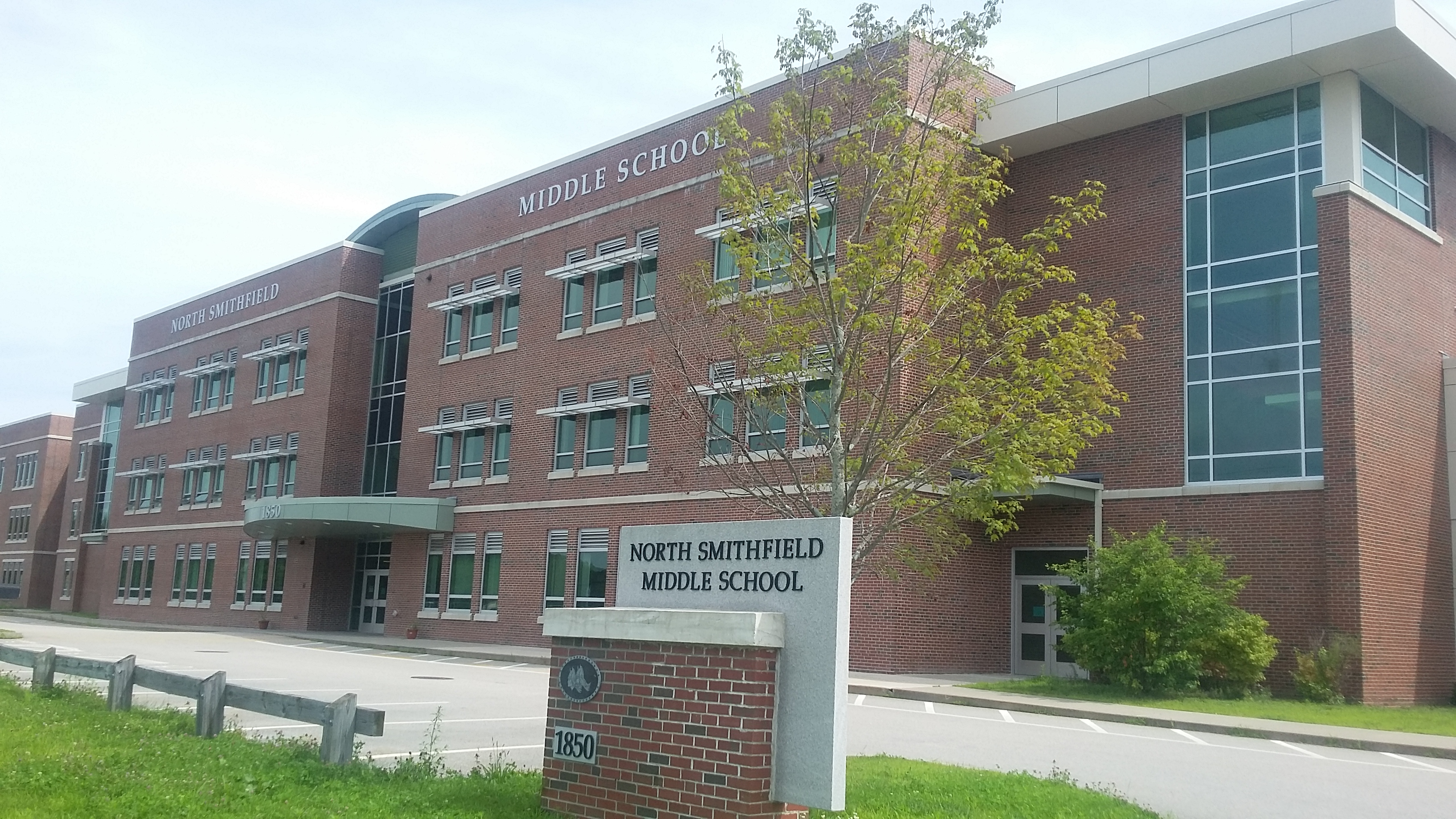
North Smithfield Middle School

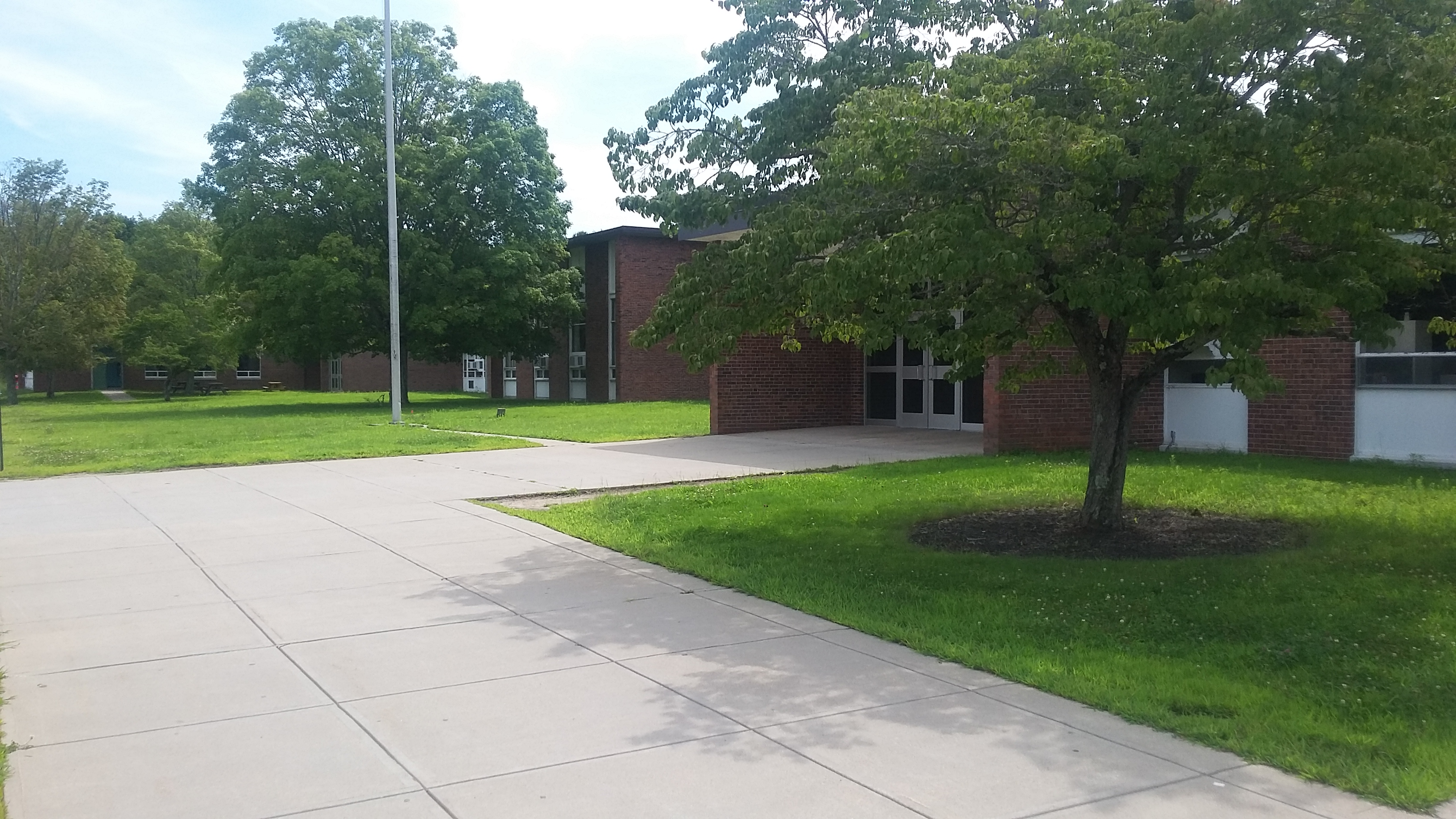
North Smithfield High School

== See also ==
- Schools in Rhode Island
