= St. Rocco School (Johnston, Rhode Island) =

Location
- 931 Atwood Ave. Johnston, Rhode Island 02919; United States; 41.7972°N 71.4834°W

Information
- Type: Parochial school
- Motto: Sharing the Love of the Heart of Christ
- Religious affiliation: Roman Catholic
- Patron saint: St. Rocco
- Established: 1963
- Founder: Fr. James Viero
- School board: Joseph Almagno, Chair Linda Cournoyer, Vice Chair Cindy Soccio, Secretary Joseph Lembo Eric Giorgio Rep. Stephen Ucci Alicia Hanson
- School district: Diocese of Providence
- Superintendent: Daniel J. Ferris
- Principal: Lorraine Moschella
- Employees: 30 (2015)
- Grades: PreK-8
- Enrolment: 243 (2015)
- Campus type: Suburban
- School fees: Parishioners: $5,525 Non-parishioners: $6,025
- Website: http://www.stroccoschool.org

Saint Rocco School is a Roman Catholic parochial elementary and middle school associated with St. Rocco Parish, and located in Johnston, Rhode Island. The school opened in 1963 and was originally operated by the Apostles of the Sacred Heart of Jesus. Today, the school serves 243 students under mostly lay leadership, with a minor presence by the Daughters of Our Lady of the Garden.

== History ==
The pastor of St. Rocco Parish, Fr. James Viero, founded St. Rocco School to serve the growing Italian-Catholic population in Johnston and the surrounding communities. He constructed the new building next to the church. It contained three floors of classrooms, as well as a kitchen, library and event hall. He appealed to the Apostles of the Sacred Heart of Jesus to staff the school, as they were of Italian origin and already were active at the parish teaching religious education. The school opened with 230 students from kindergarten to grade three, with four Sisters and one lay teacher. Sister Ann Marie Signorino, A.S.C.J. became the school's first principal. Because the school started out quite small, the third floor of the new building was rented to the Johnston Public School District, serving as an annex for the public Thornton Elementary School until 1976.

By 1977, the school was "complete" in that it had expanded to contain grades preschool to eight. The next year, St. Rocco's had 572 students and 20 staff, seven religious and thirteen lay.

The 1990s marked the principalship of Sr. Mary Carol Gentile, A.S.C.J. Under her leadership, the school expanded with an addition, and was recognized as a National Blue Ribbon School by the United States Department of Education in 1994.

After the 2005–2006 school year, the Apostles of the Sacred Heart of Jesus departed from St. Rocco School. The next year, the school's first lay principal was installed, Mrs. Magdalen Chianese.

Three Daughters of Our Lady of the Garden, Srs. Mary Antoinette Cappelli, Daisy Kollamparampil and Donna Beauregard arrived at St. Rocco's to teach for the 2014–2015 school year.

As of 2015, St. Rocco School serves 243 students under the stewardship of 30 faculty and staff. The current principal is Mrs. Lorraine Moschella, and the assistant principal is Alfred Monaco. Mrs. Moschella remarked about the condition of the school and her work philosophy at the 2015 May Crowning of Mary ceremony:

“Whenever someone asks for a tour, I always ask them what drew them to come here. And primarily, the reason is ‘word of mouth’ or ‘I knew a family from here. Our reputation has grown through our families. We have been growing as a Catholic school over the past four years, we have both maintained and grown, and we’ve become more diverse over the years with regionalized bussing from different pockets of cities and towns. I want to respect kids, respect the families, respect what people are interested in for a good education, and blend that with a Catholic education, working with the Church, knowing the importance of athletics and extracurricular activities for the kids. I enjoy coming to school every day. It’s not work. It’s coming to school."

The school currently offers athletics including cross country, soccer, basketball and volleyball. Clubs and after school programs offered include dance, art, basketball and martial arts.

== Demographics ==
Year	Total students	Religious teachers	Lay teachers	Total teachers
1963	230	4	1	5
1968	520	n/a	n/a	n/a
1978	572	7	13	20
1978–98	400+	n/a	n/a	n/a
2006–14	200+	0	n/a	n/a
2014	200+	3	n/a	n/a
2015	243	2	28	30
Source: www.stroccoschool.org

== List of principals ==
Principal	Years
Ann Marie Signorino, A.S.C.J.	1963–1970
Unknown Sisters	Sister Domenic Joseph Sister Claudia 1970–1990
Mary Carol Gentile, A.S.C.J.	1990–2003
Unknown Sister(s)	2003–2006
Magdalen Chianese	2006–11
Lorraine Moschella	2011-
Source: www.stroccoschool.org
