= Rhode Island Department of Education =

State agency in Rhode Island

The Rhode Island Department of Education (RIDE) is a state agency in Rhode Island that oversees the elementary and secondary education system from pre-Kindergarten through twelfth grade. It is headquartered in Providence. RIDE works closely with the Rhode Island Office of the Postsecondary Commissioner (RIOPC), the agency charged with overseeing higher education. Together, RIDE and RIOPC aim to provide an aligned, cohesive, and comprehensive education for all students.

The current Commissioner for RIDE is Angélica Infante-Green, a former Deputy Commissioner at the New York State Education Department, who was nominated by Governor Gina M. Raimondo in March 2019. Infante-Green was confirmed by the Rhode Island Council on Elementary and Secondary Education on March 26, 2019.

== Public Education in Rhode Island ==
Rhode Island is home to thirty-two municipal school districts, four regional school districts, four state-operated schools with statewide catchment areas, one regional collaborative, and twenty-five charter schools, for a total of 306 public schools statewide. The day-to-day operations of these schools fall primarily under the purview of Local Education Agencies (LEAs).

State and federal funding, however, is funneled through RIDE as the State Education Agency (SEA). RIDE provides funding to LEAs on a per pupil basis, as determined by the state’s funding formula. As the SEA, RIDE is also responsible for school accountability, as required under federal law, the most recent iteration being the Every Student Succeeds Act (ESSA), which was signed into law by President Barack Obama on December 10, 2015.

== Organization ==
The Rhode Island Department of Education operates under the strategic planning and policy-making guidance of the Rhode Island Council on Elementary and Secondary Education, one of two Councils of the Board. RIDE has the following teams, all under the leadership of the Commissioner:

=== Teaching and Learning ===
- Office of Educator Excellence & Certification Services
- Office of Instruction, Assessment & Curriculum
- Office of Student, Community & Academic Supports

=== Innovation ===
- Office of College & Career Readiness
- Office of Data, Analysis & Research
- Office of Information Services

=== Fiscal Operations ===
- Finance Office
- Office of Statewide Efficiencies

=== Commissioner Support ===
- Office of the Commissioner
- Office of Human Resources
- Legal Office

== Leadership ==
RIDE is currently led by Commissioner of Education Angélica Infante-Green.

=== Past Leadership ===
- Ken Wagner (2015–2019)
- Deborah A. Gist (2009–2015)
- Peter McWalters (1992–2009)

=== Rhode Island Board of Education ===
The Rhode Island Board of Education is made up of two Councils: the Council on Elementary and Secondary Education, and the Council on Postsecondary Education. Each Council has its own chair, with a shared Board of Education Chair, Barbara Cottam.

A 17-member Rhode Island Board of Education was created by the Rhode Island General Assembly in 2014, replacing the Board of Regents for Elementary and Secondary Education and the Board of Governors for Higher Education. This consolidated governance of all public education in Rhode Island aims to provide aligned policy making and planning for elementary, secondary, and higher public education. Each Council has its own series of regular public meetings and work sessions, with a shared Board of Education meeting scheduled quarterly.

Rhode Island Board of Education Barbara Cottam, Chairwoman
Council on Elementary and Secondary Education	Council on Postsecondary Education
Amy Beretta, Esq.	Timothy DelGuidice, Chair
Colleen Callahan, Ed.D.	Dennis Duffy, Esq.
Karen Davis	Rachelle Green, Esq.
Gara Brooke Field, Ph.D.	The Honorable Thomas Izzo
Jo Eva Gaines	Marianne F. Monte
Daniel McConaghy, Chair	Reverend Jeffrey Williams
Marta V. Martínez	
Lawrence Purtill	

== Learning Standards ==
Rhode Island schools follow the Common Core State Standards, which define the knowledge and skills students should have within their K–12 education careers so that they will graduate from high school able to succeed in entry-level, credit-bearing academic college courses and in workforce training programs.

== Assessments and Accountability ==
=== State Assessments ===
As of the 2017–2018 school year, all Rhode Island students in grades 3 through 8 are expected to participate in the Rhode Island Comprehensive Assessment System (RICAS) assessments in English Language Arts (ELA) and mathematics. The RICAS is administered each spring, with districts and schools determining their own testing windows. Total testing time varies by grade, ranging from 130 minutes for Grade 3 Mathematics to 210 minutes for Grade 8 ELA. Students complete sessions over several days or weeks.

High school students are expected to participate in the College Board assessments in Evidence-Based Reading and Writing and Mathematics in grade 10, using the PSAT, and in grade 11, using the SAT.

=== Data Collection ===
To support student achievement, hold schools accountable, and ensure transparency, RIDE makes education data publicly available through its website. Data reports are available in several different formats, including information on assessment results, graduation rates, enrollment, attendance, and transparent financial information about districts through a Uniform Chart of Accounts (UCOA) system.

Each year, RIDE also conducts a statewide school culture and climate survey called SurveyWorks. This initiative surveys students, educators, and families, about school culture indicators such as family engagement, school leadership, and school safety.

As Rhode Island transitions to its ESSA State Plan, performance data will continue to be made publicly available and accessible through ESSA Report Cards.

=== Accountability ===
School accountability data provides the public with information about whether schools and districts are meeting goals and making progress. RIDE calculates an accountability index for every school, known as a Composite Index Score (CIS), and that score is utilized to make school classifications.

Composite Index Scores are calculated using three metrics or measures of performance based on school level: percent meets expectations (also called proficiency) for English Language Arts (ELA) and mathematics; performance gaps, or gap closure, for ELA and mathematics; and either student growth for ELA and mathematics at the elementary and middle level only; or high school graduation rate at the high school level only.

Based on CIS scores, schools are classified as:

- Commended Schools have the highest index scores in the state and no achievement gaps; they are recognized because of either high performance or significant progress.
- Focus Schools have the lowest point totals in the state (excluding Priority Schools) for proficiency or gap-closing, regardless of their index score.
- Priority Schools have the lowest Composite Index Scores in the state. Schools previously identified as Persistently Lowest Achievement are also Priority Schools.

The overall accountability system enables RIDE to focus on learning gaps; document and learn from schools that are making progress; provide information that raises questions for further investigation; and identify schools that need additional support and attention.

== Diploma System ==
=== Secondary Regulations ===
Rhode Island's Secondary Regulations, last revised in 2016 by the Council on Elementary and Secondary Education, set the framework for implementing the Rhode Island Diploma System. These regulations require all school districts to develop and implement a comprehensive secondary diploma system for middle and high schools that includes: student and teacher supports, local-aligned policies, multiple learning opportunities for all students, and multiple measures for determining graduation readiness.

=== Graduation Requirements ===
The Rhode Island Council on Elementary and Secondary Education, through the Secondary School Regulations, set the minimum requirements for earning a Rhode Island high school diploma, including:

- Demonstrated proficiency in six core areas (English Language Arts, mathematics, science, social studies, the arts, and technology)
- Successful completion of 20 courses (at a minimum)
- Completion of two performance assessments (exhibitions, portfolios, and/or comprehensive course assessments)

Districts may include additional expectations or requirements such as additional coursework requirements or community service learning.

=== Council Designations ===
As outlined in the Secondary School Regulations, Council Designations serve as a means to personalize the traditional high school diploma. Each Council Designation externally validates achievements of high school students, through flexible and personalized high school learning experiences, to allow public recognition of specific skills, and to incentivize students to meet additional high standards beyond those needed to earn a high school diploma.

The following three Council Designations have been adopted by the Council on Elementary and Secondary Education and are currently available to students, beginning with the graduating class of 2021:

- Commissioner's Seal certifies that a student is proficient in standards aligned to high school expectations in English Language Arts and mathematics, as confirmed by external evidence.
- Seal of Biliteracy certifies that a student has demonstrated skill in the use of the English language and one or more other world languages.
- Pathway Endorsement certifies that a student has accomplished deep learning in a chosen area of interest and is prepared for employment or further education in a career path.

=== Pathway Endorsements ===
Pathways provide students the opportunity to self-direct a customized learning experience, capitalizing on school and community opportunities toward personal interest, post-secondary education, and careers. RIDE believes that Pathway Endorsements add value to the diploma system by signaling to employers, colleges, universities, training programs, and the military that a student has completed a comprehensive, in-depth, and applied course of study in a specialized area.

Students can earn a Pathway Endorsement through participation in a cohort-based pathway program or an individualized pathway.

Beginning with the Class of 2021, students may earn a Pathway Endorsement in one or more of the following:

- The arts
- Business and industry
- Humanities and world languages
- Public service
- STEM
- Teaching

== Educator Certification ==
The Rhode Island Department of Education certifies all public school teachers, administrators and support professionals in line with the State's certification regulations. There are four pathways for educators to become certified:

- The RI Approved Program Pathway allows individuals to become certified after completion of an in-state educator preparation program.
- The Credential Review Pathway allows eligible individuals to pursue RI certification in a limited number of certificate areas by following a differentiated program of study (determined by a consortium institution or RIDE).
- The Reciprocity Pathway allows individuals who completed a state approved out-of-state preparation program or who hold valid full out-of-state certificates to pursue a similar RI certification.
- The Preliminary Certificate Pathway allow individuals to seek and secure employment while pursuing the requirements for full RI certification.
