= Central High School (Providence, Rhode Island) =

Coordinates: 41.816590°N 71.421078°W

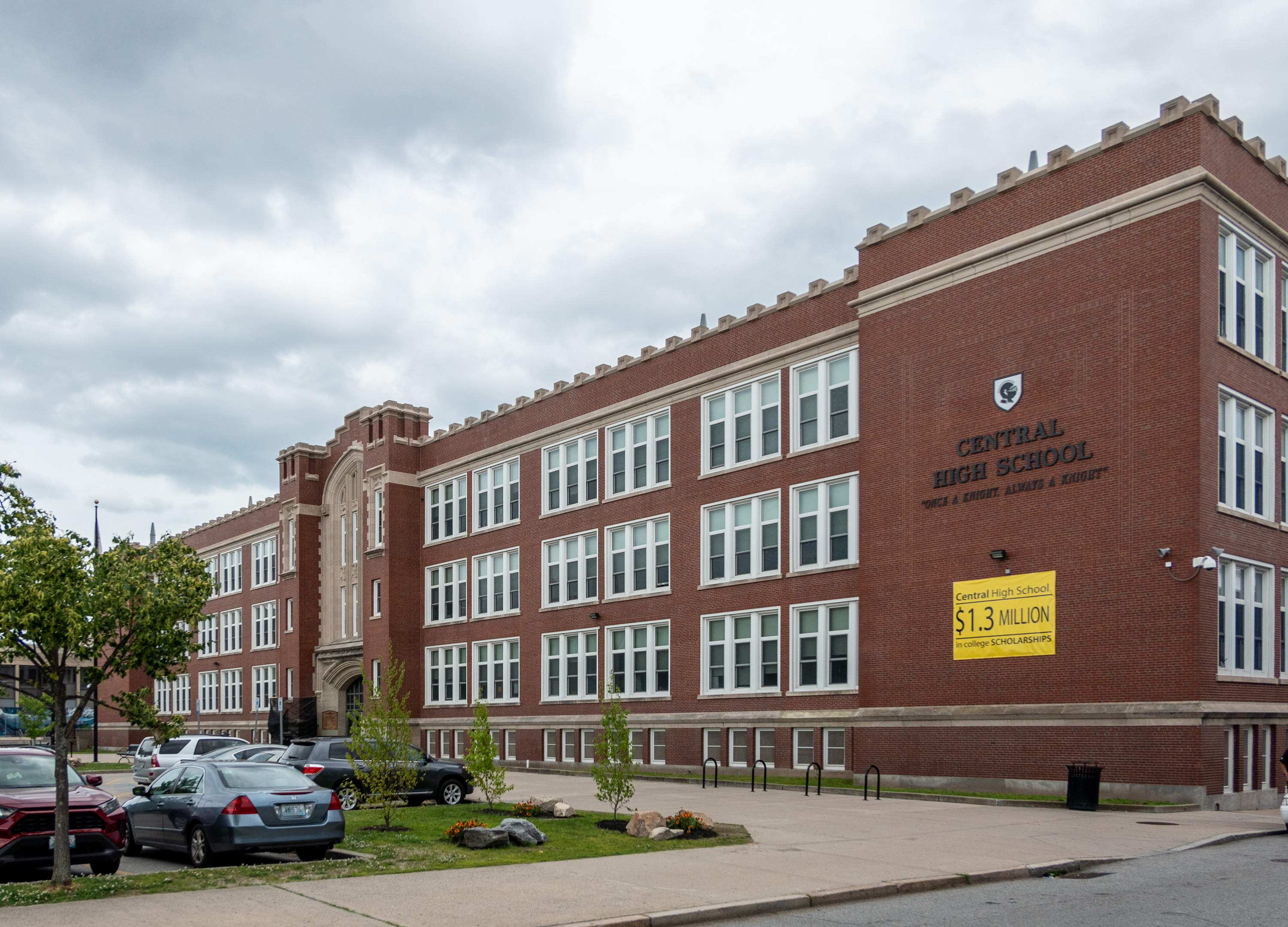

Location
- 70 Fricker Street; Providence, Rhode Island 02903; United States

Information
- Type: Public Secondary
- Established: 1921
- Principal: Scott R. Sutherland
- Teaching staff: 63.00 (FTE)
- Grades: 9–12
- Enrollment: 1,119 (2023-2024)
- Student to teacher ratio: 17.76
- Campus: Urban
- Colors: Black and gold
- Mascot: Knight
- Website: Central High School

Central High School is a public high school in the Providence Public School District, Rhode Island, United States.

Central High School stands roughly at the intersection of the Federal Hill, West End, and Upper South Providence neighborhoods.

In November 2022 Principal Robert DiMuccio was stabbed by a student. He suffered minor injuries.

== Notable alumni ==
- Marvin Barnes, professional basketball player
- Frank Caprio, judge
- Ed Cooley, Georgetown University basketball coach
- Phil Price, Canadian football player
- George Lincoln Rockwell, founder of the American Nazi Party
