= Central Falls School District =

Rhode Island school district

Coordinates: 41.89057°N 71.39217°W

Central Falls School District is a school district headquartered in Central Falls, Rhode Island, United States. It serves the City of Central Falls.

== History ==
The school district fired all teachers at Central Falls High School when they declined to spend 25 minutes more per day as part of remediating deficiencies under the No Child Left Behind Act. The school had been identified as one of the worst in the state. The teachers union sued the school district challenging the requirement that teachers must reapply for their jobs.

In accordance with NCLB legislation, schools deemed failing have four options to follow for restructuring. The teachers' union refused to accept to work 25 minutes of extra time under the "transforming model", so the superintendent went ahead and chose the "turnaround model", which requires a district to fire the entire staff (teachers and administrators). They may rehire up to 50% of the teachers for the beginning of the next school year. The school has a graduation rate of around 50%, and 7% of 11th-graders were proficient in math in 2009. The Obama administration supported the school board's position. In May 2010, the teachers were rehired when they agreed to work the extra time required.

== Schools ==
=== Secondary schools ===
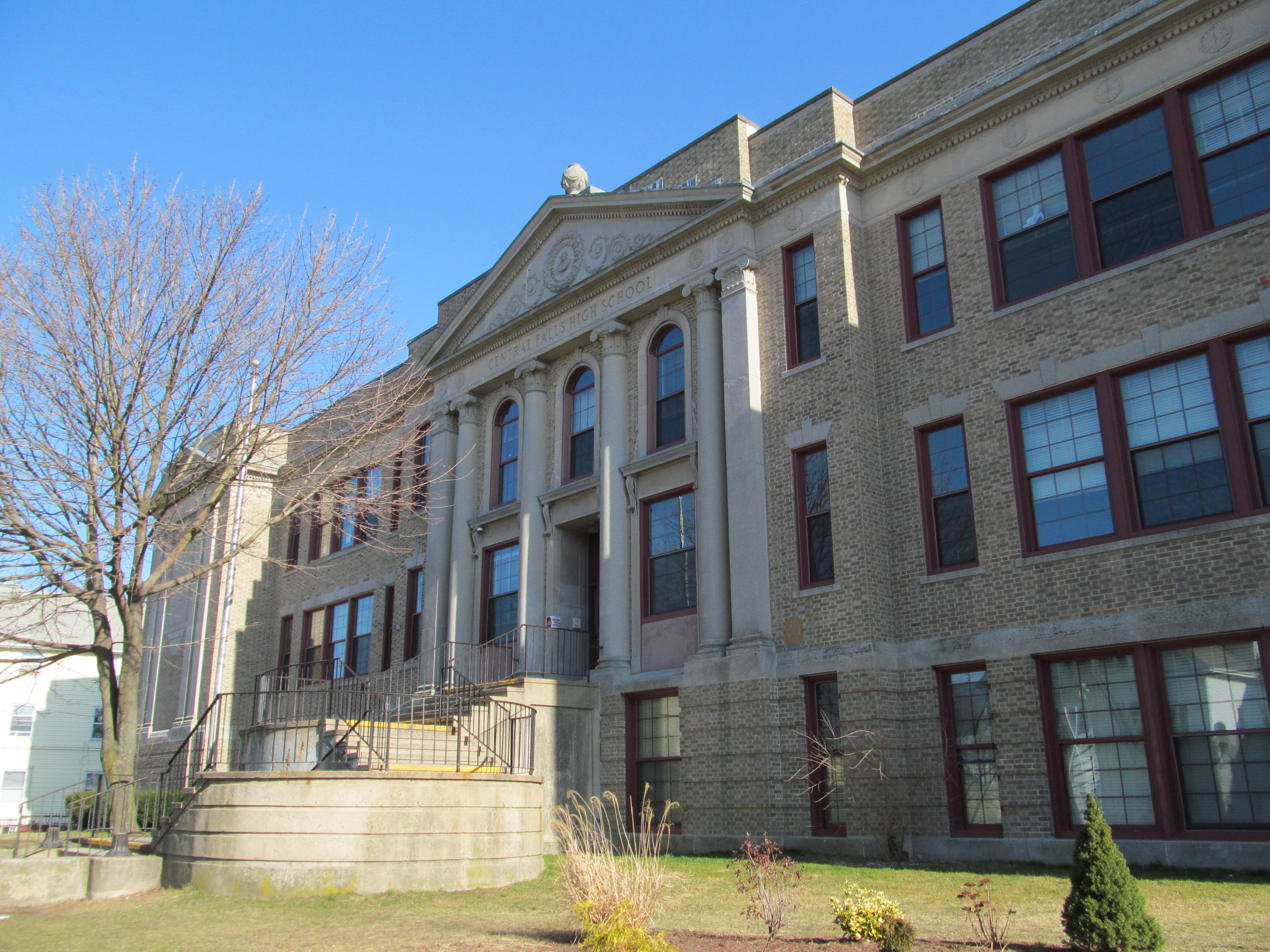
Central Falls High School

- Central Falls High School
- Calcutt Middle School

=== Primary schools ===
Elementary school

- Alan Shawn Feinstein Elementary School
- Ella Risk Elementary School
- Raices Dual Language Academy
- Veterans Memorial Elementary School

PreK-kindergarten

- Captain G. Harold Hunt School
