= Marta V. Martínez =

American activist and historian

Marta V. Martínez is a community program administrator, activist and historian in Providence, Rhode Island.

Martínez grew up in El Paso, Texas. Martínez graduated from Providence College in 1979 and from George Washington University with a master's degree in journalism in 1985.

Much of Martínez's work has centered around advocacy for, and documenting the history of, the Latinx community in Rhode Island. She was the first director of the Hispanic Social Services Association (HSSA) which, during her tenure, became the Center for Hispanic Policy and Advocacy CHisPA), one of two non-profit organizations in Rhode Island in the 1980s and 1990s. In 1988, Marta V. Martínez founded the Hispanic Heritage Committee. The committee developed into the non-profit organization, Rhode Island Latino Arts. Martínez remains with the organization to date, acting as chair until 2013 and becoming executive director thereafter.

Martínez established Nuestras Raíces: The Latino Oral History Project of Rhode Island in 1991 and Martínez's book, Latino History in Rhode Island (ISBN 9781540223531), in part a compilation of oral histories, was published in 2014.

Martínez has twice been named "Person to Watch" by the Providence Journal. She was also named artist-in-residence at Trinity Repertory Company in 2018, and she received an honorary degree from Providence College in 2019.
