= East Providence School District =

Rhode Island school district

Address
- 145 Taunton Avenue East Providence, Rhode Island, 2914; United States

District information
- Type: Public
- Grades: PreK–12
- NCES District ID: 4400330

Students and staff
- Students: 5,041
- Teachers: 395.23
- Staff: 286.1
- Student–teacher ratio: 12.75

East Providence School District is the school district of East Providence, Rhode Island.

== History ==
Kathryn Crowley became the superintendent in 2015.

== Schools ==
High

- East Providence High School
- East Providence Career and Technical Center

Middle

- Edward R. Martin Middle School
- Riverside Middle School

Elementary

- Francis School
- Hennessy School
- Kent Heights School
- Orlo Avenue School
- Silver Spring School
- Waddington School
- Whiteknact School

Pre-Kindergarten and Kindergarten

- James R. D. Oldham School
- Pre-Kindergarten Program
