= Hope High School (Rhode Island) =

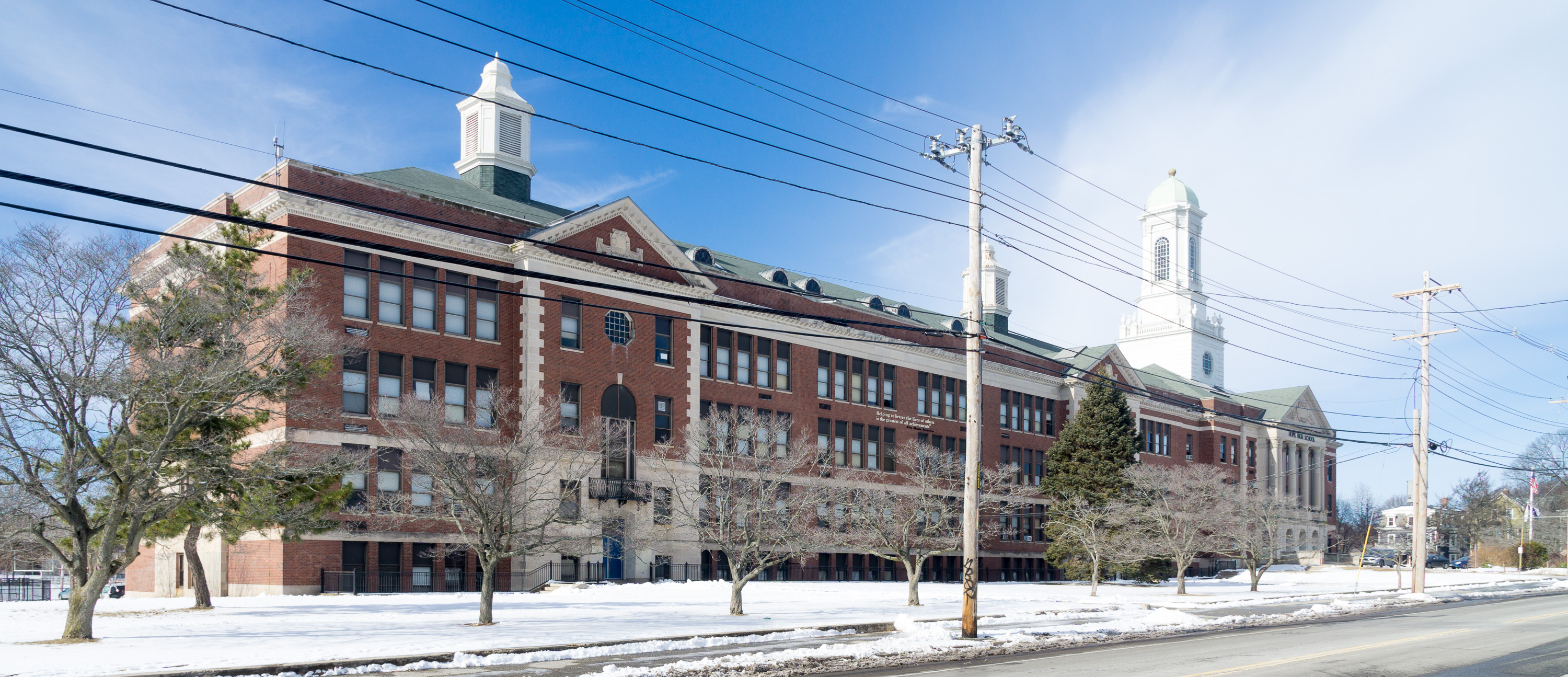

Location
- 324 Hope Street; Providence, Rhode Island 02906; United States
- 41.83479°N 71.40206°W

Information
- Type: Public high school
- Established: 1898
- School district: Providence Public School District
- NCES District ID: 4400900
- NCES School ID: 440090000224
- Principal: Francisco Velasquez
- Teaching staff: 62.00 (FTE)
- Grades: 9–12 (Vocational School 8-12)
- Enrollment: 775 (2024-2025)
- Student to teacher ratio: 13.21
- Campus: Urban
- Color: Blue
- Mascot: Blue Wave
- Website: Official website

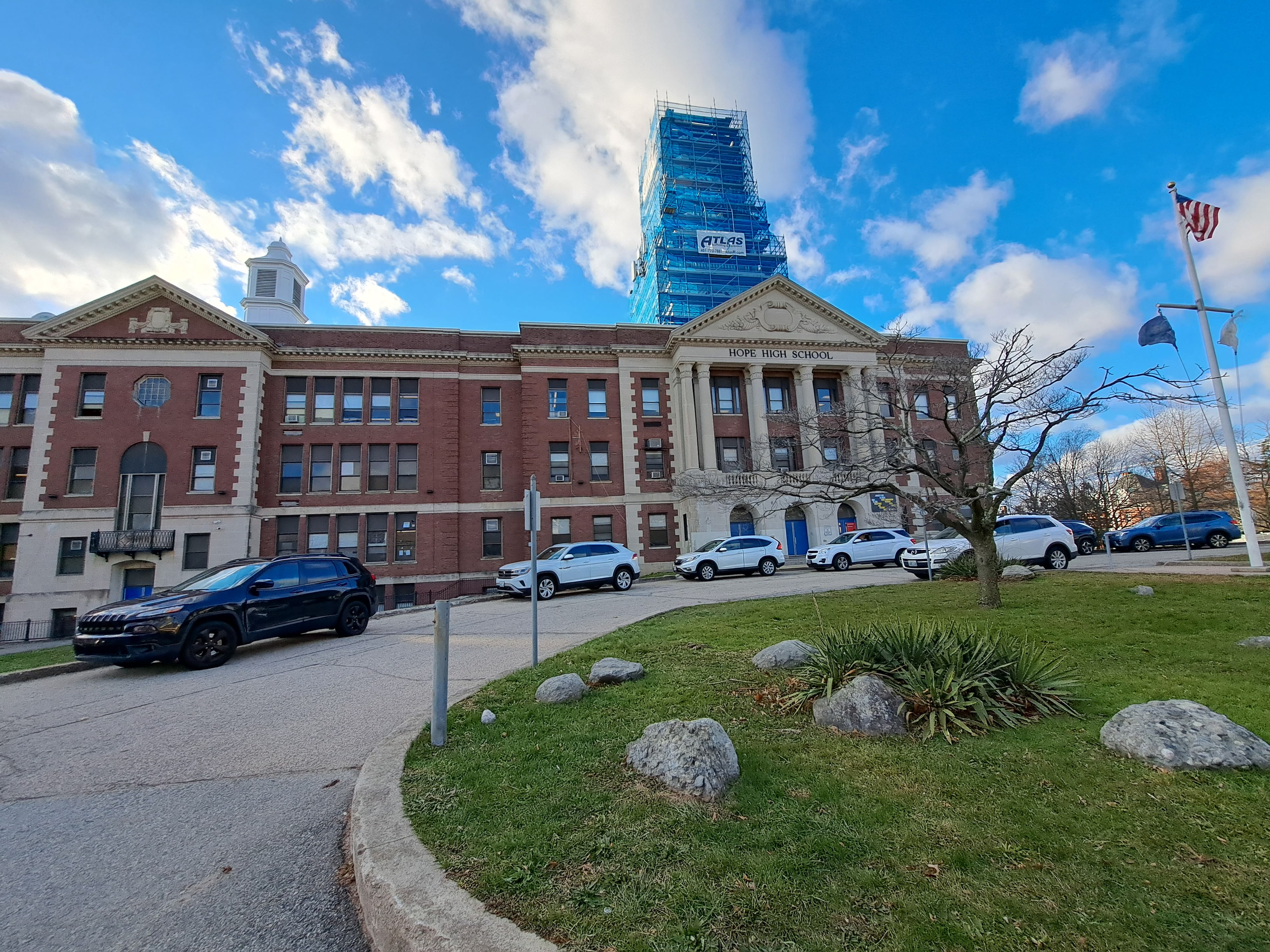

Hope High School is a public high school in the East Side of Providence, Rhode Island, U.S. operated by Providence Public School District. It was founded in 1898. Its current building was completed in June 1936.

== Community system ==
In 2003, Hope High School was partitioned into three semi-independent "communities": Hope High School Arts Community, Hope High School Technology Community, and Hope Leadership Community—each with its own principal. Since June 2009, the Leadership Community no longer exists and as of June 2012, the Arts and Technology communities were merged into one school.

The triune system was developed in an attempt to remedy a history of exceptionally low test scores (2008 SAT combined score was 1047, over 900 points lower than Moses Brown School, a private school 2 blocks away) at Hope High School. Many regard Hope High - and the future success or failure of these reforms - as a "litmus test" for educational reform in Rhode Island.

It serves grades 9-12 with a total of 949 students as of the 2020 academic year.

== Student demographics ==
For the 2020–21 academic year, Hope High School (Rhode Island) enrolled 949 students, according to the National Center for Education Statistics. The school employed 75.20 full-time equivalent educators, resulting in a student to teacher ratio of 12.6:1.

Enrollment by race and ethnicity (2020–21)
Race and ethnicity^{†}	Enrolled pupils	Percentage
African American	160	16.86%
Asian	34	3.58%
Hispanic	647	68.18%
Native American	14	1.48%
White	53	5.58%
Native Hawaiian, Pacific islander	1	0.11%
Multi-race	40	4.21%
Total	949	100%
^{†} "Hispanic" includes Hispanics of any race. All other categories refer to non-Hispanics.

Enrollment by gender (2020–21)
Gender	Enrolled pupils	Percentage
Female	388	40.89%
Male	561	59.11%
Non-binary	0	0%
Total	949	100%

Enrollment by grade (2020–21)
Grade	Enrolled pupils	Percentage
9	280	29.5%
10	242	25.5%
11	213	22.44%
12	214	22.55%
Ungraded	0	0%
Total	949	100%

== Athletic history ==
Hope High School won four baseball championships and three football championships between 1918 and 1929. Hope won the 1917, 1928, 1930, 1990, and 1992 state interscholastic outdoor track meet championships. The cross country team was the division two state champions 1988-1992. Hope's soccer team won the Rhode Island division 1 championship in 2006.

In 1938 Hope High's basketball team not only won the RI Schoolboy State Championship, the boys from Hope Street went on to win the New England Basketball Championship hosted in Connecticut. Charles Melay Simon earned all New England Honors to go along with his RI Schoolboy All State Honors.

In the period 1960 through 1963, Hope High's Falkmen (coach Bill Falk) were undefeated in cross-country, indoor and outdoor track competition winning both Division1 and State Championships all 4 years. In the winter of 1961, Hope High teams were Division 1 and State Champions in Basketball, Hockey, and Indoor Track - the three major winter sports at the time.

The 1956, 1960, and 1961 Hope hockey teams, coached by Ed Mullen, were crowned R.I. State champions.

== Notable people ==
=== Alumni ===
- Richard S. Aldrich, U.S. Representative
- Leah B. Allen, astronomer, professor, and observatory director
- Deon Anderson, former NFL player. Spent only one season in the school
- Edward Beard, U.S. Representative
- Aaron Beck, psychiatrist and inventor of cognitive behavioral therapy.
- Betty Wells Halladay, illustrator of the Grant-Hadley Enterprises publication Rhode Island on Lovecraft (1945).
- H. P. Lovecraft, horror author
- Simon Ostrach, noted engineer in developing the NASA program in microgravity science
- Ben Powers, actor Good Times and Mike Hammer
- Al Russas, former NFL player

=== Faculty ===
- Frank Caprio, former teacher
- Juanita Sánchez, founder of The Rainbow Center for teen parents
