= G. Wayne Miller =

American novelist (born 1954)

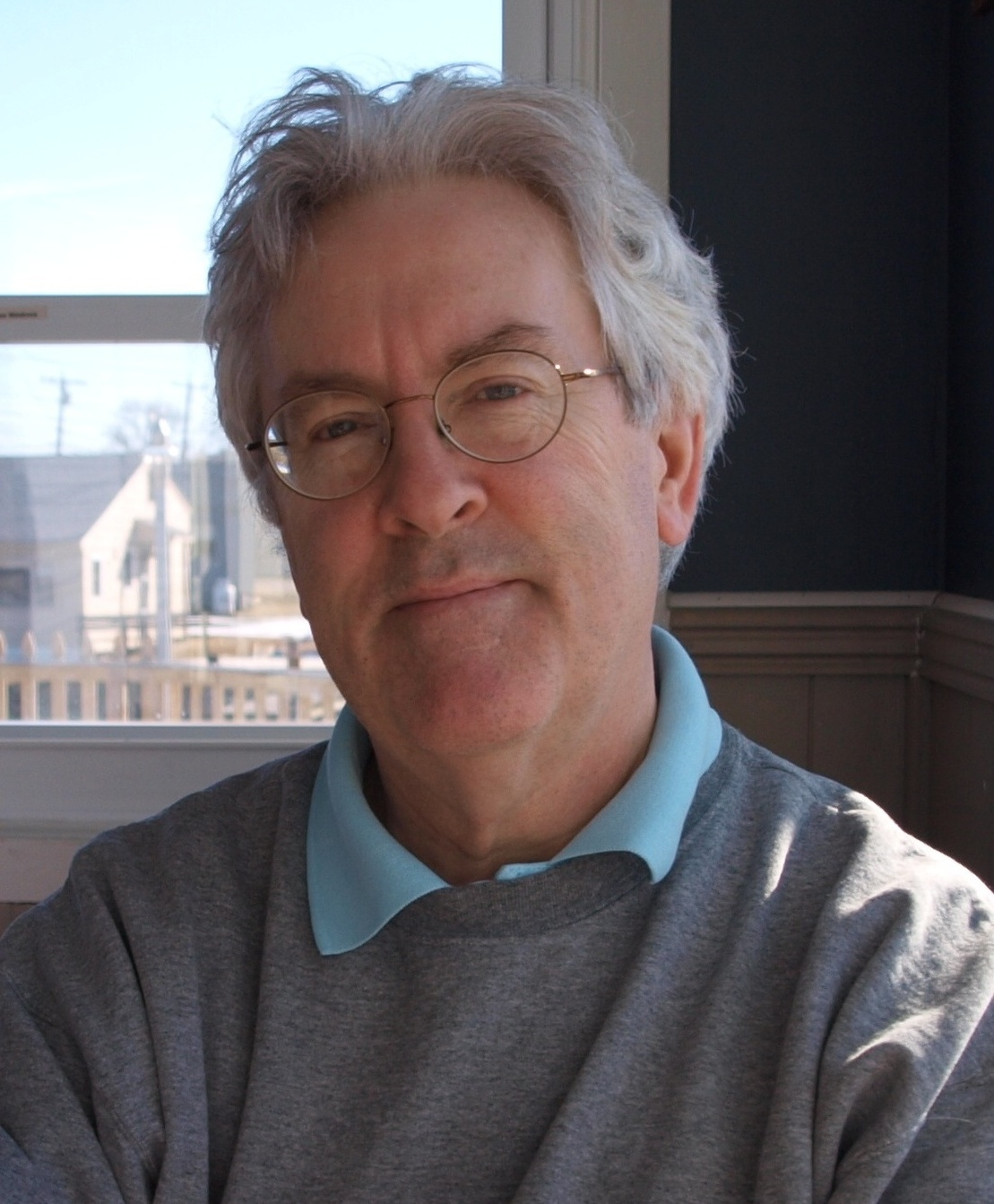
G. Wayne Miller

G. Wayne Miller (born June 12, 1954) is an American author, journalist and filmmaker. He is a faculty member at Salve Regina University's Pell Center for International Relations and Public Policy, in Newport, Rhode Island, where he is co-founder and director of the Story in the Public Square program and co-producer of the national PBS/SiriusXM Radio show by the same name.

== Early life ==
Miller is the last child and only son of the late Roger L. Miller, an airplane mechanic, and Mary M. Miller, a homemaker. He was raised in Wakefield, Massachusetts, where he attended Saint Joseph School. He graduated in 1972 from St. John's Preparatory School in Danvers, Massachusetts, where he was co-editor of his high school newspaper and also co-wrote and published an underground newspaper. Miller graduated cum laude from Harvard College in 1976.

== Career ==
In 1978, Miller became a reporter at The Transcript, a small daily newspaper in North Adams, Massachusetts, now part of The Berkshire Eagle. In 1979, he took a staff writer position at the larger Cape Cod Times in Hyannis, Massachusetts. From 1981 to 2022, he was a staff writer at The Providence Journal. In 1988, he sold his first book, a novel, Thunder Rise (hardcover, 1989; paperback, 1992), first in a trilogy of horror novels, to William Morrow.

Miller's first book of non-fiction, The Work of Human Hands: Hardy Hendren and Surgical Wonder at Children's Hospital, was first published in 1993. It was edited by Jon Karp, then an editor at Random House, and now president and publisher of Simon & Schuster Publishing Group.

Toy Wars: The Epic Struggle Between G.I. Joe, Barbie and the Companies That Make Them, released in 1998, opened readers to the previously closed doors exposing the inner workings of toy manufacturing giants and Fortune 500 companies Mattel and Hasbro. In 2000, Miller published King of Hearts: The True Story of the Maverick Who Pioneered Open Heart Surgery, an account of the men who created open-heart surgery focusing on Dr. C. Walton Lillehei. The popularity and success of Toy Wars would later lead to the opportunity to write Men and Speed: A Wild Ride Through NASCAR's Breakout Season, in 2002, the result of Miller being granted unprecedented access to Roush Racing (now Roush Fenway Racing) during the 2001 season.

Miller's next book was The Xeno Chronicles: Two Years on the Frontier of Medicine Inside Harvard's Transplant Research Lab. His eighth book, An Uncommon Man: The Life and Times of Senator Claiborne Pell, about the six-term Rhode Island senator best remembered for creating the Pell Grants educational loan program, was published in October 2011. In November 2013, Simon & Schuster published Top Brain, Bottom Brain: Surprising Insights Into How You Think, which Miller coauthored with neuroscientist and psychologist Stephen M. Kosslyn. A revised edition, Top Brain, Bottom Brain: Harnessing the Power of the Four Cognitive Modes, was published in March 2015.

In 2004 Miller was part of a team that was a finalist for the Pulitzer Prize for Public Service for their four-part series Fatal Foam, a look at the flammability dangers of household furniture and beds. It was part of the Providence Journal's coverage of the devastating Rhode Island nightclub fire that killed 100 people in 2003. Among his other awards is the 2013 Roger Williams Independent Voice Award, presented by the Rhode Island International Film Festival, "to an outstanding artist whose vision promotes tolerance, compassion and understanding. It is named after the founder of Rhode Island, Roger Williams, who established an American tradition of religious freedom and individual liberty that was encoded in The Bill of Rights". He has also received the "Bell of Hope - Mental Health Hero" award from the Mental Health Association of Rhode Island for his coverage of mental-health issues.

Miller has also written the Thunder Rise trilogy of horror novels, Thunder Rise, Asylum, and Summer Place; a fourth horror novel, Drowned: A Different Kind of Zombie Tale; and three collections of horror, mystery and science-fiction short stories.

Miller co-produced and wrote the documentary On the Lake: Life and Love in a Distant Place, released in 2009 and subsequently broadcast on PBS. He also wrote and co-produced Behind the Hedgerow : Eileen Slocum and the Meaning of Newport Society, which premiered in 2010. In 2011, Miller wrote and co-produced The Providence Journal's Coming Home, about veterans of the wars in Iraq, which won a regional Edward R. Murrow Award and was nominated for a New England Emmy. The documentary was based on Miller's 16th newspaper series, The War on Terror: Coming Home, which the Providence Journal published in the fall of 2011.

In 2012, Miller became a visiting fellow at Salve Regina University's Pell Center for International Relations and Public Policy in Newport, Rhode Island. He is co-founder and director of the center's Story in the Public Square program. Since September 2018, Story in the Public Square, the multiple Telly Award-winning public television and SiriusXM Satellite Radio weekly program, has been broadcast nationally and is now seen in 87 percent of all U.S. markets with 516 weekly airings. Miller co-hosts and co-produces the show with Pell Center executive director Jim Ludes. The show was the inaugural winner of the Newport Historical Society's History Starts Here Award.

Kid Number One: A story of heart, soul and business, featuring Alan Hassenfeld and Hasbro, was published in September 2019 by Stillwater River Publications, and Blue Hill was published in October 2020 by Crossroad Press. Miller's latest book, Traces of Mary, was published in 2022 by Macabre Ink.

In November 2022, Miller left the Providence Journal after four decades as a staff writer to become director of Ocean State Stories, a new media outlet from Salve Regina University's Pell Center serving all of Rhode Island and the many diverse communities that comprise the state.

Miller's 21st book, Unfit to Print: A Modern Media Satire, was published in October 2023.

Miller's 22nd book, Burnt Cove, was published in April 2026.

== Personal life ==
Miller is married to Y. T. Gabrielle and is the father of three children. He lives near Providence, Rhode Island, and enjoys time on the New England coast.

== Bibliography ==
- Thunder Rise: Book One of the Thunder Rise Trilogy (1989)
- The Work of Human Hands: Hardy Hendren and Surgical Wonder at Children's Hospital (1993)
- Coming of Age: The True Adventures of Two American Teens (1995)
- Toy Wars: The Epic Struggle Between G.I. Joe, Barbie and the Companies That Make Them (1998)
- King of Hearts: The True Story of the Maverick Who Pioneered Open Heart Surgery (2000)
- Men and Speed: A Wild Ride Through NASCAR's Breakout Season (2002)
- The Xeno Chronicles: Two Years on the Frontier of Medicine Inside Harvard's Transplant Research Lab (2005)
- An Uncommon Man: The Life and Times of Senator Claiborne Pell (2011)
- Since the Sky Blew Off: The Essential G. Wayne Miller Fiction, Vol. 1 (2012)
- Asylum: Book Two of the Thunder Rise Trilogy (2013)
- Summer Place: Book Three of the Thunder Rise Trilogy (2013)
- Vapors: The Essential G. Wayne Miller Fiction, Vol. 2 (2013)
- Top Brain, Bottom Brain: Surprising Insights Into How You Think (with Stephen M. Kosslyn, 2013)
- The Beach That Summer: The Essential G. Wayne Miller Fiction, Vol. 3 (2014)
- Drowned: A Different Kind of Zombie Tale (2015)
- Car Crazy: The War for Supremacy Between Ford and Olds and the Dawn of the Automobile Age (2015)
- Kid Number One: A Story of Heart, Soul and Business, featuring Alan Hassenfeld and Hasbro (2019)
- Blue Hill (2020)
- The Growing Season: Frank Beazley and the Meaning of Life (2020)
- Traces of Mary (2022)
- Unfit to Print: A Modern Media Satire (2023)
- Burnt Cove (2026)
