= St. Mary Academy – Bay View =

Girls school in Riverside, Rhode Island, United States

Location
- 3070 Pawtucket Avenue; Riverside (East Providence), Rhode Island 02915; United States; 41°47′25″N 71°21′50″W

Information
- Type: Private, all-girls, college preparatory
- Religious affiliation: Roman Catholic
- Established: 1874
- President: Ms. Amy Gravell
- Principal: Dr. Marcela Rossi
- Grades: PK–12
- Enrollment: 421 (2021–2022)
- Campus size: 20 acres (81,000 m^{2})
- Colors: Blue and Gold
- Slogan: "Nothing is more beneficial to society than the education of women." – Catherine McAuley
- Mascot: Bengal
- Team name: Bay View Bengals
- Accreditation: New England Association of Schools and Colleges
- Publication: Bay View Today Magazine
- Yearbook: The McAuleyan
- Website: bayviewacademy.org

St. Mary Academy – Bay View is an all-girls Catholic school, serving girls and young women from pre-school through grade twelve. Bay View is located in Riverside, Rhode Island. It was founded by the Religious Sisters of Mercy in 1874. It is located in the Roman Catholic Diocese of Providence.

== History ==
St. Mary Academy – Bay View was founded in 1874 by the Sisters of Mercy. From 1892 to 1910 Mary Matthew Doyle, founder and first president of Salve Regina University, taught at Bay View.

In the spring of 1991, the United States Department of Education recognized St. Mary Academy-Bay View as a Blue-Ribbon School of Excellence and the school was renewed as a Blue-Ribbon School of Excellence in 2002.

== Campus ==
The St. Mary Academy – Bay View campus is 20 acres (81,000 m^{2}) found on Pawtucket Avenue in Riverside, Rhode Island. There are four buildings: St. Joseph Hall, Mercy Hall, McAuley Hall, and the Athletic Wellness Center.

== Notable alumnae ==
- Olivia Culpo ('10), Miss Rhode Island USA 2012, Miss USA 2012, Miss Universe 2012.
- Elisabeth Hasselbeck ('95), Survivor (U.S. TV series) contestant; former co-host of ABC's The View.
- Katherine Kazarian ('08), member of the Rhode Island General Assembly
- Danielle Lacourse ('04), Miss Rhode Island USA 2007, 1st Runner-Up at Miss USA 2007
- Pamela J. Lauria ('88), Rhode Island State Senator from District 32 since 2023.
- Maureen McKenna Goldberg ('69), Justice of the Rhode Island Supreme Court.
- Lt. Col. and Senator Martha McSally ('84), US Air Force pilot, first woman to fly a solo combat mission, highest ranking woman in the United States Air Force. She won suit against the Department of Defense after she was required to wear the body-covering abaya while stationed in Saudi Arabia. United States Senator from Arizona 2019–2020.
- Eileen S. Naughton, Democratic member of the Rhode Island House of Representatives.
- Gina Tognoni ('91), actress and Daytime Emmy award winner

== Bay View in fiction ==
Bay View was referred to on the show Brotherhood, when a character's daughter attended "St. Mary's Academy at the Bay View". The portion of the show which occurred at "St. Mary's Academy at the Bay View" was filmed at Bay View.

== See also ==
- Bishop Keough Regional High School – Another all-girls' school in Rhode Island
- Catholic schools in the United States
- Higher education
- List of Rhode Island schools
- Parochial school
