= Dan Barry (reporter) =

American journalist

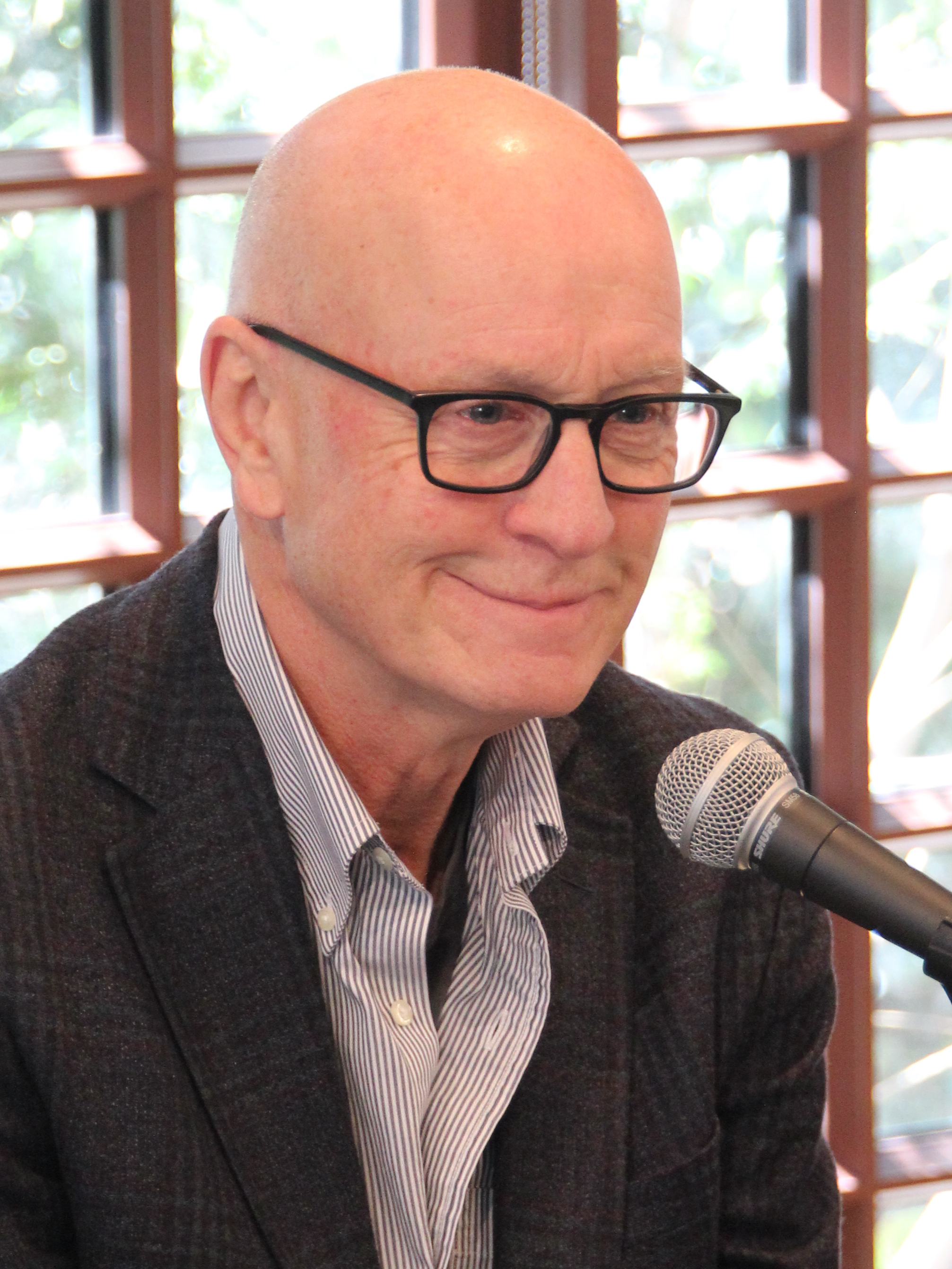
- Barry in 2025
- Born: 1958 (age 67–68); New York City, U.S.
- Education: St. Bonaventure University (BA); New York University (MA)
- Occupations: journalist, columnist, author
- Notable work: "This Land" The New York Times column "About New York" The New York Times column Bottom of the 33rd Pull Me Up: A Memoir; City Lights: Stories About New York; The Boys in the Bunkhouse; This Land: America, Lost and Found
- Spouse: Mary Trinity
- Children: 2

Dan Barry (born 1958) is an American journalist. He is a columnist and features writer for The New York Times. He is the author of five books, including This Land: America, Lost and Found, a collection of his national columns for The Times that was published in 2018.

== Biography ==
Barry, whose father was from Brooklyn and whose mother was from County Galway, Ireland, was born in Queens, N.Y., and raised in Deer Park, N.Y. He graduated from St. Anthony's High School (now in Huntington, N.Y.) in 1976, when it was an all-boys high school in Smithtown, N.Y. His experiences at St. Anthony's figure in his memoir, Pull Me Up. He graduated from St. Bonaventure University in 1980 with a bachelor's degree in mass communications and received a master's degree in journalism from New York University.

In 1983, after years working as a delicatessen clerk and ditch digger, Barry joined The Journal Inquirer in Manchester, Conn., as a reporter, and moved to the Providence Journal-Bulletin in 1987. In 1992, he won a shared Polk Award for investigating the causes of a state banking crisis. In 1994, he was part of a Journal-Bulletin investigative team that won the Pulitzer Prize for Investigative Reporting after exposing corruption in the Rhode Island court system.

Barry joined The New York Times in 1995. He served as Long Island bureau chief, police bureau chief, City Hall bureau chief, and general assignment reporter for the Metropolitan desk before resurrecting the "About New York column" in 2003. Then, in 2007, he began the "This Land" column, which took him to all 50 states over the course of a decade. He now specializes in long-form narratives.

His writing also appears in several non-fiction anthologies.

His 2017 article about the child burials at Bon Secours Mother and Baby Home has been made into a narrative feature film produced by Liam Neeson that won Best Irish Film at the 2026 Galway Film Fleadh.

== Personal life ==
Barry lives in Maplewood, NJ, with his wife, Mary Trinity, and two daughters.

== Awards ==
- 1994 Pulitzer Prize for Investigative Reporting for exposing corruption in the Rhode Island court system
- Pulitzer finalist in 2006, for his coverage of post-Hurricane Katrina New Orleans and life in New York City
- Pulitzer finalist in 2010, for his coverage of how the Great Recession changed lives and relationships in America
- 1992 shared Polk Award for investigating the causes of a state banking crisis
- 2003 American Society of Newspaper Editors Award for deadline reporting, for his coverage of the first anniversary of Sept. 11
- the 2005 Mike Berger Award, which honors in-depth human interest reporting
- the 2010 Sigma Delta Chi Award for column writing from the Society for Professional Journalists
- 2015 Best American Newspaper Narrative award
- In May 2016, Barry was given an honorary doctorate by his alma mater, St. Bonaventure University, after which he delivered the commencement address for the graduating class of 2016.
- In 2018, Barry was named recipient of the Story in the Public Square, awarded by the Pell Center for International Relations and Public Policy

== Bibliography ==
- Pull Me Up (2004) — memoir of Barry's Long Island Irish Catholic upbringing and battle with cancer
- City Lights: Stories About New York (2007) — collection of Barry's "About New York" columns
- Bottom of the 33rd: Hope, Redemption, and Baseball’s Longest Game (HarperCollins, 2011; paperback March 2012) — about the longest game in professional baseball history
- The Boys in the Bunkhouse: Servitude and Salvation in the Heartland (HarperCollins, 2016) – about the exploitation of a group of Texas men with intellectual disability who worked for decades in a turkey-processing plant in eastern Iowa
- This Land: America, Lost and Found (Black Dog & Leventhal, 2018) – a collection of Barry's national "This Land" columns.
