= Seth C. Bradford =

American architect

- Born: 1801
- Died: 1878 (aged 76–77)
- Occupation: Architect
- Buildings: Rockry Hall, Belair, Chateau-sur-Mer, Fairlawn

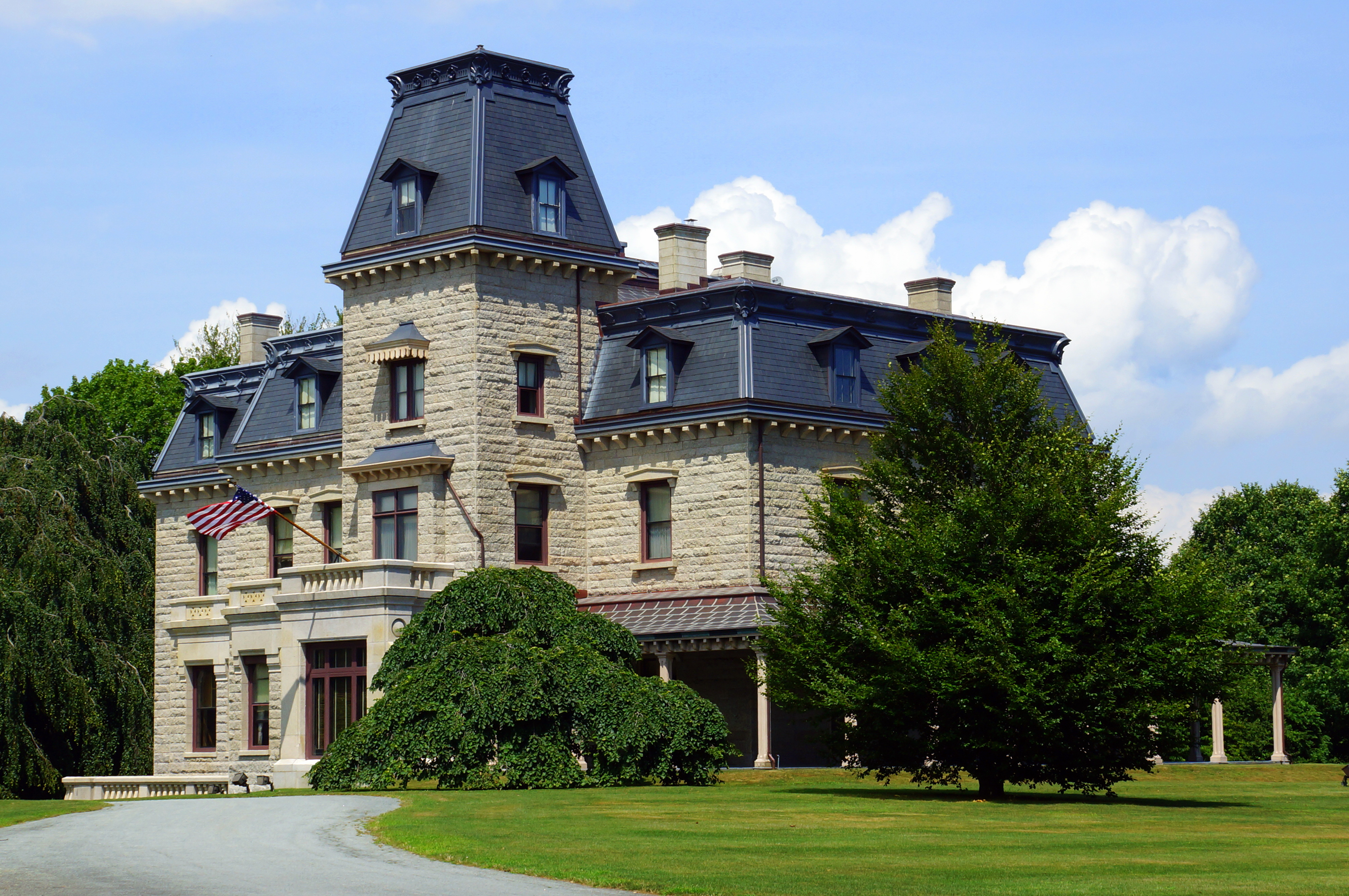
Chateau-sur-Mer, Newport, 1851.

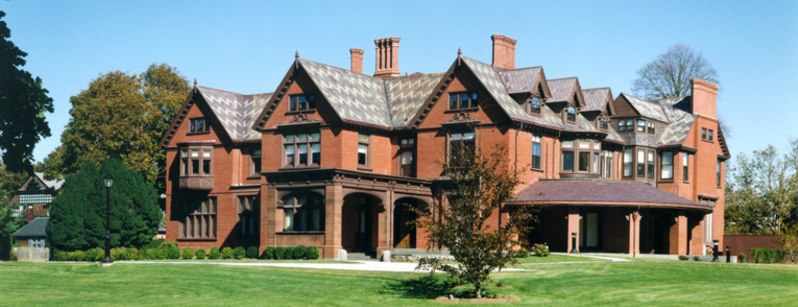
Fairlawn, Newport, 1852.

Seth C. Bradford (1801-1878) was an American architect from Newport, Rhode Island.

During his career, Bradford was known as a designer and builder of Italianate-style residences for Newport summer residents. At least three of his designs utilized a Gothic Revival vocabulary, most blatantly Rockry Hall (1847–48), modeled on Design III from Andrew Jackson Downing's pattern book Cottage Residences (1842).

Today, he is most remembered for his design of Chateau-sur-Mer, the Wetmore family residence on Bellevue Avenue. In addition to being Bellevue Avenue's first great mansion, it is also credited with introducing the Second Empire style to Newport (although the original mansard has since been replaced).

His popularity in Newport waned in the late 1850s, as other architects like Thomas A. Tefft, Richard Morris Hunt, and George C. Mason began to exert their influence.

== Architectural works ==
- 1847 - Charles Lyman Cottage, 66 Webster St, Newport, Rhode Island
- 1847 - Rockry Hall (Albert Sumner Cottage), 425 Bellevue Ave, Newport, Rhode Island
- 1849 - James H. Van Alen Cottage, 424 Bellevue Ave, Newport, Rhode Island
  - Burned in 1851
- 1850 - Belair (H. Allan Wright Cottage), 50 Old Beach Rd, Newport, Rhode Island
  - Remodeled by Dudley Newton in 1870
- 1850 - Ralph S. Izard Cottage, 10 Pell St, Newport, Rhode Island
- 1851 - Mary A. D. Bruen Cottage, 6 Howe Ave, Newport, Rhode Island
  - Remodeled by R. M. Hunt in 1870-72
- 1851 - Chateau-sur-Mer (William S. Wetmore House), 424 Bellevue Ave, Newport, Rhode Island
- 1852 - Fairlawn (Andrew Ritchie Cottage), Bellevue & Ruggles Aves, Newport, Rhode Island
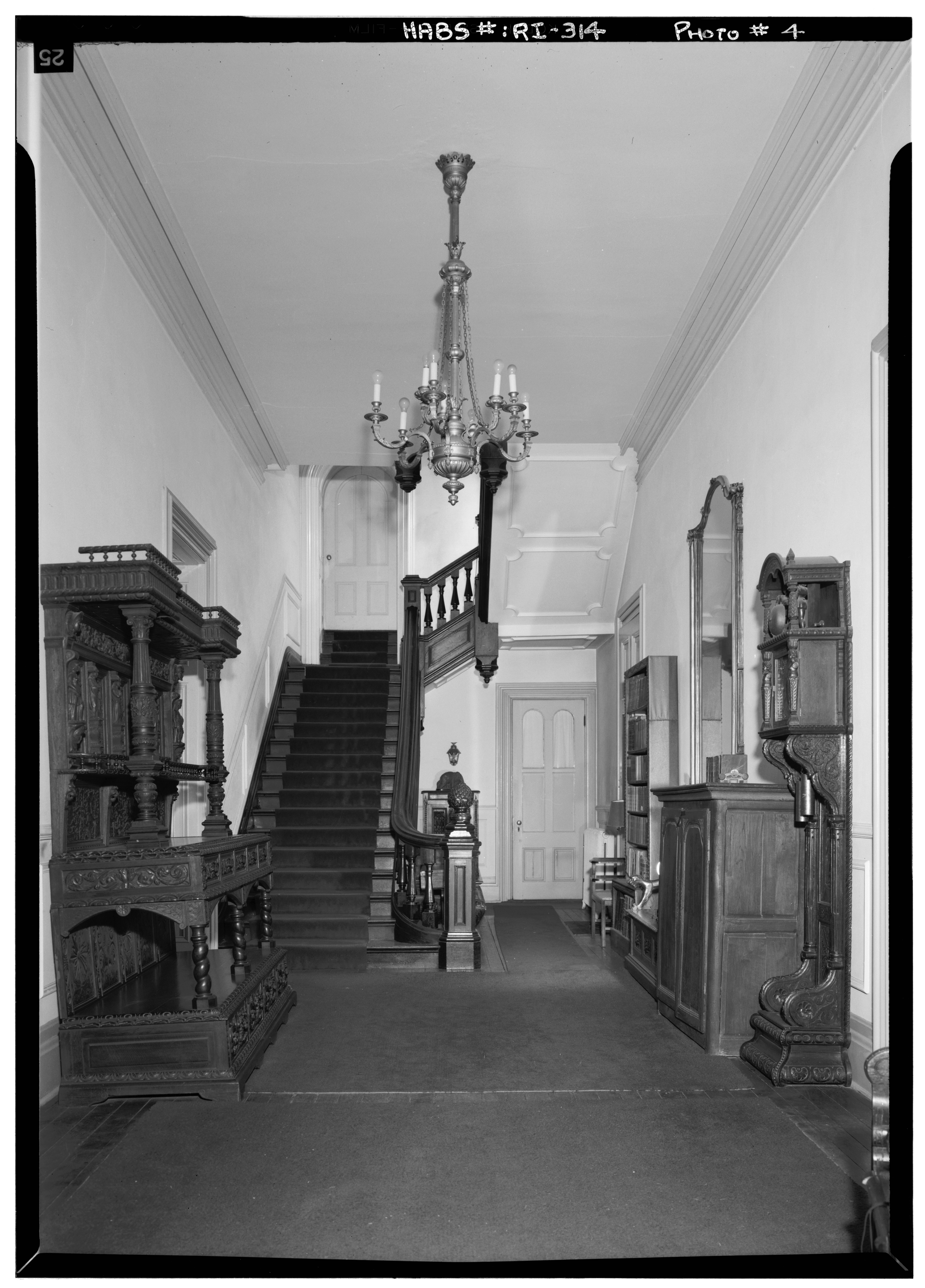
- Porter Villa, Newport, 1855.
  1852 - Robert M. Mason Cottage, 180 Rhode Island Ave, Newport, Rhode Island
  - Remodeled by H. H. Richardson in 1883. Burned 1899.
- 1855 - Porter Villa (James C. Porter Cottage), 23 Greenough Pl, Newport, Rhode Island
- 1859 - Gatehouse, Beach Cliffe (Oliver DeLancey Kane Estate), 77 Memorial Blvd, Newport, Rhode Island
