= Javier Manzano =

Mexican photographer

Javier Manzano (born 1975) is a Mexican American filmmaker and photojournalist best known for his coverage of Latin America and the Middle East.

== Life and career ==
Manzano was born in Mexico but moved to the United States with his family when he was 18 years old. His camera work has appeared in National Geographic, VICE on HBO, Showtime, Hulu, Amazon Video, Channel 4, BBC and PBS and other news outlets.

== Pulitzer ==
Manzano's Pulitzer Prize–winning photograph was taken in October 2012 at the Karm-al Jabal district of Aleppo, Syria. It shows two Free Syrian Army soldiers guarding a sniper's nest as light streams through bullet holes in the wall behind them. Manzano is the first freelance photographer to be awarded the prize in 17 years, when Charles Porter IV and Stephanie Welsh won in 1996.

== Awards ==
- 2011 World Press Photo Award
- 2013 World Press Photo Award
- 2013 Pulitzer Prize for feature photography
- 2013 Bayeux-Calvados Award for war correspondents
- 2016 Pell Center Prize for Story in the Public Square
- 2020 Emmy Award BEST STORY IN A NEWSCAST - Director of Photography
- 2020 Emmy Award OUTSTANDING CONTINUING COVERAGE OF A NEWS STORY IN A NEWSCAST - Director of Photography
- 2022 The Edward R. Murrow Award - Best TV, video or documentary 30 minutes for “Yemen's Children of War” - Director of Photography.
- 2022 Peabody Awards “Transnational” - Director of Photography.
- 43rd Emmy Award OUTSTANDING CONTINUING NEWS COVERAGE: LONG FORM - "Yemen's Forgotten War" VICE NEWS TONIGHT - Director of Photography
- 43rd Emmy Award BEST NEWS COVERAGE: LONG FORM - "Return of the Taliban: A VICE News Special Report" Showtime - Director of Photography
- 43rd Emmy Award OUTSTANDING VIDEO JOURNALISM: NEWS - "Return of the Taliban: A VICE News Special Report" Showtime - Director of Photography
- 44th Emmy Award OUTSTANDING BUSINESS, CONSUMER OR ECONOMIC COVERAGE: LONG FORM - "The Price of Purity" VICE NEWS ON SHOWTIME - Director of Photography
- 44th Emmy Award OUTSTANDING VIDEO JOURNALISM - "The Price of Purity" VICE NEWS ON SHOWTIME - Director of Photography
- 45th Emmy Award HARD NEWS LONG FORM - "INSIDE WAGNER" VICE NEWS - Director of Photography
- 46th Emmy Award OUTSTANDING VIDEO JOURNALISM - "A HIDDEN WAR" SCRIPPS NEWS - Director of Photography
