= James W. Nuttall =

United States Army general

Nuttall, James W.
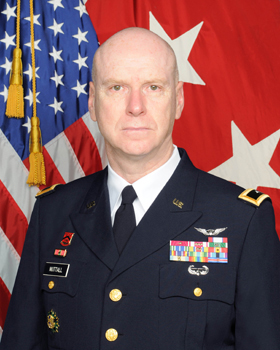
- Major General James W. Nuttall as deputy commander of First Army
- Born: 1953 (age 72–73); Smithfield, Rhode Island, U.S.
- Military career
- Allegiance: United States of America
- Branch: United States Army
- Service years: 1971–2011
- Rank: Major general
- Units: Rhode Island Army National Guard; Army National Guard
- Commands: A Battery, 2nd Battalion, 103rd Field Artillery Regiment; 1st Battalion, 103rd Field Artillery Regiment; 103rd Field Artillery Brigade
- Awards: Distinguished Service Medal (U.S. Army); Legion of Merit; Meritorious Service Medal; Army Commendation Medal; Army Achievement Medal

James W. Nuttall (born 1953) is a retired United States Army major general who served as deputy director of the Army National Guard and deputy commander of the United States First Army.

== Early life ==
Nuttall was born in Smithfield, Rhode Island in 1953. He graduated from Smithfield High School in 1971.

== Start of military career ==
Nuttall enlisted in the Rhode Island National Guard in 1971. In 1975 he graduated from Officer Candidate School and received his commission as a second lieutenant of Artillery.

Nuttall completed several command and staff assignments in Rhode Island, including: commander, A Battery, 2nd Battalion, 103rd Field Artillery Regiment (1980–1982); commander, 1st Battalion, 103rd Field Artillery Regiment (1995–1996); and commander, 103rd Field Artillery Brigade (1997–2000).

In August 2000 Nuttall began several assignments outside Rhode Island, including: deputy assistant commandant - Army National Guard, United States Army Field Artillery School (2000–2002); assistant chief of staff - Army National Guard, Headquarters, United States Army Training and Doctrine Command (2002–2003); and chief of staff, Army National Guard, Army National Guard Readiness Center (2003–2004).

== Later military career ==
In November, 2004 Nuttall was promoted to brigadier general and assigned as deputy director for operations, readiness and mobilization in the office of the Army's Deputy Chief of Staff for Operations (G 3/5/7).

In July, 2006 he was assigned as deputy director of the Army National Guard. He was promoted to major general in 2007.

In June, 2009 Nuttall was appointed as deputy commanding general - Army National Guard for the United States First Army. He served in this position until retiring in 2011.

== Civilian career ==
Prior to beginning assignments outside Rhode Island in 2000, Nuttall lived in the Providence, Rhode Island area and worked as a Division I baseball umpire for the Eastern College Athletic Conference.

Since retiring from the military, Nuttall has again worked as a college baseball umpire.

== Education ==
Nutall completed the Field Artillery Officer Basic and Advanced Courses and is a 1988 graduate of the United States Army Command and General Staff College.

In 1991 Nuttall completed a Bachelor of Science degree in Business Administration at Roger Williams University. He completed a Master of Arts degree in International Relations at Salve Regina University in 1995.

Nuttall is a 1997 graduate of the United States Army War College. In 2009 he completed the CAPSTONE course at the National Defense University.

== Personal ==
In the 2024 United States presidential election, Nuttall endorsed Kamala Harris.

== Awards ==
- Army Distinguished Service Medal
- Legion of Merit (with Bronze Oak Leaf Cluster)
- Meritorious Service Medal (with 3 Bronze Oak Leaf Clusters)
- Army Commendation Medal (with 1 Bronze Oak Leaf Cluster)
- Army Achievement Medal
- Army Reserve Components Achievement Medal (with 2 Bronze Oak Leaf Clusters)
- National Defense Service Medal (with Bronze Service Star)
- Global War on Terrorism Service Medal
- Armed Forces Service Medal
- Humanitarian Service Medal
- Armed Forces Reserve Medal (with Gold Hourglass)
- Army Service Ribbon
- Army Reserve Components Overseas Training Ribbon (with Numeral 3)
- Air Assault Badge
- Aircrew Badge
- Army Staff Identification Badge
- Army Superior Unit Award (with one Bronze Oak Leaf Cluster)

=== Additional awards ===
Nuttall is a 2011 recipient of the National Infantry Association's Order of Saint Maurice (Primicerius).

== Effective dates of promotions ==
- Major general, August 2, 2007
- Brigadier general, November 8, 2004
- Colonel, September 2, 1997
- Lieutenant colonel, July 15, 1991
- Major, December 16, 1985
- Captain, January 14, 1980
- First lieutenant, August 10, 1978
- Second lieutenant, August 11, 1975

== Chronological list of assignments ==
1. August 1975 – January 1976, ammunition officer, Headquarters and Headquarters Battery, 2nd Battalion, 103rd Field Artillery, Providence, Rhode Island
2. January 1976 – April 1976, student, Field Artillery Officer Basic Course, United States Army Field Artillery School, Fort Sill, Oklahoma
3. May 1976 – October 1978, reconnaissance/survey officer, Headquarters and Headquarters Battery, 1st Battalion, 103rd Field Artillery, Providence, Rhode Island
4. November 1978 – June 1980, personnel officer/S-1, 2nd Battalion, 103rd Field Artillery, Providence, Rhode Island
5. July 1980 - March 1982, commander, Alpha Battery, 2nd Battalion, 103rd Field Artillery, Providence, Rhode Island
6. March 1982 – November 1983, intelligence officer/S-2, 1st Battalion, 103rd Field Artillery, Providence, Rhode Island
7. December 1983 – December 1984, personnel officer/S-1 1st Battalion, 103rd Field Artillery, Providence, Rhode Island
8. January 1985 – November 1985, assistant operations officer/S-3, 1st Battalion 103rd Field Artillery, Providence, Rhode Island
9. November 1985 – July 1988, operations officer/S-3, 1st Battalion, 103rd Field Artillery, Providence, Rhode Island
10. August 1988 – December 1988, student, Command and General Staff College, Fort Leavenworth, Kansas
11. January 1989 – April 1990, executive officer, 2nd Battalion, 103rd Field Artillery, Providence, Rhode Island
12. May 1990 – January 1991, executive officer, 1st Battalion, 103rd Field Artillery, Providence, Rhode Island
13. January 1991 – April 1991, force integration readiness officer, Headquarters, Rhode Island State Area Command, Rhode Island Army National Guard, Providence, Rhode Island
14. April 1991 – August 1992, mobilization plans officer, Headquarters, Rhode Island State Area Command, Rhode Island Army National Guard, Providence, Rhode Island
15. September 1992 – July 1993, chief, plans, operations and military support officer, State Area Command, Rhode Island Army National Guard, Providence, Rhode Island
16. July 1993 – December 1994, operations officer/S-3, 103rd Field Artillery Brigade, Providence, Rhode Island
17. January 1995 – July 1996, commander, 1st Battalion, 103rd Field Artillery, Providence, Rhode Island
18. July 1996 – May 1997, director of surface maintenance, Rhode Island Army National Guard, Providence, Rhode Island
19. May 1997 – August 1997, executive officer, 103rd Field Artillery Brigade, Providence, Rhode Island
20. August 1997 – July, 2000, commander, 103rd Field Artillery Brigade, Providence Rhode Island
21. August 2000 – June 2002, deputy assistant commandant-Army National Guard, United States Army Field Artillery School, Fort Sill, Oklahoma
22. June 2002 – March 2003, assistant chief of staff-Army National Guard, Headquarters, United States Army Training Doctrine Command, Fort Monroe, Virginia
23. March 2003 – November 2004, chief of staff, Army National Guard, Army National Guard Readiness Center, Arlington, Virginia
24. November 2004 – July 2006, deputy director for operations, readiness and mobilization, United States Army G-3/5/7, Washington, D.C.
25. July 2006 – May 2009, deputy director, Army National Guard, Arlington Hall, Arlington, Virginia
26. June 2009 – June 2011, deputy commanding general, Army National Guard, Headquarters, First Army, Fort Gillem, Forest Park, Georgia

== External resources ==
- James W. Nuttall at National Guard Bureau, General Officer Management Office
- James W. Nuttall Rides National Guard Bike at Rolling Thunder 2008 on YouTube
