= Edward P. Denning =

American architect

Edward Patrick Denning
- Born: July 25, 1926; Providence, Rhode Island, U.S.
- Died: August 20, 2003 (aged 77)
- Occupation: Architect

Edward Patrick Denning (1926–2003) was an American architect from East Providence, Rhode Island. He was a well-known architect of public buildings and churches in 1960s and 1970s Rhode Island.

Denning was born July 25, 1926, in Providence. In 1950, he graduated from the architectural program of the University of Notre Dame. His professional practice began in 1960 when he became partner of East Providence architect E. James Kurtz. The firm was expanded in 1965 to be Kurtz, Denning & Gazda. Denning established his own firm, Edward P. Denning & Associates, in 1966. He practiced as a member of this firm for the rest of his career. His home was located in the southern part of East Providence proper. He died August 20, 2003.

== Architectural works ==
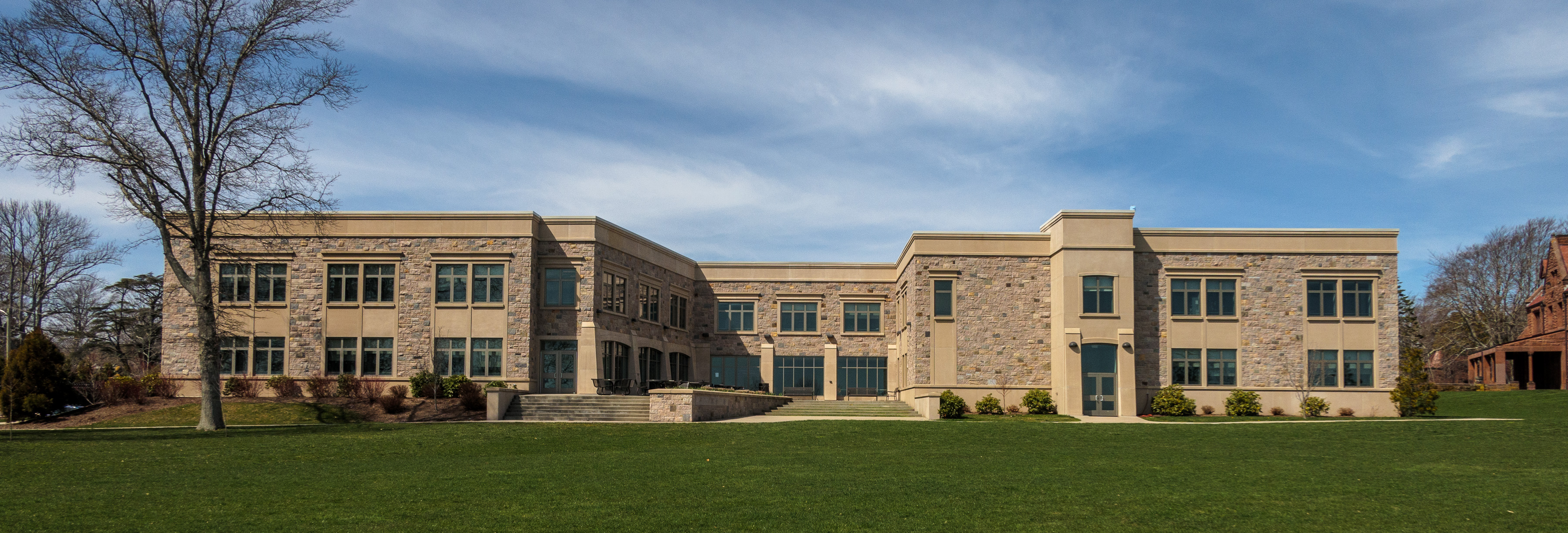
O'Hare Academic Center, Salve Regina University (1968)

Kurtz & Denning, 1960-1965:

- Espirito Santo R. C. Church, 311 Alden St., Fall River, MA (1962)
- O'Hare Academic Center, Salve Regina College, Newport, RI (1964–67) - The project was completed by Kurtz alone after the firm's dissolution.
- Johnston Sr. High School, 345 Cherry Hill Rd., Johnston, RI (1965) - With Russillo & Butler.

Kurtz, Denning & Gazda, 1965-1966:

- St. Barnabas R. C. Church, 1697 E. Main Rd., Portsmouth, RI (1965)

Edward P. Denning & Associates, from 1966:

- St. Brendan's R. C. Church, 60 Turner Ave., Riverside, RI (1967)
- Cumberland High School Annex, 2600 Mendon Rd., Cumberland, RI (1969)
- Bathhouse, Second Beach, Middletown, RI (1974)
- Edward R. Martin Middle School, 111 Brown St., East Providence, RI (1977)
- Tiverton Middle School, 10 Quintal Dr., Tiverton, RI (1976)
- Middletown Public Library, 700 W. Main Rd., Middletown, RI (1978) - Altered.
