= Chateau-sur-Mer =

Historic house in Rhode Island, United States

- U.S. National Register of Historic Places
- U.S. National Historic Landmark
- U.S. National Historic Landmark District – Contributing property
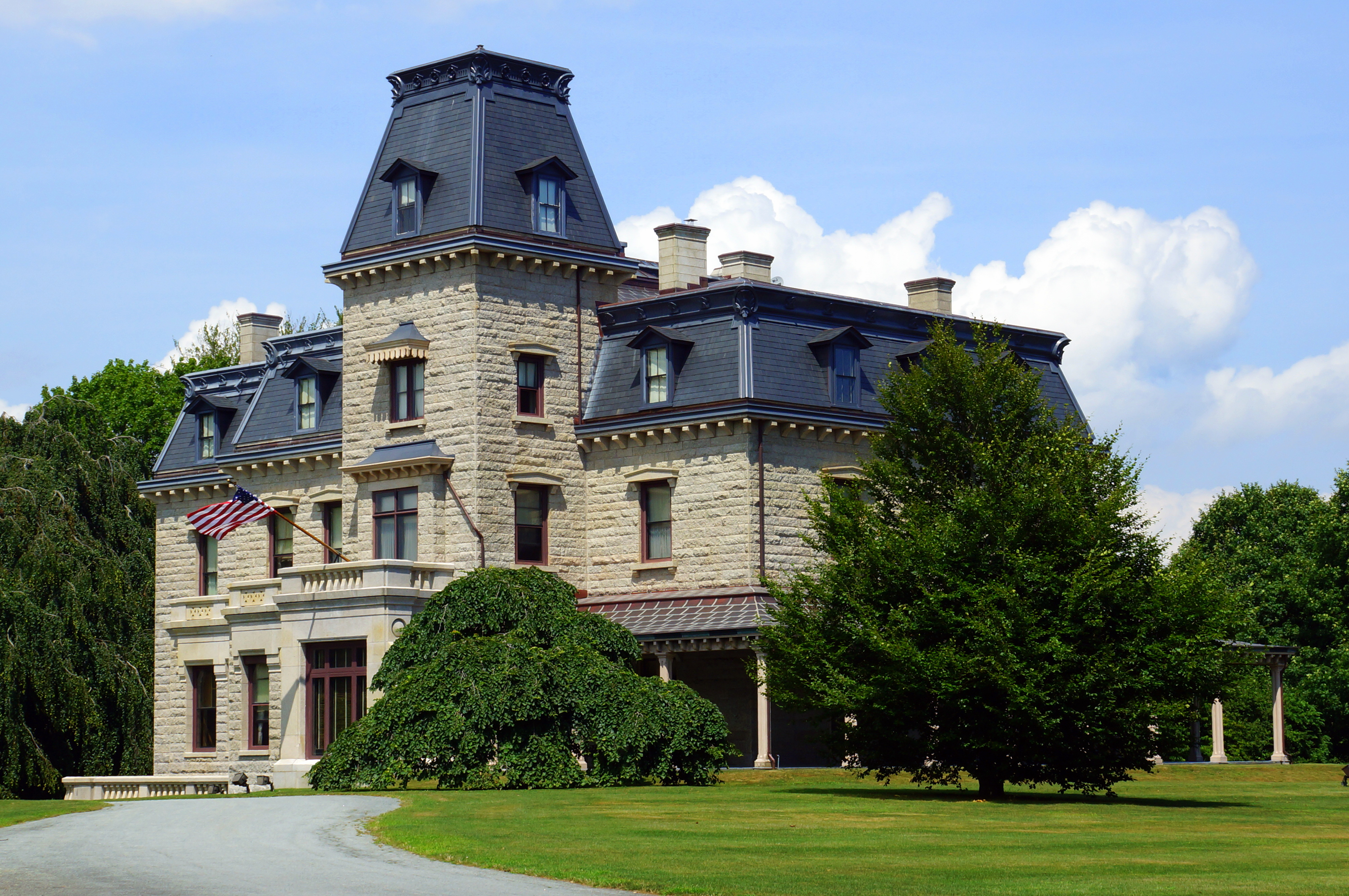
- Chateau-sur-Mer, Newport, Rhode Island.

- Location within Rhode Island Location within the United States
- Interactive map showing the location of Chateau-sur-Mer
- Location: 474 Bellevue Avenue, Newport, Rhode Island
- Coordinates: 41°28′16.5″N 71°18′19″W
- Area: 17 acres (69,000 m^{2})
- Built: 1851
- Architect: Seth C. Bradford (construction) Richard Morris Hunt (renovations) Ogden Codman, Jr. (design)
- Architectural style: Mid 19th Century Revival
- Part of: Bellevue Avenue Historic District (ID72000023)
- NRHP reference No.: 68000002

Significant dates
- Added to NRHP: November 8, 1968
- Designated NHL: February 17, 2006
- Designated NHLDCP: December 8, 1972

Chateau-sur-Mer is one of the first grand Bellevue Avenue mansions of the Gilded Age in Newport, Rhode Island. Located at 474 Bellevue Avenue, it is now owned by the Preservation Society of Newport County and is open to the public as a museum. Chateau-sur-Mer's grand scale and lavish parties ushered in the Gilded Age of Newport, as it was the most palatial residence in Newport until the Vanderbilt houses in the 1890s. It was designated a National Historic Landmark in 2006.

== Description and history ==
Chateau-sur-Mer was completed in 1852 as an Italianate villa for William Shepard Wetmore, a merchant in the Old China Trade originally of St. Albans, Vermont. The architect and builder was Seth C. Bradford, and the structure is constructed of Fall River Granite. It is regarded as a landmark of Victorian architecture, furniture, wallpapers, ceramics, and stenciling.

Wetmore died on June 16, 1862, at Chateau-sur-Mer, leaving the bulk of his fortune to his son George Peabody Wetmore. George married Edith Keteltas in 1869. During the 1870s, the Wetmores departed on an extended trip to Europe, leaving architect Richard Morris Hunt to remodel and redecorate the house in the French Second Empire style. As a result, Chateau-sur-Mer displays most of the major design trends of the last half of the 19th century. Hunt's alterations greatly expanded the house, adding a new three-story wing, a porte-cochere, and a projecting four-story tower with mansard roof. The carriage house was also enlarged, in a manner sympathetic to Bradford's original design. Hunt also designed the entrance gate of the estate which is somewhat Greek Revival in style, but with posts modeled after Egyptian obelisks.

The centerpiece of the mansion's interior is its great hall, a massive three-story chamber with a 45-foot (14 m) ceiling and broad balconies. The billiard room is in the Eastlake style, with oak timbers aligned diagonally on the ceiling and herringbone flooring. The library has an Italianate design and was actually designed and built in Italy, then disassembled and transported to Newport. The marble hallway originally served as the house's main entrance and is finished with a variety of different marble colors. It was closed off in 1920 by replacing the main door with a bay window. The green room served as a ladies' reception area and was designed in 1900 by Ogden Codman, Jr. in the Louis XV style. The ballroom is decorated with crystal chandeliers and fine plaster, one of the few rooms that remained relatively unaltered by Hunt's work. The dining room is in Renaissance Revival style and was also built in Italy.

Chateau-sur-Mer was one of the few Newport "cottages" built as a year-round residence, unlike most of the others built during this period, because the Wetmores were a New England family who made Newport their home. George was very active in Rhode Island politics during the late 19th century and a lifelong Republican. He was a member of the Electoral College of 1880 and again in 1884; he was elected Governor of Rhode Island in 1885 and went on to win re-election in 1886, but he was defeated in an attempt for a third term in 1887. In 1894, the Rhode Island General Assembly elected him to the United States Senate, where he remained until 1913.

The house was added to the National Register of Historic Places in 1968 and purchased by the Preservation Society of Newport County in 1969. It was declared a National Historic Landmark in 2006. The former carriage house and stables for the Chateau-Sur-Mer estate are owned by Salve Regina University and are currently being renovated as a center for visual art and preservation known as the Antone Center.

== See also ==
- List of Gilded Age mansions
- List of National Historic Landmarks in Rhode Island
- National Register of Historic Places listings in Newport County, Rhode Island

== Images ==
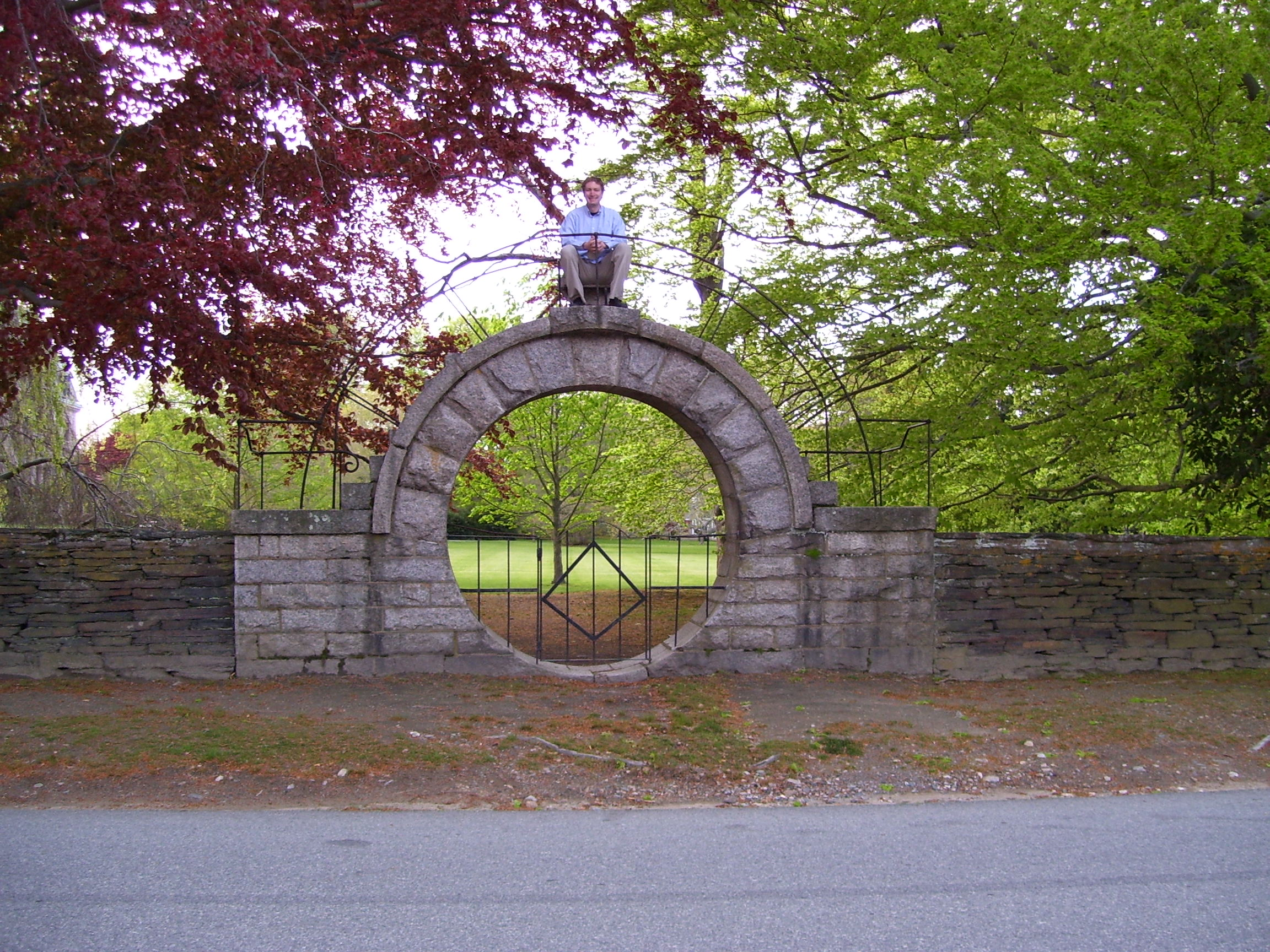
The monkey seat and Moon Gate at Chateau-Sur-Mer

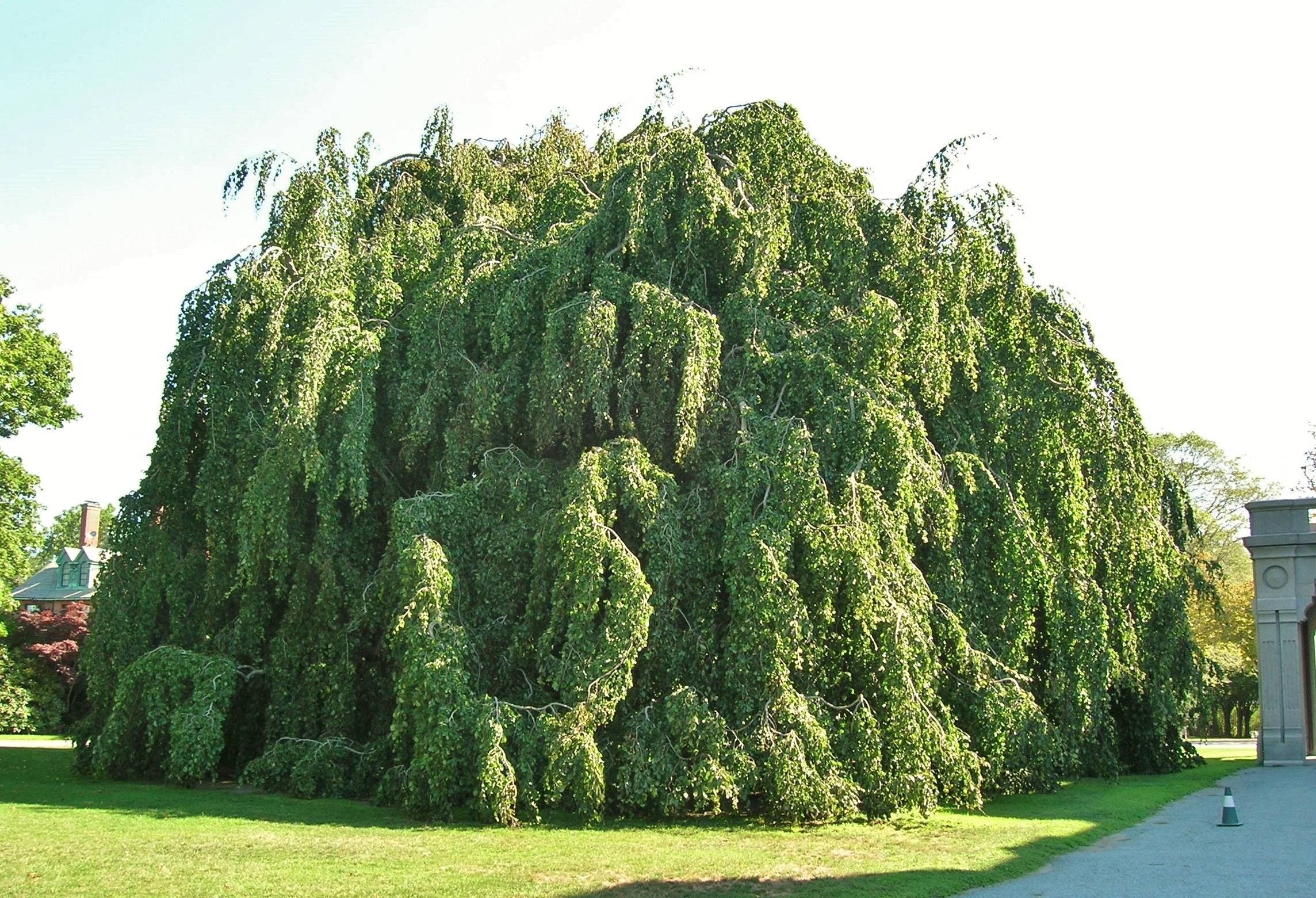
Weeping European Beech at Chateau-Sur-Mer

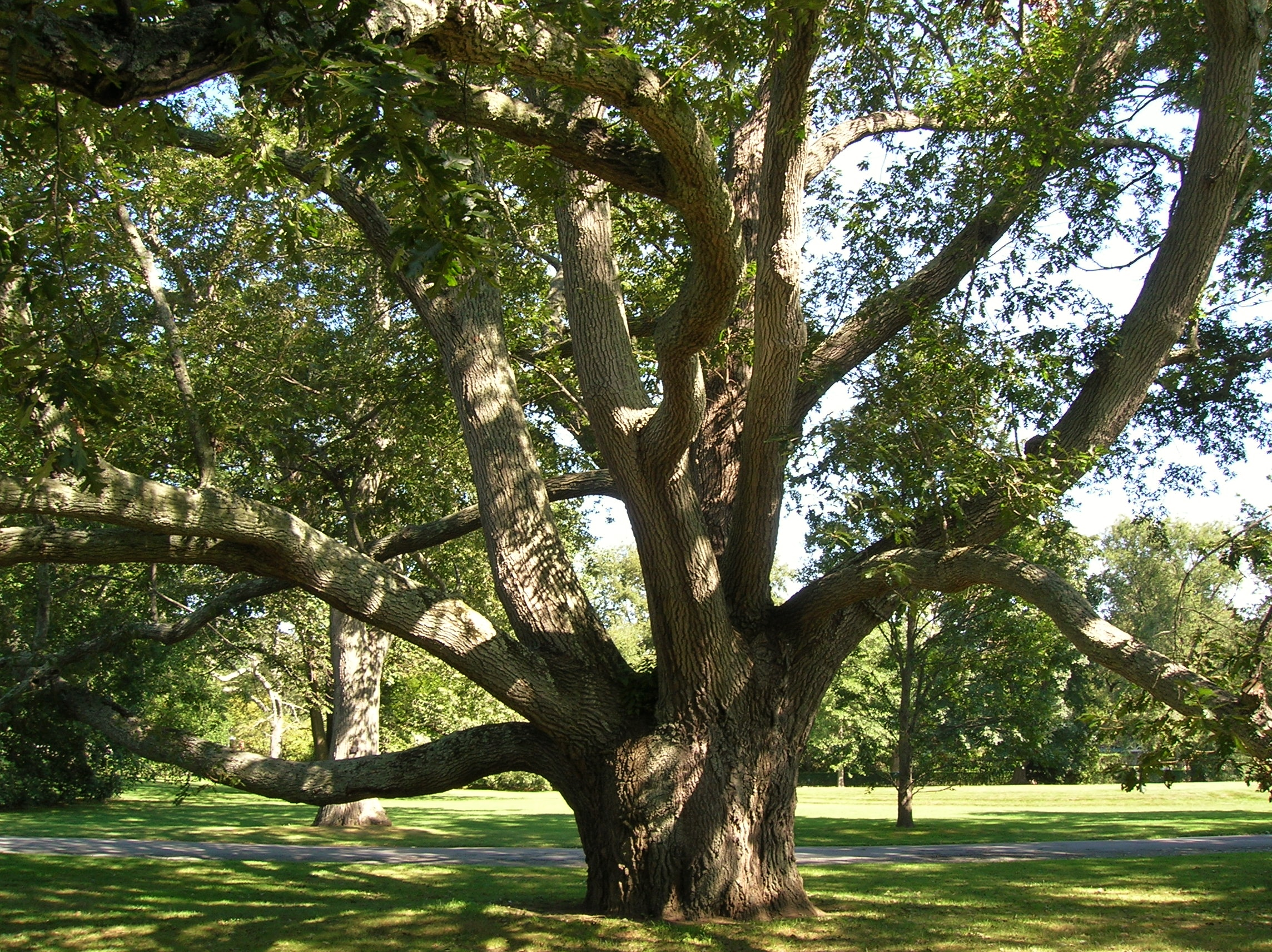
Turkey Oak at Chateau-Sur-Mer

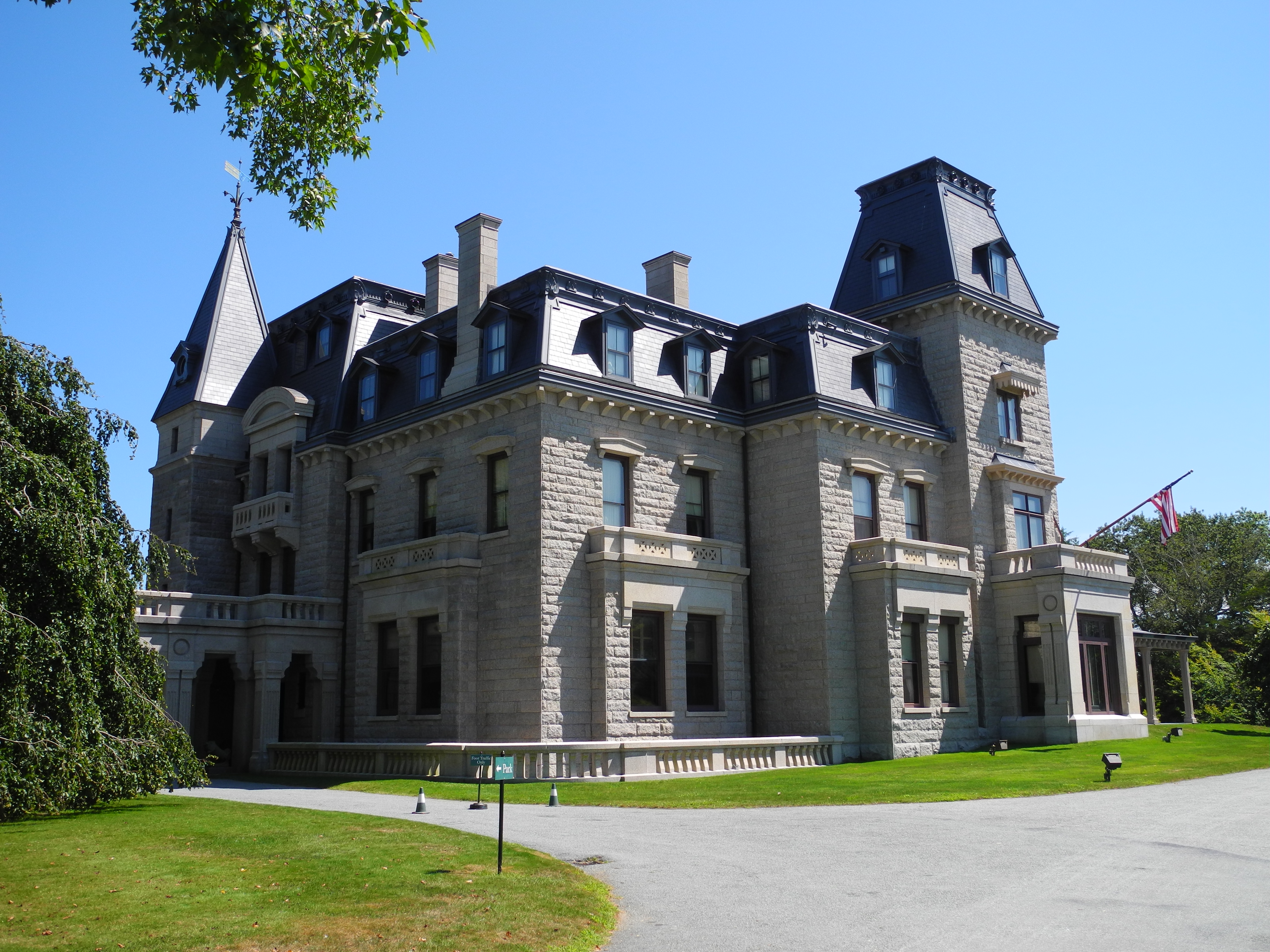
Chateau Sur Mer

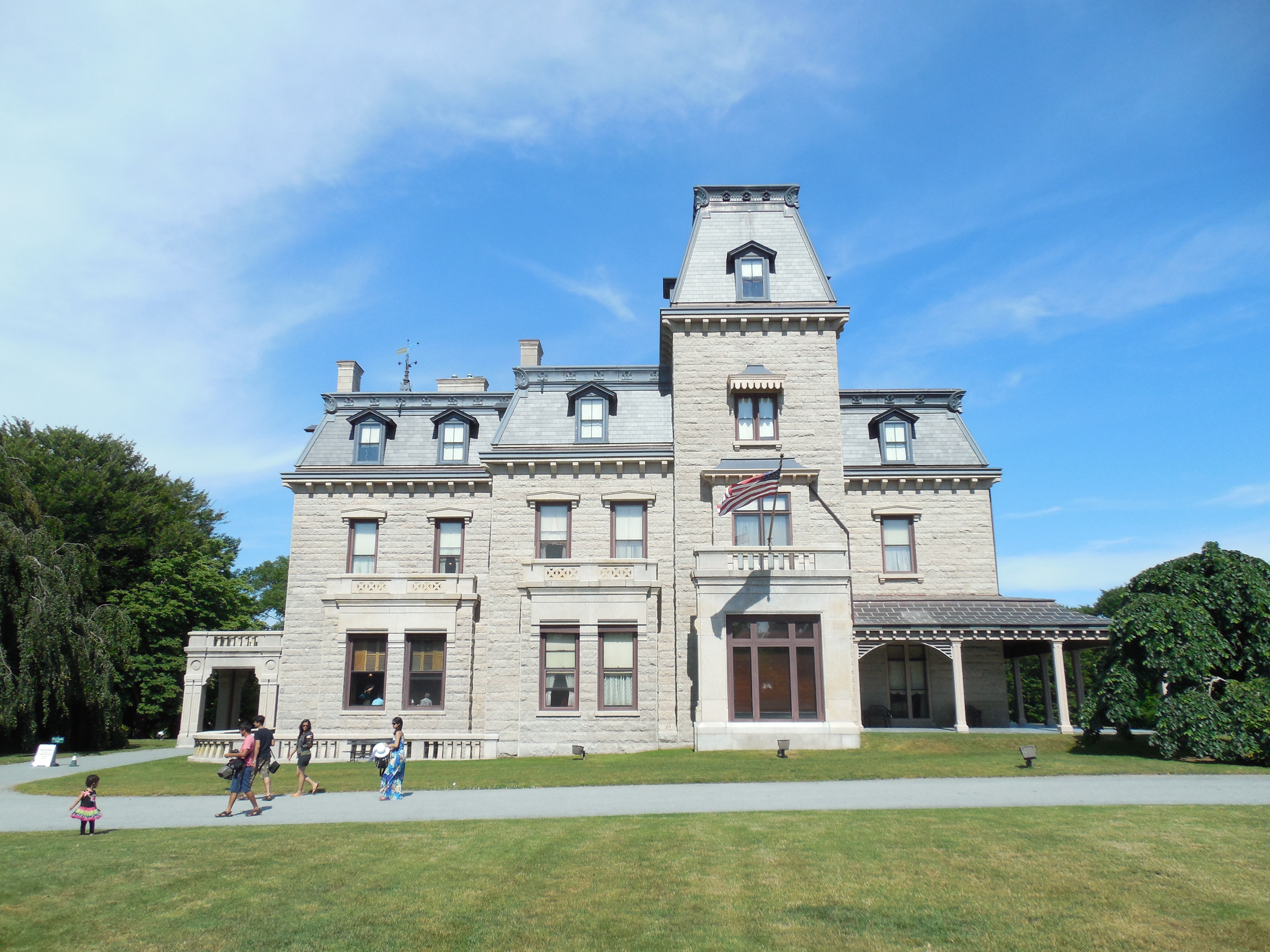
Chateau sur Mer

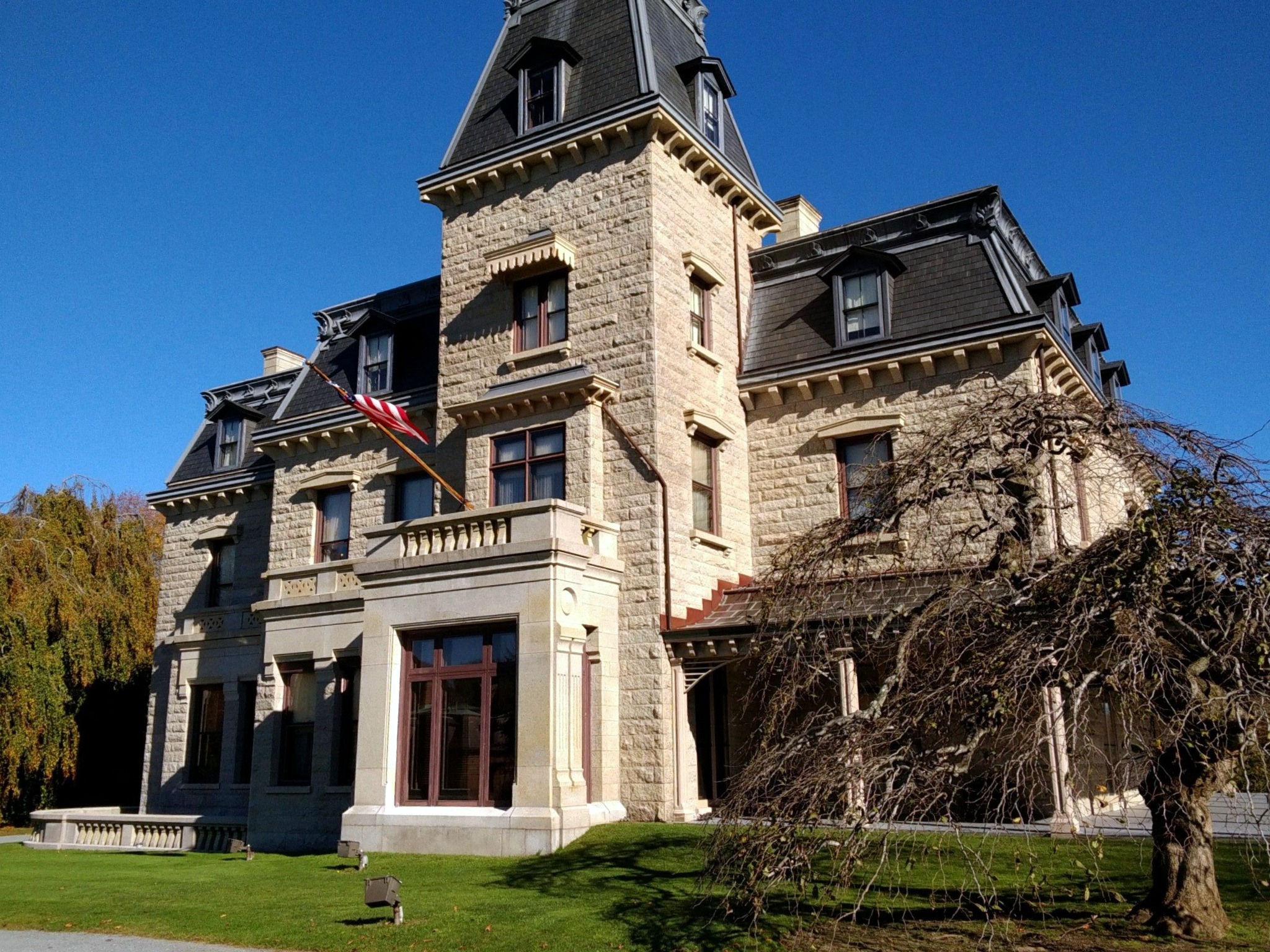
Chateau-sur-Mer front
