= Mary Matthew Doyle =

Roman Catholic nun (1870-1960)

Mary Matthew Doyle (1870–1960) was a Roman Catholic nun and religious leader who was the co-founder and first president of Salve Regina University in Newport, Rhode Island. She was also the first Mother Provincial of the Sisters of Mercy of Providence.

Mary Matthew Doyle was born in Providence, Rhode Island in 1870. She attended St. Francis Xavier Convent in 1890 and officially joined the religious order in 1892. She first taught at St. Mary Academy – Bay View until 1910 when she returned to St. Xavier's Convent. Within six years she became Mother Superior Reverend Mother. In 1929 the Sisters of Mercy in Rhode Island formed the Province of Providence and elected Mary Doyle as the first Mother Provincial serving until 1948. She helped found an active foreign mission in Belize.

As Mother Provincial for the Sisters of Mercy, Doyle co-founded Salve Regina College and served in various positions including as a first incorporator, First Vice-President, First Vice-Chairman, member of the Board of Directors, and first President starting in 1947. She stepped down after a year and was succeeded by Sister Mary Hilda Miley. Doyle began to suffer an illness in 1950, but she lived until 1960, when she died at Mount St. Rita Convent.

Doyle received honorary degrees from Providence College (1926) and the Catholic Teachers College (1932).
