= Bishop Keough Regional High School =

Location
- 145 Power Road; Pawtucket, (Providence County), Rhode Island 02860; United States; 41°51′54″N 71°24′49″W

Information
- Type: Private, All-Girls
- Religious affiliation: Roman Catholic
- Established: 1971
- Closed: 2015
- Grades: 9–12
- Colors: Blue and White
- Team name: Koalas
- Accreditation: New England Association of Schools and Colleges
- Website: http://www.bishopkeough.org/

Bishop Keough Regional High School was a private, Roman Catholic, all-girls high school in Pawtucket, Rhode Island. It was located in the Roman Catholic Diocese of Providence.

== Background ==
Incorporated in 1971, Bishop Keough had students from Pawtucket, Lincoln, North Providence, Cumberland, Smithfield, Woonsocket, Greenville, Johnston, Cranston, Central Falls, East Providence, Providence, and other outlying areas. The school closed in 2015. Current and prospective students were encouraged to enroll at the St. Raphael Academy, a co-educational Catholic high school, also located in Pawtucket.

== See also ==
- Catholic schools in the United States
- Higher education
- List of Rhode Island schools
- Parochial school
- St. Mary Academy – Bay View - Another girls' school in Rhode Island
