= Salve Regina University =

University in Newport, Rhode Island, US

- Former name: Salve Regina College (1934-1991)
- Motto: Maria Spes Nostra
- Motto in English: Mary, Our Hope
- Type: Private university
- Established: 1934; 92 years ago
- Religious affiliation: Roman Catholic (Sisters of Mercy)
- Academic affiliations: Conference for Mercy Higher Education; ACCU; NAICU; Space-grant
- Endowment: $77.4 million (2022)
- Chancellor: M. Therese Antone
- President: Dr. Kelli J. Armstrong
- Provost: Nancy G. Schreiber
- Students: 2,785 (fall 2025)
- Undergraduates: 2,128 (fall 2025)
- Postgraduates: 657 (fall 2025)
- Location: Newport, Rhode Island, U.S. 41°28′26″N 71°17′57″W
- Campus: Suburban
- Colors: Navy, white
- Nickname: Seahawks
- Sporting affiliations: NCAA Division III; NEWMAC, NEHC, NEISA
- Mascot: Seahawk
- Website: salve.edu
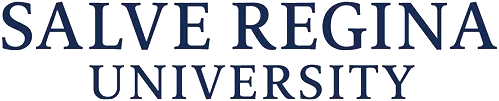

Salve Regina University is a private coeducational Catholic university in Newport, Rhode Island, United States. It was founded in 1934 by the Sisters of Mercy and is accredited by the New England Commission of Higher Education. The university enrolls approximately 2,800 undergraduate and graduate students annually.

Salve's 80-acre historical coastal campus, bordering the Newport Cliff Walk in the state of Rhode Island, is set on seven contiguous Gilded Age estates with 21 structures of historic significance. The university is home to the Pell Center for International Relations and Public Policy.

Salve is a member of the NCAA Division III and the New England Women's and Men's Athletic Conference (NEWMAC). In 2022 about 520 students – about 18% of the student body – participated in intercollegiate athletics.

== History ==
On March 6, 1934, the state of Rhode Island granted a charter to the Sisters of Mercy of Providence for a corporation to be named Salve Regina College (translated from the Latin as "Hail Queen"). The charter specified that the college would exist "to promote virtue, and piety and learning". In 1947 the corporation received the gift of Ochre Court, a 50-room Newport mansion from businessman Robert Goelet IV, and admitted its first class of 58 students in the autumn of that year. The college's first president was Mary Matthew Doyle (1870–1960), who was also the first Mother Provincial of the Sisters of Mercy of Providence.

During the 1950s two more buildings were added to the campus: Moore Hall, originally built in 1890, was donated to the college in 1955 by Cornelius Moore, a former Newport mayor and chairman of the original board of trustees; McAuley Hall, originally the Vinland Estate, was donated to the college in 1955 by Florence Burden, daughter of Florence Adele Vanderbilt Twombly.

Salve was originally a women's college, becoming coeducational in 1973. The college added graduate programs in 1975 and, in 1991, achieved university status, transforming into Salve Regina University. The changes came about during the tenure of its longest-serving president, Lucille McKillop, who headed the institution from 1973 until 1994. During that time the school went from 1000 students studying nine majors to more than 2300 students studying 25 majors.

By 2000, the campus had expanded to 60 acres and included 18 buildings of historical significance. The university received an Historic Preservation Award in 2000 from the Rhode Island Historical Preservation and Heritage Commission for its work in the preservation and "sensitive adaptation" of the buildings and the 1999 National Preservation Award from the National Trust for Historic Preservation. In 2002 the university received a Getty Grant Program award to develop a campus heritage preservation plan.

In December 2015 the university received a Tree Campus USA designation, a program of the Arbor Day Foundation which recognizes and encourages the best practices of planting and caring for campus trees and the engagement of students in environmental stewardship. The university was accredited in 2016 by the Morton Arboretum as a Level II arboretum for its historic trees and landscapes.

== Rankings ==
For its 2023 edition, the Princeton Review selected the university as one of America’s ‘Best Colleges’. In its 2024 edition, U.S news & World Report ranked the university 27th in the Regional Universities (North) Category. In 2022, the Times Higher Education World University Rankings ranked Salve in the top 401st – 500th category of U.S. colleges. In 2022 both Architectural Digest and Conde Nast Traveler ranked the university as having one of the most beautiful college campuses in America. In 2018 Money magazine ranked the university as being one of the Most Transformative Colleges in the United States.

== Academics ==
The university offers associate, bachelor's, master's and doctoral degrees in a variety of majors. The university has three PhD programs; in international relations, the humanities, and behavior analysis. The university also offers the Doctor of Nursing Practice (DNP). The university is accredited by the New England Commission of Higher Education (NECHE) with professional accreditation for programs such as business studies, visual arts, counseling, education, nursing, and social work.

According to the university, in the three years prior to 2016, it received an average of 5,000 yearly applications, of which 3,000 students were admitted from 35 US states and 20 other countries. Salve Regina is known for its selective nursing program, but it offers more than 40 majors. There are also a number of study abroad programs.

== Buildings ==
=== Antone Academic Center ===
Named for Therese Antone, who was president from 1994 to 2009, the Antone Academic Center for Culture and the Arts houses facilities for several academic departments and programs, including art, cultural and historic preservation, English communications and media, and music, theatre and dance. It was completed in 2008 and involved combining and restoring the carriage house and stable complexes of two historic buildings — Wetmore Hall, belonging to Chateau-sur-Mer, and Mercy Hall belonging to Ochre Court.

=== McAuley Hall ===
McAuley Hall, named after Catherine McAuley, founder of the Sisters of Mercy, was originally the main building of the Vinland Estate, built in 1882 for the tobacco heiress Catharine Lorillard Wolfe. It was acquired by the university in 1955 and was at first a residence hall and library. It now houses classrooms and academic department offices.

=== McKillop Library ===
The main library is named for Lucille McKillop, who was president from 1973 to 1994. It was built in 1991 and holds approximately 150,000 volumes.

=== Miley Hall ===
Named for M. Hilda Miley, the second president, Miley Hall was built in 1964 on the former site of Mary Frick Garrett Jacobs' Whiteholme estate. It serves as a residence hall for first-year students and also houses the cafeteria, bookstore, and offices for student services.

=== Ochre Court ===
Ochre Court, built between 1890 and 1895, and once the summer residence of Ogden Goelet, is now the university's central administration building. Concerts, lectures, and special functions are held in the ballrooms on the ground floor. The Goelet family gave Ochre Court to the Sisters of Mercy in 1947, enabling the establishment of the college. It was at first the only building, and housed the dormitories for the original 58 students, classrooms, a library, and the dining hall. At the time, the faculty consisted of eight Sisters of Mercy who lived in the mansion's former servant quarters.

=== O'Hare Academic Center ===
Named for Mary James O'Hare, the university's first academic dean, the O'Hare Academic Center houses classrooms, laboratories, faculty offices, the Bazarsky Lecture Hall and the Jazzman's Cafe. Designed by East Providence architect Edward P. Denning, it was built in 1968, and in 2015 underwent a major renovation and expansion project in 2017.

=== Our Lady of Mercy Chapel ===
The chapel and interfaith prayer room are on the main floor of the building, which was completed in September 2010. It was built, in part, to house three large figurative stained glass windows and ten smaller ones by John La Farge. They were originally created in 1890–1891 for the private chapel of the Caldwell sisters in Newport. When the Caldwell house was demolished in 1931, the windows went to the Sisters of Mercy convent chapel in Fall River, Massachusetts, and were subsequently acquired by the university when the convent was torn down 2004. Wood salvaged from the Fall River convent has been incorporated into the altar base and celebrant's chair. The steeple contains three bells made by the Meneely Bell Foundry in 1910, which formerly hung in a church in Lawrence, Massachusetts. The Mercy Center for Spiritual Life is on the lower level of the building and provides space for student activities and offices for campus ministers.

=== Rodgers Recreation Center ===
Named for Thomas Rodgers Jr., a trustee and benefactor of the university, the center was completed in 2000. It houses the university's athletic and recreational facilities.

=== Gerety Hall ===
Originally known as Wakehurst, a mansion built in 1887 for James J. Van Alen, was acquired by the university from the Van Alen family in 1972. A replica of Wakehurst Place in England, Wakehurst houses classrooms and faculty offices and serves as a hub for student recreational activities and campus events. The name was changed to Gerety Hall in May 2019 after the retirement of president Jane Gerety.

=== Young Building ===
Named for the university benefactors Anita O'Keeffe and Robert R. Young, the Young Building is the home of the Pell Center for International Relations and Public Policy and is also a residence for sophomore students in the Pell Honors Program. It was originally Fairlawn, a mansion built in the 1850s for the Boston lawyer Andrew Ritchie and later owned by Levi P. Morton. It was acquired by the university in 1997.

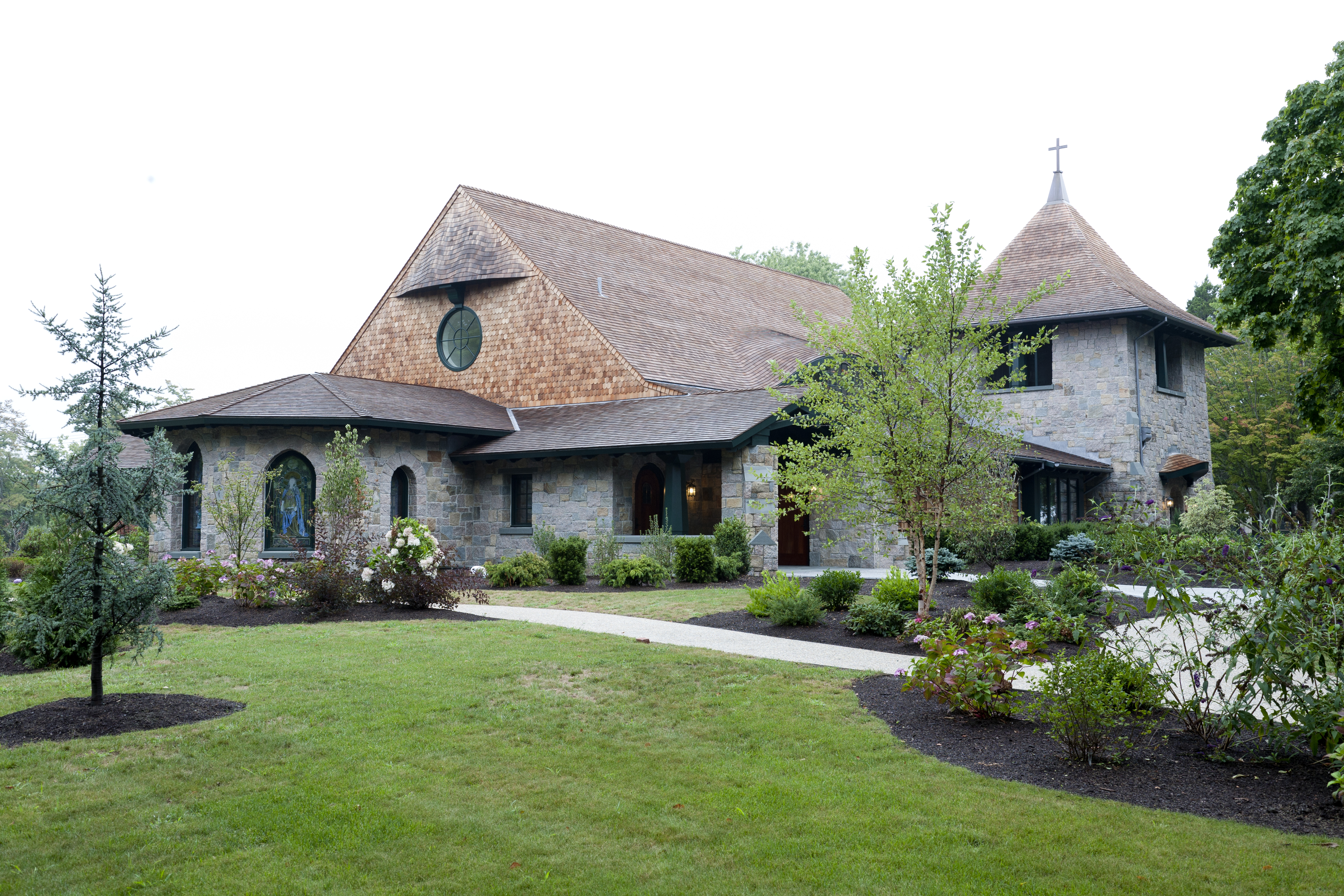
Our Lady of Mercy Chapel

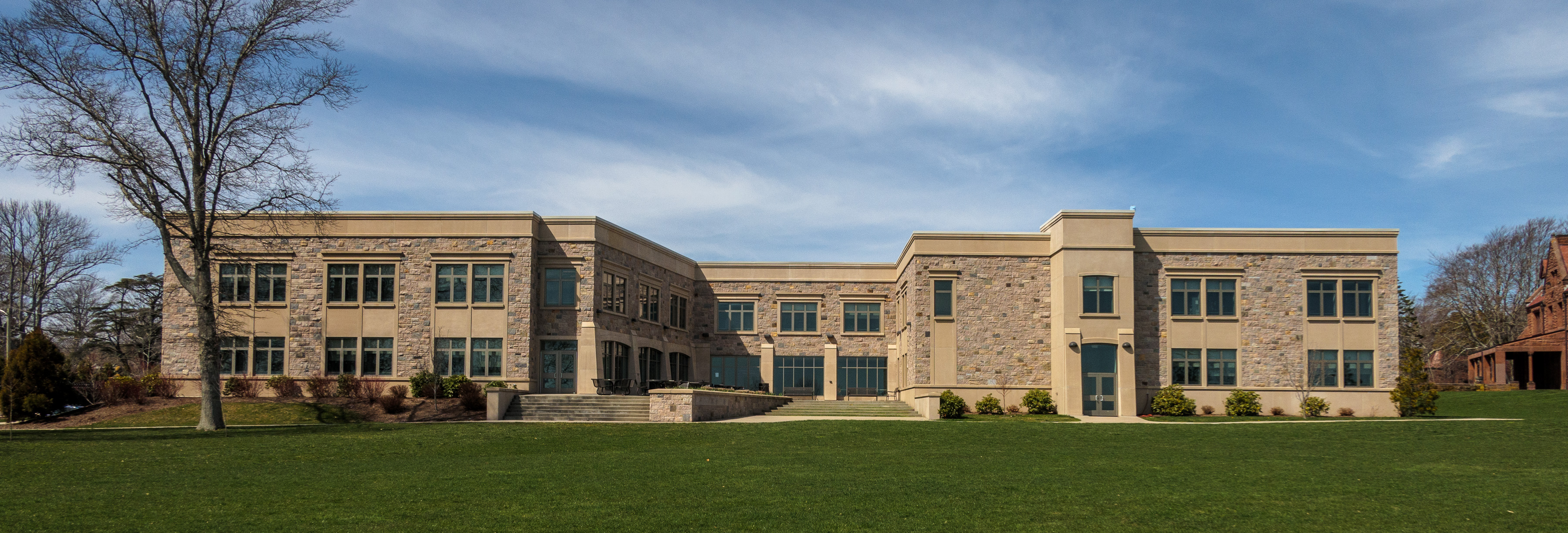
O'Hare Academic Center

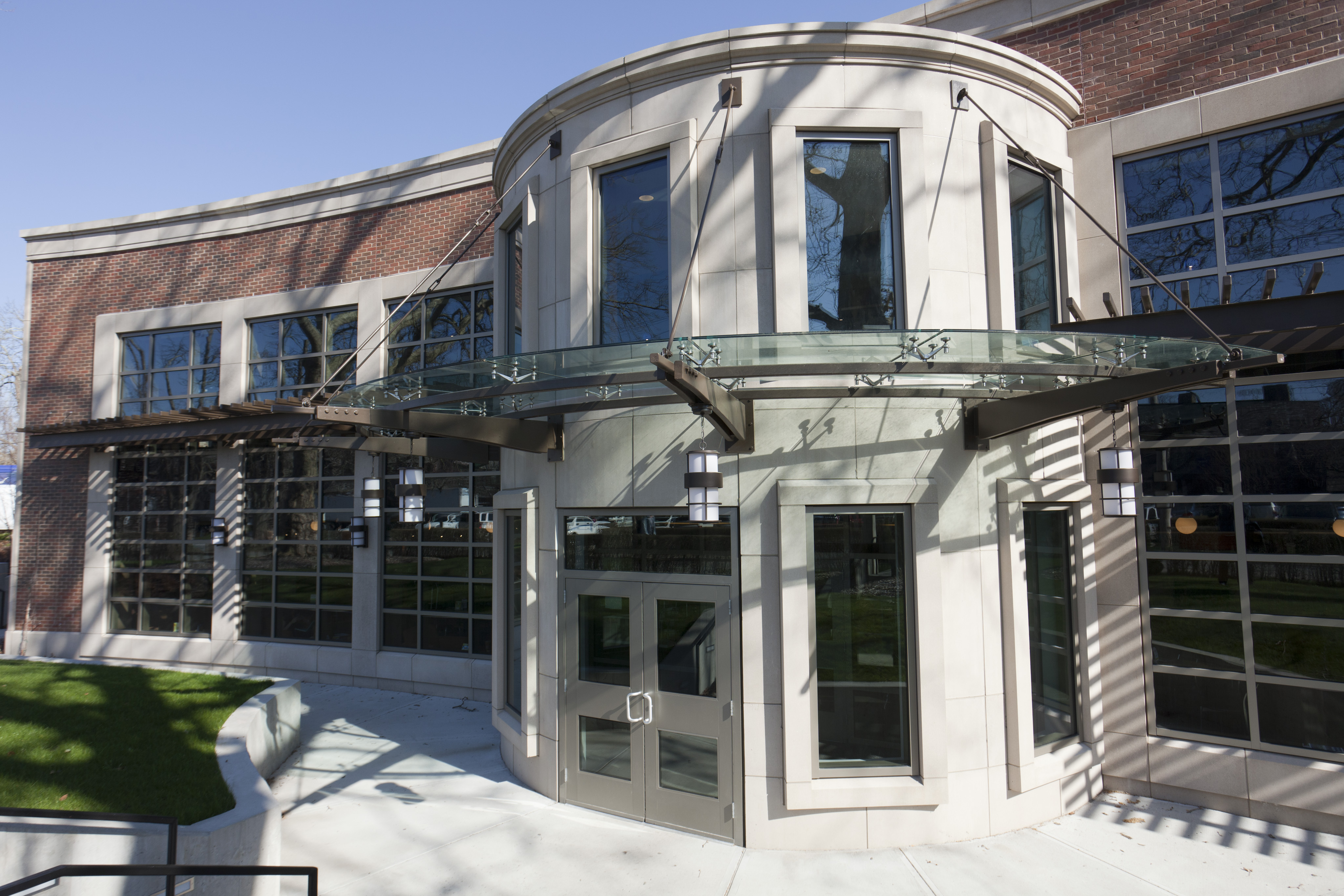
Miley Hall

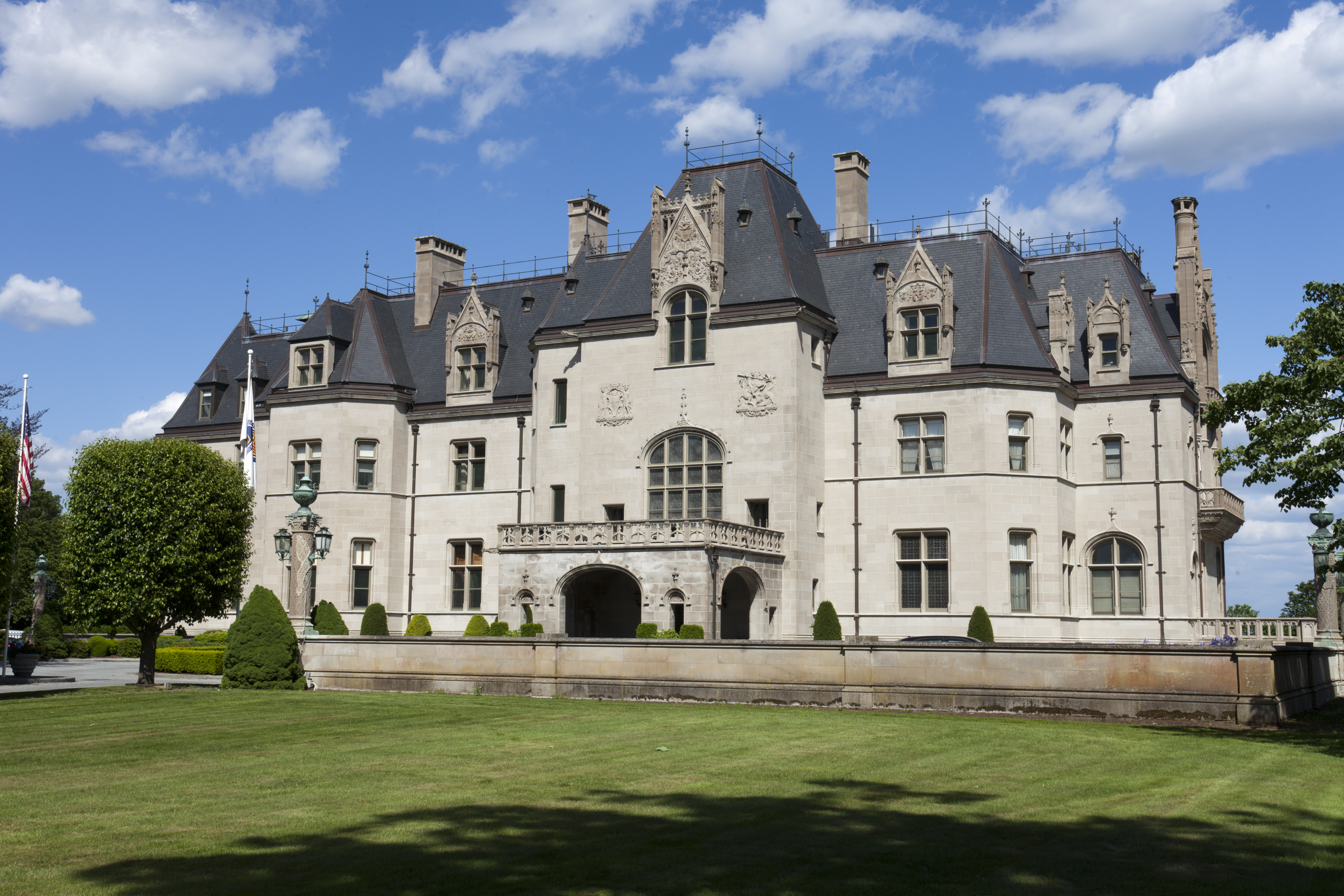
Ochre Court

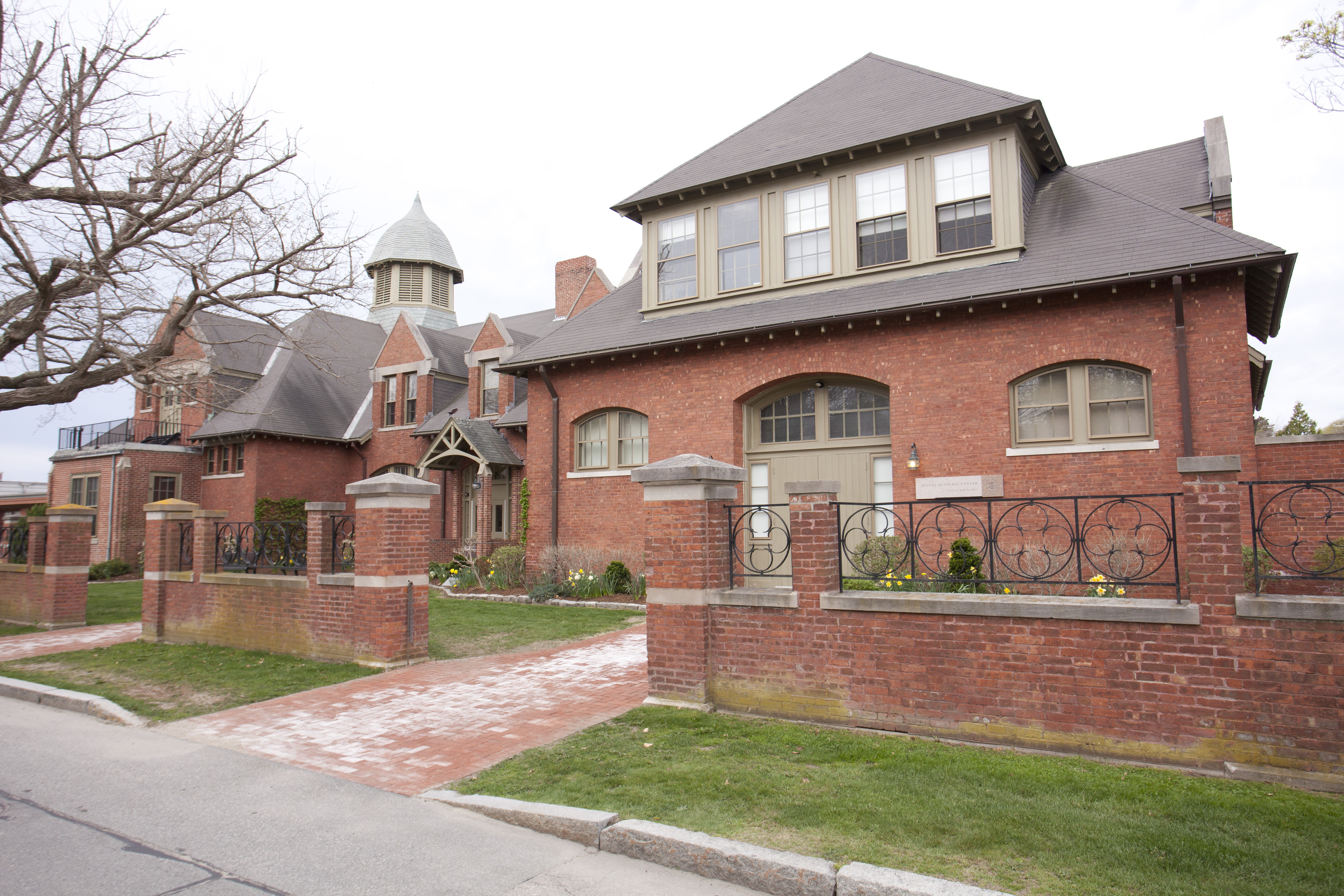
Antone Academic Center

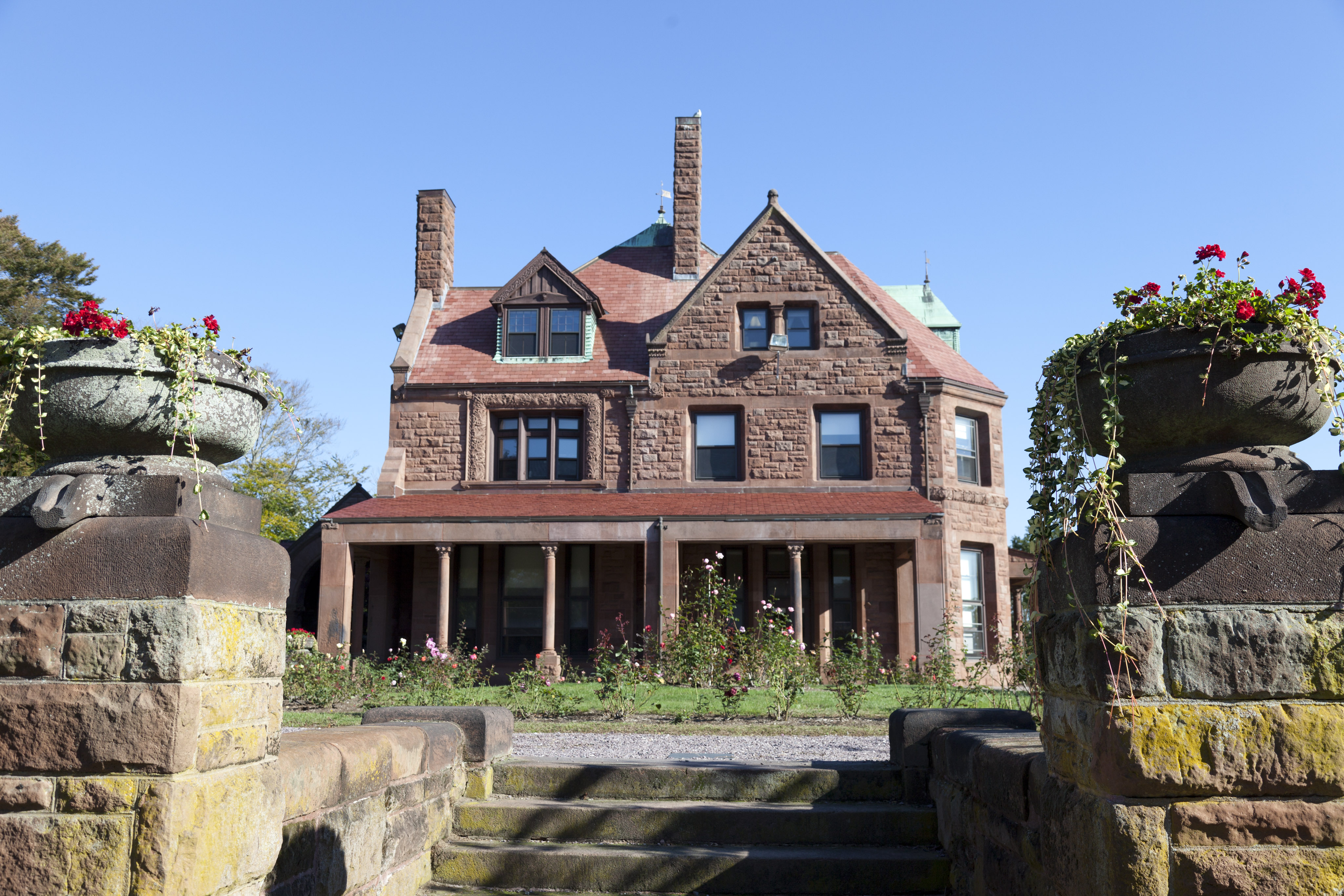
McAuley Hall

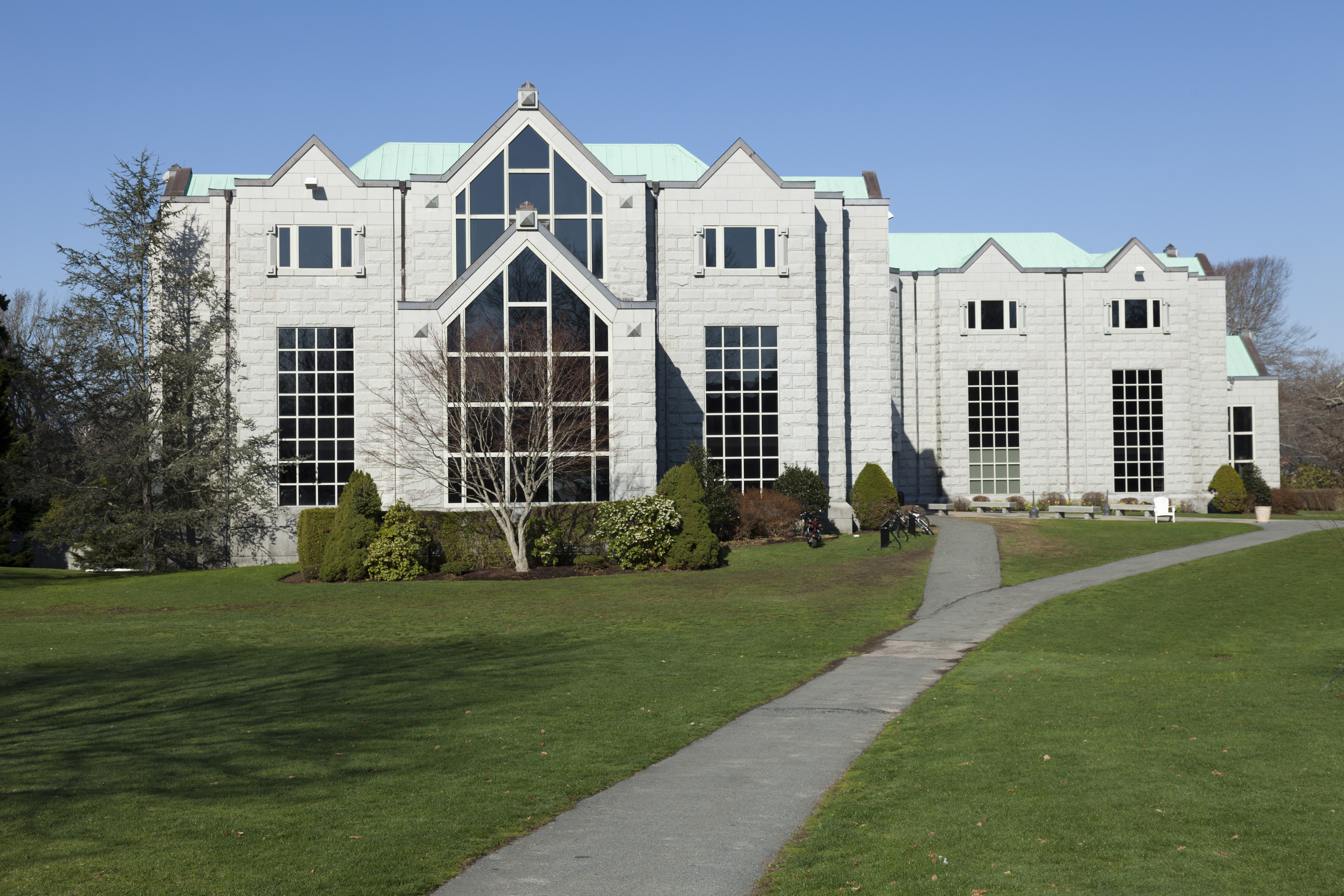
McKillop Library

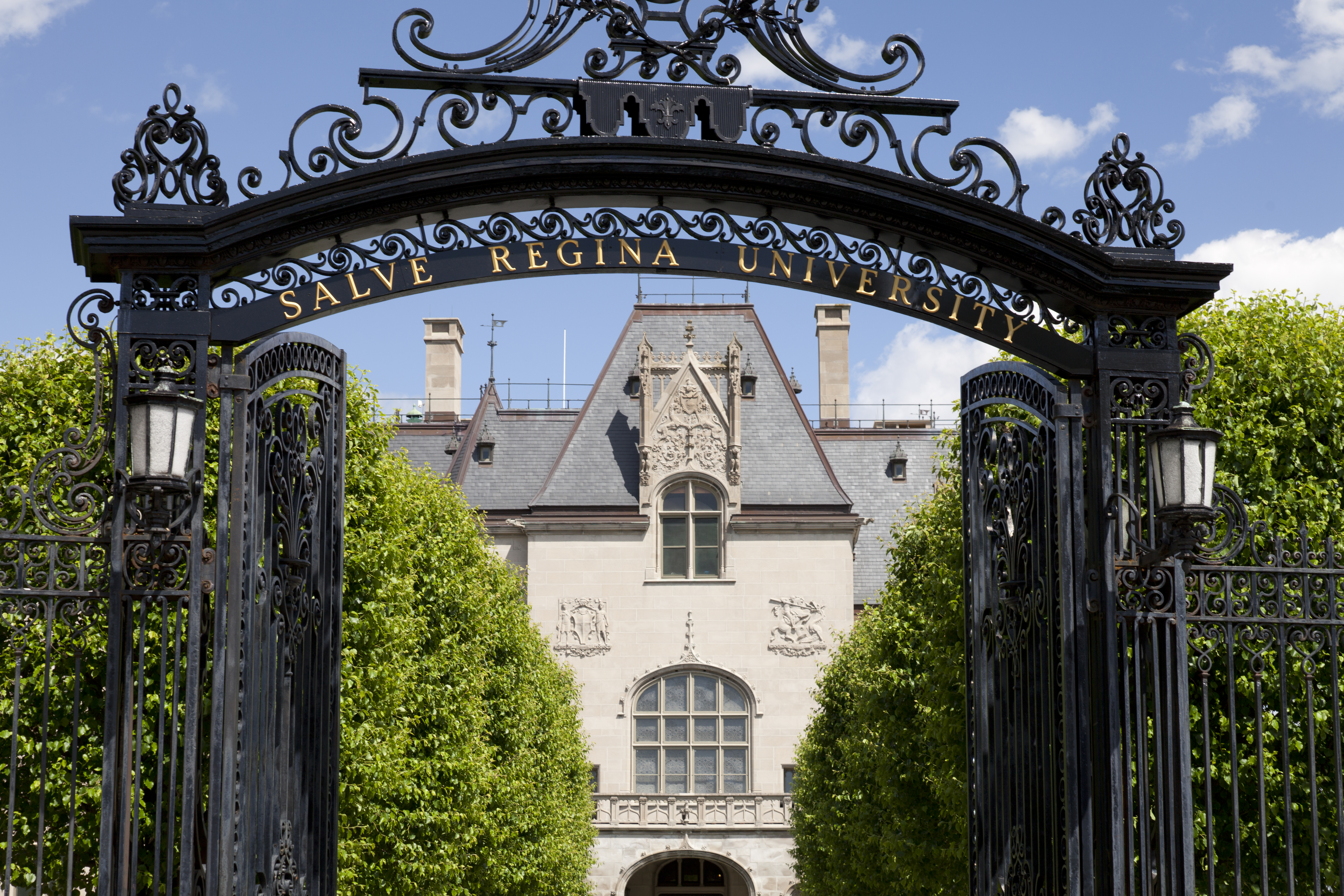
Entrance to Ochre Court, Salve Regina's first building

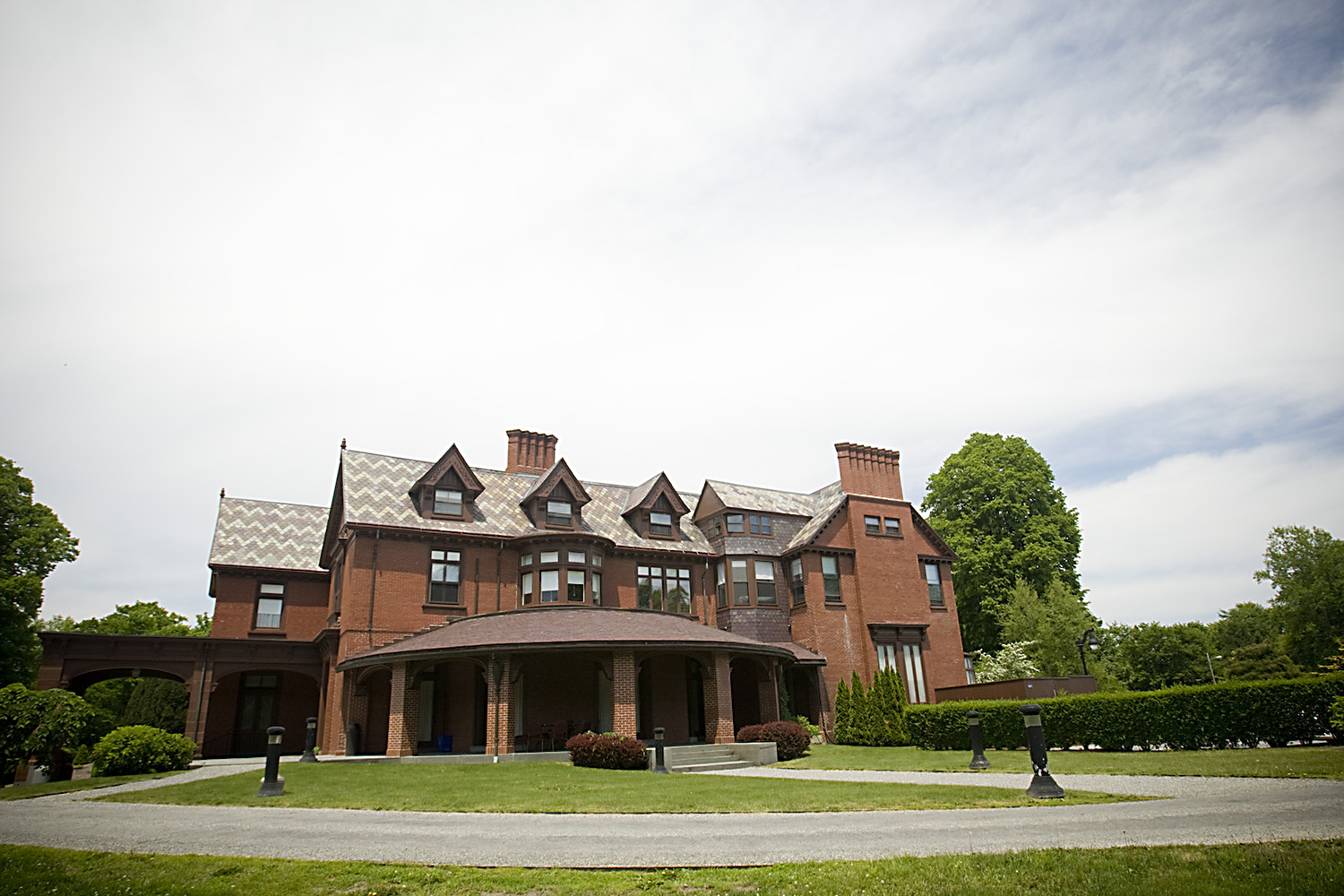
Young Building

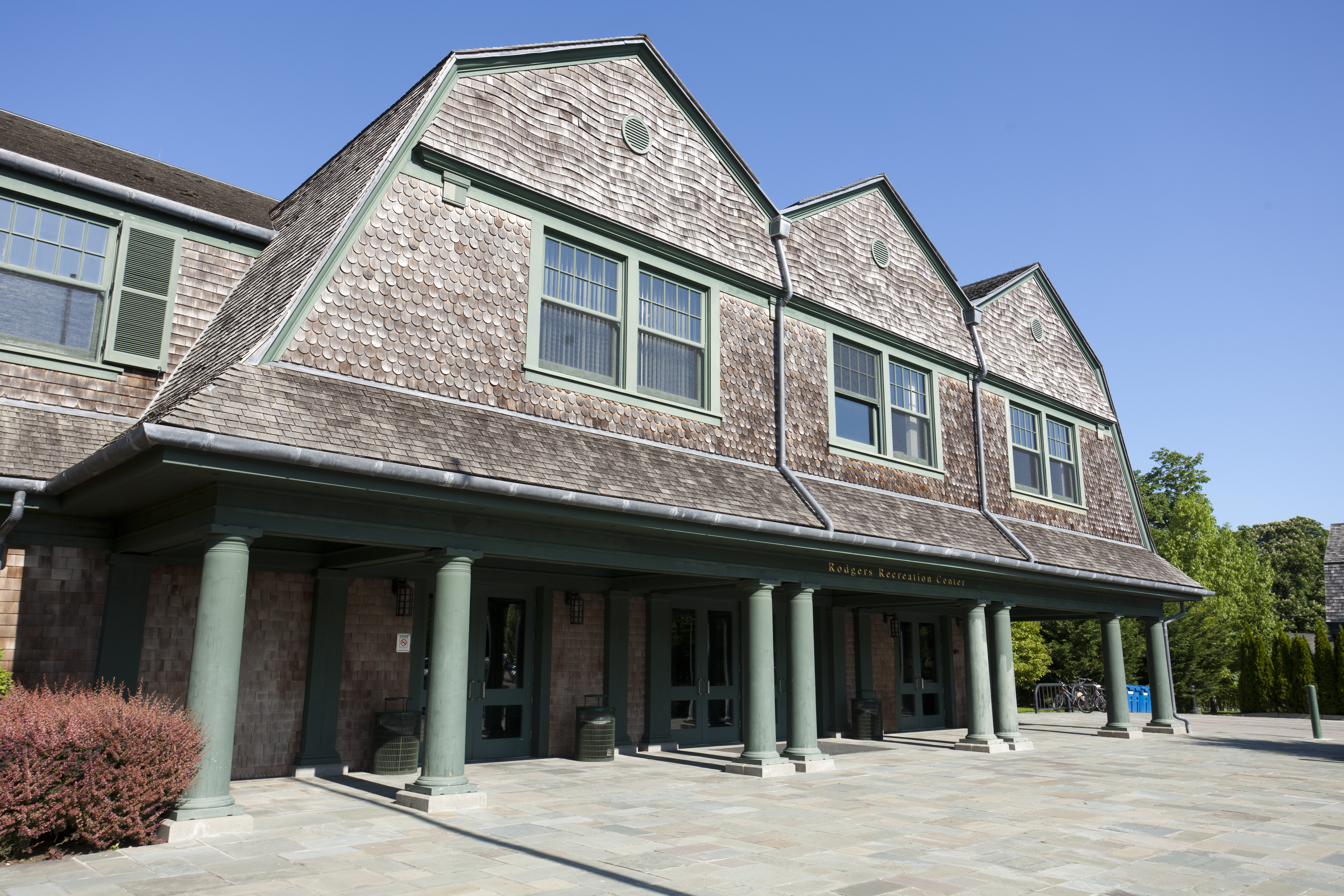
Rodgers Recreation Center

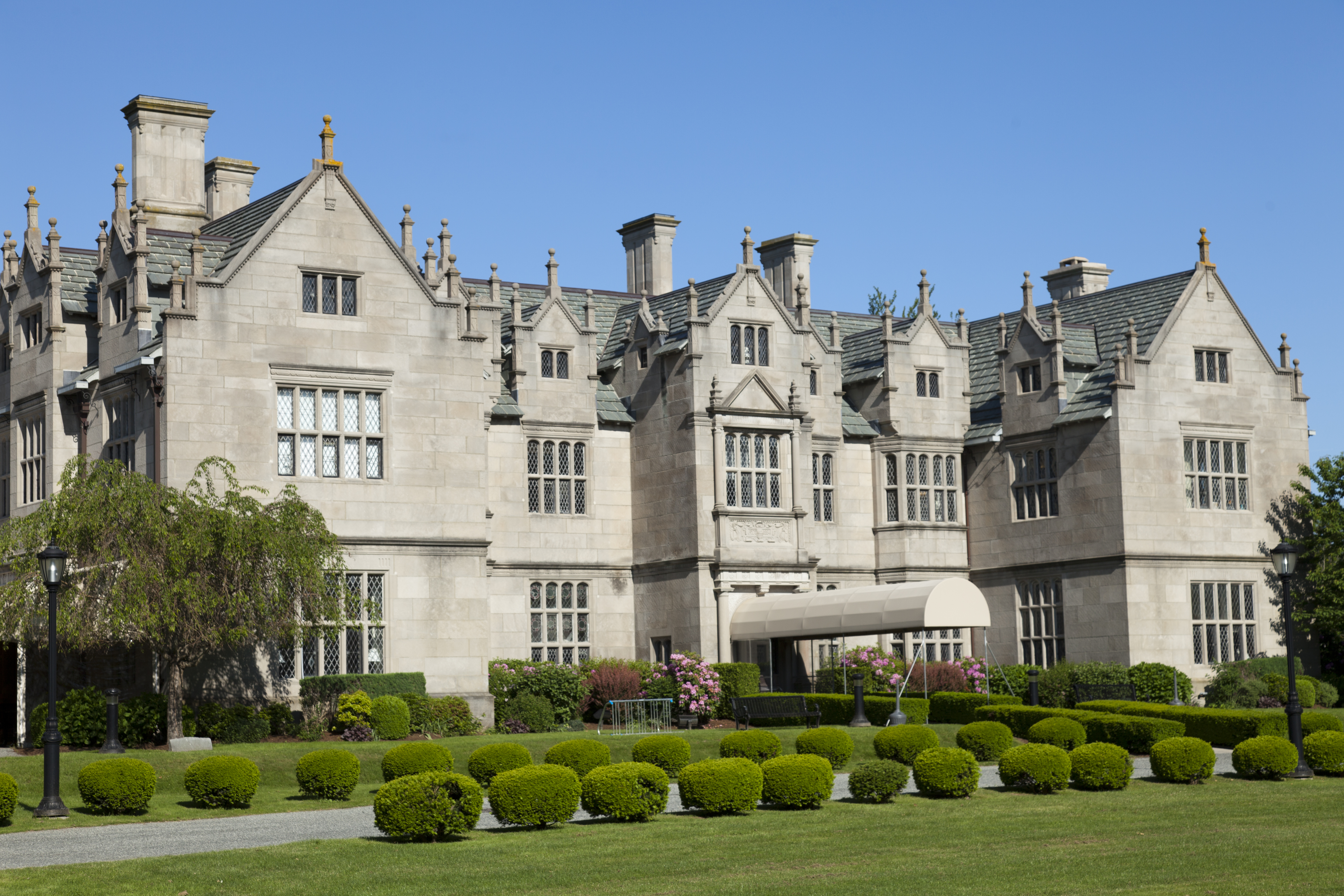
Wakehurst Student Center

== Athletics ==
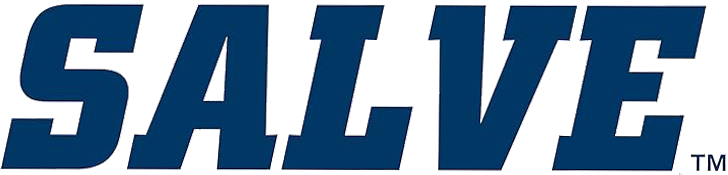
Salve athletics wordmark

The university competes in Division III of the National Collegiate Athletic Association. It is a member of the NEWMAC and its quasi-independent football arm, Commonwealth Coast Football, and offers ten sports for women (soccer, field hockey, tennis, cross country, basketball, ice hockey, volleyball, softball, track and field, and lacrosse), eight for men (football, cross country, soccer, basketball, ice hockey, tennis, baseball, and lacrosse), and one co-ed sport (sailing).

It also has a club sports program. The men's and women's rugby clubs compete in the Colonial Coast Rugby Conference.

== Alumni ==
=== Arts ===
- Kristin Hersh, musician
- Betty Hutton, actress

=== Business ===
- Janet L. Robinson, publishing executive

=== Military ===
- Barry Black, rear admiral
- Peter W. Chiarelli, general
- Louis Iasiello, rear admiral
- James J. Lovelace, lieutenant general
- Stanley A. McChrystal, general
- Michael Noonan, vice admiral
- James W. Nuttall, major general
- Robert J. Papp Jr., admiral
- Arnold Resnicoff
- Ronald G. Richard, major general
- Martin R. Steele, lieutenant general
- Joseph D. Stewart, vice admiral
- Antonio M. Taguba, major general
- George J. Trautman III, lieutenant general
- Stephen A. Turcotte, rear admiral
- Frances C. Wilson, lieutenant general
- Issah Adam Yakubu, rear admiral
- Anthony Zinni, general

=== Politics and law ===
- Karen Carroll, justice
- Elizabeth Morancy, Rhode Island State Representative
- Kate Sanchez, California State Assemblymember

== See also ==
- Story in the Public Square
- List of current and historical women's universities and colleges in the United States
- List of Roman Catholic universities and colleges in the United States
- Seaview Terrace (aka Carey Mansion)
