= Story in the Public Square =

Tell stories of interest to the public discourse

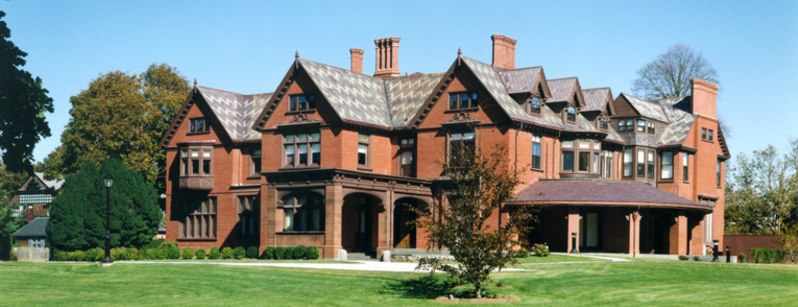
Young Building, Salve Regina University, Newport, R.I., home of Story in the Public Square

Story in the Public Square is an initiative to study, celebrate and tell stories of interest to the public discourse. It is based at Salve Regina University's Pell Center for International Relations and Public Policy, and it has received support from the Rhode Island Council for the Humanities, the Pulitzer Prize Board, and other sources.

== Premise ==
Story in the Public Square's guiding premise is that however they are communicated — through text, images, art, music or other means — stories have a unique ability to influence opinions and beliefs that is beyond the cold, hard facts of exposition. Story in the Public Square sponsors seminars, conferences and lectures; supports original scholarship about public storytelling; annually names a local and national story of the year; and annually awards the Pell Center Prize for Story in the Public Square, which recognizes a contemporary storyteller whose work has had a significant impact on the public dialogue.

In the fall of 2014, SIPS sponsored performances of 'Ajax: A Community Conversation About Returning Veterans,' a play about the struggles of veterans after war produced by Providence College Professor and SIPS fellow Robert B. Hackey.

Story in the Public Square was founded in 2012 by Pell Center executive director Jim Ludes and author, journalist and filmmaker G. Wayne Miller, now Story in the Public Square Director.

On February 12, 2016, Story in the Public Square announced a partnership with the national PBS show White House Chronicle to produce monthly episodes of "Story in the Public Square" which "will feature interviews with today’s best print, screen, music and other storytellers about their creative process and how their stories impact public understanding and policy." The first broadcast, was the weekend of February 13, 2016.

On March 15, 2016, SIPS announced the fourth annual winner of the Pell Center Prize for Story in the Public Square: Pulitzer Prize-winning photographer and documentary filmmaker Javier Manzano, who received the award in a ceremony on June 21, 2016, at the Pell Center.

In accepting the award, Manzano spoke of why he risks his personal safety while working inside Syria, Afghanistan and other war-torn places. "The motivation is to see the courage and to see the resilience and to see the dignity that some of the people that have gone through hell on earth, still can look you in the eye and want you to tell their story. Even though they know that they are not going to gain anything out of it and most likely none of their entire family, or clan or neighborhood, or city or country. But they still want to tell you their story. You still have to tell their story."

On January 14, 2017, Story in the Public Square launched a new weekly PBS and SiriusXM Radio show. The first guest was national security analyst Tom Nichols, professor of National Security Affairs at the Naval War College, who discussed Russian interference in the 2016 U.S. presidential election and the "death of expertise" in an era of fake news.

On August 21, 2018, it was announced that Story in the Public Square TV, which has won multiple Telly Awards, would be broadcast in markets across the U.S., including New York, Los Angeles, Chicago, Houston, San Francisco, Atlanta, Boston, Phoenix, Detroit, San Diego, Milwaukee, Tampa, New Orleans, Pittsburgh, Memphis, St. Louis, Portland, Oregon, and Birmingham, Alabama. As of August 18, 2022, the show is carried in 23 of the top 25 markets in America, and 83 of the top 100, with a national reach of 85%.

On May 21, 2019, it was announced that the show won its second Telly Award in the Best Political/Commentary in the Television category.

On May 25, 2022, it was announced that the show won its sixth Telly Award for Social Impact in the Television category.

== Pell Center Prize for Story in the Public Square ==
Year	Winner	Cited Works
2025	Dr. Ned Blackhawk	Author, teacher
2023	Azar Nafisi	Author, teacher
2021	Michael Paul Williams	Pulitzer Prize-winning writer for the Richmond Times-Dispatch
2020	Due to the coronavirus pandemic, there was no Pell Prize awarded in 2020.	
2019	Elizabeth Kolbert	Pulitzer Prize-winning writer for The New Yorker
2018	Dan Barry	Pulitzer Prize-winning journalist
2017	Daphne Matziaraki	Documentary filmmaker, nominated for Best Documentary Short Subject, 2017 Academy Awards Daphne Matziaraki#cite note-4
2016	Javier Manzano	Photographer and documentary filmmaker, winner of the 2013 Pulitzer Prize for Feature Photography
2015	Lisa Genova	Still Alice, Inside The O'Briens, Left Neglected and Love Anthony.
2014	Danny Strong	Recount, Game Change and Lee Daniels' The Butler.
2013	Dana Priest	A series of Washington Post stories "exposing mistreatment of wounded veterans at Walter Reed Hospital, evoking a national outcry and producing reforms by federal officials," according to the 2008 Pulitzer Prize jury.

== See also ==
- Pell Center for International Relations and Public Policy
