= Pell Center for International Relations and Public Policy =

Research center in Salve Regina University in Newport, Rhode Island, USA

Coordinates: 41.4677484°N 71.3058355°W

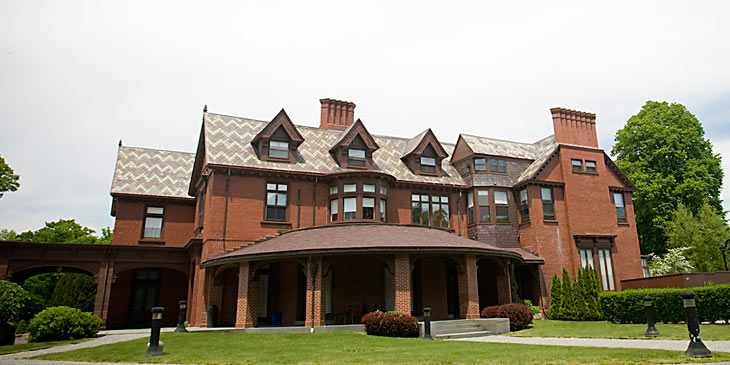
The Pell Center for International Relations and Public Policy building

The Pell Center for International Relations and Public Policy at Salve Regina University is a research center devoted to the exploration and study of politics, international relations, public policies and ideas. Dedicated to the legacy of the late Sen. Claiborne Pell, a Newport, Rhode Island resident during his 36 years in the U.S. Senate, the center promotes American engagement in the world, effective government at home, and civic participation by all Americans.

The Pell Center is home to the Story in the Public Square initiative.

== Story in the Public Square ==
Since 2013 (with the exception of the pandemic year of 2020), the Center has annually awarded the Pell Center Prize for Story in the Public Square.

== See also ==
- Story in the Public Square
