= Lillian Barrett =

American writer

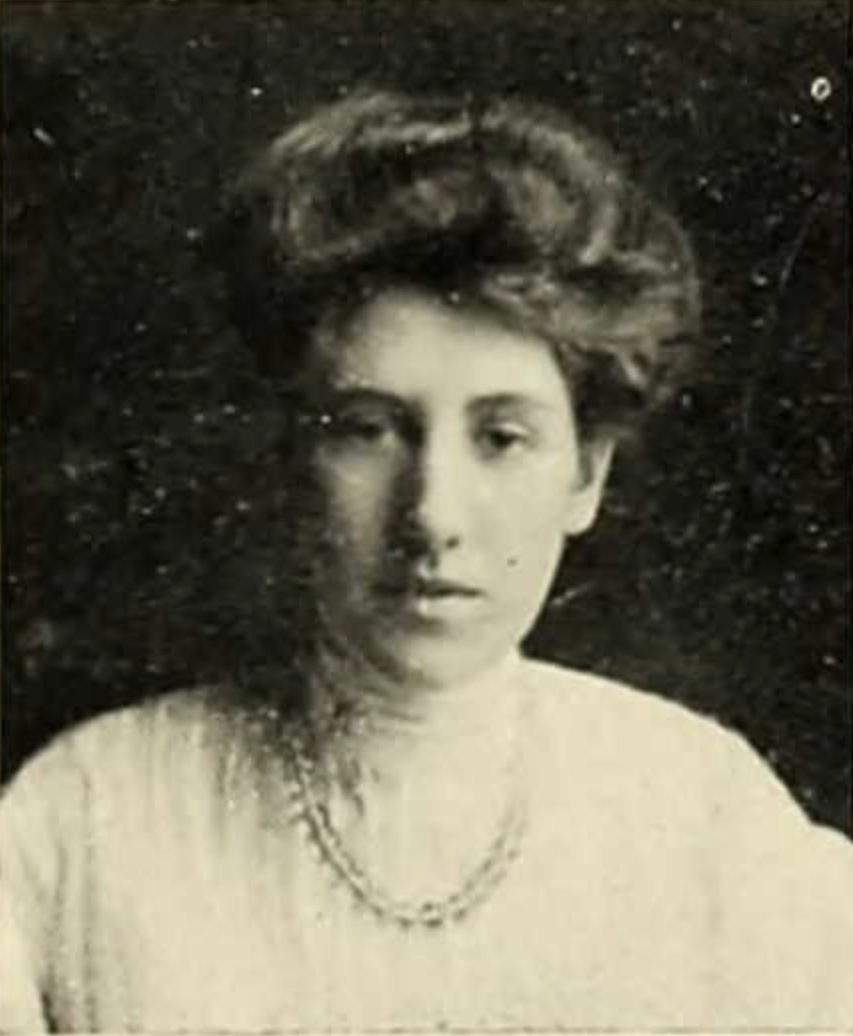
Lillian Barrett in 1906.

Lillian Barrett, also known as Lillian Foster Barrett, (13 June 1884 – 27 April 1963) was an American writer whose output included novels, plays, short stories, and articles for magazines. Her 1921 novel Gibbeted Gods was adapted by Barrett into the play The Dice of the Gods which was staged on Broadway in 1922. Aside from her years studying at Smith College, she lived her life in Newport, Rhode Island.

== Life and career ==
The daughter of Joseph Barrett and Brianna Barrett (née Thompson), Lillian Foster Barrett was born on 13 June 1884 in Newport, Rhode Island. (Note: Barrett's obituary states that she was born in Middletown, Rhode Island on 13 June 1884. However, while the date of birth from the obituary is the same as in other documents, the place of birth is different and is most likely inaccurate. Multiple sources state that Lillian Barrett was born in Newport, Rhode Island and not in Middletown, including a state census record, her passport application with the Federal government of the United States, and her biographical entry in Who's Who in America.) Her father worked as the superintendent of the Newport Casino for forty-two years. She attended Rogers High School in her native city, and graduated from that school in 1902. She then studied at Smith College where she earned a bachelor's degree in 1906.

Barrett began writing for magazines in 1915; working initially as a regular contributor to The Smart Set with her work for that publication encompassing both novelettes and short stories. She went on to write for a variety of other magazines including Harper's Magazine, Harper's Bazaar, and The American Mercury. Her first novel, The Sinister Revel, was published in 1919 by Alfred A. Knopf. This was followed by the novels Gibbeted Gods (1921) and The Crowd Out Front (1927).

Barrett's brother Richmond Brooks Barrett was also a writer, and together the sister and brother co-authored the plays The Hobby Horse, Birds of Passage, and The Fledgling. Alone, she adapted her novel Gibbeted Gods into the play The Dice of the Gods. It was staged at the Cort Theatre in Chicago in 1922 in a production starring Minnie Maddern Fiske. The play then toured; ultimately debuting on Broadway at the National Theatre on April 5, 1923. From 1927 to 1934 she worked as the executive secretary of the Casino Theatre Company in Newport.

Barret never married and was an active member of Trinity Church in her native city. She died at the age of 78 on 27 April 1963. She is buried at Island Cemetery.
