= Vinti =

Vinti may refer to:

- Vinti Idnani (born 1991), Indian actress
- John P. Vinti (1907–1990), American theoretical physicist
- Natalie Vinti (born 1988), Mexican-American soccer player
- I Vinti, 1953 Italian film
- Vinti Prize, Italian mathematics award
