= Rogers High School (Rhode Island) =

Public high school in Newport, Rhode Island

Location
- Newport, Rhode Island; United States; 41°28′6.16″N 71°19′18.34″W

Information
- Type: Public high school
- Established: 1873
- School district: Newport Public Schools
- Principal: Michael Monahan
- Teaching staff: 58.00 (FTE)
- Grades: 9–12
- Enrollment: 599 (2024-25)
- Student to teacher ratio: 10.33
- Colors: Red and black
- Mascot: Vikings
- Rival: Middletown High School
- Accreditation: New England Association of Schools and Colleges
- Website: https://www.npsri.net/o/rhs
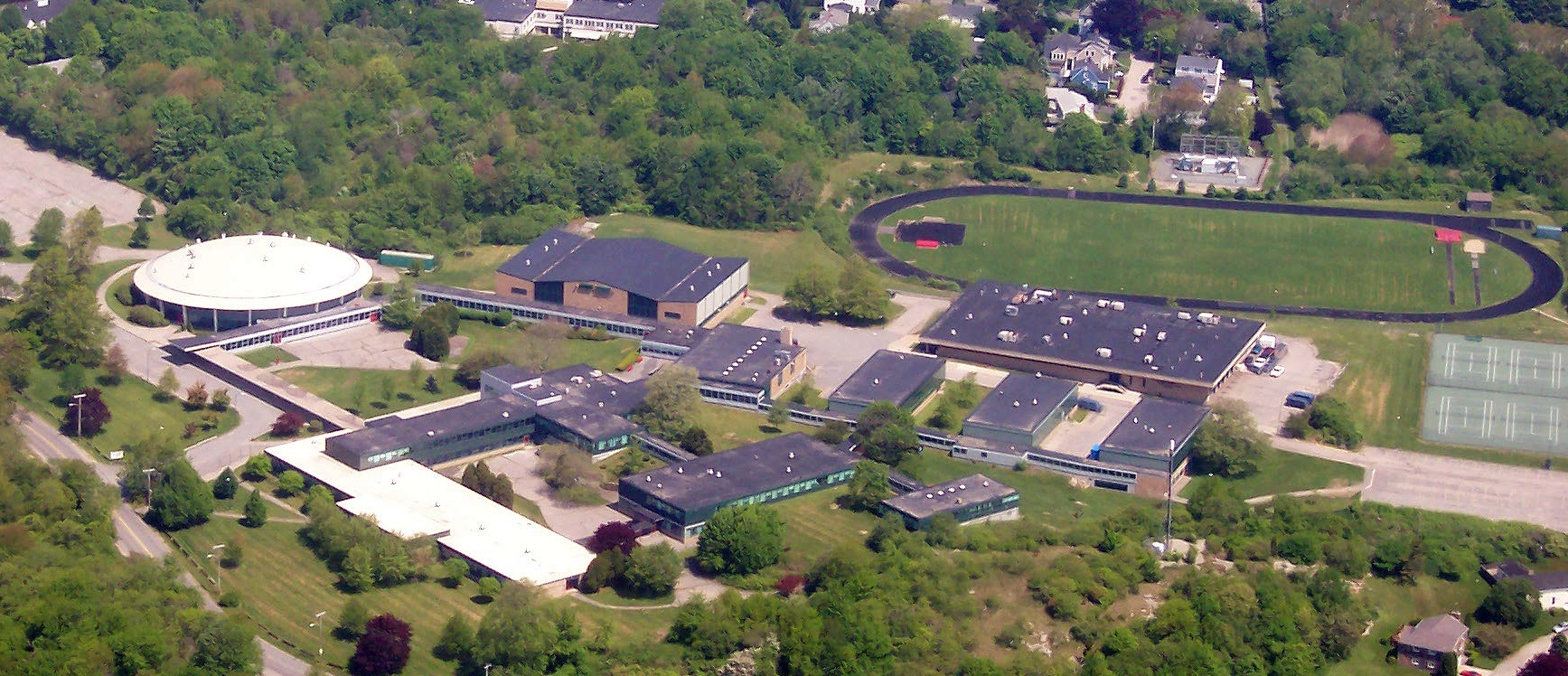

William S. Rogers High School is a public high school in Newport, Rhode Island, United States. It is part of Newport Public Schools. Other public high schools in the area include the Paul Crowley MET School and the Career & Technical School.

== History ==
The school was founded by educator William Sanford Rogers in 1873 and was named for him. The original Rogers High School building was on Church Street. The school moved to a building on Broadway in 1905, and the old building became the Thayer School and later a Boys and Girls Club. In 1957, the school moved to its current location on Wickham Road, and the old Broadway building became the location for Thompson Middle School. An expansion to the school, the Newport Area Career and Technical Center, was completed in 1968. On November 24, 2025, two African American teenagers who played football at the school were charged with assaulting a 16 year old student with a mental disability in the football locker room.

== Extracurricular ==
The school's newspaper, The Red and Black, was first published in 1920, but ceased regular publication in the early 2000s.

The school began their football program in 1890 and their basketball program in 1905.

The school has the second oldest JROTC program in the country, founded in 1916. It holds the Honor Unit With Distinction rank, the highest unit rank possible.

== School song ==
"Fair Rogers" is sung at every commencement ceremony. Words by Harold B. Walcott, music by H. S. Hendy.

Fair Rogers! Rogers Fair! Thy name...
Shall ever stand for holy fame...
From childhood's day we've looked to thee...
As up to some great deity.

Chorus:

O sing! Ye sons of Rogers! sing...
Loud let your rolling anthems ring...
And royal praise to Rogers bring...
Throughout our city fair.

== Alumni ==
- Edwin T. Banning, architect
- Lillian Barrett, novelist and playwright; graduated in 1902
- John Howard Benson, calligrapher and stone carver
- Bebe Buell, singer and model
- William T. Bull, college football coach
- Frank Corridon, Major League Baseball pitcher (1904–1910)
- The Cowsills, 1960s singing act
- Tanya Donelly, co-founder and guitarist of the band Throwing Muses, lead vocalist of the band Belly, and guitarist for The Breeders
- Susan Braley Franklin, American classical scholar and educator
- Joanna Going, actress
- Paul Gordon, keyboardist and guitarist with The B-52's and New Radicals
- Kristin Hersh, co-founder, vocalist, and guitarist of the band Throwing Muses
- P. H. Horgan III, PGA Tour player
- Van Johnson, actor
- William Stevens Lawton, graduated from Rogers in 1917, attained the rank of lieutenant general in the United States Army
- Dorothy McCullough Lee, former mayor of Portland, Oregon (1949–1953)
- John Mellekas, professional football player
- Tara McGowan, American political strategist
- Florence K. Murray, former Rhode Island State Senator (1949–1956), first female state senator in Rhode Island, 1st first female judge in Rhode Island, first female member of the Rhode Island Supreme Court, and recipient of the Legion of Merit; namesake of Murray Judicial Complex
- David Narcizo, drummer for the band Throwing Muses
- M. Teresa Paiva-Weed, former president of the Rhode Island Senate (2009–2017)
- Arthur Rosson, film director
- John P. Vinti, theoretical physicist
- Josephine Silone Yates, first black student at Rogers High School; first black woman to head a college science department
