= Newport School District =

Newport School District may refer to:

- Newport School District (Arkansas)
- Newport School District (Pennsylvania)
- Newport School District (Washington)
- Newport Public Schools in Rhode Island
