= Middletown Public Schools (Rhode Island) =

School district in Rhode Island, United States

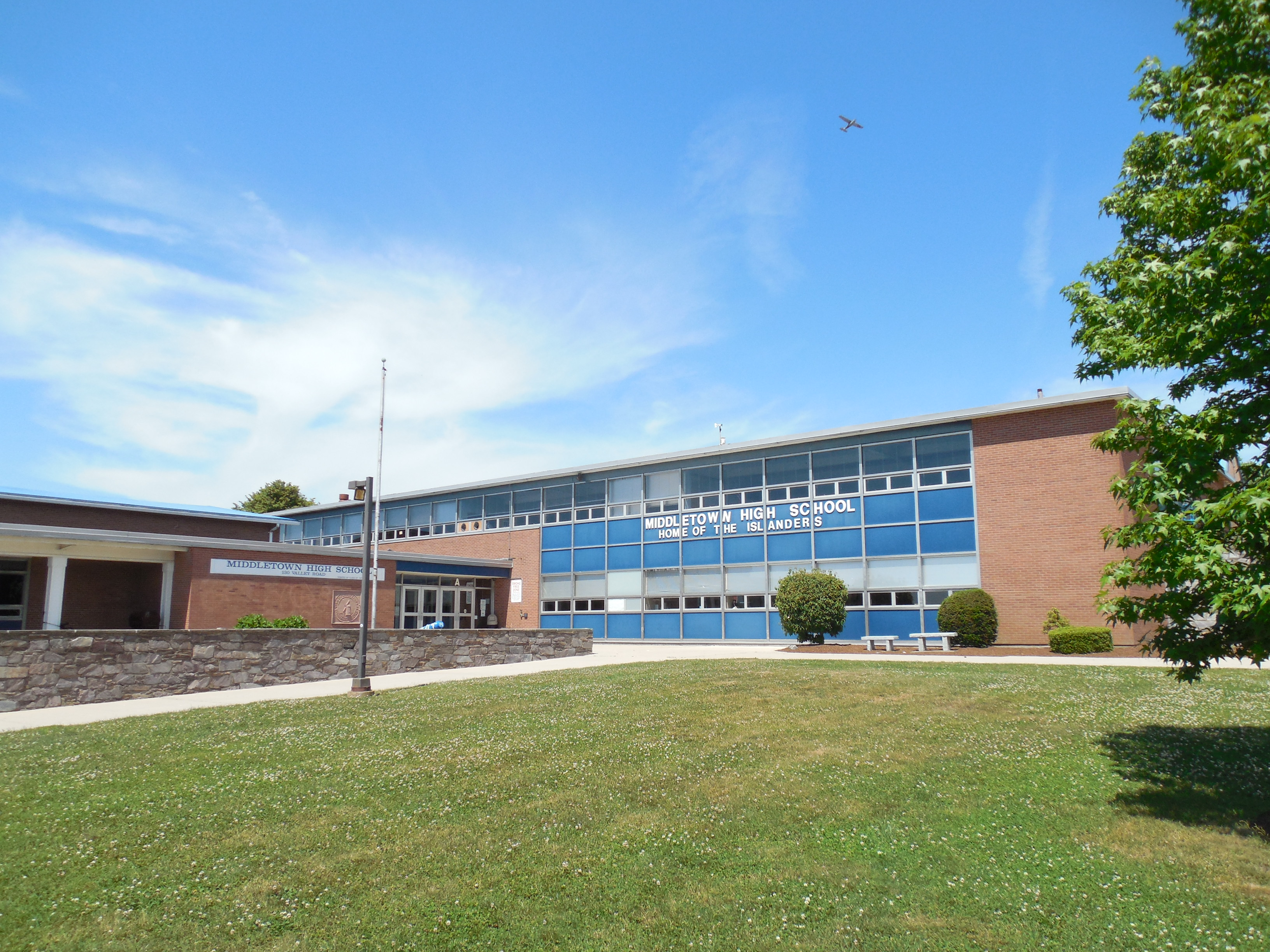
Middletown High School

Middletown Public Schools is a school district in Middletown, Rhode Island.

== Schools ==
- Middletown High School
- J. H. Gaudet Middle School (grades 5–8)
- J. H. Gaudet Learning Academy (grade 4), located at Gaudet Middle

Grades PK-3:

- Aquidneck Elementary School
- Forest Avenue Elementary School

In 2009, in consideration of a decline in enrollment and a reduced budget, the school district closed John F. Kennedy Elementary School. As of 2014, Newport Public Schools sends preschool students to leased classrooms at Kennedy due to overpopulation at Claiborne Pell School in Newport. As of 2018, Middletown Schools plans to reoccupy the building, so the arrangement with Newport will expire in 2021. In addition, John F. Kennedy Head Start operates out of the facility.
