= Newport Public Schools =

School district in Rhode Island, United States

Location
- Newport, Rhode Island, United States

District information
- Type: Public school district
- Schools: Claiborne Pell School; Frank E. Thompson Middle School; Rogers High School

Newport Public Schools (NPS) is the public school system of Newport, Rhode Island.

== History ==
NPS hired Jack Ambrogi as superintendent in 2005 and Colleen Jermain as superintendent in January 2014.

== Schools ==
Its schools are Claiborne Pell School, Frank E. Thompson Middle School, and Rogers High School. Preschool students go to leased classrooms at John F. Kennedy Elementary School, a Middletown Public Schools facility in Middletown. The Middletown arrangement is scheduled to expire in 2021.

Pell, named after U.S. Senator Claiborne Pell, opened in August 2013 as a consolidation of previous elementary schools. Pell, constructed on the former Sullivan school site, serves all areas of Newport, allowing for all families to have access to the same facilities and services at the elementary level. The building has a capacity of 842 students. A bond worth $30 million to build a new consolidated elementary school was approved by voters in November 2010. The Rhode Island Department of Education only funded the amount of space that the school was projected to have; it added an additional two classrooms after a request from Newport authorities. Pell had 890 students when it first opened, and As of 2018 Pell is overcrowded as it had 950 students. By 2014 NPS sought to lease classrooms at JFK School to relieve overcrowding at Pell. The enrollment levels were higher than expected as a previous economic recessions around 2008 made private school unaffordable for area residents, because the Catholic school in Newport, St. Joseph of Cluny School, closed in 2017, and because parents were interested in Pell's new facilities. Pell has two playgrounds.

In 2018 Linda Borg of the Providence Journal wrote that "Newport had successfully rebuilt the aging Thompson Middle School, which was hailed as a success."

=== Defunct schools ===
There were previously multiple elementary schools, with seven in operation as of 1997, and six in operation in the mid-2000s. The relatively small schools remained in operation even though the city is only 7.7 square miles (20 km^{2}) large; members of the Newport community wished to keep them open as they wanted their children to be in walking distance of their elementary schools. The schools served different socioeconomic groups as their service areas were different. By the 2000s the enrollment levels had declined. In addition, all of the elementary schools needed maintenance; three had been originally built in the late 1800s. Some students traveled by school bus to other elementary schools because special education services were only offered at certain schools and so the schools could have better socioeconomic and/or racial balances.

The idea of a school merger was brought up in 2005 after the district experienced a budget shortfall. Ambrogi closed two schools after he became superintendent in 2005; he received death threats afterwards. In 2013 the remaining elementary schools were consolidated.

==== List of defunct schools ====
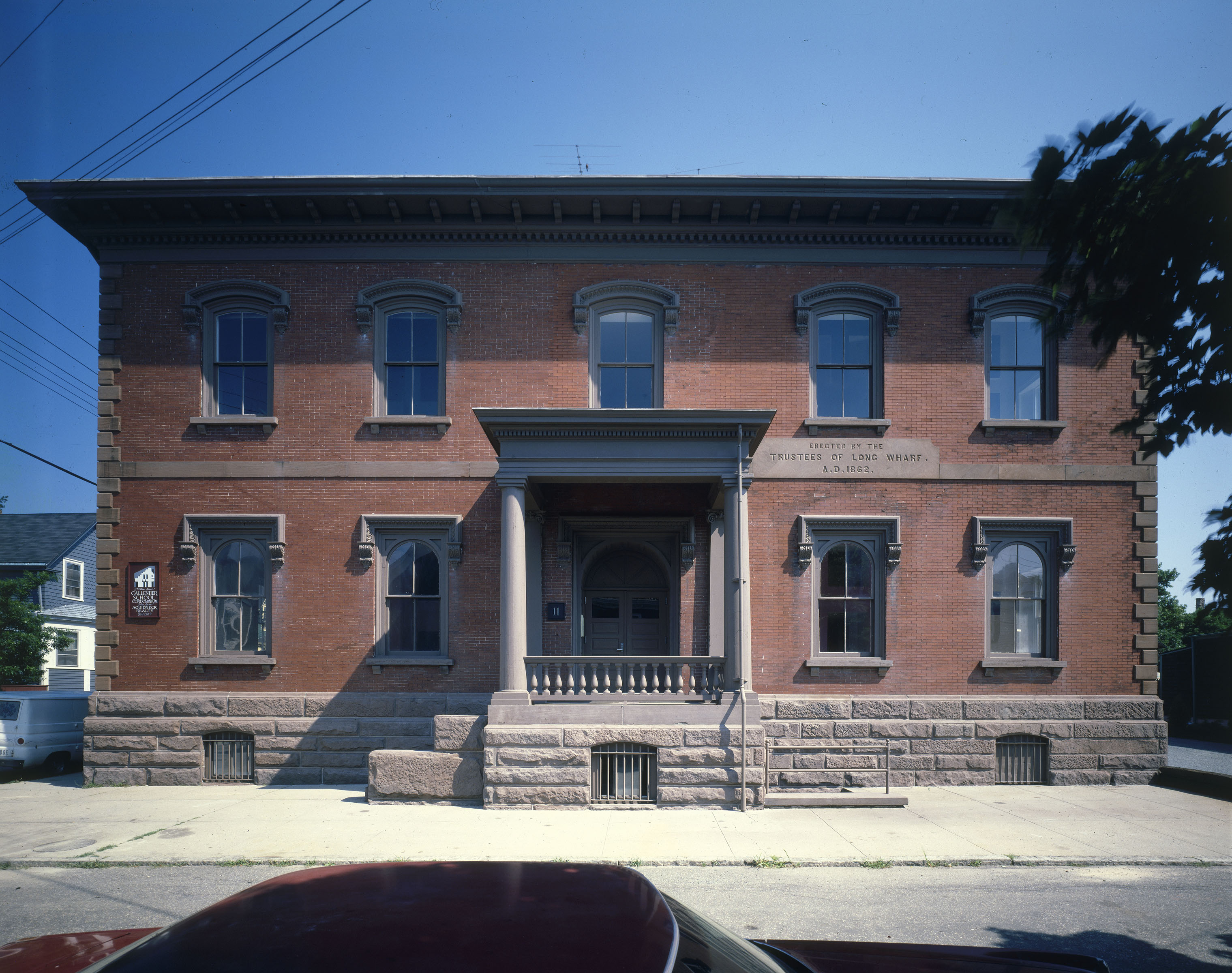
Callender School

Callender School

- The school building was constructed in 1862, and in 1909 it received a renovation. The building was made of Italianate brick. The acting superintendent of the Newport school system in December 1944 proposed closing Callendar and Coggeshall schools, but at the time the action was not done. Callendar School ultimately closed in January 1974. The building became a condominium.

Carey School

- In June 2009 Carey closed. A developer of condominiums bought the school in late 2011.

Thomas Coggeshall School

- The school, which opened in 1899, was named after former Newport City Council member and former mayor Thomas Coggeshall. Sean Flynn of The Newport Daily News stated that Coggeshall "is mostly known, though, for being firmly grounded in the neighborhood around Van Zandt Avenue, where the school is located." Coggeshall School's basement housed the school's computer lab and library, while the gymnasium was on the third floor. Every year the school celebrated a picnic day. It had 192 students in 2013.
- The acting superintendent of the Newport school system in December 1944 proposed closing Callendar and Coggeshall schools, but at the time the action was not done. It ultimately closed in 2013. On October 1, 2013 the school district gave the Coggeshall School to the city government.

Cranston-Calvert School

- It was formed by the merger of the Cranston School, built in 1876 and named after The Newport Daily News editor William H. Cranston, and the Calvert School, opened in 1887 and named after former mayor of Newport and poet George Henry Calvert. The two buildings were joined into one with an addition. The addition was funded by the Public Works Administration in the 1930s.
- A January 1, 1976 fire damaged the former Cranston portion, and students temporarily attended classes at First Presbyterian Church School from that day until April 1977. Sean Flynn stated that therefore the Cranston section had a more "modern" appearance stemming from the renovations taken after the fire. The auditorium, which occupied the addition, was used for physical education classes. The original cafeteria was in the basement. When new fire safety codes meant that the original cafeteria was no longer in compliance, a new cafeteria was made out of former classrooms on the third floor.
- The school closed in 2013. On October 1, 2013 the school district gave the Coggeshall School to the city government. The city council approved the purchase of the school by BCM Realty Partners and the Newport Project Development Corporation on March 14, 2018. The companies planned to convert the school into apartments with one and two-bedroom units available; a total of 34 units were proposed. The companies had offered $1 million for the complex.

Sheffield School

- Sheffield School had no playground facility. In June 2006 Sheffield closed. As of 2013 the school was still unoccupied.

Dr. Michael H. Sullivan School

- Its service area was northern Newport, and the student body had a relatively low socioeconomic level as its attendance boundary included various low-income apartment complexes. Maria Mare-Schulz became the principal in 1997. According to Mare-Schulz, in 1997 6% of the student body spoke Portuguese and/or Spanish while about 26-28% did so in 2012. In June 2011 Sullivan moved into the former Triplett school as the original Sullivan building was demolished to make way for the new Pell School. From 2011 until its 2013 closure the school was known as Sullivan-at-Triplett School. In 2018 Island Moving Company paid $900,000 to acquire the former Triplett Building.

George H. Triplett School

- Triplett had been commissioned in 1989, the building and land having been purchased from Jesus Savior Church of Newport, RI. Previously the school had been known as Jesus Savior School, a parochial school built in 1960 and closed in 1987. The district began a lease arrangement in the Jesus Savior building in 1989. In 2019 Island Moving Company paid $900,000 to acquire the former Triplett Building.
- The building later hosted the Aquidneck Island Adult Learning Center. In 2011 Sullivan School moved into the former Triplett building and became known as Sullivan-at-Triplett School until its closure in 2013.

William J. Underwood School

- Underwood School, in southern Newport, was named after former Rhode Island House of Representatives and Senate member William J. Underwood (1837-1906). Funded with $130,000 left from the estate of Underwood, it opened in 1962 to relieve overcrowding; the city government learned about the existence of the money in 1958.
- Children living on the grounds of Fort Adams attended Underwood. The school also received students from other parts of Newport as some other elementary schools had closed; three school buses served the school.
- The school, on a 3.2-acre (1.3 ha) site, had five buildings that had one story each, all made of wood framing. Ambrogi stated that "It’s a school design more appropriate to southern California or New Mexico" as inclement weather is common in Rhode Island. Members of the Newport community believed that Underwood School's modular classrooms were small and that the facility seemed more like a summer camp building instead of a school; therefore the school received the nickname "Camp Underwood". The school board minutes from October 1959 stated that the design was, according to consultant Dr. Carl H. Porter-Shirley, "that of a school village" made up of "self-contained" units. The school had no auditorium and no gymnasium.
- The school closed in June 2013, and the school district gave it to the city government on October 1, 2013. The property was sold in 2015 for lower than its $3 million appraisal.
