= Susan Braley Franklin =

American classics educator (1868–1955)

- Born: June 6, 1868; Newport
- Died: April 24, 1955 (aged 86); Newport
- Occupation: Classical scholar

Susan Braley Franklin (June 6, 1868 – April 24, 1955) was an American classical scholar and educator.

== Biography ==
Susan Braley Franklin was born on June 6, 1868 in Newport, Rhode Island, the daughter of William Barker Franklin, a baker, and Mary Adeline Braley Franklin.

She graduated from Rogers High School in 1885. Franklin earned an A.B. in 1889 and a Ph.D. in 1996 from Bryn Mawr College. Her dissertation was Traces of Epic Influence in the Tragedies of Aeschylus. She was the first woman to publish an article in the Transactions of the American Philological Association, "Public Appropriations for Individual Offerings and Sacrifices in Greece," in 1901.

While earning her Ph.D., Franklin was an instructor in Latin at Vassar College. She went on to teach Greek and Latin at Miss Florence Baldwin's School, then was head of classics at the Ethical Culture School in New York City from 1904 until 1920. She returned to Rogers High School and retired as head of their Latin department in 1934.

On April 24, 1955, Susan Braley Franklin was raped and murdered in her Newport home.

== Bibliography ==
- Selections from Latin Prose Authors for Sight Reading, with E.C. Greene (New York: American Book Co., 1903)
