= Boyd's Windmill =

Windmill in Middletown, Rhode Island

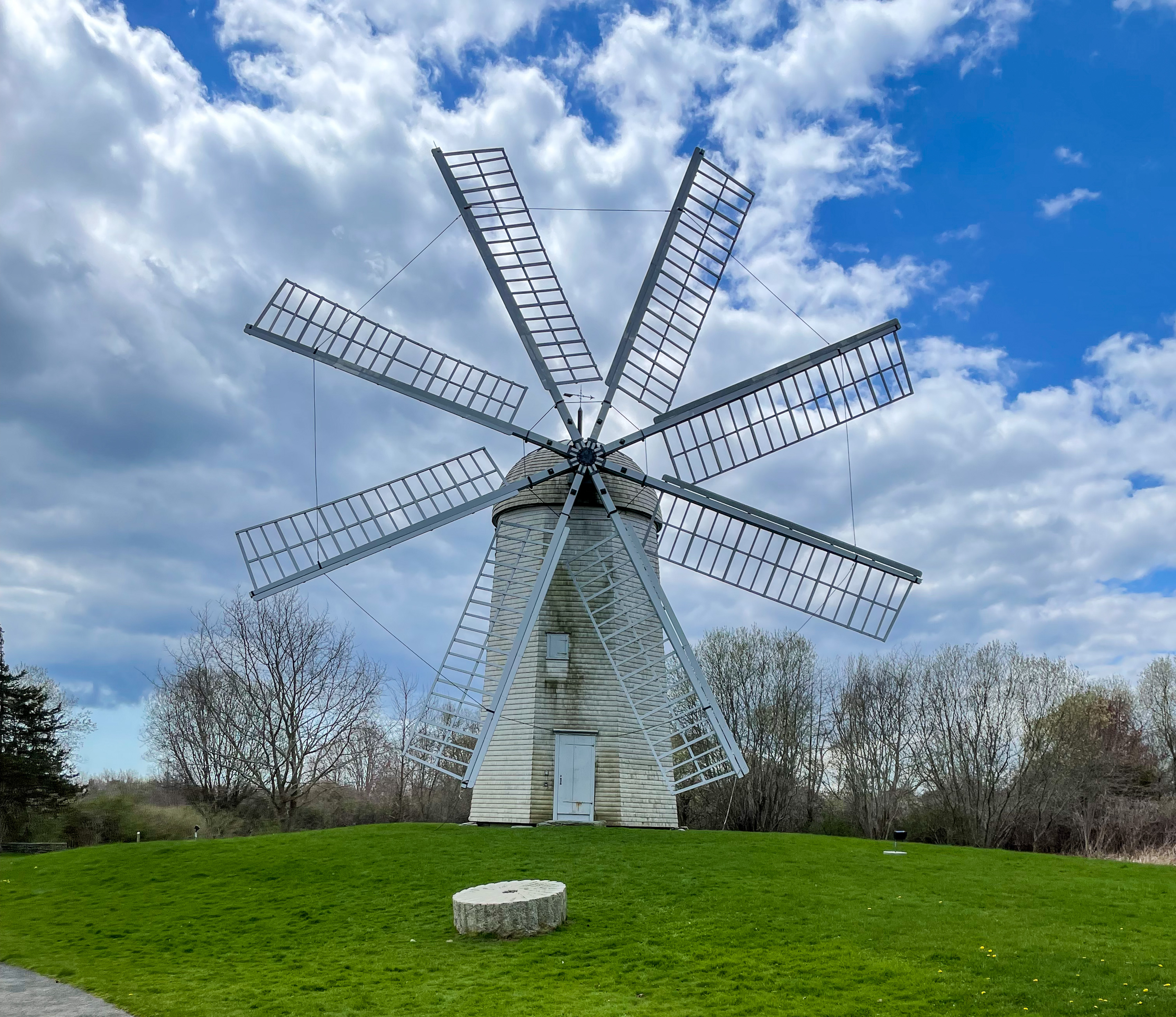
- Interactive map of Boyd's Windmill

Origin
- Mill name: Boyd's Mill
- Mill location: Middletown, RI
- Coordinates: 41.5007°N 71.2696°W
- Operator: Middletown Historical Society
- Year built: 1810

Information
- Purpose: Corn mill
- Type: Smock mill
- Storeys: Three-story smock
- Base storeys: A few courses of brick
- Smock sides: Eight sides
- No. of sails: Eight sails
- Type of sails: Common sails
Boyd's Windmill
U.S. National Register of Historic Places
Location within Rhode Island
NRHP reference No.	01000018
Added to NRHP	January 26, 2001

Boyd's Windmill, also known as Boyd's Wind Grist Mill, is a historic smock mill at Paradise Valley Park on Prospect Avenue in Middletown, Rhode Island. John Peterson built the windmill at the corner of Mill Lane and West Main Rd. in Portsmouth, Rhode Island in 1810, and William Boyd purchased it in 1815. It originally had four common sails, but four more were added by the family. The mill is a timber-frame structure, octagonal in shape, and about 30 feet (9.1 m) tall, with a rotating cap powered by eight vanes with canvas sheets. The grindstones in the middle of the mill are Fall River granite; the upper one, which is connected to the power mechanisms, rotates six times for each turn of the mill's main shaft. In 1916 Benjamin Boyd removed the original vanes and powered the mill using a gasoline engine. It is one of only two historic windmills (out of what was estimated to be more than thirty) to survive on Aquidneck Island.

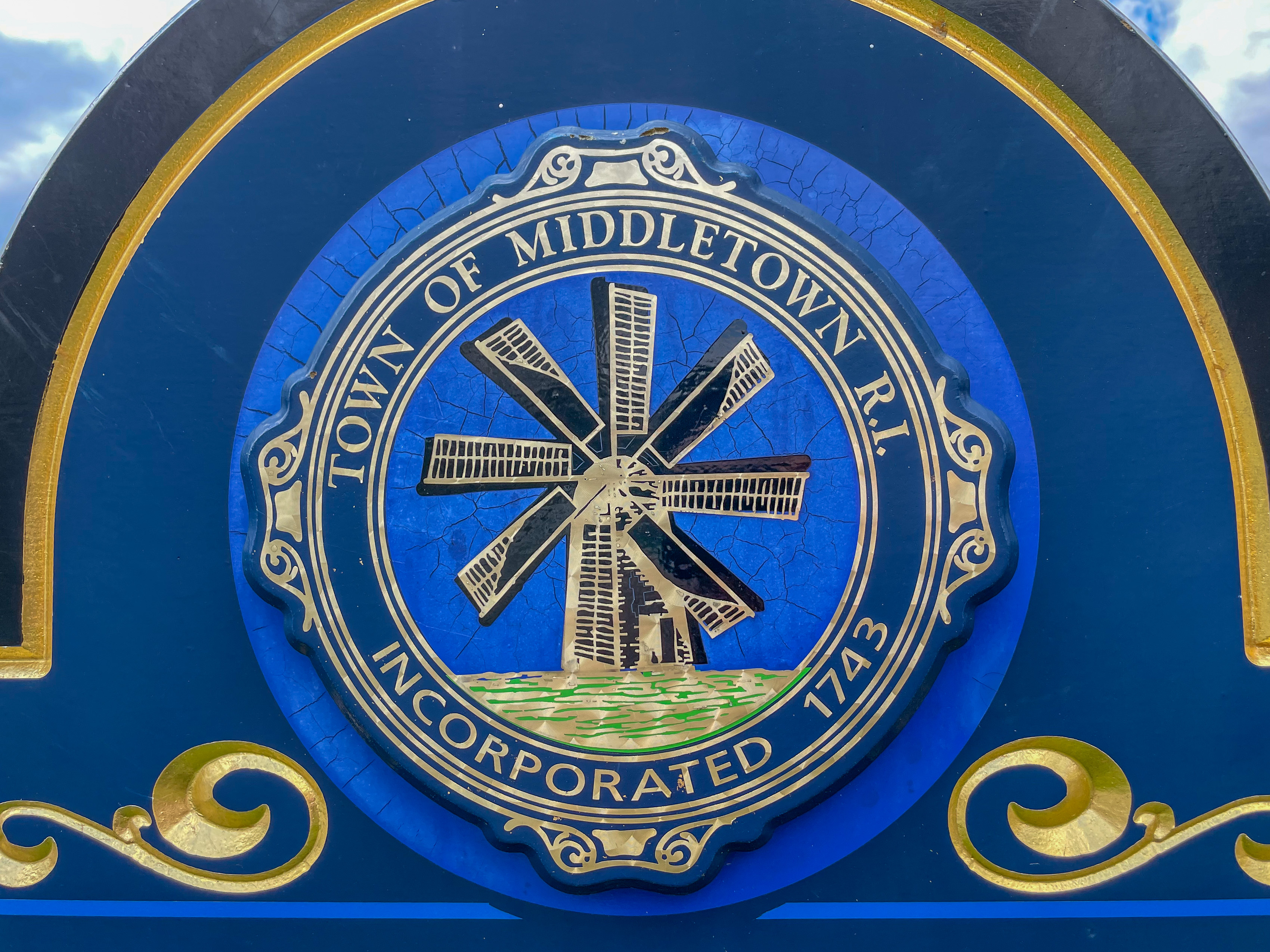
Town seal of Middletown

Boyd's Mill features prominently on the town seal of Middletown.

The windmill was restored by the Middletown Historical Society after receiving it as a donation in 1990 and moving it to Paradise Valley Park in Middletown. The windmill is open to the public on Sunday afternoons in July, August and September.

It was listed on the National Register of Historic Places in 2001.

== See also ==
- National Register of Historic Places listings in Newport County, Rhode Island
