= John Mellekas =

American football player (1933–2015)

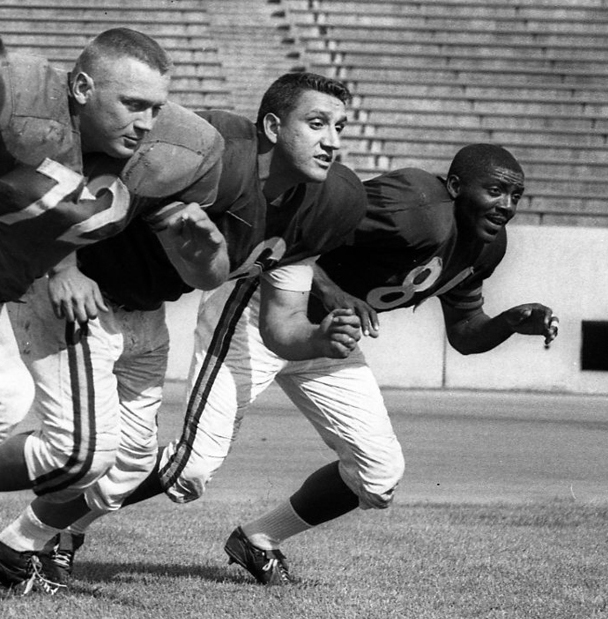
- Mellekas (center) with the Bears in 1961

No. 76, 75, 65
- Positions: Center, tackle, defensive tackle

Personal information
- Born: June 14, 1933; Newport, Rhode Island, U.S.
- Died: June 2, 2015 (aged 81); Newport, Rhode Island, U.S.
- Listed height: 6 ft 3 in (1.91 m)
- Listed weight: 255 lb (116 kg)

Career information
- High school: Rogers (Newport)
- College: Arizona (1952–1955)
- NFL draft: 1956: 4th round, 47th overall pick

Career history
- Chicago Bears (1956–1961); San Francisco 49ers (1962); Philadelphia Eagles (1963)

Awards and highlights
- Rogers High School Hall of Fame, 2008

Career NFL statistics
- Games played: 84
- Games started: 52
- Fumble recoveries: 5
- Stats at Pro Football Reference

John Stavros Mellekas (June 14, 1933 – June 2, 2015) was an American professional football offensive lineman in the National Football League (NFL).

Mellekas played 4 years of football and basketball at Rogers High School in Newport and was named as an inaugural inductee into the Rogers High School hall of fame in January 2008 and then played college football at the University of Arizona. He was a 4th round selection (47th overall pick) in the 1956 NFL draft by the Chicago Bears. He played for the Bears (1956–1961), the San Francisco 49ers (1962), and the Philadelphia Eagles (1963).

Following his career, he was employed by the Newport school department as a physical education teacher for 36 years, retiring in 1996. Mellekas died in his hometown of Newport, Rhode Island on June 2, 2015. He was a Greek Orthodox Christian.
