= John P. Vinti =

American theoretical physicist

John Pascal Vinti (January 16, 1907, Newport, Rhode Island – September 28, 1990, Boston) was an American theoretical physicist, who published papers not only in physics, but also in mathematics and engineering. He is known for the Vinti integral.

== Biography ==
His father, Giovanni Giuseppe Vinti (1885–1959), was born in Naples, Italy. In 1922 John P. Vinti graduated from Rogers High School in Newport, Rhode Island. At his high school graduation, he was honored with a prize in scholarship and a prize in mathematics. At age 15 Vinti matriculated at Massachusetts Institute of Technology (MIT). There he graduated with a bachelor's degree in mathematics in 1927 and a Ph.D. in physics in 1932. His thesis Ph.D. thesis is entitled Variational calculation of atomic wave functions. As a postdoc he worked at the University of Pennsylvania from 1932 to 1934 on helium's absorption spectrum. He was from 1934 to 1935 an assistant at MIT, from 1936 to 1937 an instructor at Brown University, from 1937 to 1938 an assistant professor at The Citadel, and from 1939 to 1941 an instructor at Worcester Polytechnic Institute. In 1941 he joined the physics staff of the Ballistics Research Laboratory at Maryland's Aberdeen Proving Ground. There he became chief of the Interior Ballistics Theory Section and a senior physicist (as of 1945). At Aberdeen he developed a keen interest in celestial mechanics and "a close professional relationship with John von Neumann and Maria Goeppert-Mayer."

Later in his career, Vinti taught and did research at MIT as a professor in the department of aeronautics and astronautics in the 1970s and 1980s.

Lecture notes that Vinti used in a course that he taught in 1966 at the Catholic University of America and later at MIT were posthumously published in 1998 as the book Orbital and Celestial Mechanics, edited by Gim J. Der and Nino L. Bonavito. According to Der and Bonavito, Vinti's spheroidal method was "many years ahead of its time" and "predicts position and velocity vectors for satellites and ballistic missiles almost as accurately as numerical integration."

He was elected in 1936 a Fellow of the American Physical Society.

Upon his death, John P. Vinti was survived by his sisters, Helena (1908–1995) and Anna (1911–2001), and their children. His nephew Jack Edmonston was his executor and was entrusted with the publication of Orbital and Celestial Mechanics.

John P. Vinti is a distant relative of Italian mathematician Calogero Vinti, who is memorialized by the Vinti Prize.

John P. Vinti is buried in Newton Cemetery in Newton, Massachusetts.

== Selected publications ==
- Vinti, John P. (1939). "Isotope Shift in Magnesium". Physical Review. 56 (11): 1120–1132. Bibcode:1939PhRv...56.1120V. doi:10.1103/PhysRev.56.1120.
- —— (1932). "Sum Rules for Atomic Transition Probabilities". Physical Review. 41 (4): 432–442. Bibcode:1932PhRv...41..432V. doi:10.1103/PhysRev.41.432.
- —— (1932). "The Dispersion and Absorption of Helium". Physical Review. 42 (5): 632–640. Bibcode:1932PhRv...42..632V. doi:10.1103/PhysRev.42.632.
- ——; Morse, P. M. (1933). "Variable Scale Atomic Wave Functions". Physical Review. 43 (5): 337–340. Bibcode:1933PhRv...43..337V. doi:10.1103/PhysRev.43.337.
- —— (1933). "The Continuous Absorption Spectrum of Helium". Physical Review. 44 (7): 524–528. Bibcode:1933PhRv...44..524V. doi:10.1103/PhysRev.44.524.
- Witmer, E. E.; —— (1935). "Symmetry Properties and the Identity of Similar Particles". Physical Review. 47 (7): 538–541. Bibcode:1935PhRv...47..538W. doi:10.1103/PhysRev.47.538.
- —— (1939). "Isotope Shift in Magnesium". Physical Review. 56 (11): 1120–1132. Bibcode:1939PhRv...56.1120V. doi:10.1103/PhysRev.56.1120.
- —— (1940). "Isotope Shift in Boron". Physical Review. 58 (10): 879–881. Bibcode:1940PhRv...58..879V. doi:10.1103/PhysRev.58.879.
- —— (1940). "A Theorem on Nuclear Motion in Atomic Spectra". Physical Review. 58 (10): 882–883. Bibcode:1940PhRv...58..882V. doi:10.1103/PhysRev.58.882.
- ——; Montgomery, D. J. X. (1949). "Note on the Presentation of Maxwell's Equations". American Journal of Physics. 17 (5): 298–300. Bibcode:1949AmJPh..17..298V. doi:10.1119/1.1989580.
- —— (1951). "Note on a series of products of three Legendre polynomials". Proceedings of the American Mathematical Society. 2: 19–23. doi:10.1090/S0002-9939-1951-0043266-1.
- —— (1953). "Theory of the Penetration of γ-Rays through Thin Barriers". Physical Review. 91 (2): 345–348. Bibcode:1953PhRv...91..345V. doi:10.1103/PhysRev.91.345.
- —— (1957). "Theory of the electromagnetic field about an antenna, according to the gap model". Applied Scientific Research. 6: 323–336. doi:10.1007/BF02410440. S2CID 120257233.
- ——; Leser, Tadeusz (1957). "The Sums of Certain Series Involving Bessel Functions". Journal of the Society for Industrial and Applied Mathematics. 5 (1): 15–31. doi:10.1137/0105002.
  - ——; Leser, T. (1963). "Errata: The Sums of Certain Series Involving Bessel Functions". Journal of the Society for Industrial and Applied Mathematics. 11 (3): 829. doi:10.1137/0111060.
- —— (1959). "New method of solution for unretarded satellite orbits". Journal of Research of the National Bureau of Standards. 63 (2): 105–116. doi:10.6028/jres.063B.012.
- —— (1960). "Theory of the Orbit of an Artificial Satellite with Use of Spheroidal Coordinates". The Astronomical Journal. 65: 353. Bibcode:1960AJ.....65..353V. doi:10.1086/108267.
- —— (1961). "Formulae for an accurate intermediary orbit of an artificial satellite". The Astronomical Journal. 66: 514. Bibcode:1961AJ.....66..514V. doi:10.1086/108452.
- —— (1963). "Zonal Harmonic Perturbations of an Accurate". Journal of Research of the National Bureau of Standards: Radio Propagation. D. 67: 191.
- —— (1966). "Accurate Reference Orbit of an Artificial Satellite". Journal of Research of the National Bureau of Standards: Mathematics and Mathematical Physics. B. 70: 17.
- —— (1966). "Effects of a constant force on a Keplerian orbit". The Theory of Orbits in the Solar System and in Stellar Systems. 25: 355. Bibcode:1966IAUS...25..355V.
- —— (1968). Improvement of the spheroidal method for artificial satellites (No. RE-47) (PDF).
- —— (1969). "Conservation laws and Liapounov stability of the free rotation of a rigid body". Celestial Mechanics. 1 (1): 59–71. Bibcode:1969CeMec...1...59V. doi:10.1007/BF01230633. hdl:2060/19680024910. S2CID 121312244.
- —— (1971). "Representation of the Earth's gravitational potential". Celestial Mechanics. 4 (3–4): 348–367. Bibcode:1971CeMec...4..348V. doi:10.1007/BF01231397. hdl:2060/19710005295. S2CID 120077192. 1971
- —— (1973). "Quadrature solution for the general relativistic motion of a satellite or a planet". Celestial Mechanics. 8 (2): 235–244. Bibcode:1973CeMec...8..235V. doi:10.1007/BF01231422. S2CID 121711778.
- —— (1974). "Classical Solution of the Two-Body Problem if the Gravitational Constant Diminishes Inversely with the Age of the Universe". Monthly Notices of the Royal Astronomical Society. 169 (3): 417–427. doi:10.1093/mnras/169.3.417.
- —— (1977). "Newtonian cosmology with a varying gravitational constant". Celestial Mechanics. 16 (4): 391–406. Bibcode:1977CeMec..16..391V. doi:10.1007/BF01229283. S2CID 120663418.
