= Middletown High School (Rhode Island) =

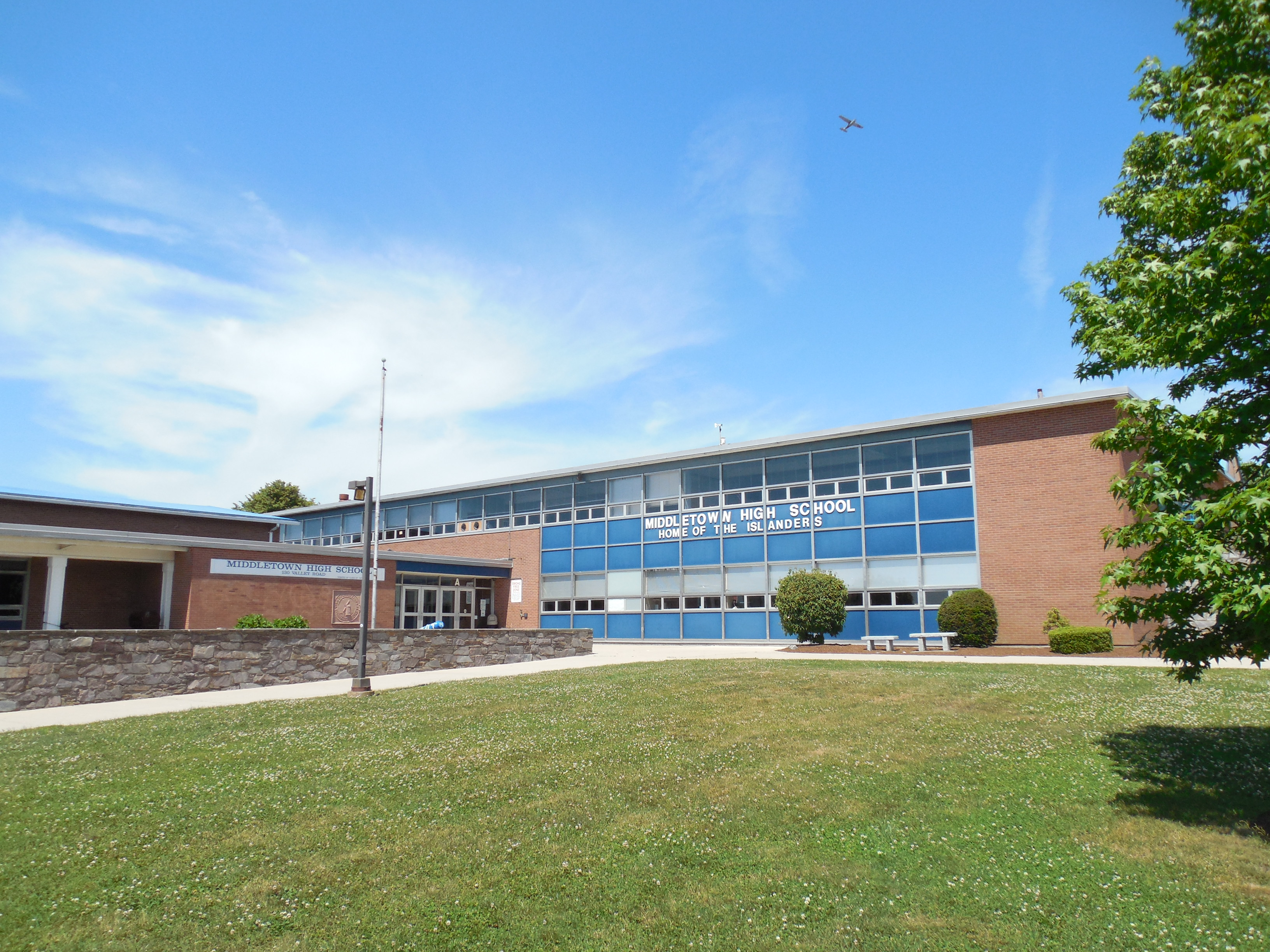

Location
- 130 Valley Road; Middletown, Rhode Island; United States
- 41°31′3.59″N 71°17′13.39″W

Information
- Type: Public High School
- Motto: Be kind, be honest, be safe, take pride, and have a great day!
- Established: 1961
- School district: Middletown Public Schools
- Principal: Donna Sweet
- Teaching staff: 50.20 (FTE)
- Grades: 9–12
- Enrollment: 567 (2022-2023)
- Student to teacher ratio: 11.29
- Colors: Royal Blue and White
- Athletics: Football, Basketball, Baseball, Tennis, Wrestling, Cross Country, Volleyball, Golf, Track/Field, Gymnastics, Hockey, Lacrosse, Soccer, Swimming.
- Mascot: Wave
- Nickname: Islanders
- Accreditation: NEASC
- Website: www.mpsri.net/o/mhs

Middletown High School is a public high school located on Aquidneck Island in Rhode Island, United States. A part of Middletown Public Schools, it serves approximately 730 students from 9th through 12th grades and was established in 1961.

== History ==
Sergeant Michael F Paranzino, class of 2006, was killed on 5 November 2010 by an improvised explosive device in Afghanistan.

The 2012 homecoming dance was shut down due to protests of an anti-grinding rule. Students began protesting and shouting profanities; the dance was abruptly ended by the Middletown superintendent, Rosemarie Kraeger.

== Curriculum ==
The grading system operates on a 4.0 GPA scale, 5.0 GPA scale for AP classes, with a possible grade range of A (93-100) to F (<65). Course grades are reported on a quarterly basis, and the day to day schedule is block scheduled on a three-day cycle.

=== Coursework available ===
Students attending Middletown High School have a variety of classes available to them, ranging from career oriented classes such as Healthcare Science to advanced science and classes such as AP Chemistry, AP Biology and AP Calculus. There are also many options for students interested in humanities - MHS offers French and Spanish classes from entry level to Advanced Placement level as well as entry level and AP level history and English courses. MHS does not impose any prerequisites upon students, thus allowing any student wishing to challenge themselves the opportunity to do so. Despite lacking official prerequisites, students are often heavily discouraged from taking classes in an order that deviates from the standard.

=== Graduation requirements ===
- English - four years
- Social Studies - three years
- Mathematics - four years
- Science - three years
- World Language - two years (recommended)
- Art or Music - one semester/proficiency
- Physical Education - four Semesters
- Health - two Semesters
- Twenty hours of community service and a 500 word reflection letter
- Capstone project, presentation, and research paper

=== Extra curriculars ===
- Leo Club
- Band
- Math Team
- Best Buddies
- Mock Trial
- Chorus
- Harvard Model United Nations
- National Honor Society
- Drama Club
- Student Council
- FIRST Robotics Competition
- Unified Theater
- Unified Basketball
- Student Government
- CyberPatriot

== U.S. News & World Report 2014 Silver Medal Award Winner ==
In 2014, Middletown High School was recognized nationally for its academic achievements. Middletown High School ranked number 1359 across the U.S. for its state rankings in mathematics and reading comprehension. College readiness is also a major determination factor that supports this report. Students were tested in each subject on a state proficiency exam. After the results were collected, Middletown High School was ranked one of the best high schools according to U.S. News & World Report.

== Alumni ==
- Michael Flynn, former National Security Advisor of the United States (Class of 1977)
- Richard Hatch, winner of the first season of Survivor (Class of 1979)
- Charles A. Flynn, current lieutenant general in the US Army and Michael Flynn's younger brother (Class of 1981)
