= Middletown, Rhode Island =

- Town
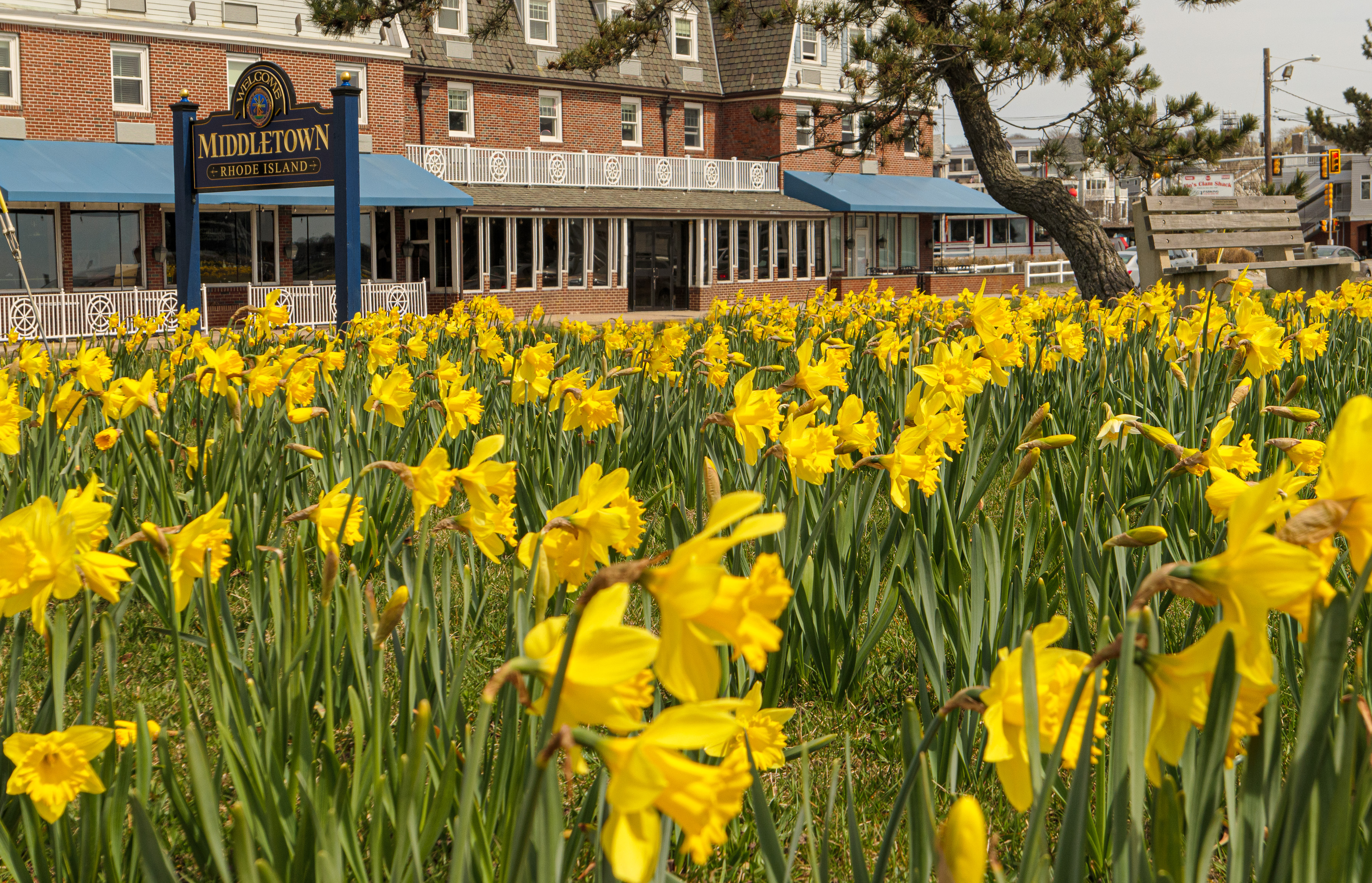
- Dunlap-Wheeler Park

- Seal Logo

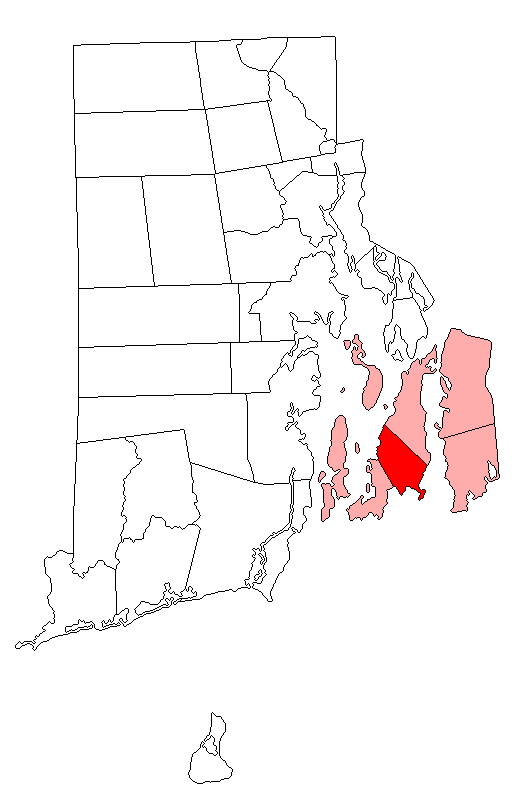
- Location of Middletown in Newport County, Rhode Island
- Coordinates: 41°30′42″N 71°17′12″W
- Country: United States
- State: Rhode Island
- County: Newport
- Incorporated: 1743

Government
  - Town Council: President Paul M. Rodrigues; Vice President Thomas Welch; Peter Connerton; Christopher Logan; Emily Tessier; Dennis Turano; Barbara A. VonVillas

Area
  - Total: 14.9 sq mi (38.7 km^{2})
  - Land: 13.0 sq mi (33.6 km^{2})
  - Water: 2.0 sq mi (5.1 km^{2})
- Elevation: 148 ft (45 m)

Population (2020)
  - Total: 17,075
  - Density: 1,320/sq mi (508/km^{2})
- Time zone: UTC−5 (Eastern (EST))
  - Summer (DST): UTC−4 (EDT)
- ZIP Code: 02842
- Area code: 401
- FIPS code: 44-45460
- GNIS feature ID: 1220063
- Website: www.middletownri.gov

Middletown is a town in Newport County, Rhode Island, United States. The population was 17,075 at the 2020 census. It lies to the south of Portsmouth and to the north of Newport on Aquidneck Island, hence the name "Middletown."

== History ==
Issues including unjust taxation and a growing population caused the freeholders living in the northern section of Newport to petition the General Assembly for independence. As a result of the petition, the land that Middletown occupies was set apart in 1731. The town was incorporated in 1743.

During the 1980s, large sections of East Main Road and West Main Road running through Middletown began to be commercialized, and by the late 1990s, the area had become Aquidneck Island's central business district.

Today, the community boasts a strong business district that relies heavily on Naval Station Newport and defense industries.

Middletown also maintains its "small-town charm" with scenic vistas of the Atlantic Ocean, world-class beaches, hiking trails and open spaces.

== Geography ==
According to the United States Census Bureau, the town has a total area of 14.9 square miles (38.7 km^{2}), of which 13.0 square miles (33.6 km^{2}) is land and 2.0 square miles (5.1 km^{2}; 13.18%) is water. Middletown was known as the "farming community" of Aquidneck Island. Today most of the developed land is located towards the western part of the town, while what is left of its rural heritage is primarily towards the east. Middletown also has several beaches.

The census-designated place of Newport East and part of the Melville CDP lie within the town boundaries.

Parks and beaches

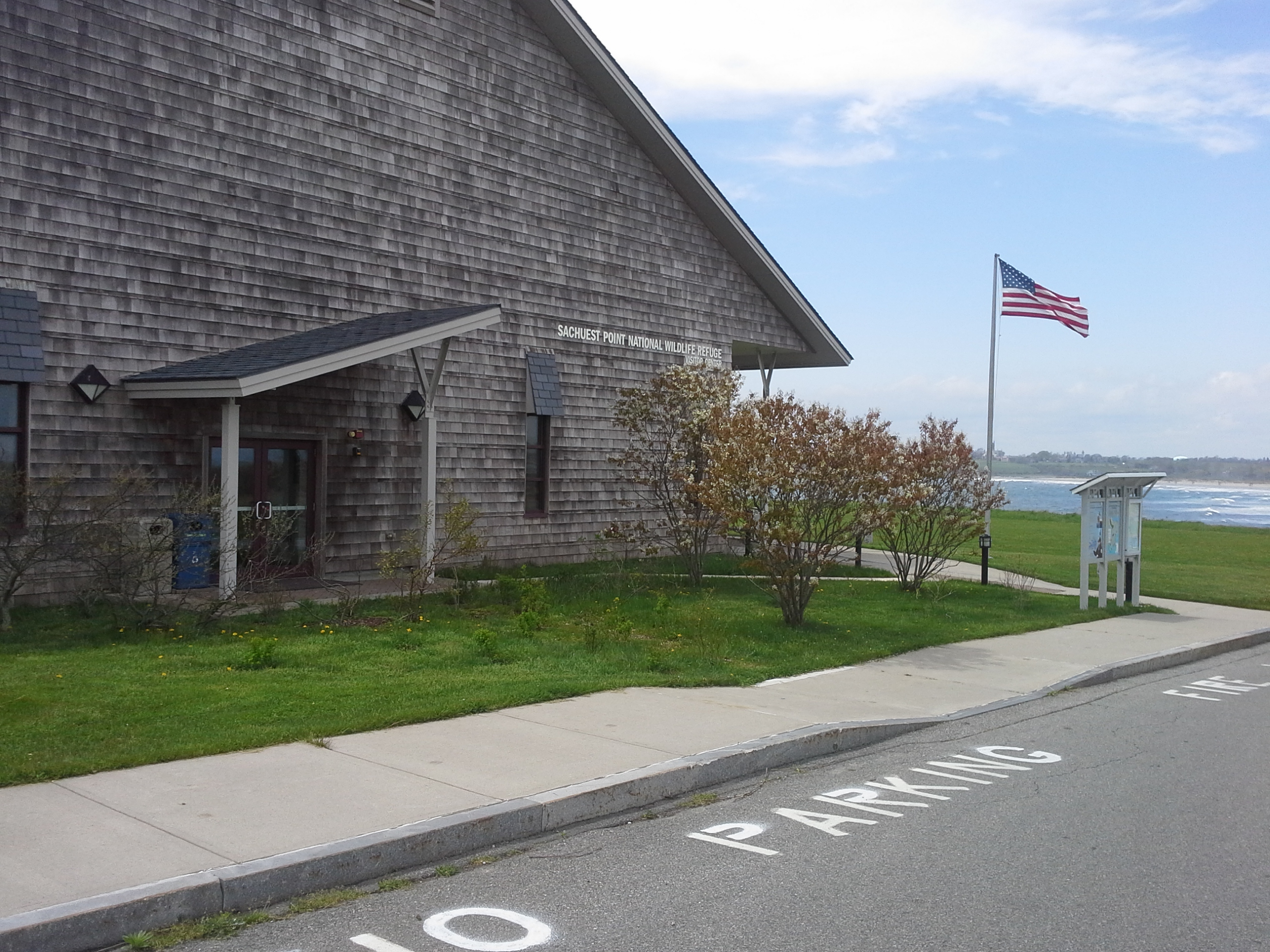
Sachuest Point

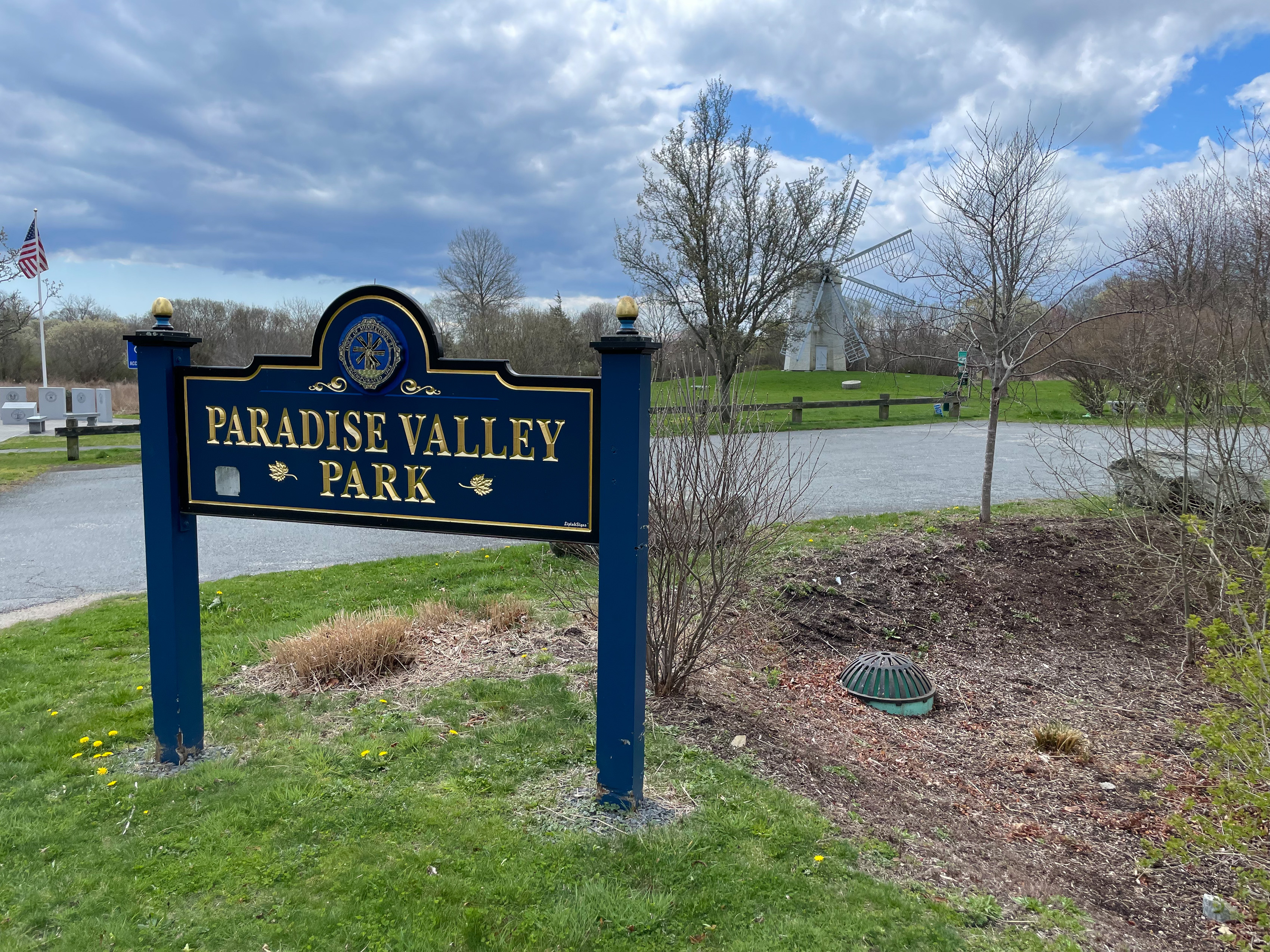
Paradise Valley Park

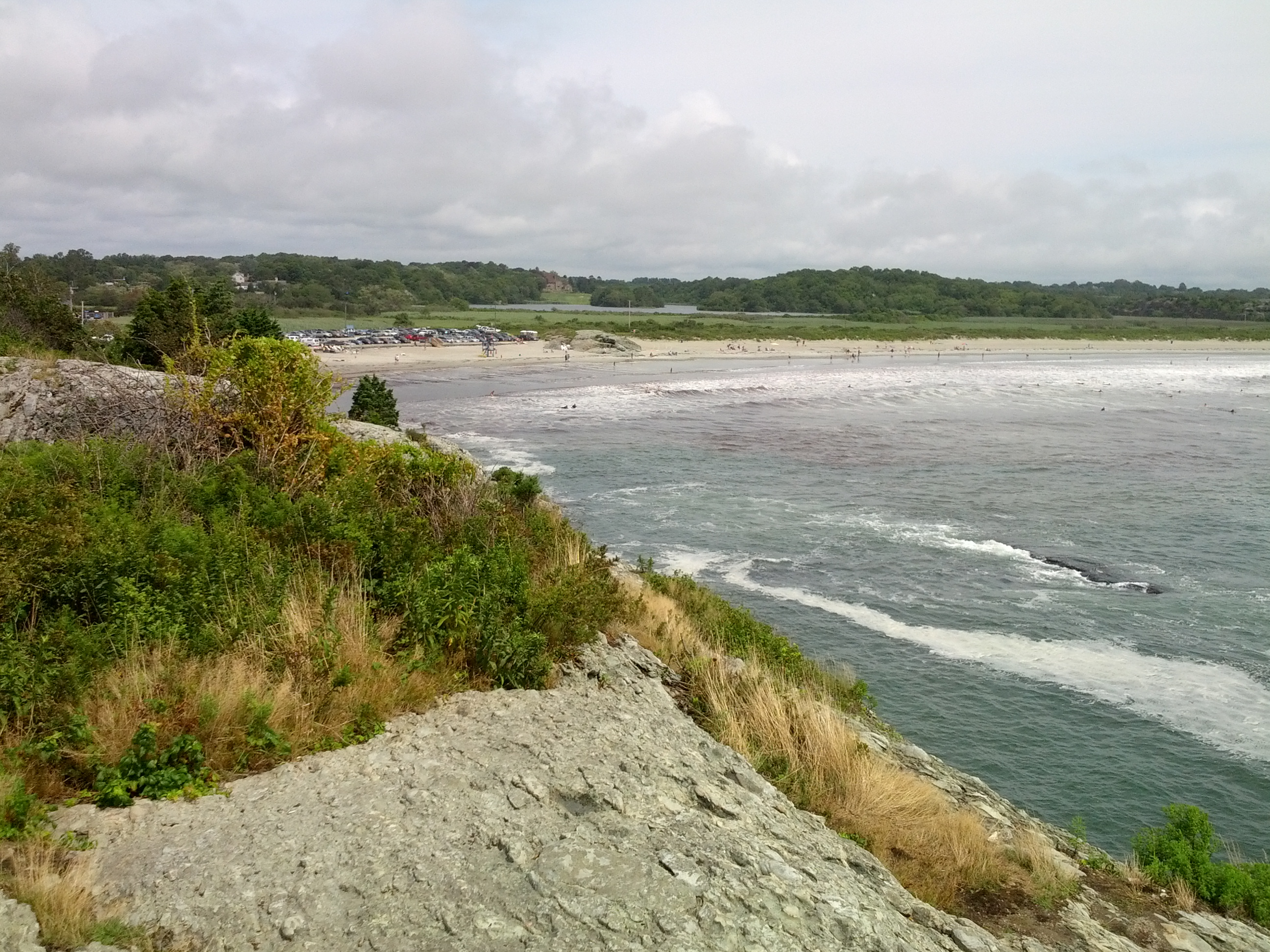
Second Beach

=== Parks and beaches ===
Middletown is home to Sachuest Point National Wildlife Refuge, as well as public two beaches and a myriad of open space and recreational opportunities:

- Second Beach (also known as Sachuest Beach), a south-facing beach with concessions, showers, and bathrooms. The west part is known as Surfer's End.
- Third Beach, is an east-facing beach with fewer waves, grills, and picnic tables.

Parks in Middletown include:

- Albro Woods
- Demery Memorial Park
- Dunlap-Wheeler Park
- Gaudet Athletic Complex
- Green End Fort
- Howland Park
- Linden Park
- Middletown Town Beach
- Middletown Valley Park
- Norman Bird Sanctuary
- Paradise Valley Park
- Prescott Farm
- Purgatory Chasm
- Sakonnet Greenway Trail
- Starlight Drive-In Multiuse Fields
- Witherbee School
- Wyatt Road Soccer Complex

== Government ==
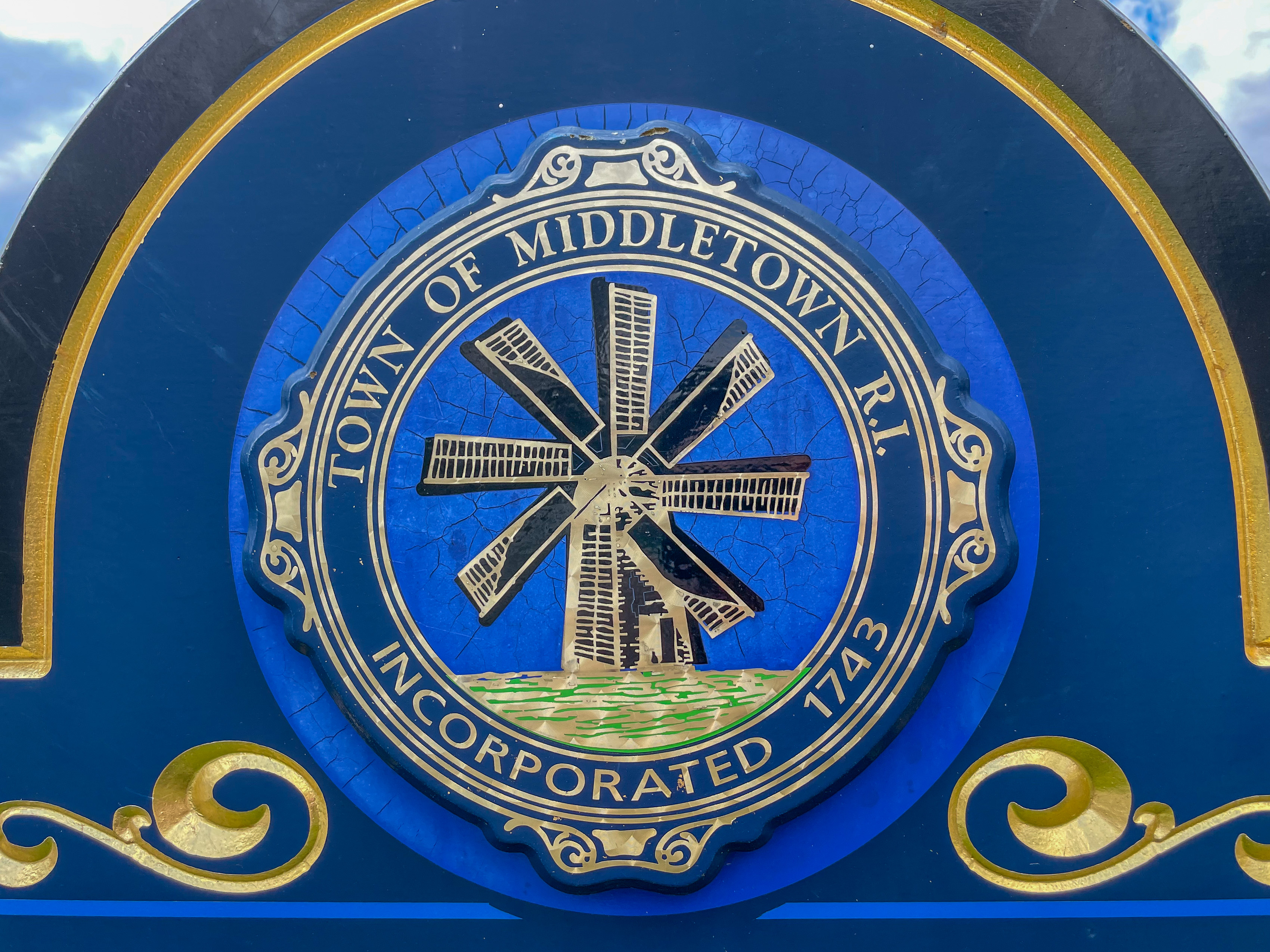
The town seal depicts historic Boyd's Windmill.

The town is governed by a seven-member Town Council, elected at-large in non-partisan elections. Executive authority is vested in an appointed town administrator (on the council–manager model). The town also elects a non-partisan School Committee.

Middletown forms part of Rhode Island's 1st congressional district, represented by Democrat Gabe Amo. At the state level, Middletown is part of one state senate and three state house districts. The 12th Rhode Island Senate district, which also includes parts of Newport, Little Compton and Tiverton, is held by Democrat Louis P. DiPalma. In the Rhode Island House of Representatives, Middletown forms part of the 72nd, 73rd, and 74th districts. The 72nd, which also includes a portion of Portsmouth, is represented by Democrat Terri Cortvriend. The 73rd, which is predominantly Newport, is held by Democrat Marvin Abney. The 74th, shared between Middletown and Jamestown, is represented by Democrat Alex Finkelman.

== Demographics ==
Historical population
| Census | Pop. | Note | %± |
|---|---|---|---|
| 1790 | 840 | | — |
| 1800 | 913 | | 8.7% |
| 1810 | 976 | | 6.9% |
| 1820 | 949 | | −2.8% |
| 1830 | 915 | | −3.6% |
| 1840 | 891 | | −2.6% |
| 1850 | 830 | | −6.8% |
| 1860 | 1,012 | | 21.9% |
| 1870 | 971 | | −4.1% |
| 1880 | 1,139 | | 17.3% |
| 1890 | 1,154 | | 1.3% |
| 1900 | 1,457 | | 26.3% |
| 1910 | 1,708 | | 17.2% |
| 1920 | 2,004 | | 17.3% |
| 1930 | 2,499 | | 24.7% |
| 1940 | 3,379 | | 35.2% |
| 1950 | 7,382 | | 118.5% |
| 1960 | 12,675 | | 71.7% |
| 1970 | 29,290 | | 131.1% |
| 1980 | 17,216 | | −41.2% |
| 1990 | 19,460 | | 13.0% |
| 2000 | 17,334 | | −10.9% |
| 2010 | 16,150 | | −6.8% |
| 2020 | 17,075 | | 5.7% |
U.S. Decennial Census

At the 2020 census, there were 17,075 people and 7,237 households in the town. The population density was 1,344.5 inhabitants per square mile (519.1/km^{2}). There were 8,029 housing units in the town. The racial makeup of the town was 78.48% White, 4.98% African American, 0.41% Native American, 3.4% Asian, 0.13% Pacific Islander, 3.36% from other races, and 9.24% from two or more races. Hispanic or Latino of any race were 7.92% of the population.

There were 7,237 households, of which 26.1% had children under the age of 18 living with them, 43.8% were married couples living together, 27% had a female householder with no spouse present, and 20.5% had a male householder with no spouse present. Of all households, 13.9% were made up of individuals, and 4.5% had someone living alone who was 65 years of age or older. The average household size was 2.29 and the average family size was 2.86.

Of the population, 18.9% were under the age of 18, 6.1% from 18 to 24, 25.9% from 25 to 44, 26.6% from 45 to 64, and 22.5% who were 65 years of age or older. The median age was 44.2 years.

The median household income was $97,650 and the median family income was $124,713. The per capita income for the town was $56,184. About 10.0% of the population was below the poverty line, including 14.1% of those under age 18 and 11.0% of those age 65 or over.

== Transportation ==
Newport State Airport, a public-use general aviation airport and the only airport on Aquidneck Island, is located in Middletown.

West Main Road (RI-114) and East Main Road (RI-138) are the main roads running north–south through Middletown.

== Sports ==
Middletown is home to St Columba's Cricket Club, which hosts an annual cricket tournament for teams throughout the New England area. The Newport National Golf Club is located in Middletown. The town is also home to the Middletown Islanders hockey, football, baseball, volleyball, and lacrosse teams. They also are involved with Pop Warner football and cheerleading. More known as a middle school football league, Pop Warner hosts from very young ages and separates them by age.

- Kids ages 6–8: Mighty Mights
- Kids ages 9 & 10: Junior Pee Wee
- Kids ages 11 & 12: Pee Wee
- Kids ages 13 & 14: Midget

Skater Island was a skate park located in Middletown. This park was bought by the Flynn, Hall and O'Niel families of Rhode Island because residents in the state felt the need for such a recreation area to support people's interest in sports related to the facility. The park included state-of-the-art designs for skateboarders and for bikers. The park was featured in Tony Hawk's Pro Skater 3 in 2001. The park was closed in May 2004 as a result of the building's roof collapsing.

== Schools ==
Schools

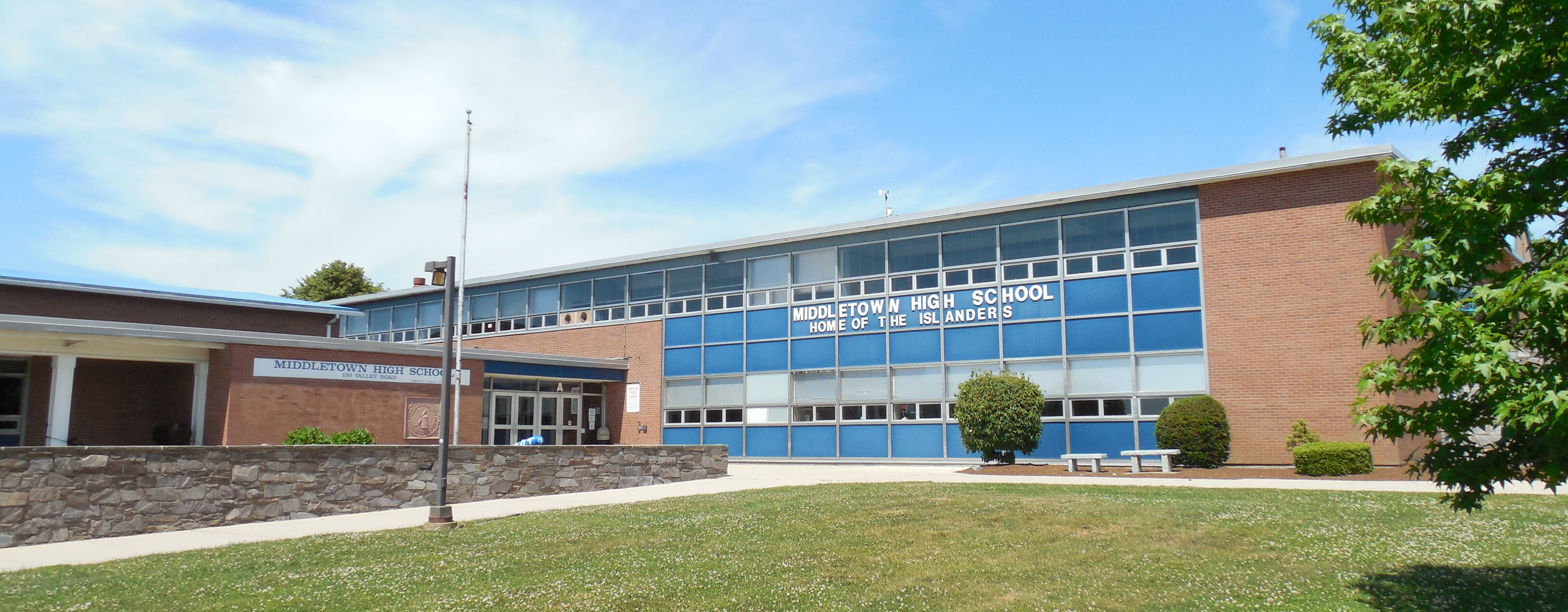
Middletown High School

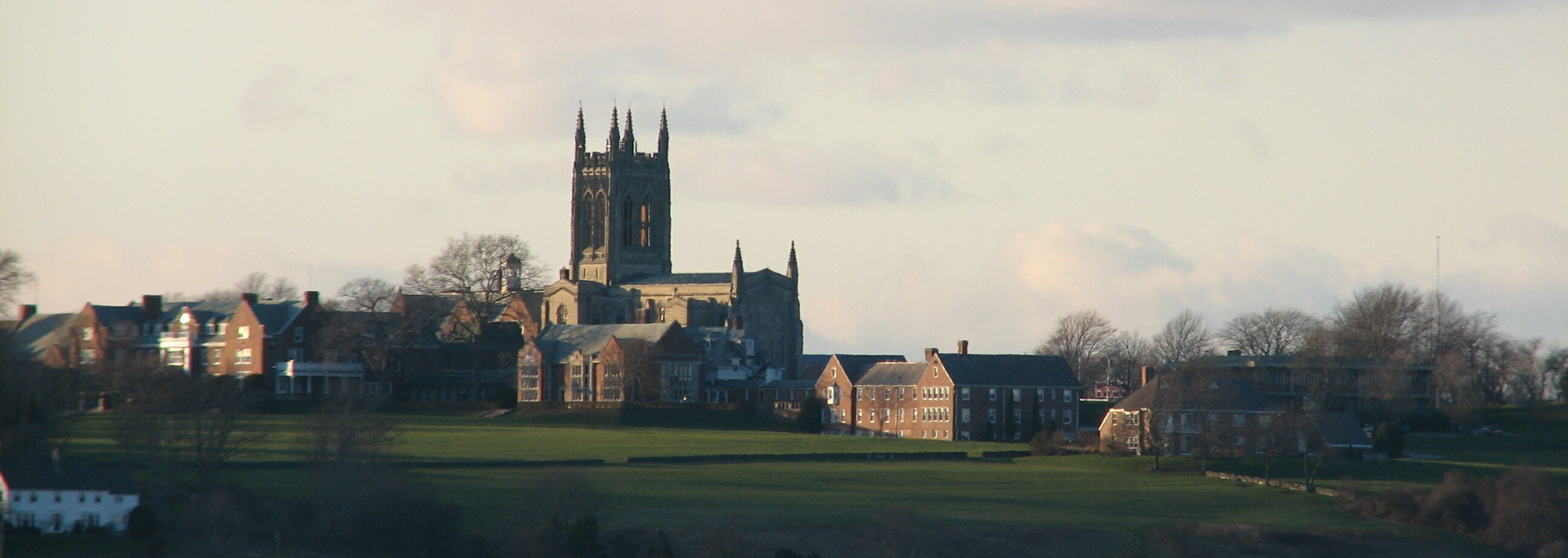
St. George's School

The Middletown Public School District consists of four schools serving pre-kindergarten through 12th grade. They are Aquidneck Elementary School (grades Pre-K to 3), Forest Avenue Elementary School (grades K–3), Joseph H. Gaudet Middle School (grades 4–8) and Middletown High School (grades 9–12).

Middletown is also home to private schools, including All Saints Academy (grades K–8), a Catholic school, and St. George's School (grades 9–12).

== Historic sites in Middletown ==
Historic sites

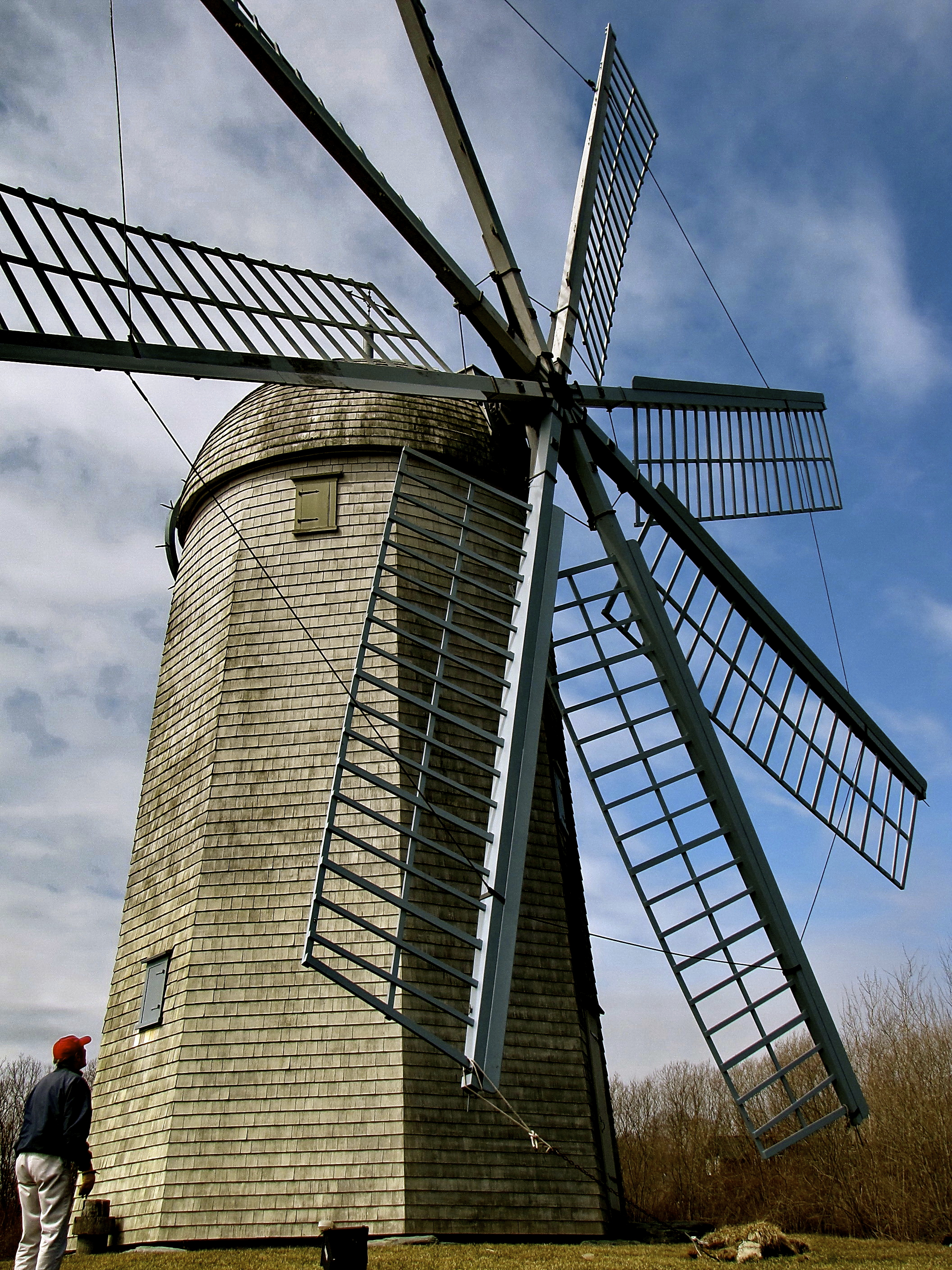
Boyd's Windmill

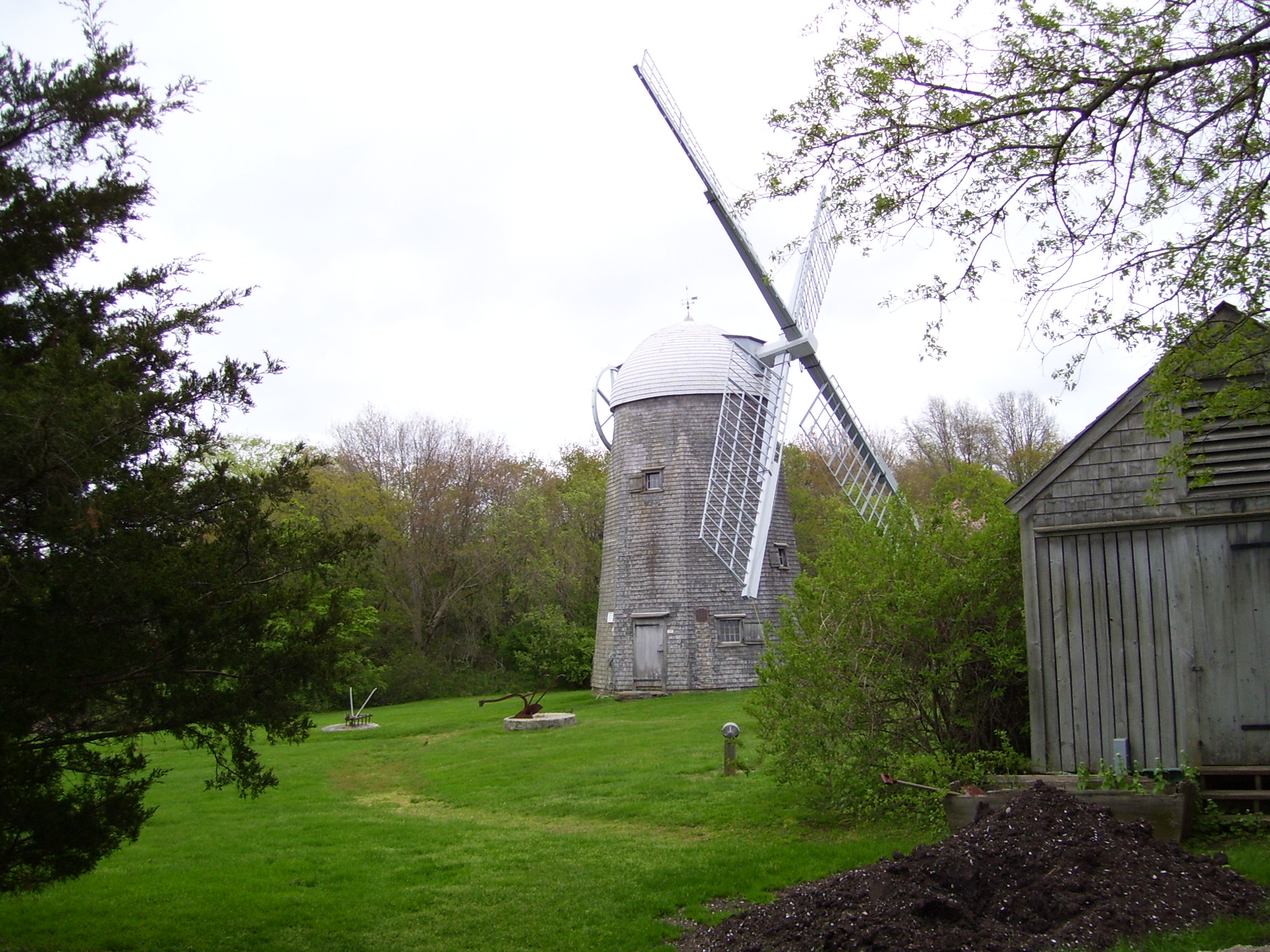
c. 1811 windmill on Prescott Farm

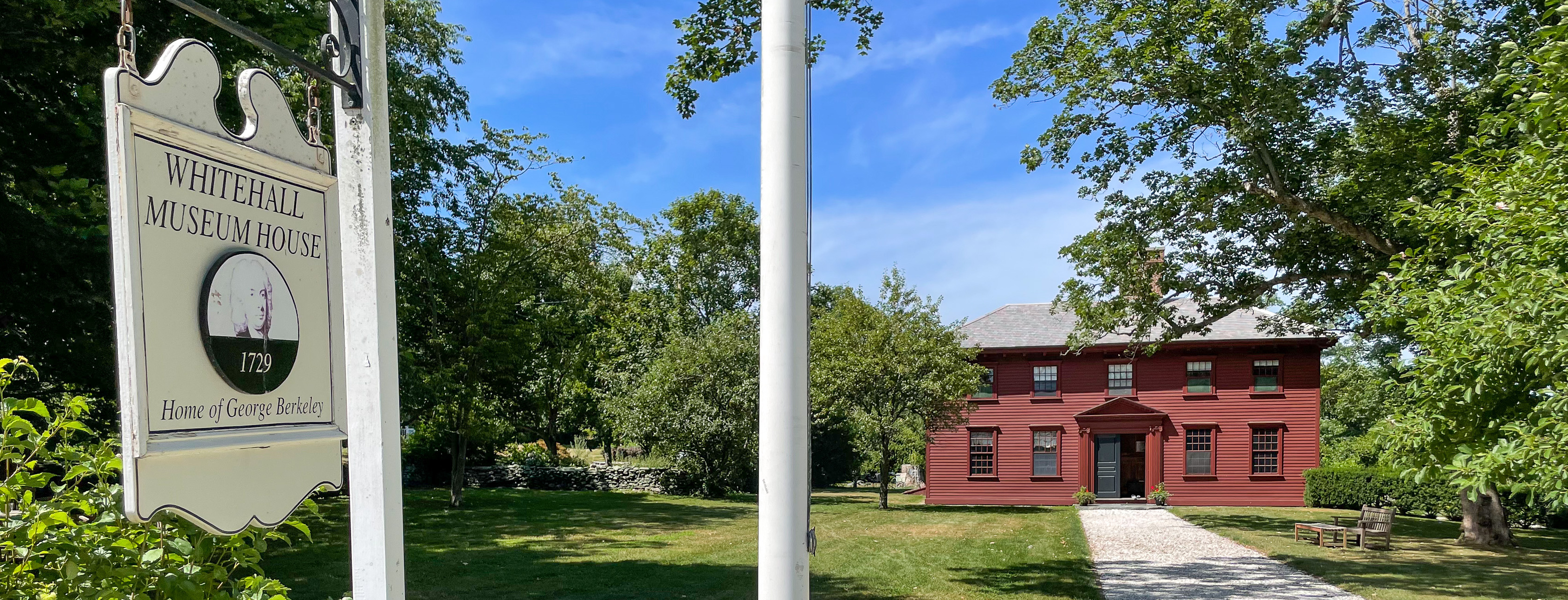
Whitehall Museum House

- Boyd's Windmill, built 1810
- Bailey Farm, built 1838
- Clambake Club of Newport, built in 1895
- Gardiner Pond Shell Midden
- Hamilton Hoppin House, built in 1856
- Lyman C. Joseph House, built 1882
- Norman Bird Sanctuary, central house built c. 1755
- Paradise School, built 1875
- Prescott Farm, c. 1715
- Whitehall (Rhode Island), built 1729
- Witherbee School, built 1900
- Stonybrook Estate, built 1928

== Notable people ==
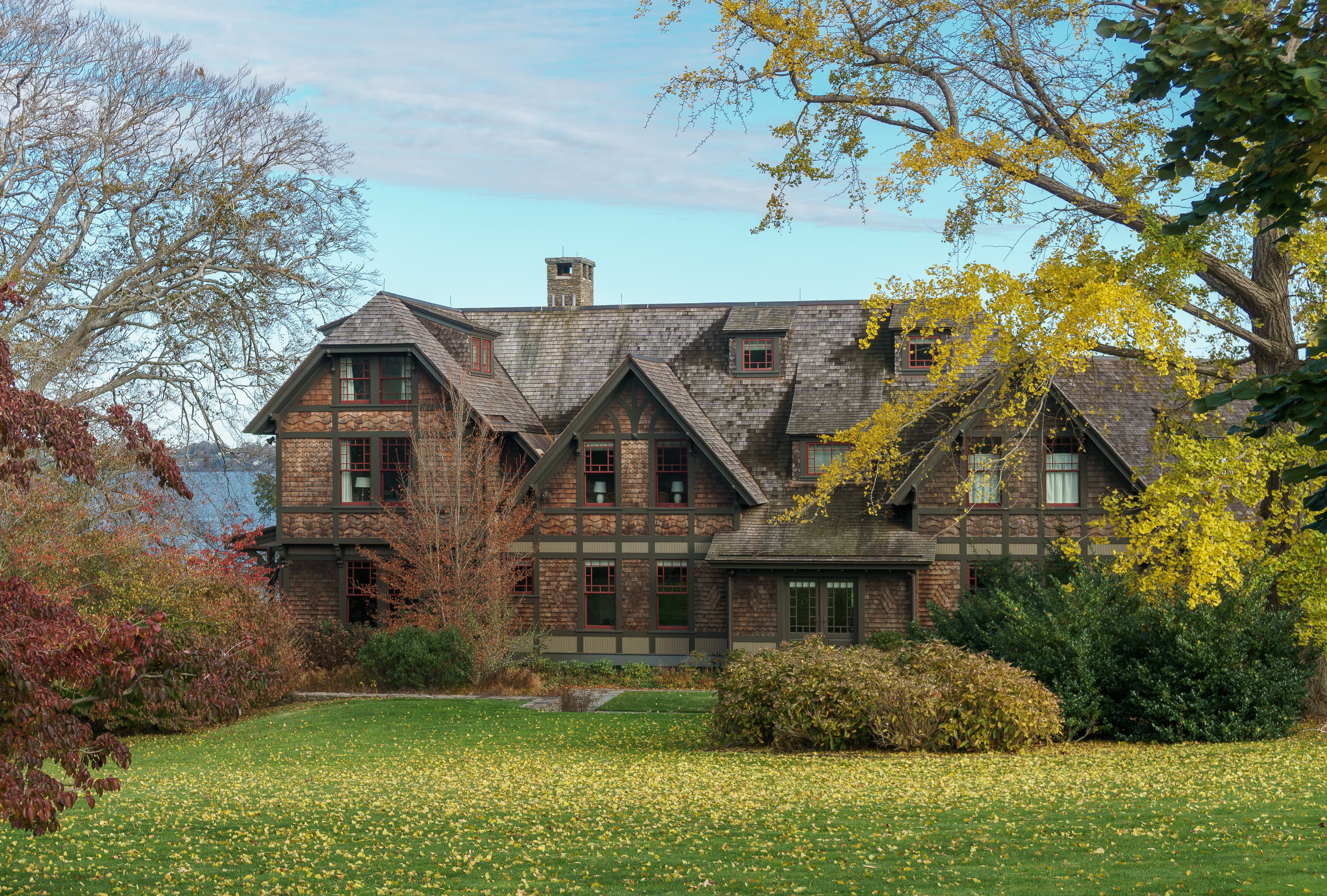
Edwin Booth's summer cottage "Boothden" in Middletown

- Israel T. Almy, Fall River architect, born in Middletown
- George Berkeley (a.k.a. Bishop Berkeley), 18th century Anglo-Irish philosopher, known for his doctrine of immaterialism. He lived in Middletown between 1729 and 1731.
- Edwin Booth, actor. He built summer cottage "Boothden" in Middletown in 1884.
- Nicolas Cage, actor. He once lived in Middletown.
- Bill Cowsill, singer-songwriter, musician and record producer, born in Middletown (1948)
- Charlie Day, actor (It's Always Sunny in Philadelphia), grew up in Middletown
- Charles A. Flynn, retired United States Army General, born in Middleton (1963)
- Michael T. Flynn, retired United States Army Lieutenant General, former National Security Advisor to President Donald Trump and former Director of the Defense Intelligence Agency under President Barack Obama, born in Middletown (1958)
- Richard Hatch, Survivor contestant, grew up in Middletown
- Obadiah Holmes, colonial Baptist minister; ancestor of President Abraham Lincoln. He lived and is buried in a part of Newport annexed to Middletown.
- John Huston, film director, screenwriter and actor (Moulin Rouge (1952), Key Largo). Oscar winner (The Treasure of the Sierra Madre). Died in Middletown (1987).
