= List of elections in 1936 =

The following elections occurred in the year 1936.

== Africa ==
- 1936 Egyptian parliamentary election

== Asia ==
- 1936 Ceylonese State Council election
- 1936–1937 Iraqi parliamentary election
- 1936 Japanese general election
- 1936 Soviet Union legislative election

== Europe ==
- 1936 Belgian general election
- 1936 Bielsko municipal election
- 1936 Danish Landsting election
- 1936 Faroese general election
- 1936 Finnish parliamentary election
- 1936 French legislative election
- 1936 German election and referendum
- 1936 Greek legislative election
- 1936 Lithuanian parliamentary election
- 1936 Norwegian parliamentary election
- 1936 Romanian local elections
- 1936 Spanish general election
- 1936 Spanish presidential election
- 1936 Soviet Union legislative election
- 1936 Swedish general election

=== Liechtenstein ===
- 1936 Liechtenstein general election
- 1936 Liechtenstein local elections

=== United Kingdom ===
- 1936 Balham and Tooting by-election
- 1936 Birmingham Erdington by-election
- 1936 Clay Cross by-election
- 1936 Combined Scottish Universities by-election
- 1936 Derby by-election
- 1936 Dunbartonshire by-election
- 1936 East Grinstead by-election
- 1936 Greenock by-election
- 1936 Lewes by-election
- 1936 Llanelli by-election
- 1936 Peckham by-election
- 1936 Preston by-election
- 1936 Ross and Cromarty by-election

== North America ==
=== Canada ===
- 1936 Conservative Party of Ontario leadership election
- 1936 Edmonton municipal election
- 1936 Manitoba general election
- 1936 Ottawa municipal election
- 1936 Quebec general election
- December 1936 Toronto municipal election
- January 1936 Toronto municipal election

=== Caribbean ===
- 1936 Cuban general election

=== Central America ===
- 1936 Costa Rican general election
- 1936 Honduran Constituent Assembly election
- 1936 Honduran presidential election
- 1936 Nicaraguan general election
- 1936 Nicaraguan presidential election
- 1936 Panamanian general election
- 1936 Salvadoran legislative election

=== United States ===
- 1936 New York state election
- 1936 United States elections
- 1936 United States presidential election

==== United States lieutenant gubernatorial ====
- 1936 Illinois lieutenant gubernatorial election
- 1936 Minnesota lieutenant gubernatorial election
- 1936 Missouri lieutenant gubernatorial election
- 1936 North Carolina lieutenant gubernatorial election
- 1936 Texas lieutenant gubernatorial election
- 1936 Wisconsin lieutenant gubernatorial election

==== United States gubernatorial ====
- 1936 Arizona gubernatorial election
- 1936 Arkansas gubernatorial election
- 1936 Colorado gubernatorial election
- 1936 Connecticut gubernatorial election
- 1936 Delaware gubernatorial election
- 1936 Florida gubernatorial election
- 1936 Georgia gubernatorial election
- 1936 Idaho gubernatorial election
- 1936 Illinois gubernatorial election
- 1936 Indiana gubernatorial election
- 1936 Iowa gubernatorial election
- 1936 Kansas gubernatorial election
- 1936 Louisiana gubernatorial election
- 1936 Maine gubernatorial election
- 1936 Massachusetts gubernatorial election
- 1936 Michigan gubernatorial election
- 1936 Minnesota gubernatorial election
- 1936 Missouri gubernatorial election
- 1936 Montana gubernatorial election
- 1936 Nebraska gubernatorial election
- 1936 New Hampshire gubernatorial election
- 1936 New Mexico gubernatorial election
- 1936 New York gubernatorial election
- 1936 North Carolina gubernatorial election
- 1936 North Dakota gubernatorial election
- 1936 Ohio gubernatorial election
- 1936 Rhode Island gubernatorial election
- 1936 South Dakota gubernatorial election
- 1936 Tennessee gubernatorial election
- 1936 Texas gubernatorial election
- 1936 United States gubernatorial elections
- 1936 Utah gubernatorial election
- 1936 Vermont gubernatorial election
- 1936 Washington gubernatorial election
- 1936 West Virginia gubernatorial election
- 1936 Wisconsin gubernatorial election

==== United States House of Representatives ====
- 1936 United States House of Representatives elections
- 1936 United States House of Representatives elections in California
- 1936 United States House of Representatives elections in South Carolina

==== United States Senate ====
- 1936 United States Senate elections
- 1936 United States Senate election in Alabama
- 1936 United States Senate election in Arkansas
- 1936 United States Senate election in Colorado
- 1936 United States Senate special election in Florida (Class 1)
- 1936 United States Senate election in Georgia
- 1936 United States Senate election in Idaho
- 1936 United States Senate election in Illinois
- 1936 United States Senate election in Iowa
- 1936 United States Senate special election in Iowa
- 1936 United States Senate election in Kansas
- 1936 United States Senate election in Kentucky
- 1936 United States Senate special election in Louisiana
- 1936 United States Senate election in Maine
- 1936 United States Senate election in Massachusetts
- 1936 United States Senate election in Michigan
- 1936 United States Senate election in Minnesota
- 1936 United States Senate special election in Minnesota
- 1936 United States Senate election in Mississippi
- 1936 United States Senate election in Montana
- 1936 United States Senate election in Nebraska
- 1936 United States Senate election in New Hampshire
- 1936 United States Senate election in New Jersey
- 1936 United States Senate election in Oklahoma
- 1936 United States Senate election in South Carolina
- 1936 United States Senate election in South Dakota
- 1936 United States Senate election in Tennessee
- 1936 United States Senate election in Texas
- 1936 United States Senate election in Virginia
- 1936 United States Senate election in Wyoming
- 1936 Auburn, Alabama municipal elections

== South America ==
- 1936 Argentine legislative election
- 1936 Peruvian general election
- 1936 Venezuelan presidential election

== Oceania ==
=== Australia ===
- 1936 Bowen state by-election
- 1936 Darling Downs by-election
- 1936 Goulburn Valley state by-election
- 1936 Kennedy by-election
- 1936 Vaucluse state by-election
- 1936 Western Australian state election

== See also ==
- Category:1936 elections
