= Arthur L. Hardge =

American activist and minister (1927–1983)

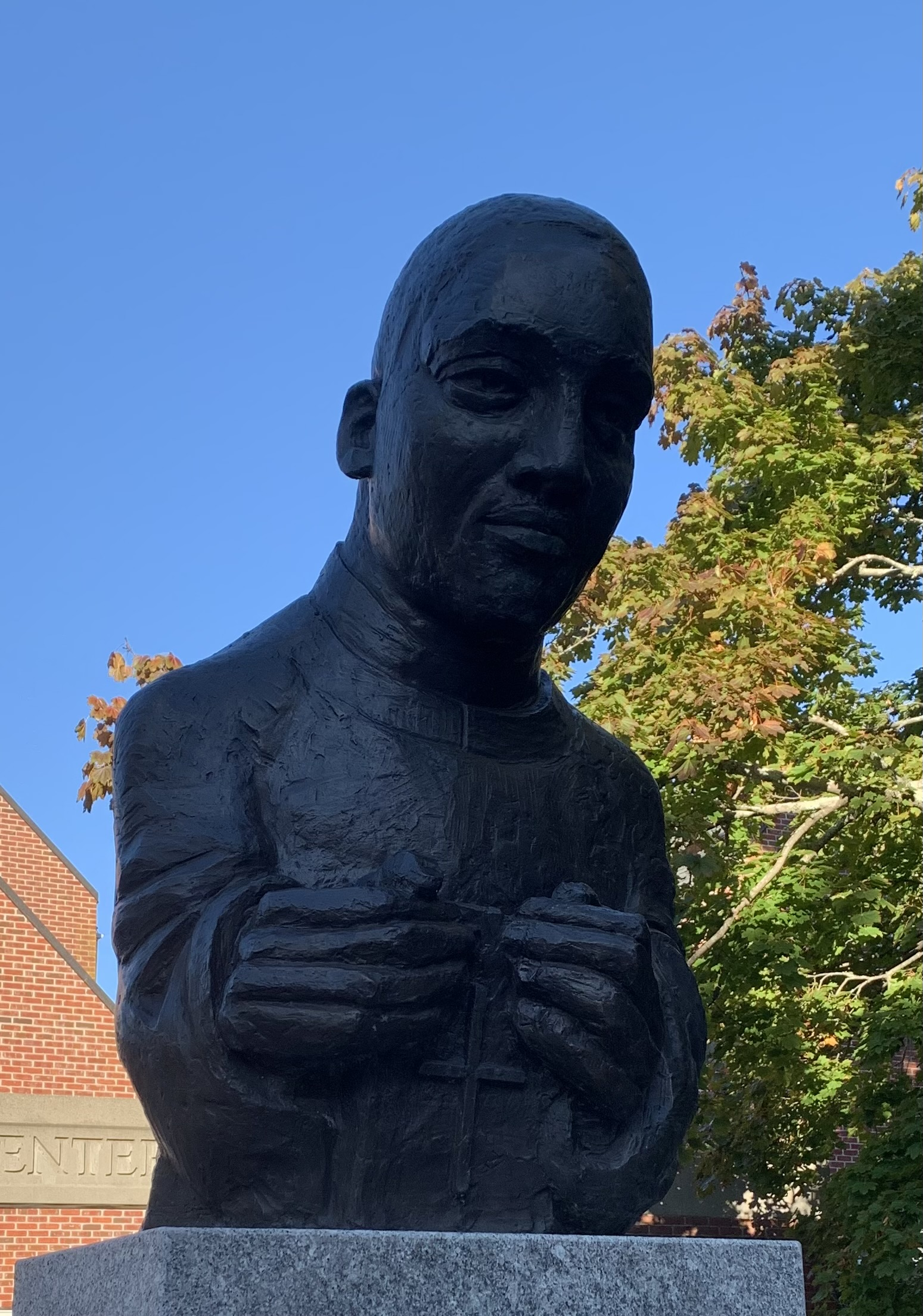
- Statue of Hardge on URI campus
- Born: April 8, 1927; Indianapolis, Indiana, U.S.
- Died: October 29, 1983 (aged 56); Providence, Rhode Island
- Education: Morgan State University; Temple University
- Occupations: Activist, minister, academic administrator
- Employer: University of Rhode Island
- Organization: Congress of Racial Equality

Arthur L. Hardge (April 8, 1927 – October 29, 1983) was an American civil rights movement leader, a minister in the African Methodist Episcopal Zion Church, and a University of Rhode Island administrator. In 1968, he became Rhode Island's first African American cabinet member when Governor John Chafee appointed him to serve as director of the Rhode Island Department of Community Affairs.

== Early life and activism ==
Hardge was born on April 8, 1927, in Indianapolis, Indiana, to Rev. Elias Hardge and Clara Edith (Smith) Hardge. In 1929, the family moved to Jersey City, New Jersey, where Arthur graduated high school. He attended New York University before transferring to Morgan State College in Baltimore, Maryland, where he received a Bachelor of Arts degree. Ordained a minister in the African Methodist Episcopal Zion Church at the age of 17, he received a baccalaureate in sacred theology from the Temple University School of Theology in 1951. He subsequently preached at churches in Oklahoma City and Harlem, Great Neck, and Ithaca, New York. He became pastor of the Durham Memorial AME Zion Church in Buffalo, New York, in 1958, and then pastor of the Union AME Zion church in New Britain, Connecticut, by 1961.

In 1961, Hardge became active in the civil rights movement and a Freedom Rider. After participating in a sit-in at a segregated restaurant located in the Tallahassee Municipal Airport, he and nine other clergymen were sentenced to sixty days on a Florida chain gang. After a lengthy appeals process that reached the U.S. Supreme Court, the men served ten days in jail before a judge ordered their release in 1964.

== Rhode Island career ==
In May 1963, Hardge moved to Providence, Rhode Island, to become the pastor of the Hood Memorial A.M.E. Zion Church. He co-founded and chaired the state chapter of the Congress of Racial Equality and served as executive secretary of the Rhode Island Commission Against Discrimination from 1965 to 1968. He helped to organize sit-ins, legal actions, and legislative pushes to advance fair housing, anti-poverty measures, and school desegregation in Rhode Island. He was instrumental to the passage of the Rhode Island Fair Housing Law. In 1967, Hardge co-founded and chaired the state branch of the Opportunities Industrialization Center (OIC), whose mission is to provide job training and adult education to underprivileged community members. Under Hardge's leadership, the Rhode Island OIC moved into a new 80,000-square-foot facility in South Providence, built at a cost of $6 million.

On July 25, 1968, Hardge became Rhode Island's first African American cabinet member and the first African American to lead a state agency when Governor John Chafee, a liberal Republican like Hardge, appointed him to serve as the first director of the Rhode Island Department of Community Affairs. Governor Frank Licht, a Democrat, unseated Chafee in the 1968 election and did not reappoint Hardge to the cabinet in January 1969.

On June 5, 1969, Hardge became assistant director of the Program for Disadvantaged Youth, based at the University of Rhode Island. The program was intended to promote the pipeline of underprivileged young people, especially racial and ethnic minorities, from high school to college. It facilitated student success while combating racial discrimination on campus. Hardge was promoted to program director in September 1969 and rebranded the program to Special Program for Talent Development (TD). The program grew from only thirteen students to approximately 600 students admitted each year.

Hardge was the University of Rhode Island's first African American administrator. He also served as a special assistant to the president. On September 12, 2000, URI dedicated a memorial statue of Hardge. The black marble statue is located outside the Multicultural Center on URI's Kingston campus.

Hardge died from heart disease in 1983 at the age of 56. His son, Marc Hardge (born 1964), was a talent development coordinator at URI as of 2016.
