= 2026 Rhode Island Attorney General election =

- November 3, 2026
Nominee	Kim Ahern	Alan Gordon
Party	Democratic	Republican
Popular vote	233,803	117,791
Percentage	66.3%	33.4%
Attorney General before election
Peter Neronha
Democratic
Elected Attorney General
Kim Ahern
Democratic

The 2026 Rhode Island Attorney General election was held on November 3, 2026, to elect the Attorney General of Rhode Island. Incumbent Democrat Peter Neronha was term-limited and could not seek re-election.

== Democratic primary ==
=== Candidates ===
==== Nominee ====
- Kim Ahern, former prosecutor and Cannabis Control Commission chair

==== Eliminated in primary ====
- Keith Hoffmann, former chief of policy for Peter Neronha
- Jason Knight, state representative from the 67th district (2017–present)
- Joseph Solomon Jr., state representative from the 22nd district (2015–present)

==== Withdrawn ====
- Robert Craven, state representative from the 32nd district (2013–present)

=== Endorsements ===
Kim Ahern

Statewide officials

- Howard Dean, former governor of Vermont (1991–2003) and chair of the Democratic National Committee (2005–2009)
- Jeffrey Pine, former attorney general of Rhode Island (1993–1999)

State legislators

- 9 current and former state senators (Note: Jake Bissaillon, 1st district (2023–present); Alana DiMario, 36th district (2021–present); Meghan Kallman, 15th district (2021–present); Melissa Murray, 24th district (2019–present); Donna Nesselbush, former 15th district (2011–2021); Rhoda Perry, former 3rd district (1991–2012); Bridget Valverde, 35th district (2019–present); Lammis Vargas, 28th district (2025–present); Myrth York, former 2nd district (1991–1995) and nominee for governor in 1994, 1998, and 2002)
- 4 current and former state representatives (Note: Edith Ajello, 1st district (1993–present); Karen Alzate, 60th district (2019–present); Linda Kushner, former 4th district (1983–1993) and nominee for U.S. Senate in 1994; Teresa Tanzi, 34th district (2011–present))

Local officials

- Christopher Beauchamp, mayor of Woonsocket (2023–present)
- Joseph Polisena Jr., mayor of Johnston (2023–present)

Labor unions

- Ironworkers Local 37
- United Association Local 51
- United Nurses and Allied Professionals

Organizations

- EMILYs List
- LGBTQ Victory Fund
- LPAC
- Vote Mama PAC
Keith Hoffman

National Leaders

- Elizabeth Warren, U.S. Senator, Massachusetts (2013–present)
- Karl Racine, former attorney general for the District of Columbia

Statewide officials

- Peter Neronha, attorney general of Rhode Island (2019–present)
- James O'Neil, former attorney general of Rhode Island

Local officials

- Jeffrey Mutter, Mayor of Cumberland (2019–present)

Labor unions

- Rhode Island Federation of Teachers and Health Professionals
- SEIU Local 1199NE
- IUPAT District Council 11

Organizations

- Cumberland Democratic Town Committee
- Lincoln Democratic Town Committee
- Save Democracy PAC
- Climate Action Rhode Island
- Cranston Forward
Joseph Solomon

State legislators

- David Tikoian, state senator from the 22nd district (2023–present)

Local officials

- Frank Picozzi, Mayor of Warwick (2021–present)

Labor unions

- International Brotherhood of Police Officers
- National Association of Government Employees
- Rhode Island State Association of Fire Fighters
- Rhode Island Troopers Association

Organizations

- Rhode Island Fraternal Order of Police
Declined to endorse

Party officials

- Liz Beretta-Perik, chair of the Rhode Island Democratic Party (2023–2026)

Political parties

- Rhode Island Democratic Party

=== Polling ===
Poll source	Date(s) administered	Sample size (Note: Key: A – all adults RV – registered voters LV – likely voters V – unclear)	Margin of error	Kimberly Ahern	Keith Hoffmann	Jason Knight	Joseph Solomon Jr.	Other	Undecided
University of New Hampshire	August 20–24, 2026	422 (LV)	± 4.6%	16%	20%	7%	12%	–	46%
Emerson College/WPRI-TV	August 21–22, 2026	528 (LV)	± 4.2%	24%	18%	9%	14%	–	35%
Embold Research (Note: Poll sponsored by Pell Center for International Relations and Public Policy.)	August 3–11, 2026	(LV)	—	23%	13%	5%	10%	3% (Note: "Would not vote" with 3%)	46%
Emerson College/WPRI-TV	May 14–16, 2026	565 (LV)	± 4.1%	9%	5%	5%	9%	–	72%

=== Debates ===
2026 Rhode Island Attorney General election Democratic primary debates
No.	Date	Host	Moderator	Link	Democratic	Democratic	Democratic	Democratic
Key: P Participant A Absent N Not invited I Invited W Withdrawn								
Key: P Participant A Absent N Not invited I Invited W Withdrawn					Kimberly Ahern	Keith Hoffmann	Jason Knight	Joseph J. Solomon Jr.
1	Aug. 11, 2026	WPRI-TV	Ted Nesi; Tim White	YouTube	P	P	P	P
2	Aug. 14, 2026	WJAR	Gene Valicenti	YouTube	P	P	P	P

=== Results ===
Primary results by municipality: Ahern: 30–40%; 40–50%; Hoffmann: 30–40%; 40–50%; 50–60%; Solomon: 30–40%; Knight: 30–40%

Democratic primary results
Party	Candidate	Votes	%
Democratic	Kimberly Ahern	46,025	36.3
Democratic	Keith Hoffmann	41,908	33.1
Democratic	Joseph Solomon Jr.	25,901	20.4
Democratic	Jason Knight	12,884	10.2
Total votes		126,718	100.0

== Republican primary ==
=== Candidates ===
==== Nominee ====
- Alan Gordon, Compassion Party nominee for attorney general in 2018

=== Results ===
Republican primary results
Party	Candidate	Votes	%
Republican	Alan Gordon	20,288	100.0
Total votes		20,288	100.0

== General election ==
=== Predictions ===
Source	Ranking	As of
Sabato's Crystal Ball	Safe D	August 21, 2025

==== Polling ====
Poll source	Date(s) administered	Sample size	Margin of error	Kimberly Ahern (D)	Alan Leonard Gordon (R)	Undecided
Embold Research	October 5–8, 2026	815 (LV)	± 3.6%	52%	34%	13%

=== Results ===
2026 Rhode Island Attorney General election
Party	Candidate	Votes	%	±%
Democratic	Kimberly Ahern			
Republican	Alan Leonard Gordon			
Write-in				
Total votes			100.0	

== See also ==
- Rhode Island Attorney General

== Notes ==
Partisan clients
