= Richard J. Israel (politician) =

American attorney and politician

Attorney General of Rhode Island
- In office 1971–1975
- Governor: Frank Licht; Philip Noel
- Preceded by: Herbert F. DeSimone
- Succeeded by: Julius C. Michaelson

Personal details
- Born: Richard Jerome Israel; December 9, 1930 Slatersville, Rhode Island, U.S.
- Died: November 7, 2022 (aged 91)
- Party: Republican
- Education: Brown University; Yale Law School

Richard Jerome Israel (December 9, 1930 – November 7, 2022) was an American attorney and politician. He served as attorney general of Rhode Island from 1971 till 1975.

== Life and career ==
Israel was born in Slatersville, Rhode Island. He attended Classical High School, Brown University and Yale Law School.

Israel served as attorney general of Rhode Island from 1971 to 1975.

Israel died on November 7, 2022, at the age of 91.

Party political offices
Preceded by Herbert F. DeSimone	Republican nominee for Attorney General of Rhode Island; 1970, 1972, 1974	Succeeded by Marvin A. Brill
