= 1982 United States Senate election in Rhode Island =

- November 2, 1982
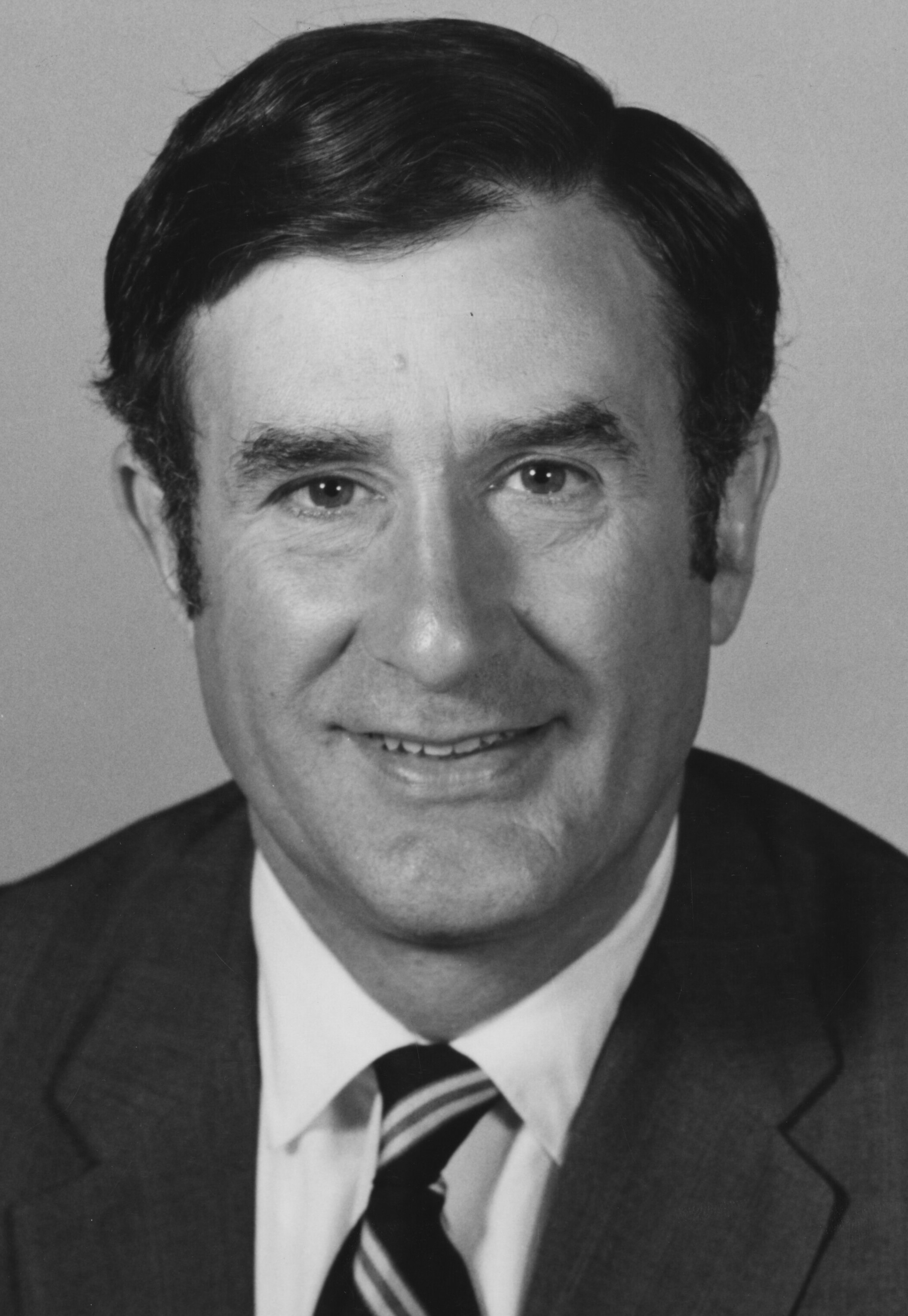

Nominee	John Chafee	Julius Michaelson
Party	Republican	Democratic
Popular vote	175,495	167,283
Percentage	51.20%	48.80%
- Chafee: 50–60% 60–70% 70–80% Michaelson: 50–60% 60–70%
U.S. senator before election
John Chafee
Republican
Elected U.S. Senator
John Chafee
Republican

The 1982 United States Senate election in Rhode Island took place on November 2, 1982. Incumbent Republican Senator John Chafee successfully sought re-election to a second term, very narrowly defeating Democrat Julius C. Michaelson.

== Republican primary ==
=== Candidates ===
- John Chafee

== Democratic primary ==
=== Candidates ===
- Julius C. Michaelson, former Attorney General of Rhode Island
- Helen E. Flynn

=== Results ===
Democratic primary results
Party	Candidate	Votes	%
Democratic	Julius C. Michaelson	56,800	82.37
Democratic	Helen E. Flynn	12,159	17.63
Majority		44,641	64.74%
Total votes		68,959	100.00

== General election ==
=== Results ===
Republican Chafee was re-elected but received a lower percentage of the vote than in 1976. Michaelson had better name recognition than Chafee's previous opponent. Michaelson won Providence County, the state's most populous county, but Chafee was still able to win the state. This was the closest election of his career.

General election results
Party	Candidate	Votes	%
Republican	John Chafee (inc.)	175,495	51.20
Democratic	Julius C. Michaelson	167,283	48.80
Majority		8,212	2.40
Total votes		342,778	100.00
Republican hold			

== See also ==
- 1982 United States Senate elections
