= 1972 Rhode Island gubernatorial election =

- November 7, 1972
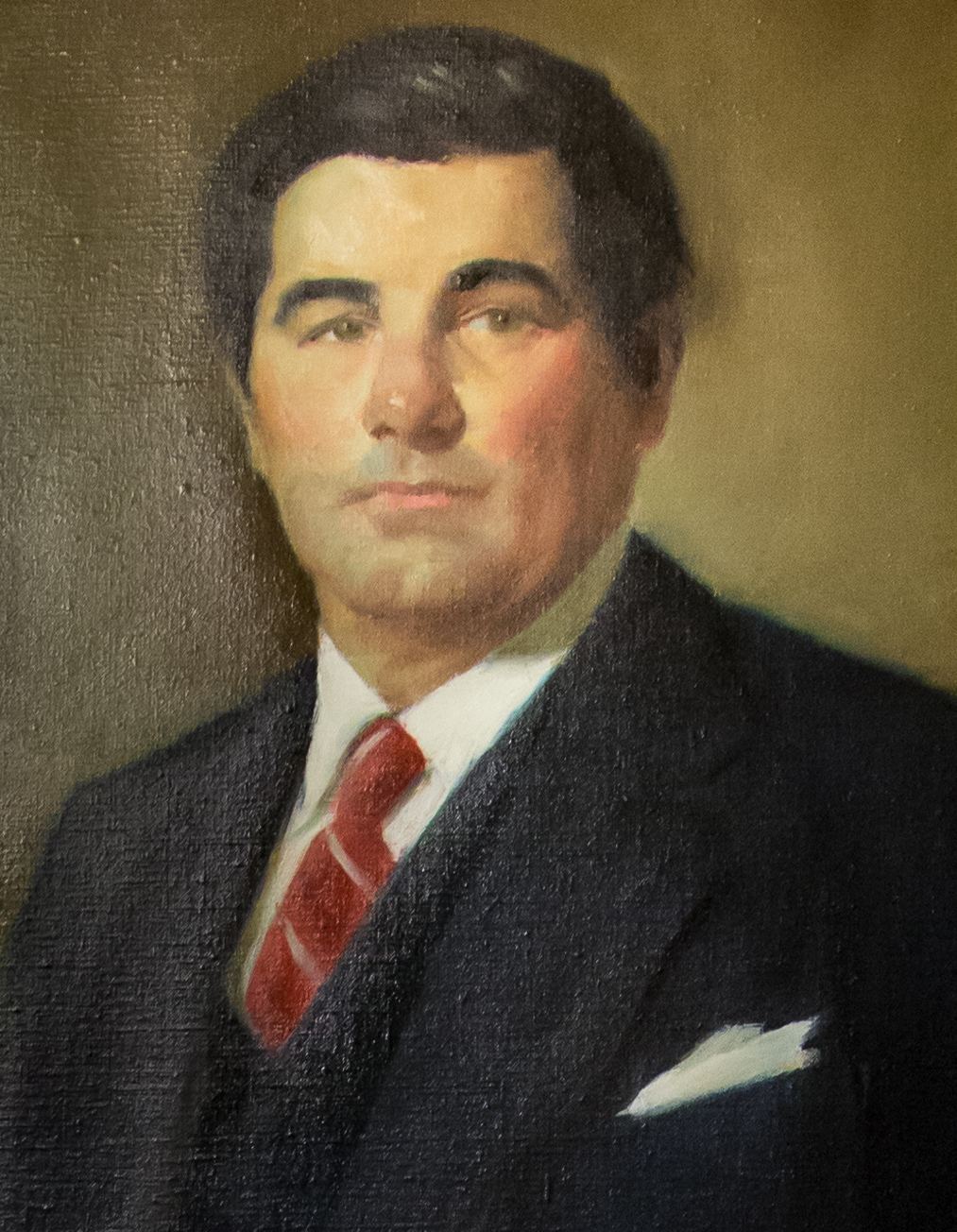

Nominee	Philip Noel	Herbert DeSimone
Party	Democratic	Republican
Popular vote	216,953	194,315
Percentage	52.55%	47.07%
- Noel: 50–60% 60–70% DeSimone: 40–50% 50–60%
Governor before election
Frank Licht
Democratic
Elected Governor
Philip Noel
Democratic

The 1972 Rhode Island gubernatorial election was held on November 7, 1972. Democratic nominee Philip Noel defeated Republican nominee Herbert F. DeSimone with 52.55% of the vote.

== General election ==
=== Candidates ===
Major party candidates

- Herbert F. DeSimone, Republican
- Philip Noel, Democratic

Other candidates

- Adam J. Varone, Independent

=== Results ===
1972 Rhode Island gubernatorial election
Party	Candidate	Votes	%	±%
Democratic	Philip Noel	216,953	52.55%	
Republican	Herbert F. DeSimone	194,315	47.07%	
Independent	Adam J. Varone	1,597	0.39%	
Majority		22,638		
Turnout		412,866		
Democratic hold		Swing		

==== By county ====
	Phillip Noel Democratic		Herbert DiSimone Republican		Adam Varone Independent	
County	Votes	%	Votes	%	Votes	%
Bristol	11,247	51.7%	10,449	48.0%	69	0.3%
Kent	35,518	50.8%	34,149	48.9%	223	0.3%
Newport	17,350	55.7%	13,752	44.1%	70	0.2%
Providence	137,497	53.4%	119,060	46.2%	1,093	0.4%
Washington	15,341	47.4%	16,905	52.2%	142	0.4%

Counties that flipped from Republican to Democratic

- Bristol
- Kent
- Newport
