= 1970 Rhode Island gubernatorial election =

- November 3, 1970
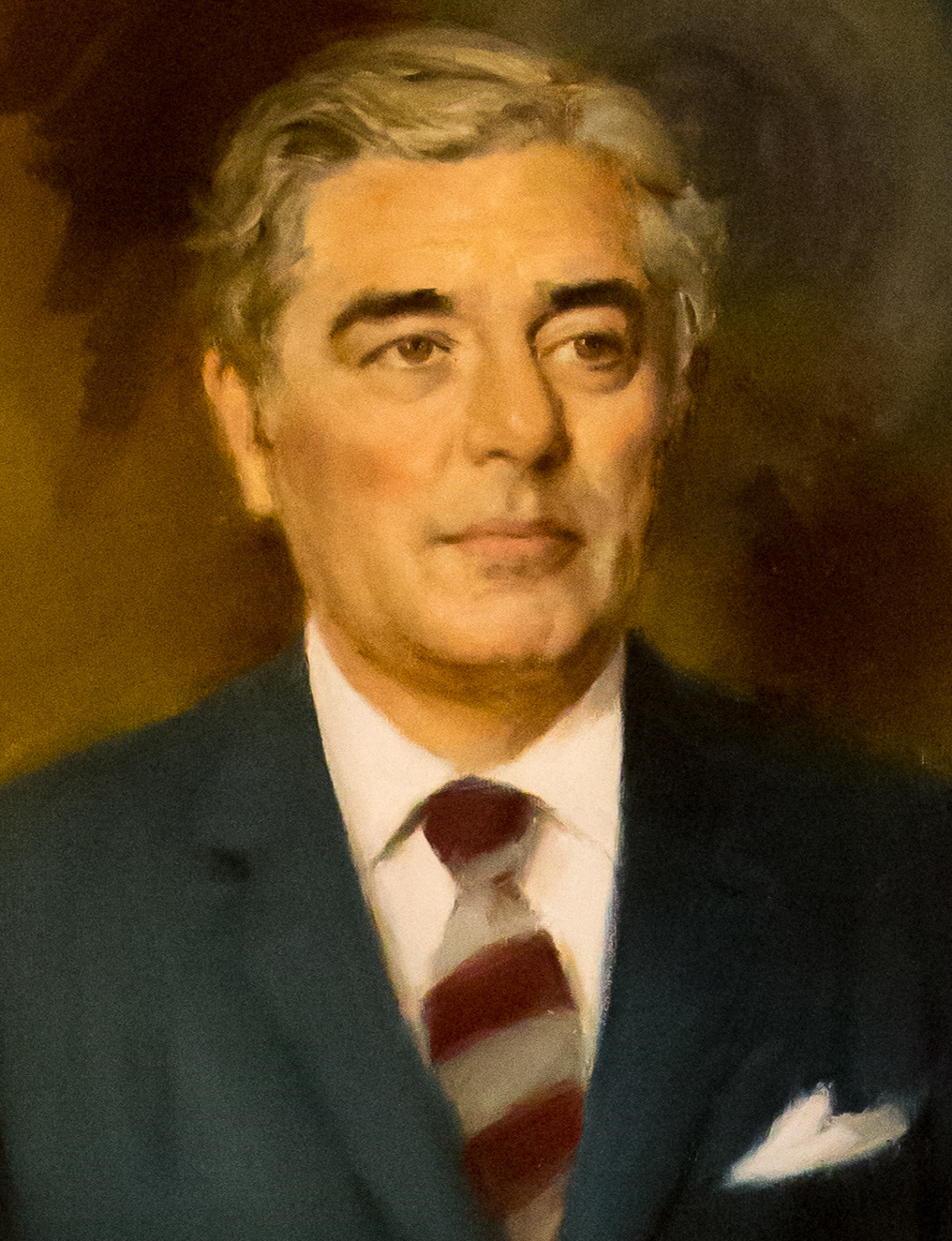

Nominee	Frank Licht	Herbert DeSimone
Party	Democratic	Republican
Popular vote	173,420	171,549
Percentage	50.07%	49.53%
- Licht: 50–60% DeSimone: 50–60% 60–70% 70–80%
Governor before election
Frank Licht
Democratic
Elected Governor
Frank Licht
Democratic

The 1970 Rhode Island gubernatorial election was held on November 3, 1970. Incumbent Democrat Frank Licht very narrowly defeated Republican nominee Herbert F. DeSimone with 50.07% of the vote.

== Primary elections ==
Primary elections were held on September 15, 1970.

=== Republican primary ===
==== Candidates ====
- Herbert F. DeSimone, Attorney General of Rhode Island
- Raymond W. Monaco

==== Results ====
Republican primary results
Party	Candidate	Votes	%
Republican	Herbert F. DeSimone	11,826	95.99
Republican	Raymond W. Monaco	494	4.01
Total votes		12,320	100.00

== General election ==
=== Candidates ===
Major party candidates

- Frank Licht, Democratic
- Herbert F. DeSimone, Republican

Other candidates

- John E. Powers, Independent

=== Results ===
1970 Rhode Island gubernatorial election
Party	Candidate	Votes	%	±%
Democratic	Frank Licht (incumbent)	173,420	50.07%	
Republican	Herbert F. DeSimone	171,549	49.53%	
Socialist Workers	John E. Powers	1,372	0.40%	
Majority		1,871		
Turnout		346,342		
Democratic hold		Swing		

==== By county ====
	Frank Licht Democratic		Herbert DiSimone Republican		John Powers Socialist Workers	
County	Votes	%	Votes	%	Votes	%
Bristol	8,290	46.6%	9,452	53.1%	45	0.3%
Kent	27,075	47.7%	29,513	52.0%	187	0.3%
Newport	11,473	47.5%	12,562	52.0%	106	0.4%
Providence	114,853	51.5%	107,269	48.1%	918	0.4%
Washington	11,729	47.7%	12,753	51.8%	116	0.5%
