= Benjamin M. McLyman =

American politician

58th Attorney General of Rhode Island
- In office 1931–1933
- Governor: Norman S. Case
- Preceded by: Oscar L. Heltzen
- Succeeded by: John Patrick Hartigan

Personal details
- Born: Benjamin M. McLyman; May 4, 1886 Newport, Rhode Island
- Died: December 1, 1975 (aged 89) Providence, Rhode Island
- Party: Republican
- Education: Brown University (BA); Harvard Law School (LLB)

Benjamin M. McLyman (May 4, 1886 - December 1, 1975) was an American politician who served as the Attorney General of Rhode Island from 1931 to 1933.
