= 2022 Rhode Island Attorney General election =

- November 8, 2022
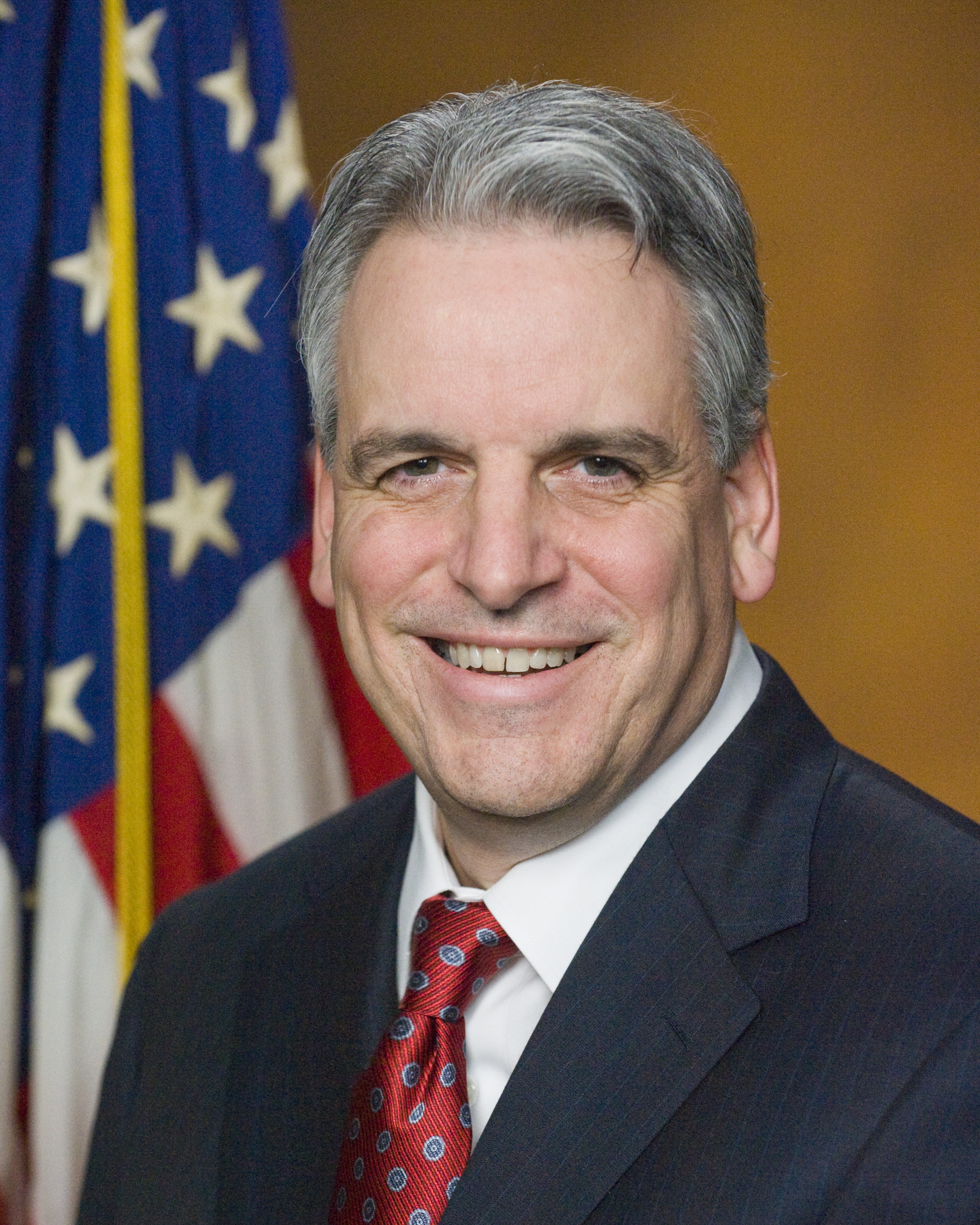

Nominee	Peter Neronha	Charles Calenda
Party	Democratic	Republican
Popular vote	217,066	135,471
Percentage	61.49%	38.38%
- Neronha: 50–60% 60–70% 70–80% 80–90% Calenda: 50–60%

The 2022 Rhode Island Attorney General election took place on November 8, 2022, to elect the Attorney General of Rhode Island. Incumbent Democratic Attorney General Peter Neronha won re-election to a second term.

== Democratic primary ==
=== Candidates ===
==== Nominee ====
- Peter Neronha, incumbent Attorney General

==== Endorsements ====
Peter Neronha

Organizations

- Rhode Island Democratic Party

=== Results ===
Democratic primary results
Party	Candidate	Votes	%
Democratic	Peter Neronha	94,665	100.0
Total votes		94,665	100.0%

== Republican primary ==
=== Candidates ===
==== Nominee ====
- Charles "Chas" Calenda, former assistant attorney general

=== Results ===
Republican primary results
Party	Candidate	Votes	%
Republican	Charles "Chas" Calenda	18,557	100.0
Total votes		18,557	100.0%

== General election ==
=== Forum ===
2022 Rhode Island Attorney General candidate forum
No.	Date	Host	Moderator	Link	Democratic	Republican
Key: P Participant A Absent N Not invited I Invited W Withdrawn						
Key: P Participant A Absent N Not invited I Invited W Withdrawn					Peter Neronha	Charles Calenda
1		North Kingstown; High School		YouTube	P	P

=== Predictions ===
Source	Ranking	As of
Sabato's Crystal Ball	Safe D	September 14, 2022
Elections Daily	Safe D	November 1, 2022

=== Results ===
2022 Rhode Island Attorney General election
Party	Candidate	Votes	%	±%
Democratic	Peter Neronha (incumbent)	217,066	61.49%	−18.34%
Republican	Charles Calenda	135,471	38.38%	N/A
Write-in		460	0.13%	-0.93%
Total votes		352,997	100.0%	
Democratic hold				

==== By county ====
	Peter Neronha Democratic		Charles Calenda Republican		Others	
County	Votes	%	Votes	%	Votes	%
Bristol	13,215	65.02%	7,090	34.88%	20	0.1%
Kent	37,675	55.65%	29,931	44.21%	92	0.14%
Newport	20,990	65.68%	10,945	34.25%	21	0.07%
Providence	109,938	62.84%	64,730	37.0%	287	0.16%
Washington	35,248	60.71%	22,775	39.22%	40	0.07%

==== By congressional district ====
Neronha won both congressional districts.

District	Neronha	Calenda	Representative
1st	66%	34%	David Cicilline
2nd	58%	42%	James Langevin (117th Congress)
2nd	58%	42%	Seth Magaziner (118th Congress)

== See also ==
- Rhode Island Attorney General
