= Kim Ahern =

American politician

Attorney General-elect of Rhode Island
- Assuming office January 2027
- Governor: Helena Foulkes (elect)
- Succeeding: Peter Neronha

Personal details
- Born: Kimberly Renee Ahern; 1983 or 1984 (age 42–43)
- Party: Democratic
- Education: Providence College (BS); Roger Williams University (JD)

Kimberly Renee "Kim" Ahern (born 1983/1984) is an American prosecutor and politician. She is Attorney General-elect of Rhode Island.

== Early life and education ==
Ahern grew up in Virginia. Her mother worked with the United States Department of State while her father served in the United States Army. At 18, Ahern moved to Rhode Island so she could attend Providence College, where she graduated magna cum laude. She later attended Roger Williams University, serving from 2008 to 2009 as editor-in-chief of the law review, and graduated with a Juris Doctor degree.

== Career ==
Ahern worked as a law clerk for Maureen McKenna Goldberg, a justice of the Rhode Island Supreme Court.

In 2010, she became a prosecutor in Rhode Island, working largely for the Special Victims Unit, "involving domestic violence, sexual assault, human trafficking and murder". She was a special assistant attorney general for three successive Rhode Island Attorneys General: Patrick Lynch, Peter Kilmartin, and Peter Neronha, holding this role until 2019. Afterwards, she worked as a deputy counsel for Governor Gina Raimondo and later deputy chief of staff for Governor Dan McKee.

Ahern was appointed by McKee as Chair of the Rhode Island Cannabis Control Commission in 2023.

== 2026 Rhode Island Attorney General campaign ==
In October 2025, she resigned in order to enter the 2026 Rhode Island Attorney General election as a member of the Democratic Party. She won the Democratic primary with 36.3% of the vote, competing against three others. In the general election, Ahern defeated Republican candidate Alan Gordon in the November 3, 2026 general election.

== Personal life ==
Ahern married Jenna Lafayette, whom she met at Providence College, in 2012. They have three daughters.

Political offices
Preceded by Peter Neronha	Attorney General of Rhode Island; Taking office 2027	Elect
