= Herbert F. DeSimone =

American lawyer

Assistant Secretary of Transportation for the Environment and Urban System
- In office 1971–1972
- Appointed by: Richard Nixon

64th Attorney General of Rhode Island
- In office 1967–1971
- Governor: John Chafee; Frank Licht
- Preceded by: J. Joseph Nugent
- Succeeded by: Richard J. Israel

Personal details
- Born: September 5, 1929 Providence, Rhode Island, U.S.
- Died: November 27, 2013 (aged 84) Providence, Rhode Island, U.S.
- Resting place: St. Francis Cemetery; Pawtucket, Rhode Island
- Party: Republican
- Spouse: Sally Reynolds DeSimone
- Children: Herbert DeSimone; Douglas DeSimone; Deborah DeSimone
- Parent(s): Florie DeSimone; Lena (Capuano) DeSimone
- Education: La Salle Academy; Brown University; Columbia University Law School
- Profession: Attorney; Politician

Herbert F. DeSimone (September 5, 1929 – November 27, 2013) was an American lawyer and politician from Rhode Island. He served as the 64th attorney general of Rhode Island and as President Nixon's assistant secretary of transportation for the environment and urban system.

== Early life ==
DeSimone was born in Providence, Rhode Island, the only child of Florie DeSimone and Lena (Capuano) DeSimone. He attended La Salle Academy before graduating from Brown University in 1951. While at Brown, DeSimone played college football and was defensive tackle for the 1949 team that was inducted into the Brown University Hall of Fame.

In 1954, he received his law degree from Columbia University Law School and was admitted to the Rhode Island bar. He began the practice of law in Rhode Island.

== Political career ==
As a Republican, DeSimone served as Attorney General of Rhode Island from 1967-1971. He was the 1970 Republican nominee for Governor of Rhode Island but lost the election to Frank Licht. Shortly after his defeat, President Richard Nixon nominated DeSimone to be assistant secretary of the United States Department of Transportation for Environment and Urban System. He served in that position from 1971 to 1972. In 1972 he ran for Governor of Rhode Island again against Philip W. Noel, and was defeated. He then returned to the private practice of law.

In August 1976, President Gerald Ford nominated DeSimone to succeed Edward William Day as judge for the United States District Court for the District of Rhode Island but United States Senator Edward Kennedy blocked the nomination.

In 1985, DeSimone was appointed Director of the Rhode Island Department of Transportation by Governor Edward D. DiPrete. He also served as Director of the Providence Industrial Development Corporation and General Counsel for the Rhode Island Housing and Finance Corporation.

In 2002, he was awarded the Neil J. Houston Award for contributions to the Criminal Justice systems and Public Interest. He was also awarded Man of the Year by Engineering News Record and Man of the Year by the Italo-American Club of Rhode Island.

DeSimone was a longtime advisor and mentor to Providence Mayor Buddy Cianci. Cianci started his career in DeSimone's Attorney General office, and worked on DeSimone's 1970 and 1972 gubernatorial campaigns. DeSimone was present at Cianci's home the night in March 1983 when Cianci was accused of beating Raymond DeLeo. DeSimone testified in Cianci's trial, in which Cianci pleaded no contest to assault and assault with a dangerous weapon.

== Personal life ==
DeSimone and his wife Sally Reynolds DeSimone had three children: Herbert DeSimone, Douglas DeSimone and Deborah DeSimone.

DeSimone died in Providence, Rhode Island on November 27, 2013.

Legal offices
Preceded by J. Joseph Nugent	Attorney General of Rhode Island; 1967–1971	Succeeded by Richard J. Israel
Party political offices
Preceded by Bruce M. Selya	Republican nominee for Attorney General of Rhode Island; 1966, 1968	Succeeded by Richard J. Israel
Preceded by John Chafee	Republican nominee for Governor of Rhode Island; 1970, 1972	Succeeded by James W. Nugent
