= Arlene Violet =

First elected female state Attorney General

Attorney General of Rhode Island
- In office January 1, 1985 – January 1987
- Governor: Edward D. DiPrete
- Preceded by: Dennis Roberts
- Succeeded by: James O'Neil

Personal details
- Born: 1943 (age 82–83) Providence, Rhode Island, U.S.
- Party: Republican (formerly); Independent
- Education: Providence College; Salve Regina University (BA); Boston College (JD)

Arlene Violet (born 1943) is an American politician. She was a religious sister in the Sisters of Mercy and Attorney General of Rhode Island 1985–1987. She was the first female Attorney General elected in the United States.

== Biography ==
Arlene Violet was born into a middle class Republican–voting family in Providence, Rhode Island. After attending Providence College, she entered Sisters of Mercy convent in 1961, taking her final vows in 1969. Violet said she joined the convent because "I wanted to do something with my life and try to make a difference, and I saw nuns as the people who could make that difference."

Violet later earned a bachelor's degree from Salve Regina University and was a school teacher in a disadvantaged neighborhood in the early 1970s. Becoming interested in law, she enrolled at Boston College Law School, graduating in 1974. During her schooling, she clerked in the judge's chambers and did an internship in the Rhode Island Attorney General's Office. Due to financial difficulties at the convent, she left her legal work and returned to the convent, serving as an administrative nun through the early 1980s.

== Attorney General of Rhode Island ==
In 1982 she ran unsuccessfully for Attorney General. But when she ran again in 1984, Violet won the election, becoming the first elected female attorney general in the United States. During her time in office she focused on organized crime, environmental issues, and victims’ rights. She also pushed for banking reform.

=== RISDIC ===
Shortly after taking office in 1984 Violet learned that the Rhode Island Share and Deposit Indemnity Corporation (RISDIC), a government chartered but private (similar to Amtrak) insurance fund meant to protect the state banking system, was "woefully underfunded" with only $25 million in reserves. She found that RISDIC was making loans to politically connected people without any personal guarantees. Violet pushed for legislation to require Rhode Island banks to be federally insured, but this was voted down. Violet warned that the banking system in Rhode Island was "a house of cards." Four years later, Rhode Island faced a run on the banks, and in January 1991, newly elected Governor Bruce Sundlun declared a bank emergency.

=== Other achievements ===
One of her innovations was to use videotape interviews of child victims rather than direct testimony. She also won recognition for reopening the Von Bülow case.

Violet lost her reelection bid in 1986 and her term ended.

== Life after politics ==
After leaving office, Violet returned to prosecuting, taught environmental law at Brown University, ran a talk show on WHJJ Radio from 1990 to 2006, and writes a weekly political column. She has written two books Convictions: My Journey from the Convent to the Courtroom (1988), an autobiography, and The Mob and Me (2010) a book about the witness protection program. She also drafted a manual on search seizure law. She was inducted into the Rhode Island Heritage Hall of Fame in 1996.

She wrote a musical, The Family, A Musical Drama About the Mob, with composer and lyricist, Enrico Garzilli, which premiered by special arrangement with Trinity Repertory Company in Providence, RI in June 2011.

== See also ==
- List of female state attorneys general in the United States

== Bibliography ==
- Weatherford, Doris (2012). Women in American Politics: History and Milestones. Los Angeles, California: CQ Press. ISBN 978-1-60871-007-2.

Party political offices
| Preceded by Ronald J. Perillo | Republican nominee for Attorney General of Rhode Island; 1982, 1984, 1986 | Succeeded by Kathleen Voccola |
Political offices
| Preceded by Dennis Roberts | Attorney General of Rhode Island; 1985–1987 | Succeeded by James O'Neil |
