= Julius C. Michaelson =

American politician

66th Attorney General of Rhode Island
- In office 1975–1979
- Governor: Philip Noel; J. Joseph Garrahy
- Preceded by: Richard J. Israel
- Succeeded by: Dennis J. Roberts II

Personal details
- Born: January 25, 1922
- Died: November 12, 2011 (aged 89)
- Party: Democratic
- Education: Boston University

Julius Cooley Michaelson (January 25, 1922 – November 12, 2011) served as Rhode Island Attorney General from 1975 to 1979 and was the Democratic U.S. Senate nominee in 1982 against Republican John Chafee.

Julius Cooley Michaelson was born in Salem, Massachusetts to Carl and Celia (née Cooley) Michaelson. During the Second World War, he entered the U.S. Army in 1943 as a Private and was released in 1946 as a First Lieutenant. Michaelson earned his Juris Doctor from Boston University school of Law in 1947 and later received a Master's degree in Philosophy from Brown University in 1967. His public service career began in 1957 as public counsel in public utility rate cases. In 1962, Michaelson was elected to the State Senate and served until 1974. He was the Deputy Majority Leader during the 1969 session.

In 1974, he won the State Attorney General election with 53% of the vote against the incumbent Richard J. Israel. Michaelson won his second term in the 1976 state Attorney-General election with over 71% of the vote against Republican candidate Marvin A. Brill. In 1982 Michaelson challenged incumbent Republican U.S. Senator John Chafee, garnering 49% to Chafee's 51%.

In 2002, Michaelson was inducted into the Rhode Island Heritage Hall of Fame as a "champion for human, civil and labour rights".

He died on November 12, 2011. At the order of Rhode Island Governor Lincoln Chafee, son of former Senator John Chafee, state flags were flown at half-staff in his memory.

== See also ==
- List of Jewish American jurists

Party political offices
Preceded by Dominic F. Cresto	Democratic nominee for Attorney General of Rhode Island; 1974, 1976	Succeeded by Dennis J. Roberts II
Preceded by Richard Lorber	Democratic nominee for U.S. Senator from Rhode Island (Class 1); 1982	Succeeded by Richard A. Licht
Legal offices
Preceded by Richard J. Israel	Attorney General of Rhode Island; 1975–1979	Succeeded by Dennis J. Roberts II
