= Herbert L. Carpenter =

Attorney General of Rhode Island from 1923 to 1925

Attorney General of Rhode Island
- In office 1923–1925
- Governor: William S. Flynn
- Preceded by: Herbert A. Rice
- Succeeded by: Charles P. Sisson

Personal details
- Born: September 2, 1878; Mendon, Massachusetts
- Died: After 1925
- Political party: Democratic
- Spouse: Gertrude Woodworth
- Children: 1

Herbert L. Carpenter (fl. September 2, 1878 – 1925) was an American lawyer and politician who served as the attorney general of Rhode Island from 1923 to 1925. He was a member of the Democratic Party. He served under Governor William S. Flynn.

== Life ==
Herbert L. Carpenter was born on September 2, 1878, in Mendon, Massachusetts. He graduated from Boston University School of Law in 1901, and became a member of the Massachusetts House of Representatives in January of 1905. In 1923, Carpenter was elected as the attorney general of Rhode Island, a position he would hold for the next two years until 1925, when he was replaced by Charles P. Sisson. It is unknown when Carpenter died, as there do not exist any records about his life after his term as attorney general ended. He was married to Gertrude Woodworth, with whom he had one child.
