= Charles P. Sisson =

American lawyer and politician

Attorney General of Rhode Island
- In office 1925–1929
- Governor: Aram J. Pothier; Norman S. Case
- Preceded by: Herbert L. Carpenter
- Succeeded by: Oscar L. Heltzen

Deputy Attorney General of Rhode Island
- In office 1929–1932

Personal details
- Born: Charles Peck Sisson; 1890 Providence, Rhode Island
- Died: August 2, 1947 (aged 56–57)
- Party: Republican

Charles Peck Sisson (1890 – August 2, 1947) was the Attorney General of Rhode Island from 1925 to 1929, serving under Governors Aram J. Pothier and Norman S. Case. He was the Republican candidate in the 1936 Rhode Island gubernatorial election, but lost to the Democratic candidate Robert E. Quinn.

== Life ==
Charles Peck Sisson was born in 1890, in Providence, Rhode Island. In 1925, he was elected as the Attorney General of Rhode Island. His term ended in 1929, when he was replaced by Oscar L. Heltzen. Later that same year, Sisson became the Deputy Attorney General of Rhode Island, a position he would hold until 1932. In 1936, he was chosen as the Republican candidate for the 1936 Rhode Island gubernatorial election. However, he lost the election to the then incumbent Lieutenant Governor, Robert E. Quinn, who beat Sisson by about 23000 votes. Sisson would die on August 2, 1947, at the age of 56 or 57.
