= Dennis J. Roberts II =

American attorney and politician

Attorney General of Rhode Island
- In office 1979–1985
- Governor: J. Joseph Garrahy
- Preceded by: Julius C. Michaelson
- Succeeded by: Arlene Violet

Personal details
- Born: May 30, 1941; Providence, Rhode Island, U.S.
- Died: October 20, 2021 (aged 80)
- Political party: Democratic
- Parent: Thomas H. Roberts (father)
- Relatives: Dennis J. Roberts (uncle)

Dennis J. Roberts II (May 30, 1941 – October 20, 2021) was an American attorney and politician. He served as attorney general of Rhode Island from 1979 to 1985.

== Life and career ==
Roberts was born in Providence, Rhode Island. He was a lawyer. Dennis' father, Thomas H. Roberts, served as both a Rhode Island Supreme Court and a Federal District Court Judge. His uncle and namesake, Dennis J. Roberts, served as both mayor of Providence and governor of Rhode Island.

Roberts served as attorney general of Rhode Island from 1979 to 1985.

Roberts died on October 20, 2021, at the age of 80.

Party political offices
Preceded by Julius C. Michaelson	Democratic nominee for Attorney General of Rhode Island; 1978, 1980, 1982, 1984	Succeeded by James E. O'Neil
