= 1936 United States elections =

- ← 1934 1935 1936 1937 1938 → Presidential election year
- Election day: November 3
- Incumbent president: ▌Franklin D. Roosevelt (D)
- Next Congress: 75th

Presidential election
- Partisan control: Democratic hold
- Popular vote margin: Democratic +24.3%
- Electoral vote
- Franklin D. Roosevelt (D): 523
- Alf Landon (R): 8
- 1936 presidential election results. Red denotes states won by Landon, blue denotes states won by Roosevelt. Numbers indicate the electoral votes won by each candidate.

Senate elections
- Overall control: Democratic hold
- Seats contested: 36 of 96 seats (32 Class 2 seats + 6 special elections)
- Net seat change: Democratic +6
- 1936 Senate results Democratic gain Democratic hold Republican gain Republican hold Farmer–Labor hold Independent gain

House elections
- Overall control: Democratic hold
- Seats contested: All 435 voting members
- Net seat change: Democratic +12
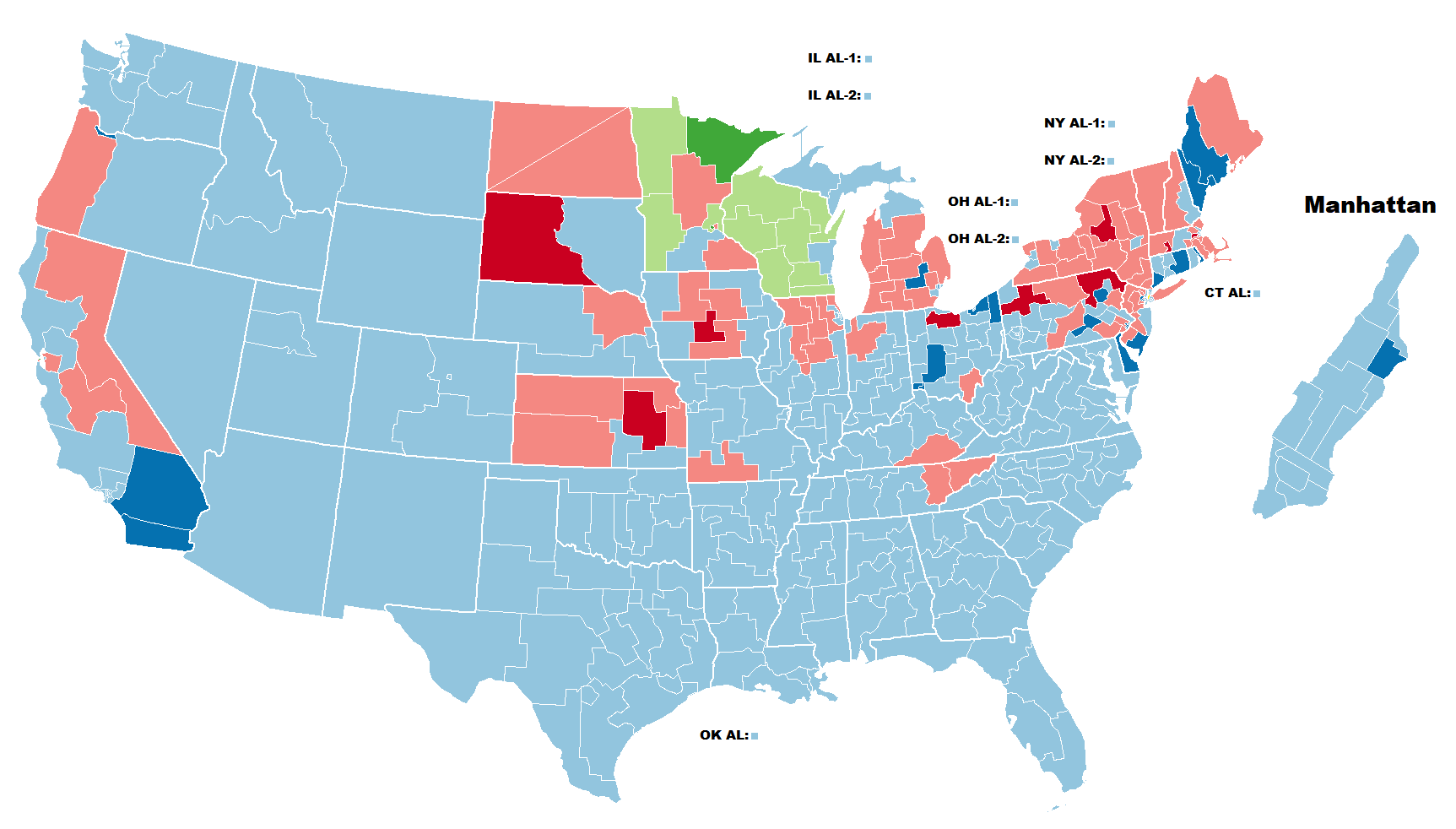
- 1936 House of Representatives results Democratic gain Democratic hold Republican gain Republican hold Third party gain Third party hold

Gubernatorial elections
- Seats contested: 36
- Net seat change: Democratic +1
- 1936 gubernatorial election results Democratic gain Democratic hold Republican gain Republican hold Farmer–Labor hold Progressive hold Non-Partisan League gain

Elections were held on November 3, 1936, during the Great Depression. Democratic President Franklin D. Roosevelt trounced Governor Alf Landon of Kansas in a landslide and the Democrats built on their majorities in both chambers of Congress.

In the presidential election, incumbent Democratic president Franklin D. Roosevelt won re-election, defeating Republican governor Alf Landon of Kansas. Roosevelt took every U.S. state with the exception of Vermont and Maine, winning with the fourth-largest electoral vote margin in American history. Roosevelt took just under 61 percent of the popular vote, a number that only Lyndon B. Johnson would surpass (although the popular vote was not officially counted prior to the 1824 election). Landon decisively won his party's nomination over Idaho Senator William Borah.

The Democrats gained twelve seats in the House of Representatives, furthering their supermajority over the Republicans. The Democrats also maintained a supermajority in the Senate, gaining seven seats. These elections marked the last time in U.S. history in which any party held three-fourths of all seats in both chambers of Congress.

== See also ==
- 1936 United States presidential election
- 1936 United States House of Representatives elections
- 1936 United States Senate elections
- 1936 United States gubernatorial elections
