= 1936 Soviet Union legislative election =

- November 1936

All 2,025 seats in the All-Union Congress of Soviets
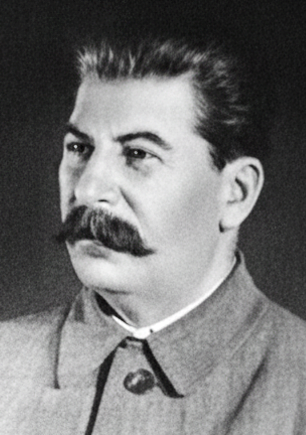

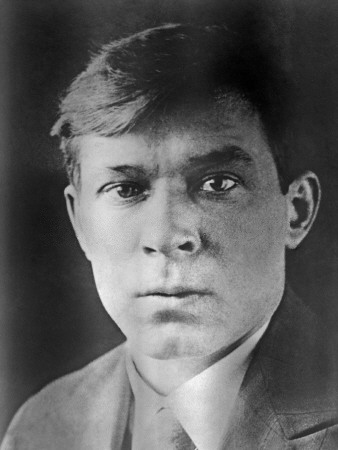

	First party	Second party	Third party
Leader	Joseph Stalin	Aleksandr Kosarev
Party	VKP(b)	Komsomol	Independents
Seats won	1,448	161	416
Seat change	▼50	▲62	▼9
Chairman of the Council of People's Commissars before election
Vyacheslav Molotov
VKP(b)
Elected Chairman of the Council of People's Commissars
Vyacheslav Molotov
VKP(b)

Legislative elections were held in Soviet Union in November 1936 to elect or delegate the 2,025 members of the eighth All-Union Congress of Soviets.

== Results ==
Party	Seats	+/–
All-Union Communist Party (Bolsheviks)	1,448	–50
Komsomol	161	+62
Independents	416	–9
Total	2,025	+3
