= James E. O'Neil =

American lawyer and Attorney General of Rhode Island

James E. O'Neil is an American lawyer and politician who served as Attorney General of Rhode Island from 1987 to 1993. Prior to his election as Attorney General, he worked as a federal prosecutor. In 2023, he was inducted into the Rhode Island Criminal Justice Hall of Fame.

Party political offices
Preceded by Dennis J. Roberts II	Democratic nominee for Attorney General of Rhode Island; 1986, 1988, 1990, 1992, 1994	Succeeded by Sara M. Quinn
