= Peter Neronha =

American lawyer (born 1963)

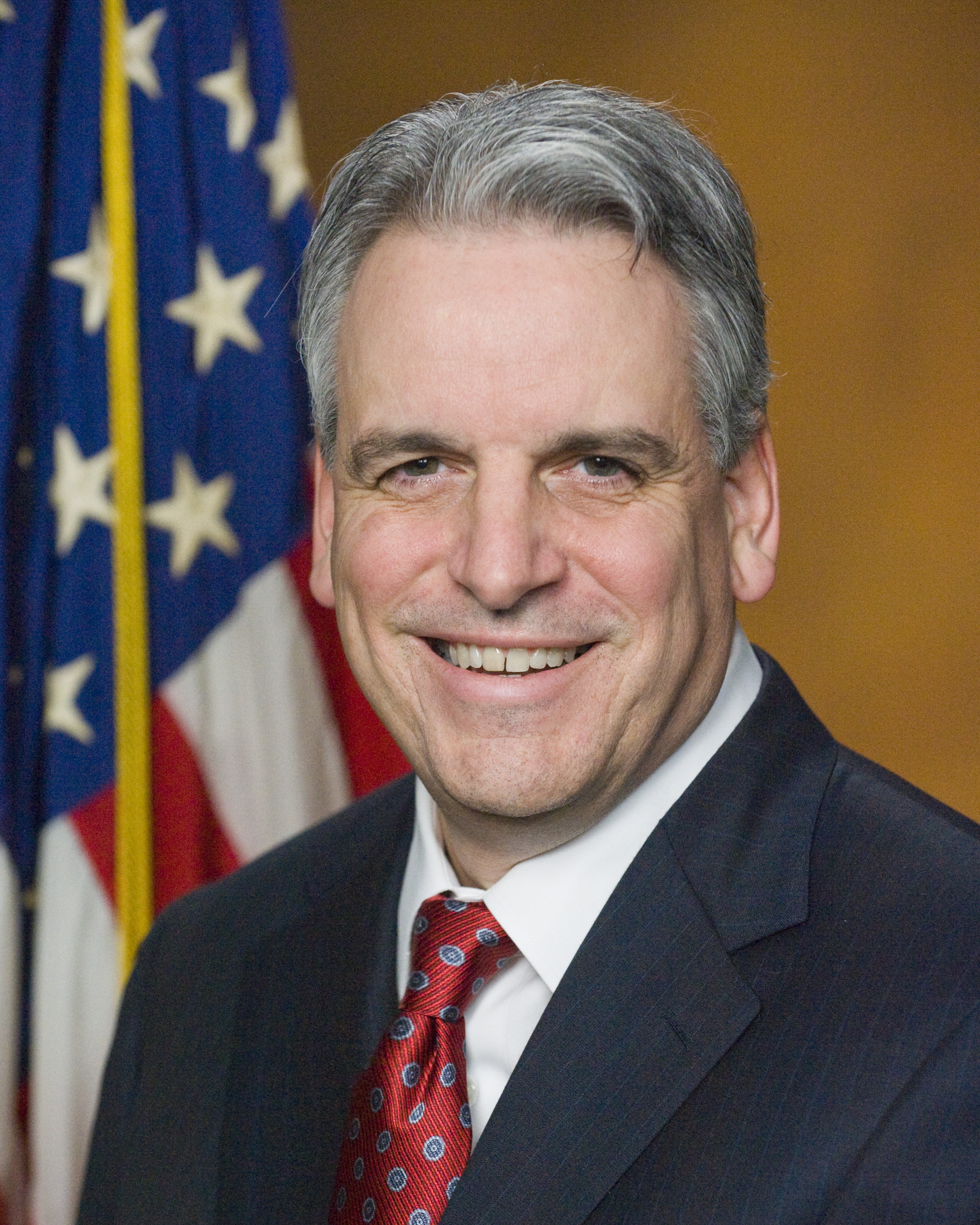
- Official portrait, 2011

74th Attorney General of Rhode Island
- Incumbent
- Assumed office January 1, 2019
- Governor: Gina Raimondo; Dan McKee
- Preceded by: Peter Kilmartin

United States Attorney for the District of Rhode Island
- In office September 16, 2009 – March 10, 2017
- President: Barack Obama; Donald Trump
- Preceded by: Robert Clark Corrente
- Succeeded by: Aaron L. Weisman

Personal details
- Born: Peter Franz Neronha; December 17, 1963 (age 62) Wakefield, Rhode Island, U.S.
- Party: Democratic
- Spouse: Shelly Johnson
- Children: 2
- Education: Boston College (BA, JD)

Peter Franz Neronha (born December 17, 1963) is an American lawyer and politician from Jamestown, Rhode Island who has served as the attorney general of Rhode Island since 2019. He previously served as the United States attorney for the District of Rhode Island under President Barack Obama from September 16, 2009 until March 10, 2017, after which he ran successfully as a Democrat for the office of Attorney General of Rhode Island in the 2018 elections.

== Early life and education ==
He was born in Wakefield, Rhode Island and attended North Kingstown High School before graduating summa cum laude from Boston College and earning a Juris Doctor from Boston College Law School, where he was a member of the Boston College Law Review.

== Career ==
Following his graduation from law school, Neronha joined the Boston, Massachusetts law firm, Goodwin Procter LLP, where he practiced commercial litigation for nearly seven years. His public service career began with his appointment as a state prosecutor in the Rhode Island Attorney General's Office in 1996. In 2002, Neronha became a federal prosecutor, joining the United States Attorney's Office. In 2009, on the recommendation of U.S. Senators Jack Reed and Sheldon Whitehouse, President Barack Obama appointed Neronha to serve as the United States Attorney for the District of Rhode Island. Neronha's appointment was unanimously confirmed by the United States Senate on September 16, 2009.

=== United States Attorney ===
While serving as United States Attorney, Neronha served two terms on the Attorney General's Advisory Committee, a group of sixteen United States Attorneys from across the country that advised the Attorney General of the United States on policy and operational matters affecting the Department of Justice nationwide. He also Co-Chaired the Operations, Management and Budget (OMB) Subcommittee, responsible for reviewing and making recommendations concerning the approximately 2 billion-dollar budget for the entire United States Attorney component of the Department of Justice.

During his seven years as United States Attorney, Neronha made public corruption the top priority of the United States Attorney's Office. Under his direction or continuation of previously started investigations, the Office prosecuted numerous cases against state and local elected officials, including a town mayor, three town councilmen, a state senator, a state representative, a House of Representatives Finance Chairman and a House Speaker, all of whom were sentenced to terms in federal prison.

As United States Attorney, Neronha prioritized combating the state's opioid crisis, combining prosecution of major, cartel-linked drug trafficking organizations with prevention initiatives. He spoke personally to over 10,000 students at high schools and moderated panels at town halls across the state. He also advocated for a "smart" approach to reducing violent crime by focusing law enforcement resources on those individuals driving violent crime, while working in the community on crime prevention and to help secure employment for people leaving prison. He also prioritized the work of the Office's Civil Division, bringing cases to protect consumers, safeguard public money from waste and abuse, and protect the environment.

Additionally, as United States Attorney, Neronha investigated Google regarding its business practice of assisting off-shore pharmacies unlawfully importing controlled substances, including opioids, into the United States. The investigation was initiated by Neronha's predecessor, Robert Corrente. As a result of that investigation, Google forfeited 500 million dollars, one of the five largest forfeitures in U.S. history, of which 230 million dollars were returned to Rhode Island.

Neronha was one of the U.S. attorneys who was asked to resign by Attorney General Jeff Sessions in the 2017 dismissal of U.S. attorneys.

=== Attorney General of Rhode Island ===
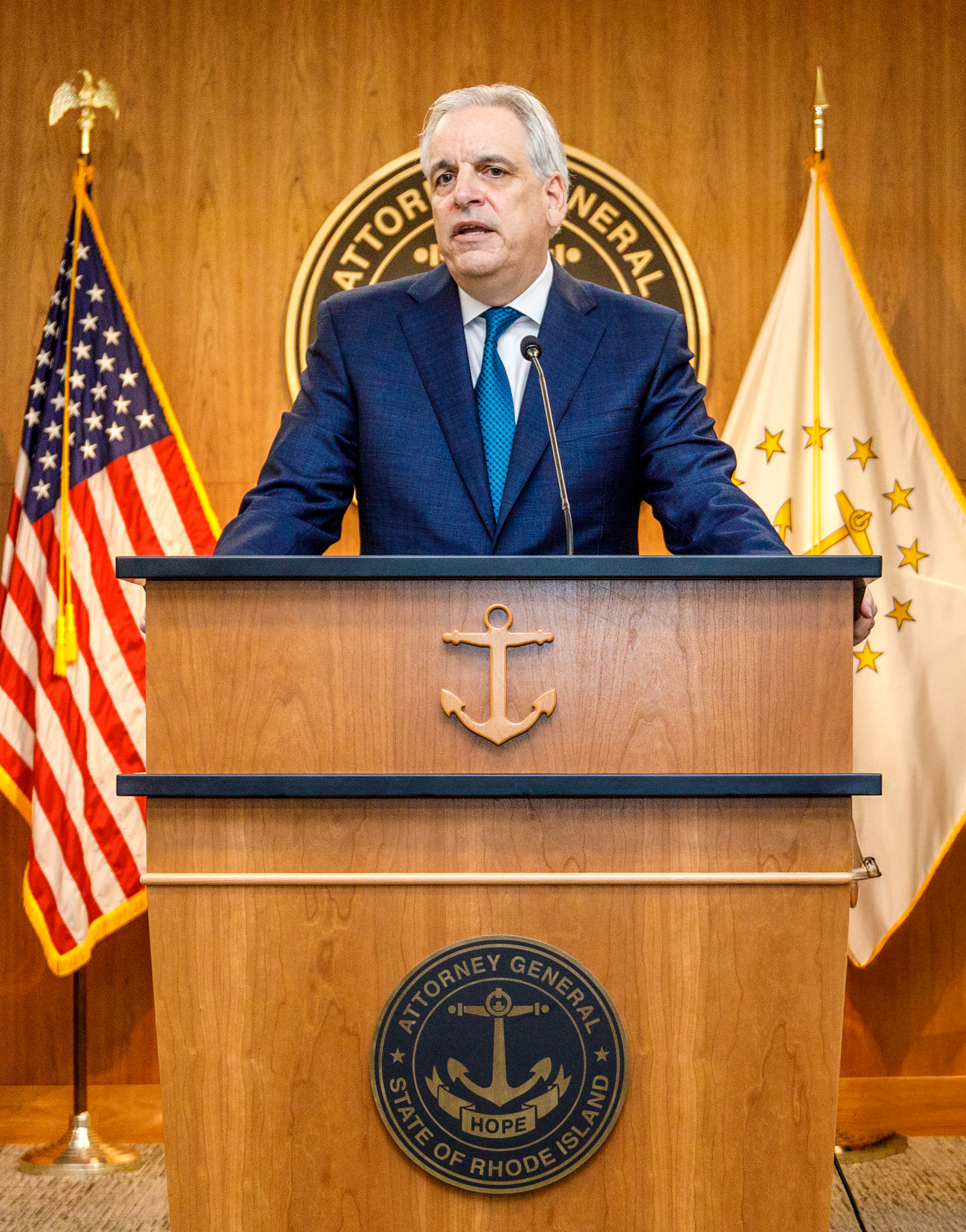
As Rhode Island Attorney General in 2023

In October 2017, Neronha announced that he would seek the Democratic nomination for the office of Attorney General of Rhode Island. The previous Attorney General, Peter Kilmartin was term limited. Neronha was the only Democrat running for the office. He ran against Compassion Party candidate Alan Gordon.

In the general election, Neronha defeated Alan Gordon of the Compassion Party 79.8% to 19.1%.

As Attorney General of Rhode Island, Neronha joined a multi-state lawsuit to challenge the President's National Emergency Concerning the Southern Border of the United States.

He has started a review into the Catholic Diocese of Providence to review sexual abuse claims against the church. The review is going through almost 70 years worth of records from the Diocese of Providence and will be modeled on the report from the Grand jury investigation of Catholic Church sexual abuse in Pennsylvania.

Neronha, alongside Governor Gina Raimondo, has submitted a package of gun control bills for consideration by the General Assembly. These include making it illegal to purchase a gun on behalf of someone else who is prohibited from owning a gun themselves and requiring that all firearms be safely stored unless being used by the owner. He also supported some other bills such as an assault weapons ban bill and universal background check bill that were being considered by the assembly.

== Personal life ==
Neronha and his wife Shelly Johnson and have two sons, Zach and Josh.

== See also ==
- 2017 dismissal of U.S. attorneys

Legal offices
Preceded by Robert Clark Corrente	U.S. Attorney for the District of Rhode Island; 2009–2017	Succeeded by Aaron L. Weisman
Preceded by Peter Kilmartin	Attorney General of Rhode Island; 2019–present	Incumbent
Party political offices
Preceded by Peter Kilmartin	Democratic nominee for Attorney General of Rhode Island; 2018, 2022	Succeeded by Kimberly Ahern
