= 1936 Romanian local elections =

Local elections were held in the Kingdom of Romania in 1936.
