= 1936 Texas lieutenant gubernatorial election =

- November 3, 1936

Nominee	Walter Frank Woodul	R. W. Humphreys
Party	Democratic	Republican
Popular vote	784,005	56,396
Percentage	93.15%	6.70%
Lieutenant Governor before election
Walter Frank Woodul
Democratic
Elected Lieutenant Governor
Walter Frank Woodul
Democratic

The 1936 Texas lieutenant gubernatorial election was held on November 3, 1936, in order to elect the lieutenant governor of Texas. Incumbent Democratic lieutenant governor Walter Frank Woodul defeated Republican nominee R. W. Humphreys.

== General election ==
On election day, November 3, 1936, incumbent Democratic lieutenant governor Walter Frank Woodul won re-election by a margin of 727,609 votes against his opponent Republican nominee R. W. Humphreys, thereby retaining Democratic control over the office of lieutenant governor. Woodul was sworn in for his second term on January 19, 1937.

=== Results ===
Texas lieutenant gubernatorial election, 1936
Party	Candidate	Votes	%
Democratic	Walter Frank Woodul (incumbent)	784,005	93.15
Republican	R. W. Humphreys	56,396	6.70
	Scattering	1,227	0.15
Total votes		841,628	100.00
Democratic hold			
