= 1968 Rhode Island gubernatorial election =

- November 5, 1968
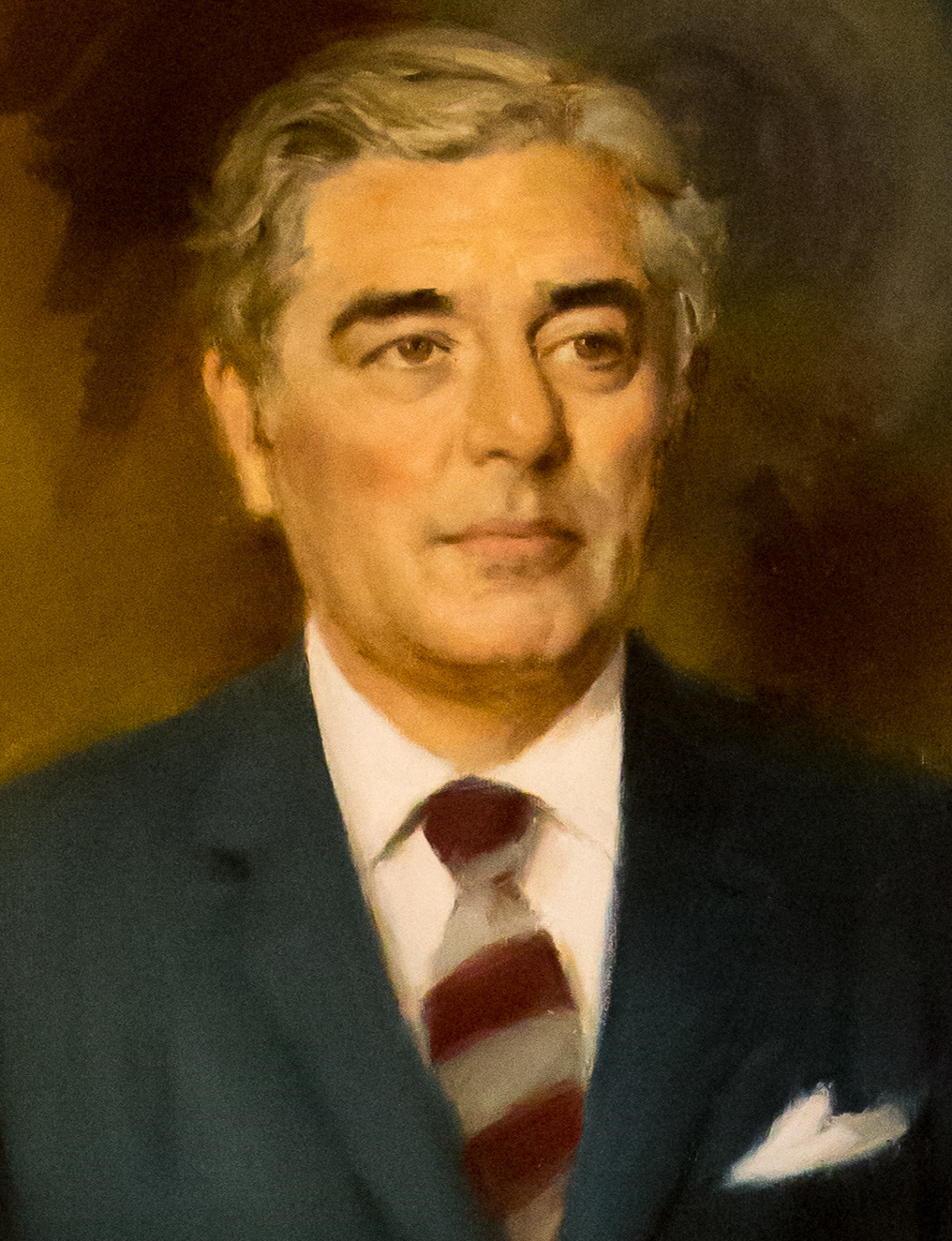

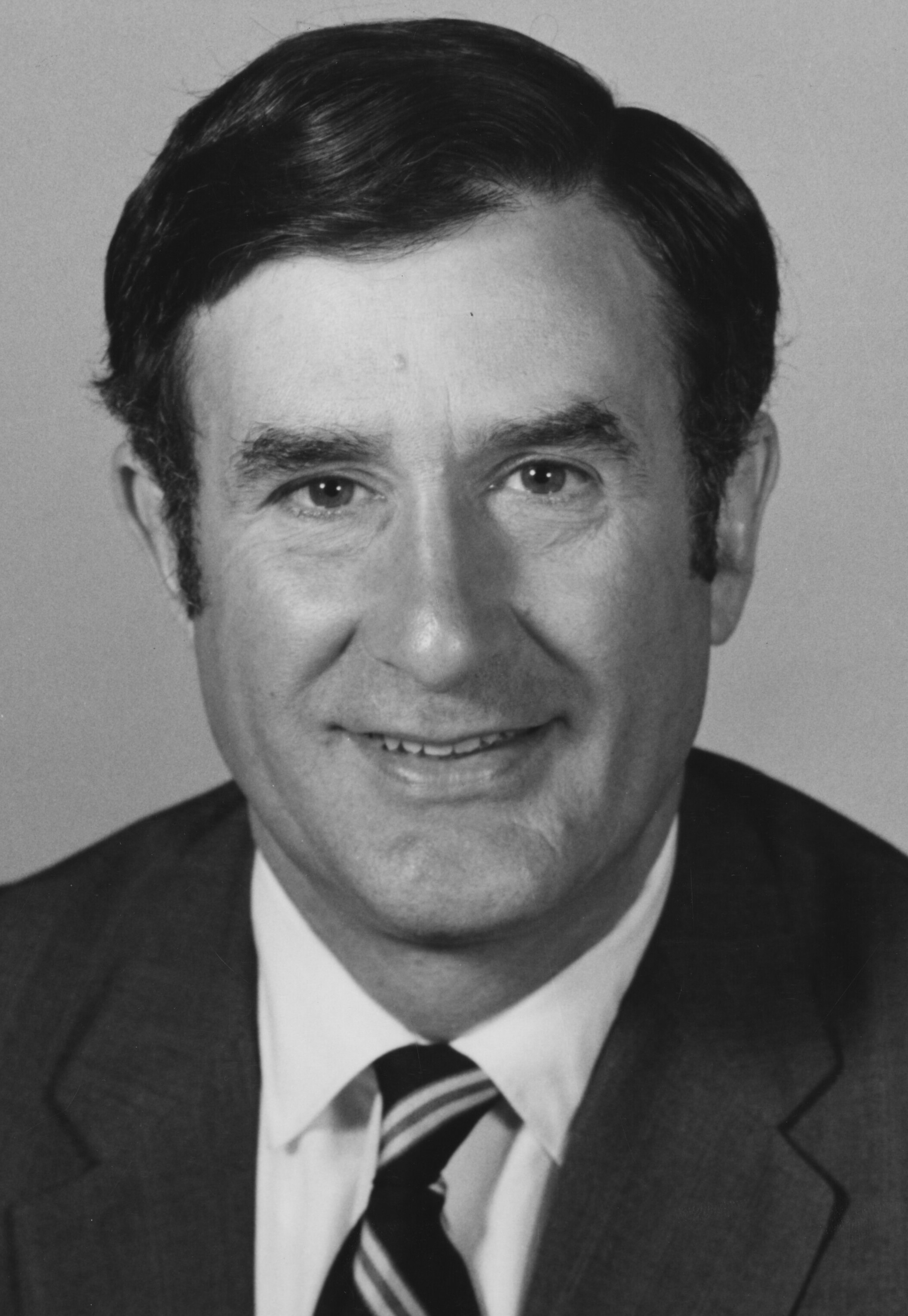
Nominee	Frank Licht	John Chafee
Party	Democratic	Republican
Popular vote	195,766	187,958
Percentage	51.02%	48.98%
- Licht: 50–60% 60–70% Chafee: 50–60% 60–70% 70–80%
Governor before election
John Chafee
Republican
Elected Governor
Frank Licht
Democratic

The 1968 Rhode Island gubernatorial election was held on November 5, 1968. Democratic nominee Frank Licht defeated incumbent Republican John Chafee with 51.02% of the vote.

== General election ==
=== Candidates ===
- Frank Licht, Democratic
- John Chafee, Republican

=== Results ===
1968 Rhode Island gubernatorial election
Party	Candidate	Votes	%	±%
Democratic	Frank Licht	195,766	51.02%	
Republican	John Chafee (incumbent)	187,958	48.98%	
Majority		7,808		
Turnout		383,725		
Democratic gain from Republican		Swing		

==== By county ====
	Frank Licht Democratic		John Chafee Republican		All Others Independent	
County	Votes	%	Votes	%	Votes	%
Bristol	8,683	44.7%	10,735	55.3%	1	0.01%
Kent	27,360	45.2%	33,107	54.8%	0	0.0%
Newport	12,853	46.7%	14,657	53.3%	0	0.0%
Providence	135,223	54.2%	114,468	45.8%	0	0.0%
Washington	11,647	43.7%	14,991	56.3%	0	0.0%

Counties that flipped from Republican to Democratic

- Providence
