= 1936 New York gubernatorial election =

- November 3, 1936
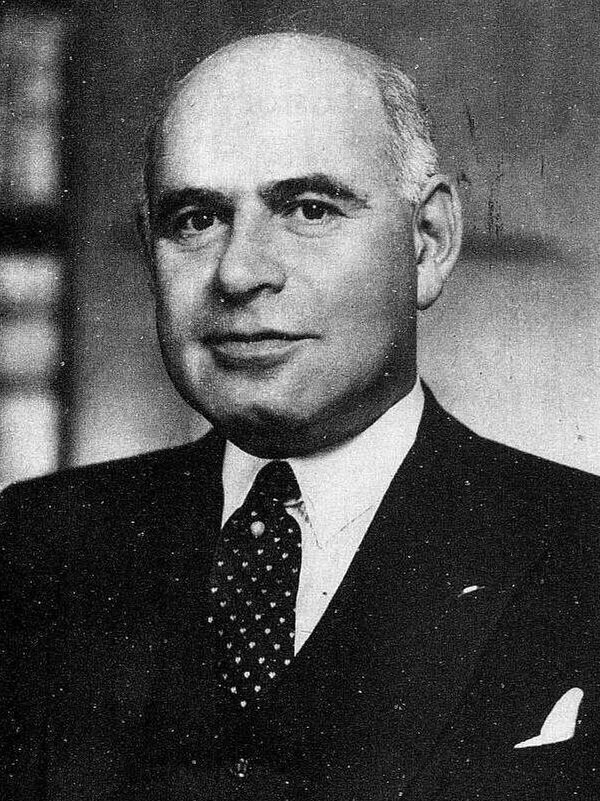

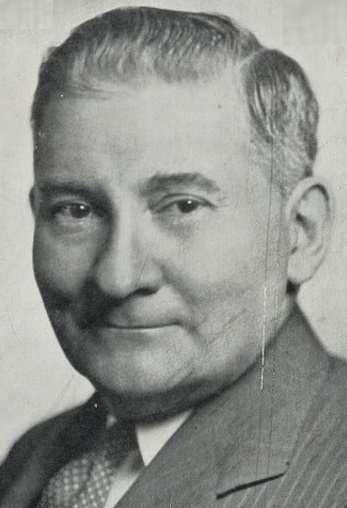
Nominee	Herbert H. Lehman	William F. Bleakley
Party	Democratic	Republican
Alliance	American Labor
Popular vote	2,970,575	2,450,104
Percentage	53.45%	44.09%
- County results Lehman: 40–50% 50–60% 60–70% 70–80% Bleakley: 40–50% 50–60% 60–70% 70–80%
Governor before election
Herbert H. Lehman
Democratic
Elected Governor
Herbert H. Lehman
Democratic

The 1936 New York gubernatorial election was held on November 3, 1936, to elect the Governor of New York. Incumbent Democratic governor Herbert H. Lehman ran for re-election, and he defeated Republican William F. Bleakley in the general election.

== General election ==
=== Candidates ===
- William F. Bleakley, former Justice of the New York Supreme Court's 9th District (Republican)
- Harry W. Laidler, (Socialist)
- Herbert H. Lehman, Governor of New York since 1933 (Democratic)
- Robert Minor, (Communist)

=== Results ===
1936 New York gubernatorial election
Party	Candidate	Votes	%	±%
Democratic	Herbert H. Lehman	2,708,383	47.60%	
American Labor	Herbert H. Lehman	262,192	4.61%	
Total	Herbert H. Lehman	2,970,575	53.45%	
Republican	William F. Bleakley	2,450,104	44.09%	
Socialist	Harry W. Laidler	96,233	1.73%	
Communist	Robert Minor	40,406	0.73%	
Total votes		5,557,318	100.00%	

== See also ==
- 1936 New York state election
- New York gubernatorial elections
