= Oscar L. Heltzen =

American lawyer and politician

Oscar Leonard Heltzen (August 4, 1882 – February, 1968) was an American lawyer who served as the Attorney General of Rhode Island from 1929 to 1930.

He was born in Clifton Forge, Virginia, to Charles Leonard Heltzen and Anna Mathilde Johnson. He attended Hope High School, and graduated from Harvard College in 1906.

He was active in the Central Congregational Church.

He married Mildred Bancroft Knight in 1908.
