= 1936 Rhode Island gubernatorial election =

- November 3, 1936
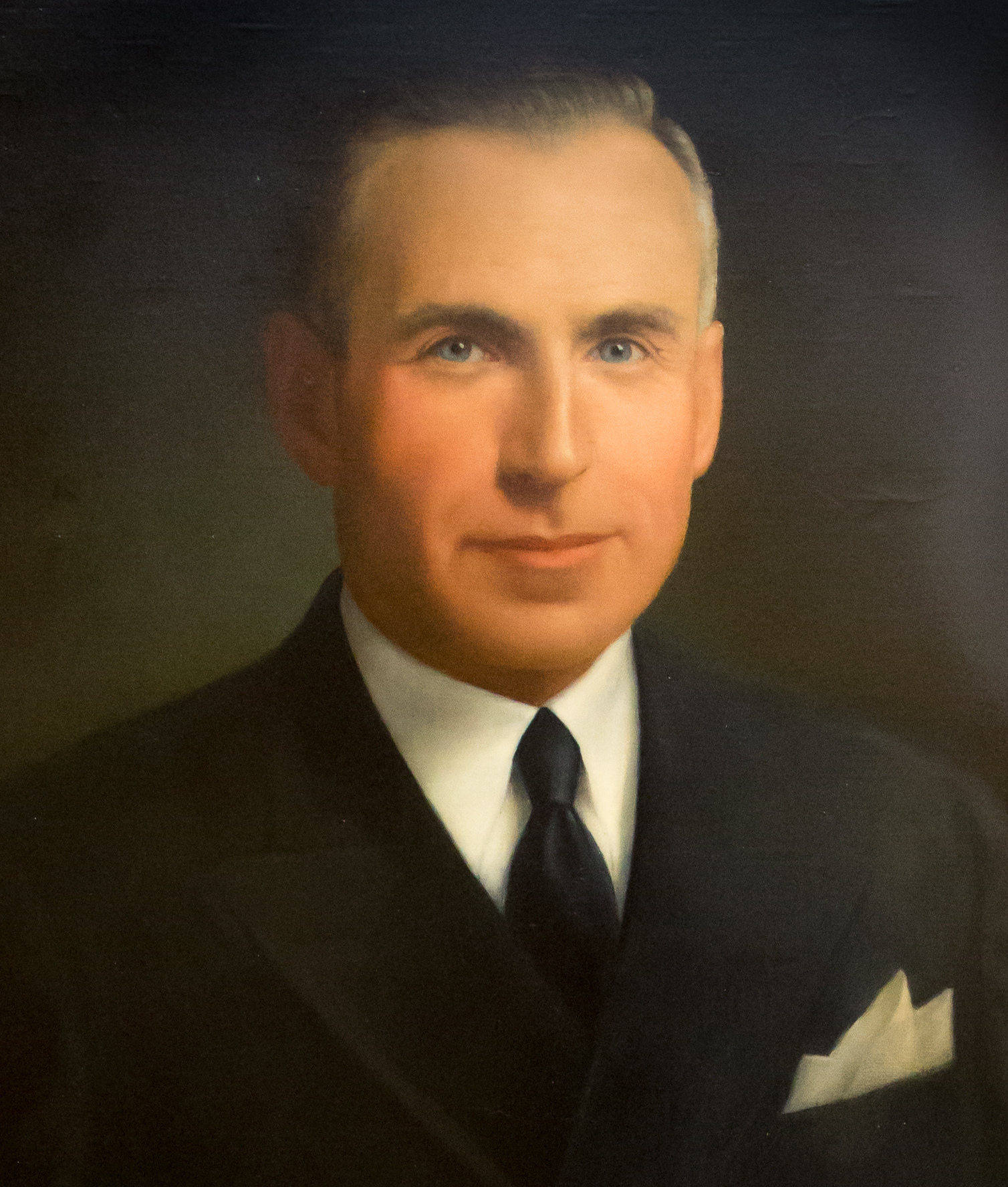

| Nominee | Robert E. Quinn | Charles P. Sisson |
| Party | Democratic | Republican |
| Popular vote | 160,776 | 137,369 |
| Percentage | 53.66% | 45.85% |
- Quinn: 50–60% 60–70% Sisson: 50–60% 60–70% 70–80%
Governor before election
Theodore F. Green
Democratic
Elected Governor
Robert E. Quinn
Democratic

The 1936 Rhode Island gubernatorial election was held on November 3, 1936. Democratic nominee Robert E. Quinn defeated Republican nominee Charles P. Sisson with 53.66% of the vote.

== General election ==
=== Candidates ===
Major party candidates

- Robert E. Quinn, Democratic
- Charles P. Sisson, Republican

Other candidates

- Charles F. Bishop, Socialist Labor
- James P. Reid, Communist

=== Results ===
1936 Rhode Island gubernatorial election
| Party | Candidate | Votes | % | ±% |
|---|---|---|---|---|
| Democratic | Robert E. Quinn | 160,776 | 53.66% | |
| Republican | Charles P. Sisson | 137,369 | 45.85% | |
| Socialist Labor | Charles F. Bishop | 998 | 0.33% | |
| Communist | James P. Reid | 481 | 0.16% | |
| Majority | | 23,407 | | |
| Turnout | | | | |
| Democratic hold | | Swing | | |
