= Frank Licht =

American politician

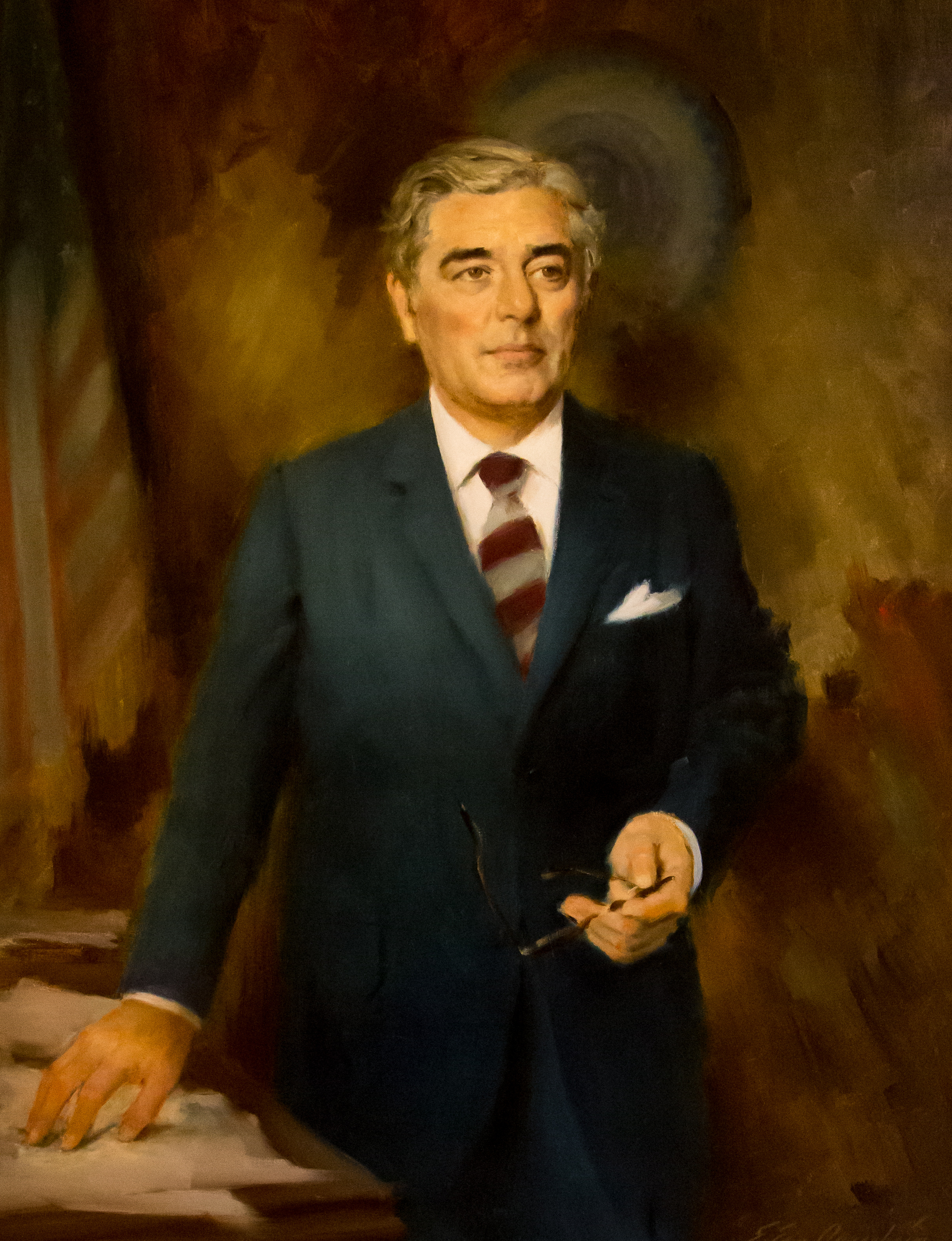

67th Governor of Rhode Island
- In office January 7, 1969 – January 2, 1973
- Lieutenant: J. Joseph Garrahy
- Preceded by: John Chafee
- Succeeded by: Philip Noel

Personal details
- Born: March 3, 1916 Providence, Rhode Island, U.S.
- Died: May 30, 1987 (aged 71) Providence, Rhode Island, U.S.
- Party: Democratic
- Spouse: Dorothy Krauss
- Children: 3
- Education: Brown University (BA); Harvard University (LLB)

Frank Licht (March 3, 1916 – May 30, 1987) was an American politician and the 67th governor of Rhode Island from 1969 to 1973, serving as the first Jewish governor in Rhode Island state history. He was also an associate justice of the Rhode Island Superior Court from 1956 to 1968 and a member of the Rhode Island Senate from 1949 to 1956.

== Early life and career ==
Licht was born on March 3, 1916 in Providence, Rhode Island. He was the son of Jewish immigrants Rochel "Rose" Kassed from Klevan and Jacob Licht from Rovno, Russian Empire (now Ukraine). He had two brothers, Harry and Julius.

He graduated from Brown University in 1938 and Harvard Law School in 1941, where he was a member of Phi Beta Kappa society at both universities. In 1946, he married Dorothy Shirley Krauss; they had three daughters, and eight grandchildren.

In 1942 Licht was admitted to the Rhode Island bar, where he served as a law clerk for Judge John C. Mahoney of the United States Court of Appeals for the First Circuit in Boston. He was a partner with the Providence firm of Letts & Quinn from 1943 to 1956 and was an active member of the Freemasons.

Licht was elected to the Rhode Island Senate in 1949 and served there until 1956. He sat on the Superior Court of Rhode Island from 1956 to 1968. During his time on the Superior Court, Licht was a founding member of the Providence Human Rights Commission, was the Chairman of the Chapin Hospital Commission, and was a general lecturer at Bryant College in Smithfield, Rhode Island, where he was a member of Delta Sigma Rho, a national debating fraternity.

== Governor of Rhode Island 1969–1973 ==
In 1968 Licht announced his intention to run for the Democratic nominee for Governor of Rhode Island. During the campaign Licht was seen as the underdog candidate against three term incumbent, later Secretary of the Navy, and U.S. Senator, John Chafee. On November 5, 1968, Licht beat Chafee in a close election, winning with only 51% of the vote. He served as the first Jewish governor of the state of Rhode Island from 1969 to 1973.

As governor, he reversed campaign promises he made in 1968 and 1970, pushing through Rhode Island's first income tax in order to resolve a worsening fiscal crisis. He signed the tax bill minutes after the Senate had passed it on a 26–24 vote, against the backdrop of some 500 angry demonstrators in the State House. During his term as governor, Licht approved more business projects than any other governor in Rhode Island's history, and helped create the Rhode Island Department of Social Rehabilitation Services, and the Rhode Island Department of Mental Health, Retardation, and Hospitals. Licht took a strong stand on environmental protection, playing a big role in revitalizing the New England Water Pollution Control Commission. He created an eleven-member Governor's Council on Environmental Quality, expanding regulatory authority against air and water pollution, and providing tax credits to businesses that included pollution-control systems into their operations. In 1973 Governor Licht did not run for reelection due his unpopularity for implementing a temporary statewide sales tax.

== Later life and death ==
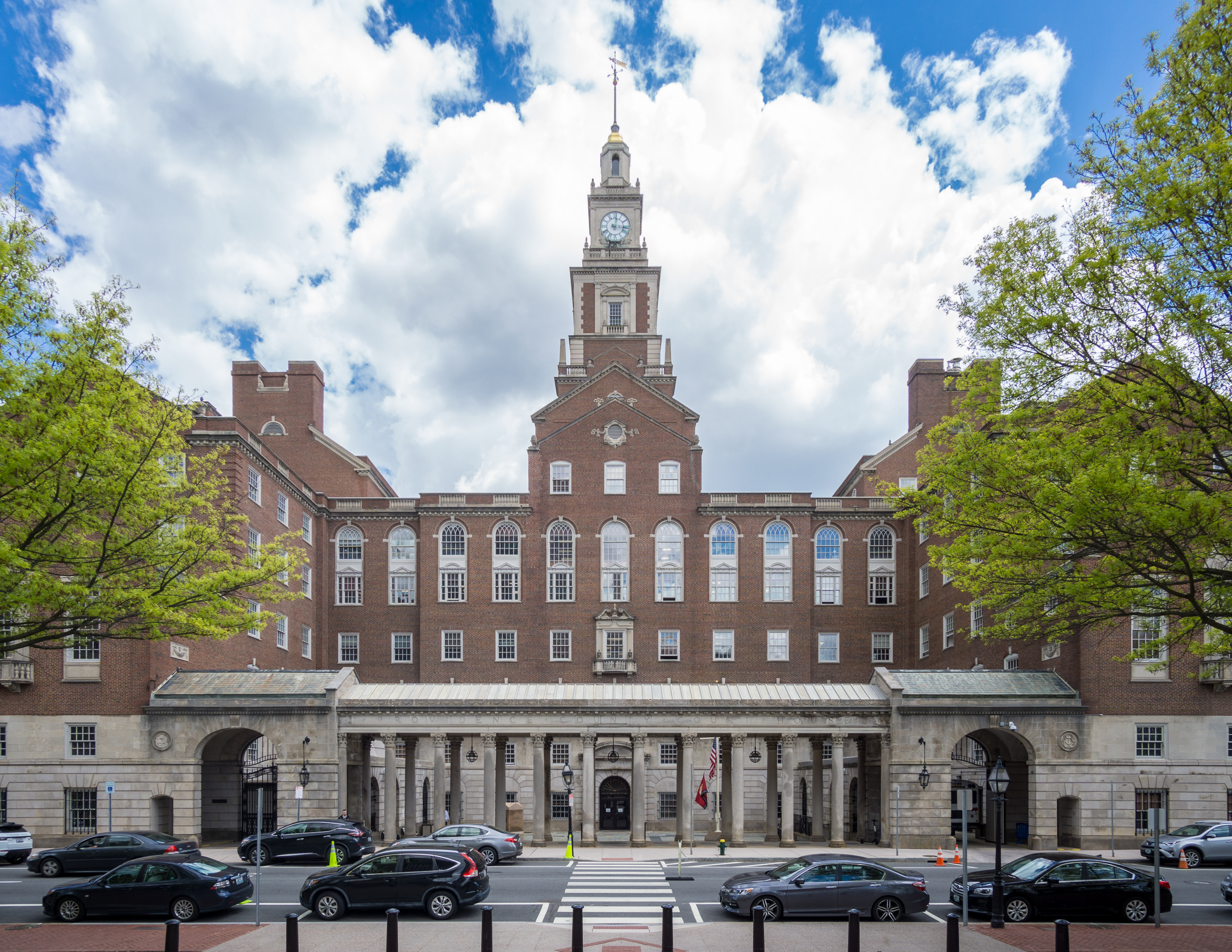
The Frank Licht Judicial Complex, in Providence Rhode Island

After leaving office as governor, Licht returned to practicing law in Rhode Island. The Providence County Courthouse in College Hill, Providence, where the Rhode Island Superior Court, the Rhode Island Supreme Court, and the Rhode Island Law Library are located, and where Licht served as a justice of the Rhode Island Superior Court, was named the Frank Licht Judicial Complex in 1986, in honor of the former governor, and justice of the court.

Frank Licht was the uncle of Richard A. Licht, who was Lieutenant Governor of Rhode Island from 1985 to 1989 and unsuccessfully challenged John Chafee for the U.S. Senate seat he held in 1988. His grandson is television writer and comedian Zach Kanin.

On May 30, 1987, Licht died of cancer at Roger Williams Hospital, in Providence Rhode Island. He was survived by his father, Jacob Licht; his wife, Dorothy; his three daughters, and four grandchildren. Michael Dukakis, the Governor of Massachusetts, the later 1988 Democratic nominee for President, and friend of Governor Licht, attended and spoke at his funeral in 1987.

Party political offices
Preceded by Horace Hobbs	Democratic nominee for Governor of Rhode Island; 1968, 1970	Succeeded by Philip Noel
Political offices
Preceded by John Chafee	Governor of Rhode Island; 1969–1973	Succeeded by Philip Noel
