= List of Rhode Island attorneys general =

Attorney General of Rhode Island
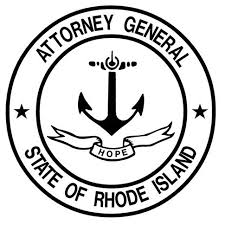
- Seal of the attorney general of Rhode Island

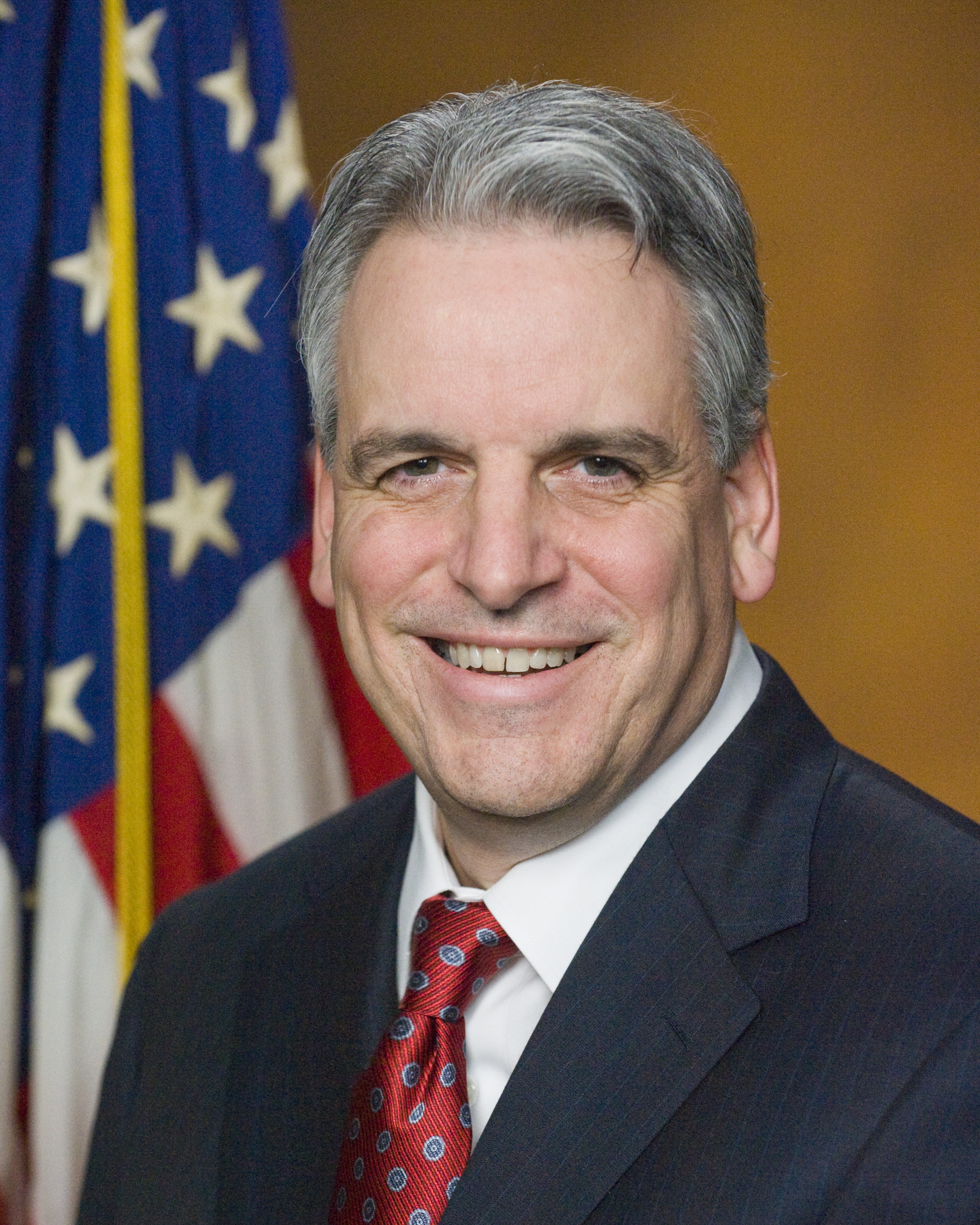
- Incumbent; Peter Neronha since January 1, 2019
- Department of Law
- Style: The Honourable
- Term length: Four years Renewal once
- Constituting instrument: Constitution of Rhode Island, Executive Law
- Formation: 1776
- First holder: Daniel Updike
- Succession: Election by joint session of Rhode Island General Assembly
- Salary: $130,413 (2019)
- Website: www.riag.ri.gov

The attorney general of Rhode Island is the chief legal advisor of the government of the State of Rhode Island and oversees the State of Rhode Island Department of Law. The attorney general is directly elected every four years. The current attorney general is Peter F. Neronha.

== History of the Rhode Island attorneys general ==
In 1643, Roger Williams obtained a patent (charter) from the English Parliament. The towns of Providence and Warwick elected a Chief Officer under the authority of this Parliamentary Patent of 1643. In 1647, the towns of Newport, Portsmouth, Providence, and Warwick formed a united colony under the Parliamentary Patent. In May 1650, the offices of "Attorney General for the Colonie" and "Solicitor" were created.

== List of attorneys general of Rhode Island ==
=== Patent of 1643 ===
==== Attorney general ====
- William Dyer: May 1650 – 1651

==== Solicitor ====
- Hugh Built: May 1650 – 1651

==== Coddington Commission ====
- John Easton, of Newport: May 1653 – May 1654 (Attorney General only for Portsmouth and Newport following the repeal of the Coddington Commission, and before the re-unification of the four towns into a single government)

==== Attorneys general ====
- John Cranston, of Newport May 1654 – May 1656
- John Easton, of Newport May 1656 – May 1657
- John Greene, Jr. of Warwick May 1657 – May 1660
- John Easton, of Newport May 1660 – May 1663

=== Royal Charter of 1663 ===
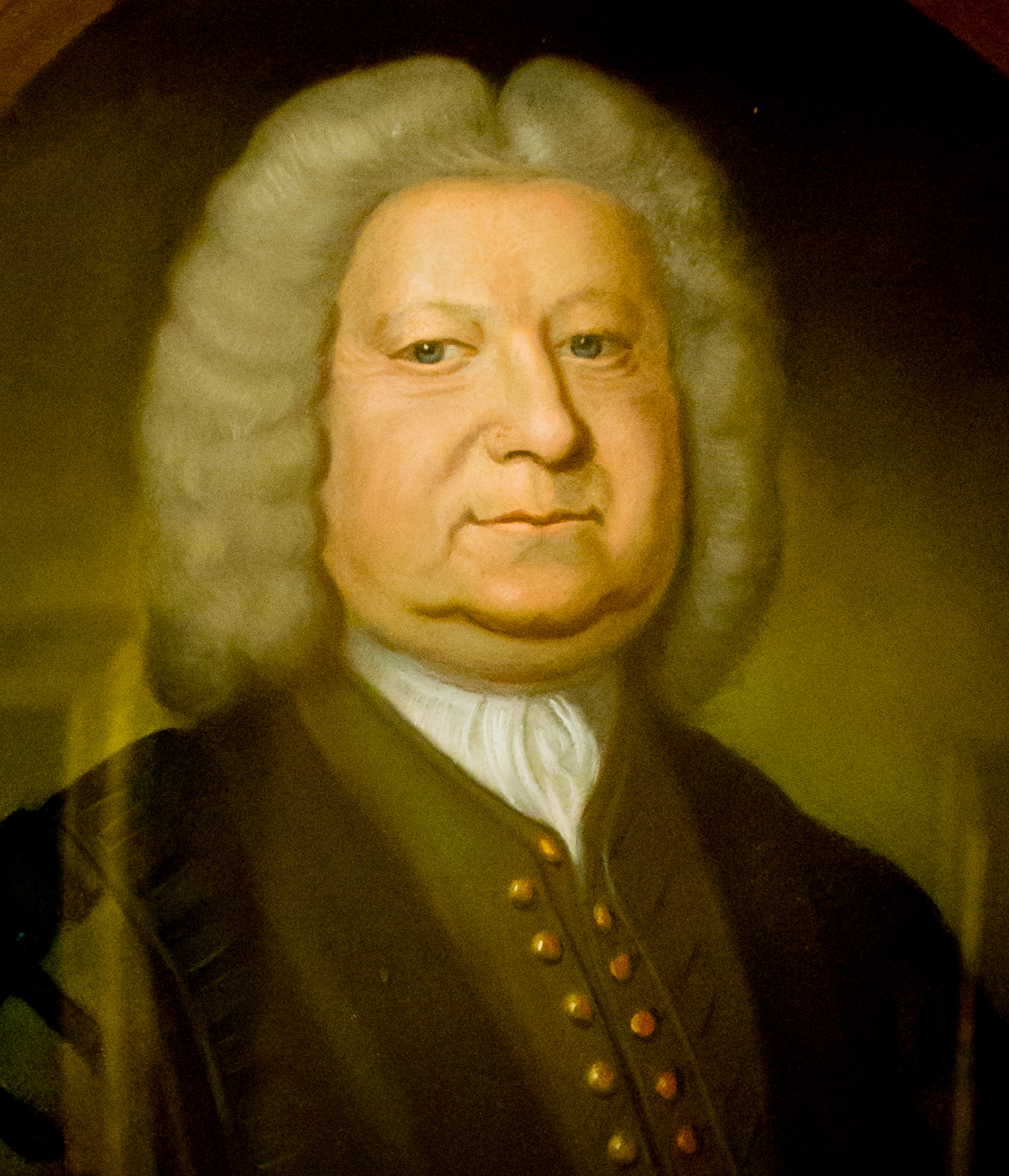
Richard Ward, 1712–1713

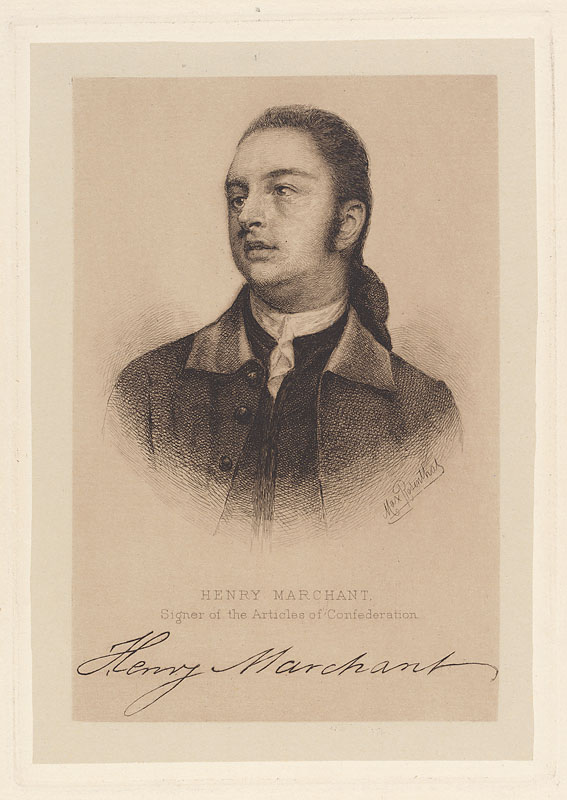
Henry Marchant, 1771–1777

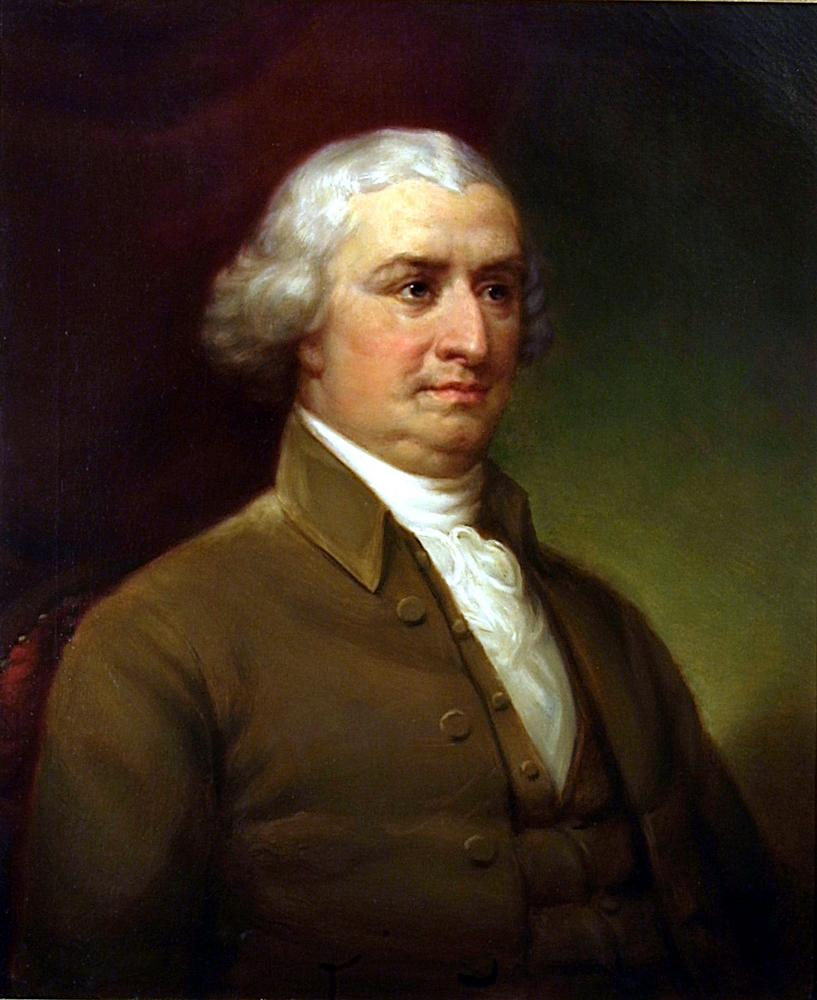
David Howell, 1789–1790

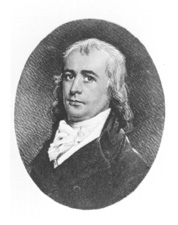
Ray Greene, 1794–1797

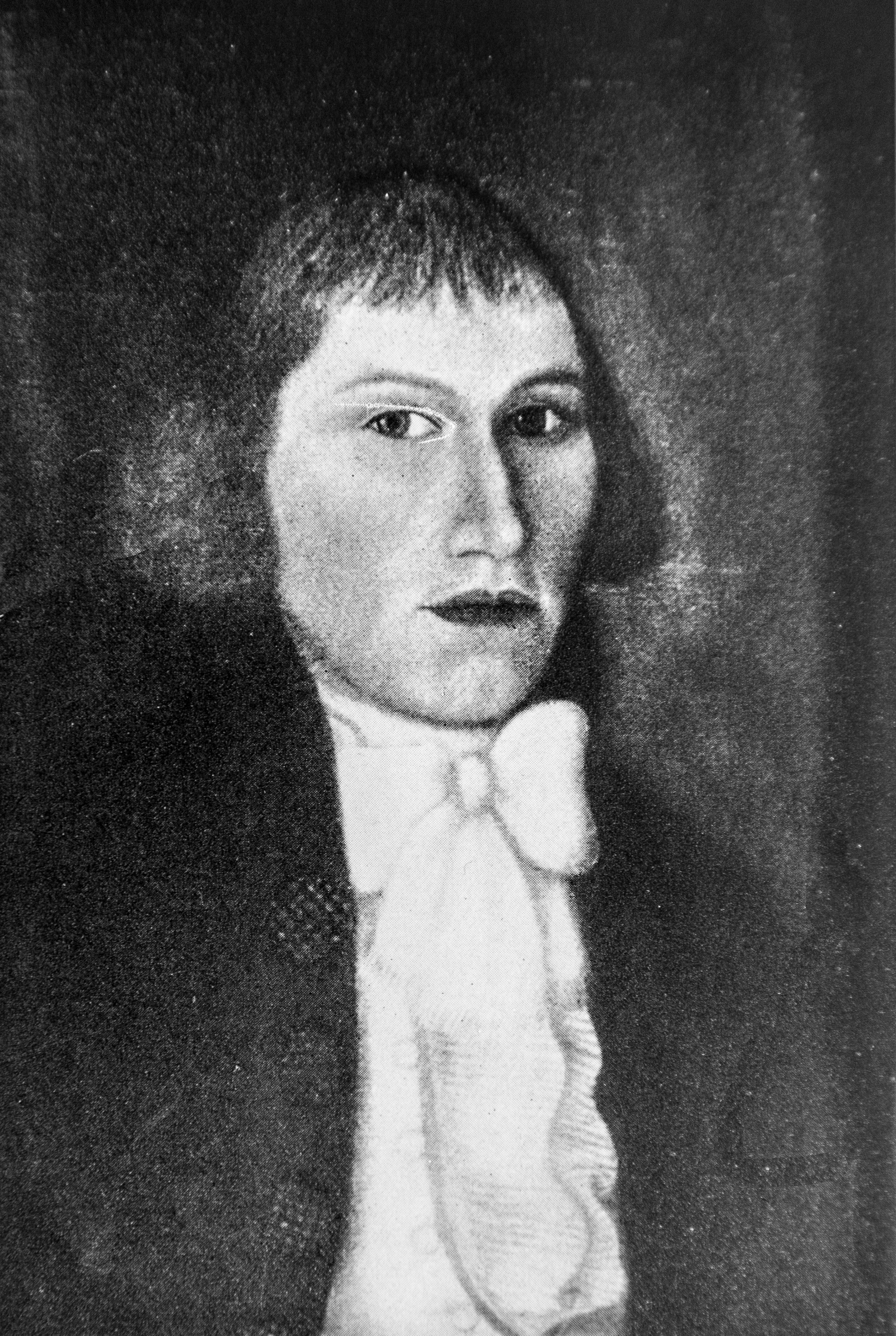
James Burrill, Jr., 1797–1814

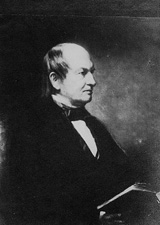
Albert C. Greene, 1825–1843

- John Sanford, of Portsmouth May 1663 – November 1664
- John Easton, of Newport 1664–1670
- John Sanford, of Portsmouth 1670–1671
- Joseph Torrey, of Newport 1671–1672
- John Easton, of Newport 1672–1674
- Peter Easton, of Newport 1674–1676
- Weston Clarke, of Newport 1676–1677
- Edward Richmond, of Newport 1677–1680
- Weston Clarke, of Newport 1680–1681
- Edmund Calverly, of Warwick 1681–1682
- John Pococke, of Newport 1684–1685
- Weston Clarke, of Newport 1685–1686
- John Pococke, of Newport 1684–1685
- Weston Clarke, of Newport 1685–1686
- John Williams, of Newport 1686–1689
- John Pococke, of Newport May 1690 – ????
- John Smith, of Warwick May 1696 – 1698
- John Pococke, of Newport 1698–1700
- John Rhodes, of Warwick 1700–1701
- John Pococke, of Newport 1701–1702
- Nathaniel Dyre, of Newport 1702–1704
- Joseph Sheffield, of Newport 1704–1706
- Simon Smith, of Warwick 1706–1712
- Richard Ward, of Newport 1712–1713
- John Hammett, of Newport 1713–1714
- Weston Clarke, of Newport 1714–1721
- Henry Bull, of Newport 1721–1722
- Daniel Updike, of North Kingstown 1722–1732
- James Honeyman, Jr., of Newport 1732–1740

==== King's attorneys ====
- James Honeyman, Jr., of Newport 1741–1743
- John Wanton, of Providence County 1741–1742
- Daniel Updike, of King's County 1741–1743
- John Andrew, of Providence County 1742–1743

==== Attorneys general ====
- Daniel Updike, of North Kingstown 1746–1747
- Augustus Johnston, of Newport 1758–1766
- Oliver Arnold, of Providence 1766–1771
- Henry Marchant, of Newport 1772–1776 (Independent)
- William Channing, of Newport 1777–1786 (Country)
- Henry Goodwin, of Newport 1787–1788 (Country)
- David Howell, of Providence 1789 (PA)
- Daniel Updike, of North Kingstown 1790
- William Channing, of Newport 1791–1793 (Country)
- Ray Greene, of Providence 1794–1796 (Federalist)
- James Burrill, Jr., of Providence 1797–1813 (Federalist)
- Samuel W. Bridgham, of Providence 1814–1816 (Federalist)
- Henry Bowen, of Providence 1817–1818 (Democratic-Republican)
- Dutee J. Pearce, of Newport 1819–1824 (Democratic-Republican)
- Albert C. Greene, of East Greenwich 1825–1842 (Whig)

=== Constitution of Rhode Island (1843–present) ===
Image	Name	Party	Term of office	Residence
	Joseph M. Blake	Law and Order	1843–1850	Bristol
	Walter S. Burges	Democratic	1851–1853	Cranston
	Christopher Robinson	Whig	1854	Cumberland
	Charles Hart	Republican	1855–1857	Providence
	Jerome Kimball	Republican	1858–1859	Providence
	Walter S. Burges	Democratic	1860–1862	Cranston
	Abraham Payne	Republican	1863–1863	Providence
	Horatio Rogers	Republican	1864–1866	Providence
	Willard Sayles	Republican	1866–1881	Providence
	Samuel P. Colt	Republican	1882–1885	Bristol
	Edwin Metcalf	Prohibition	1886	Providence
	Ziba O. Slocum	Democratic	1887	Providence
	Horatio Rogers	Republican	1888	Providence
	Ziba O. Slocum	Democratic	1889–1890	Providence
	Robert W. Burbank	Republican	1891–1893	Providence
	Edward C. Dubois	Republican	1894–1896	East Providence
	Willard B. Tanner	Republican	1897–1900	Providence
	Charles F. Stearns	Democratic	1901–1904	Providence
	William B. Greenough	Republican	1905–1911	Providence
	Herbert A. Rice	Republican	1912–1922	Pawtucket
	Herbert L. Carpenter	Democratic	1923–1924	North Smithfield
	Charles P. Sisson	Republican	1925–1928	Providence
	Oscar L. Heltzen	Republican	1929–1930	Providence
	Benjamin M. McLyman	Republican	1931–1933	Providence
	John P. Hartigan	Democratic	1933–1938	Cranston
	Louis V. Jackvony	Republican	1939–1940	Providence
	John H. Nolan	Democratic	1941–1949	Newport
	William E. Powers	Democratic	1949–1957	Cumberland
	J. Joseph Nugent	Democratic	1958–1967	Providence
	Herbert F. DeSimone	Republican	1967–1971	Providence
	Richard J. Israel	Republican	1971–1975	Providence
	Julius C. Michaelson	Democratic	1975–1979	Providence
	Dennis J. Roberts II	Democratic	1979–1985	Providence
	Arlene Violet	Republican	1985–1987	Providence
	James E. O'Neil	Democratic	1987–1993	Narragansett
	Jeffrey B. Pine	Republican	1993–1999	Providence
	Sheldon Whitehouse	Democratic	1999–2003	Providence
	Patrick C. Lynch	Democratic	2003–2011	East Providence
	Peter Kilmartin	Democratic	2011–2019	Pawtucket
	Peter Neronha	Democratic	2019–present	Jamestown
