= Politics of Rhode Island =

Since the Great Depression, Rhode Island politics have been dominated by the Rhode Island Democratic Party, and the state is considered part of the Democrats' "Blue Wall." Democrats have won all but four presidential elections since 1928, with the exceptions being 1952, 1956, 1972, and 1984. The Rhode Island Republican Party, although virtually non-existent in the Rhode Island General Assembly, has remained competitive in gubernatorial elections, having won one as recently as 2006. Until 2014, Democrats had not won a gubernatorial election in the state since 1992, and it was not until 2018 that they won one by double digits. The Rhode Island General Assembly has continuously been under Democratic control since 1959.

United States presidential election results for Rhode Island
Year	Republican / Whig		Democratic		Third party(ies)	
Year	No.	%	No.	%	No.	%
2024	214,406	41.76%	285,156	55.54%	13,824	2.69%
2020	199,922	38.61%	307,486	59.39%	10,349	2.00%
2016	180,543	38.90%	252,525	54.41%	31,076	6.70%
2012	157,204	35.24%	279,677	62.70%	9,168	2.06%
2008	165,391	35.06%	296,571	62.86%	9,804	2.08%
2004	169,046	38.67%	259,760	59.42%	8,328	1.91%
2000	130,555	31.91%	249,508	60.99%	29,049	7.10%
1996	104,683	26.82%	233,050	59.71%	52,551	13.46%
1992	131,601	29.02%	213,299	47.04%	108,578	23.94%
1988	177,761	43.93%	225,123	55.64%	1,736	0.43%
1984	212,080	51.66%	197,106	48.02%	1,306	0.32%
1980	154,793	37.20%	198,342	47.67%	62,937	15.13%
1976	181,249	44.08%	227,636	55.36%	2,285	0.56%
1972	220,383	53.00%	194,645	46.81%	780	0.19%
1968	122,359	31.78%	246,518	64.03%	16,123	4.19%
1964	74,615	19.13%	315,463	80.87%	13	0.00%
1960	147,502	36.37%	258,032	63.63%	1	0.00%
1956	225,819	58.23%	161,970	41.77%	2	0.00%
1952	210,935	50.89%	203,293	49.05%	270	0.07%
1948	135,787	41.44%	188,736	57.59%	3,179	0.97%
1944	123,487	41.26%	175,356	58.59%	433	0.14%
1940	138,653	43.17%	182,182	56.73%	313	0.10%
1936	125,031	40.18%	165,238	53.10%	20,909	6.72%
1932	115,266	43.31%	146,604	55.08%	4,300	1.62%
1928	117,522	49.55%	118,973	50.16%	699	0.29%
1924	125,286	59.63%	76,606	36.46%	8,223	3.91%
1920	107,463	63.97%	55,062	32.78%	5,456	3.25%
1916	44,858	51.08%	40,394	46.00%	2,564	2.92%
1912	27,703	35.56%	30,412	39.04%	19,779	25.39%
1908	43,942	60.76%	24,706	34.16%	3,669	5.07%
1904	41,605	60.60%	24,839	36.18%	2,212	3.22%
1900	33,784	59.74%	19,812	35.04%	2,952	5.22%
1896	37,437	68.33%	14,459	26.39%	2,889	5.27%
1892	26,975	50.71%	24,336	45.75%	1,885	3.54%
1888	21,969	53.88%	17,530	42.99%	1,276	3.13%
1884	19,030	58.07%	12,391	37.81%	1,350	4.12%
1880	18,195	62.24%	10,779	36.87%	261	0.89%
1876	15,787	59.29%	10,712	40.23%	128	0.48%
1872	13,665	71.94%	5,329	28.06%	0	0.00%
1868	12,993	66.49%	6,548	33.51%	0	0.00%
1864	13,962	62.24%	8,470	37.76%	0	0.00%
1860	12,244	61.37%	7,707	38.63%	0	0.00%
1856	11,467	57.85%	6,680	33.70%	1,675	8.45%
1852	7,626	44.85%	8,735	51.37%	644	3.79%
1848	6,779	60.77%	3,646	32.68%	730	6.54%
1844	7,322	59.55%	4,867	39.58%	107	0.87%
1840	5,278	61.22%	3,301	38.29%	42	0.49%
1836	2,710	47.76%	2,964	52.24%	0	0.00%
1832	2,810	56.93%	2,126	43.07%	0	0.00%
1828	2,754	77.03%	821	22.97%	0	0.00%
1824	2,145	91.47%	0	0.00%	200	8.53%

Democrats hold all statewide and congressional seats including Governor Daniel McKee, Lt. Governor Sabina Matos, House Speaker K. Joseph Shekarchi, Senate President Valarie Lawson, U.S. Representatives Gabe Amo and Seth Magaziner, U.S. Senators Jack Reed and Sheldon Whitehouse, Secretary of State Gregg Amore, General Treasurer James Diossa, and Senate Majority Leader Michael McCaffrey.

In a 2020 study, Rhode Island was ranked as the 19th easiest state for citizens to vote in.

Party registration as of February 2021
Party	Total voters	Percentage
Unaffiliated	348,569	43.18%
Democratic	346,320	42.90%
Republican	112,334	13.92%
Total	807,223	100%

== History ==
=== Federalists vs. Anti-Federalists (1776–1820) ===
Rhode Island declared independence from the British Empire on May 4, 1776, two months before the U.S. Declaration of Independence was ratified. However, despite this eagerness for independence, Rhode Island was also a stronghold for Anti-Federalism through the Country Party, which was widely popular among rural areas of Rhode Island and dominated the Rhode Island General Assembly from 1786 to 1790. The Country Party's dominance prevented ratification of the Federalist U.S. Constitution, and the state had even refused to send any delegation to the 1787 Constitutional Convention that wrote it. Father of the Constitution James Madison described Rhode Island as ruled by "wickedness and folly" in which "All sense of character as well as of right have been obliterated." After the insurance of the inclusion of a bill of rights, however, support grew for the Constitution in Rhode Island. Rhode Island became the last of the original 13 states to ratify the Constitution in 1790 by only 2 votes, after Gov. John Collins supported it and several remaining Anti-Federalists boycotted the ratifying convention.

After ratification, many Anti-Federalists remained with the Country Party or joined Thomas Jefferson's Anti-Administration faction, which eventually became the Democratic-Republican Party. Rhode Island's first 2 governors after ratification (Anti-Federalist leader Arthur Fenner and Henry Smith) were both nominees of the Country Party. Meanwhile, one of Rhode Island's first 2 senators, Joseph Stanton Jr., was a nominee of the Anti-Administration Party.

Despite the Anti-Federalist views during the 1780s, the Federalist Party eventually became the dominant party in Rhode Island. Rhode Island gave its electoral votes in most Presidential elections to the Federalist candidate during this era. Meanwhile, Federalist Senator William Bradford became the 1st U.S. Senator from Rhode Island to serve as President pro tempore of the United States Senate during the 5th Congress. While the Federalist Party is generally considered to have died after the War of 1812, Rhode Island still had Federalists in the U.S. Congress as late as 1820, and Federalist Governor William Jones was not defeated by a Democratic-Republican candidate until Nehemiah R. Knight was elected in 1816.

=== Democratic-Republican Era (1820s) ===
In the 1820s, Rhode Island, like the rest of the union, was largely dominated by the Democratic-Republican Party. Knight, William C. Gibbs, and James Fenner (son of former Governor Arthur Fenner) were all elected Governors of Rhode Island during this time. After the party split into Andrew Jackson's Democratic Party and the opposition National Republican Party, Rhode Island was generally opposed to Jackson's policies and supportive of the Federalist-inspired policies of National Republican leaders John Quincy Adams and Henry Clay, supporting the former in the hotly contested Presidential elections of 1824 and 1828. Many of these "Anti-Jacksonians" or "Adams Men", such as Asher Robbins and former Governor Nehemiah R. Knight, represented the state in Congress before the formation of the Whig Party in 1833.

=== Whig Era (1833–1850) ===
Rhode Island Congressmen were almost exclusively Whigs during the 1830s and early 1840s. Whigs Lemuel H. Arnold, Elisha Harris, Henry B. Anthony, and William W. Hoppin were also Governors of Rhode Island during this time. However, Democrats John Brown Francis and William Sprague III served for most of the 1830s. Rhode Island's electoral votes also backed the Presidential candidacies of Whig leaders William Henry Harrison in 1840, Henry Clay in 1844, and Zachary Taylor in 1848.

==== Dorr Rebellion (1840–1842) ====
In 1841, Rhode Island was the last state to still require ownership of property to vote in its elections, as it was still governed by the provisions of its original colonial charter of 1663, which restricted voting rights to landowning white men and their eldest sons. About 60% of Rhode Island adult men were ineligible to vote due to these restrictions by 1840. Political activist Thomas Wilson Dorr was the leader of a group known as the Rhode Island Suffrage Association (or "Dorrites") that attempted to amend or replace the charter with a new constitution extending suffrage to all white men, but efforts to do so consistently failed in the Rhode Island General Assembly.

After failed attempts to change the system from within, the Dorrites held a convention for the newly formed "People's Party", which drafted a new constitution that enfranchised all white men after one year's residence. Meanwhile, General Assembly members who supported the charter, known as "Charterites" or the "Law and Order Party", drafted a constitution that made concessions to the People's Party, but two referendums held later that year determined that a majority of voters approved of the People's Party constitution, but disapproved of the Law and Order Party's constitution by a narrow margin.

However, Governor Samuel Ward King, a Charterite, refused to recognize the results of the referendums, resulting in the holding of two elections that April: one set up by the People's Party, which elected Dorr as governor, and another set up by the Law and Order Party, which re-elected King. King and Dorr essentially served as governors concurrently after this election. King declared martial law and attempted to persuade U.S. President John Tyler to send federal soldiers to Rhode Island to resolve the issue, but Tyler, feeling that the threat of violence was "hourly diminishing", refused. Without the threat of federal interference, Dorr's government mounted an attack upon the Providence Arsenal on May 19, 1842. Charterite defenders, including Dorr's own father and uncle, suppressed the attack and the Dorrites retreated to the village of Chepachet to hold another People's Convention. Charterites cut off the retreat in the city of Woonsocket, causing Dorr's government to fall.

Despite their victory, the Charterite General Assembly ultimately drafted and adopted the current Rhode Island Constitution in September 1842, which extended voting to all free men (of any race) who owned property or could pay a $1 poll tax. Although the former members of the People's Party attempted to oppose the Law-and-Order Party's candidates in the 1843 elections, the Law-and-Order Party took all major offices in these elections, and their new constitution was adopted in May. Encouraged by the new constitution's expanded suffrage, Dorr returned to the state but was captured by King and tried and convicted of treason. However, public protests resulted in Dorr's pardon by Governor James Fenner in 1845.

==== Law and Order Party and Whig Party co-dominance (1840s) ====
After the Dorr Rebellion ended, the Law-and-Order Party shared power with the Whigs for the remainder of the 1840s, until the former dissolved and the latter fell from power in Rhode Island. The Law-and-Order Party's James Fenner was the first governor elected under the Rhode Island Constitution. Fenner had previously served as governor on two other occasions as a member of the Democratic-Republican Party. Byron Diman also represented the Law-and-Order Party as governor.

In 1843, Rhode Island was given a 2nd Congressional district. The Law-and-Order Party's Elisha R. Potter was the first Congressman from this district. The 2nd district also elected Benjamin Babock Thurston to Congress in 1847; Thurston was the first Democrat elected to Congress from Rhode Island.

In the late 1840s and early 1850s, the nationally declining Whig Party became diminished in Rhode Island, while the Law and Order Party dissolved, and most of its members returned to their pre-Dorr Rebellion allegiances to the Whigs or Democrats.

=== Republican Era (1850s–1930s) ===
After the demise of the Rhode Island Whigs, the Know Nothing and Democratic Parties were briefly co-dominant parties in Rhode Island. From 1851 to 1853, Rhode Island had an all-Democrat set of executive offices for the first time, led by Governor Philip Allen. In the same year, Charles Tillinghast James became Rhode Island's first Democratic Senator. Meanwhile, Benjamin Babock Thurston returned to his Congressional seat as a Know-Nothing, and William W. Hoppin was Rhode Island's only Know-Nothing governor in 1854, serving in the office until 1856.

In the late 1850s, however, much of the remaining Know-Nothings and Whigs nationally were absorbed by the Republican Party, which would become the dominant party in Rhode Island until the Great Depression of the 1930s. Republican dominance in Rhode Island began with the elections of several Republicans to major offices in 1857, such as Governor Elisha Dyer, and Sen. James F. Simmons. The first 14 Republican Party Presidential candidates, beginning with John C. Frémont in 1856, won Rhode Island's electoral votes during this era.

The Constitutional Union Party became strong in Rhode Island during the early 1860s. Across the country, many conservative former Whigs and Know-Nothings, unsatisfied with the secessionists in the national Democratic Party, became Unionists, and nominated Unionist candidates at their state conventions. Both Rhode Island representatives to the 37th U.S. House of Representatives were Unionists.

During the American Civil War, Rhode Island was the first state to respond to President Abraham Lincoln's 1861 request for troops from the individual Union states. Governor William Sprague IV (nephew of former Governor William Sprague III) believed that the war would be over rather quickly and easily in the Union's favor, and chose to lead the Rhode Island brigade to Virginia to oversee what he expected to be a Union victory. There, he participated in the First Battle of Bull Run and, despite the Confederate victory, was offered a commission as Brigadier General, which he refused, opting to remain Governor of Rhode Island. Sprague went on to serve 2 six-year terms as a Senator from Rhode Island after retiring from the Governor's post in 1863. Burnside also became a Governor of Rhode Island from 1866 to 1869, and then replaced Sprague in the U.S. Senate in 1875, serving there until his death in 1881.

From 1863 to 1887, every governor of and U.S. Congressman from Rhode Island was a member of the Republican Party. During this time, Senator Henry B. Anthony served as President pro tempore of the United States Senate, the 2nd Rhode Island Senator to do so, after William Bradford in 1797. Also during this time, Governor Henry Lippitt became the first in a familial line of several prominent Rhode Island politicians, dating to Governor Lincoln Chafee, and including one of Lippitt's sons, Sen. Henry F. Lippitt, who was a brother-in-law of U.S. president and Chief Justice William Howard Taft. Also, the administration of three-term Governor Alfred H. Littlefield officially established the current boundary line of Rhode Island and Massachusetts, and authorized the establishment of the state's first industrial school for impoverished children, in an effort to update the state's education system to keep in time with manufacturing developments.

In 1887, some Democratic power returned when prominent Democratic businessman John W. Davis was elected governor over incumbent Republican George P. Wetmore, with whom many in both parties were dissatisfied. During Davis' first one-year term, a women's suffrage amendment to the State Constitution was passed by the state legislature but not accepted by the state's male voters in an April 6, 1887 referendum. Also during Davis' first term, the current boundary line with Connecticut was established, revised election laws were passed which made voter fraud more difficult, and orphanages were regulated by the state. However, Davis was defeated in his 1888 and 1889 gubernatorial bids, but Davis returned to the governorship for another one-year term in 1890. Another popular Democrat during Rhode Island's Republican Era was Lucius F.C. Garvin, a longtime General Assembly member from Cumberland and eventual governor, serving two one-year terms. However, a Republican-controlled legislature prevented most of Garvin's reform-minded programs from passing. Garvin was considered for the Democratic nomination for U.S. president in 1904.

In the late 19th century and early 20th century, there was much controversy in the state political system surrounding Republican leader and lobbyist Charles R. Brayton, who generally supported the interests of Republican senators Henry B. Anthony and Nelson W. Aldrich. As both a Civil War veteran and a member of the state's "economic elite", Brayton was easily supported by the majority of Rhode Islanders, and is credited with helping many candidates into office, including Sen. Aldrich, who would later become one of the most prominent U.S. Senators. Brayton rose to political prominence in Rhode Island in the 1890s as a chairman of the Republican State Committee, and eventually as a member of the Republican National Committee. Brayton campaigned heavily for the passage of laws shifting gubernatorial powers, including almost all appointment powers, to the State Senate, which was reliably a Republican majority. The "Brayton Act" was a major hindrance to Democratic reformers such as Governor Garvin after its passage, and would continue to hinder gubernatorial power until Democrats gained a State Senate majority in 1935. Brayton also had a political rivalry with James H. Higgins, another Democratic governor during Rhode Island's Republican Era. Higgins greatly opposed Brayton's lobbying, claiming Brayton was paid by railroad and telephone companies to lobby their special interests. Brayton did not deny this, but said that he never lobbied against the interests of the Republican Party to favor a corporation's interest.

In 1912, President Taft's reelection campaign was the first Republican campaign to not receive Rhode Island's electoral votes, despite the fact that he was a 5th cousin of former Governor Royal C. Taft. Democrat Woodrow Wilson, who won the election, was the first Democrat to receive Rhode Island's electoral votes since Franklin Pierce in 1852, before the founding of the Republican Party.

Also in 1912, the Republican ticket for executive offices, led by Aram J. Pothier, who was also the first Rhode Island governor of foreign birth (born in Quebec), won the first 2-year executive terms, having previously served four 1-year terms.

Upon the beginning of the Great Depression in 1929, Republican Norman S. Case was Governor of Rhode Island. Although he was reelected in 1930, the Depression worsened and Republican popularity lessened, and Theodore F. Green summarily defeated Case in 1932. The Depression is generally cited as the primary reason for the fall of Republicans in Rhode Island, transitioning to a period of Democratic dominance which continues today.

=== Democratic Era (1930s–present) ===
In the 1932 and 1934 elections, Democrats officially swept Republicans out of power in the state. Theodore F. Green easily defeated Republican Governor Norman S. Case in the 1932 gubernatorial election. Democrat Peter G. Gerry, who served 2 terms in the U.S. Senate before the Depression, reclaimed his former seat by defeating incumbent Republican Senator Felix Hebert. In the State Senate elections in 1934, 2 seats were contested, both held by Republicans, but Democratic victories in these districts would create a Democratic Party majority in the Senate. Lt. Gov. Robert Quinn, assigned to preside over seating the newly elected State Senators, refused to seat the Republicans who had claimed re-election to those two seats. Green demanded a recount on January 1, 1935, and the recount determined that the Democratic candidates in both districts had won by narrow margins. This has become known as the "Bloodless Revolution", as Republicans have struggled to regain power in Rhode Island since.

Republicans remained in some power throughout the 1930s, as Charles Risk served the 1st Congressional district in the 74th and 76th Congresses. In 1938, many Republicans, led by gubernatorial candidate William Henry Vanderbilt III, was elected into office, including retaking control of both houses of the General Assembly. However, in 1939, Vanderbilt's support was seriously weakened by a wire-tapping scandal involving a private detective he had hired to search for election fraud. The scandal cost him his re-election chances, and many Republicans elected in 1938 were defeated by Democratic challengers in 1940; Democrats also regained a majority in both houses of the General Assembly, and have not lost it since.

Meanwhile, many prominent Rhode Island Democrats also became nationally prominent under Democratic Presidents Franklin D. Roosevelt and Harry S. Truman. The most notable of these was former Governor Green, who successfully ran for Senate in 1936, and served there until 1960, finally retiring in ill health at age 93, the oldest Congressman in history at the time. Green was known as "the President's man", as a strong supporter of Democratic Presidents, and one of Republican President Dwight D. Eisenhower's strongest Democratic supporters. Green was also a civil rights leader, working closely with then–Majority Leader Lyndon B. Johnson to pass voting rights bills, such as the Civil Rights Act of 1957. The state's largest airport is named T.F. Green Airport after him.

J. Howard McGrath, first a governor after defeating incumbent Vanderbilt in 1940, also went on to serve for many years in a federal capacity. McGrath was appointed U.S. Solicitor General by Truman in October 1945, and served there for one year, before resigning to become a senator in the 80th Congress, which had Republican majorities in both houses. However, he chaired the U.S. Senate Committee on the District of Columbia at the beginning of the Democrat-ruled 81st Congress. McGrath was also chairman of the Democratic National Committee during this time, allowing for racial integration of the Democrats' national headquarters and successfully managing President Truman's 1948 reelection campaign. For this, McGrath was promoted to United States Attorney General, until his resignation in 1952, after refusing to be investigated after suspected corruption.

With McGrath's resignation to become Solicitor-General, then–Lt. Gov. John O. Pastore became the first Italian-American governor in U.S. history, and would later become the first Italian-American U.S. Senator. As governor, Pastore enacted Rhode Island's first sales taxes, corporate income taxes, and primary election laws. Pastore retired from his post as governor upon winning a special election to replace McGrath in the U.S. Senate, where Pastore would serve until 1976, where he was famously involved in a 1969 Senate hearing on the funding of PBS in which famous public TV host Fred Rogers testified successfully against President Richard Nixon's proposed PBS funding cuts.

McGrath and Pastore were two of many Democrats who served lengthy amounts of time in the U.S. Senate or House of Representatives during their time. Between 1941 and 1976, Rhode Island sent only 11 different people to the U.S. Congress, all of them Democrats, including Pastore, McGrath, and Green. Other notables included: 12-term Rep. Aime Forand, who proposed the first bill for the program that eventually became Medicare; Rep. John E. Fogarty, who became a national political leader on medical research as a longtime member of the House Appropriations Committee; 14-term Rep. Fernand St. Germain, Rep. Forand's successor, who was involved in passing legislation that would ultimately be blamed for the savings and loan crisis of the 1980s–1990s. Back in Rhode Island itself, four-term Governor J. Joseph Garrahy became iconic for his handling of the Blizzard of 1978, during which Governor "Joe" kept a calm, casual, comforting demeanor while living at his State House office for about a week to manage the crisis and maintain order. Perhaps the most notable member of the Democratic dynasty of the 1940s–1970s, though, was Sen. Claiborne Pell.

Best known as the father of Pell Grants, Claiborne Pell was elected to the U.S. Senate after a lengthy career as a U.S. Department of State diplomat, during which time he had been involved in the drafting of the United Nations Charter. Pell was first elected in 1960 upon the retirement of T. F. Green, after defeating both former Gov. Dennis J. Roberts and former U.S. Attorney General J. Howard McGrath in the Democratic primary election. Senator Pell was considered eccentric by D.C. politicians due to his insistence on using only public transportation and low-cost automobiles, and supposed paranormal beliefs, and was often considered the least electable politician in Washington; however, Rhode Island would ultimately reelect him to the Senate five times. Sen. Pell is best remembered as the creator of "Basic Educational Opportunity Grants" in 1973 (now known as Pell Grants) which provide financial aid to American university students. Pell was also largely responsible for the creation of the National Endowment for the Arts and the National Endowment for the Humanities, and was chairman of the U.S. Senate Committee on Foreign Relations for eight years later in his tenure. Having served for 36 years upon his retirement, Claiborne Pell is the longest-serving U.S. Senator in Rhode Island history.

==== Return of Republicans and rise of third parties (1976–present) ====
In his 36 years in the Senate, Claiborne Pell served alongside only two other U.S. Senators from Rhode Island: John Pastore, and John Chafee, the first Republican U.S. Senator from Rhode Island in 40 years, and a prominent Rockefeller Republican. Chafee had previously served three two-year terms as governor in the 1960s; his administration was celebrated for championing public transportation and environmental conservation, but ended in a surprise reelection loss to Democrat Frank Licht after Chafee both reversed his anti-income tax stance and had to lessen his campaign efforts due to family matters. Chafee first ran for the U.S. Senate as a challenger Sen. Claiborne Pell in 1972, but Pell held the seat by a result of 54–46%. However, Chafee ran again in 1976 to replace the retiring Sen. John O. Pastore and defeated Democrat Richard Lorber 58–42%. Sen. Chafee broke with his own party on many issues, most notably on environmental issues, which Chafee made his main concern as a senator. Chafee authored the Coastal Barrier Resources Act that designated protected coastal areas that became ineligible to government development and was also instrumental to the passages of the Superfund program, the Clean Water Act and the Oil Pollution Act of 1990, and later chaired the U.S. Senate Committee on Environment and Public Works. Chafee was described as a moderate, but was among the most liberal U.S. Senators on social issues during his time. Upon his death in October 1999, Chafee was posthumously awarded the Presidential Medal of Freedom by President Bill Clinton, and his son Lincoln Chafee was appointed to replace his father; the elder Chafee had already announced his plans to retire at the end of his term and the younger Chafee had already announced his plans to run to succeed him.

Meanwhile, the Chafees' tenure in the U.S. Senate corresponded to some return to Republicans holding major state offices in Rhode Island, although the Democrats always held their majority in both houses of the General Assembly. In 1984, Republican Edward DiPrete was elected after Governor Garrahy's retirement and went on to serve 3 terms as governor despite the Democrats consistently holding over 85% of Assembly seats. However, DiPrete was widely suspected of corruption (and would later do time in prison for bribery, extortion, and racketeering), and ultimately lost in a landslide to Democrat Bruce Sundlun in 1990, the third time that Sundlun had challenged the incumbent DiPrete. Sundlun immediately closed 45 banks and credit unions due to the collapse of the RI Share and Deposit Indemnity Corporation (RISDIC) under DiPrete. Sundlun became a champion of improving infrastructure and tourism, working across the aisle with controversial Providence Mayor Buddy Cianci (who would also later do time in prison for "racketeering conspiracy", i.e. running the city of Providence as a criminal enterprise) to support the building of or improvement of key infrastructure such as the Rhode Island Convention Center, Quonset Air Museum, T.F. Green Airport, Providence Place Mall, and more. The work of the Cianci and Sundlun administrations launched what became known as the city of Providence's "Renaissance" period in which infrastructure, the arts, and the economy were all booming. Sundlun was the last Rhode Island governor to be elected to 2-year terms; beginning in 1994, governors (and all other state offices) would be elected for 4-year terms and limited to two such terms. In a surprising upset, Gov. Sundlun lost the 1994 Democratic primary to strongly liberal State Senator Myrth York, who was then defeated by Republican Lincoln Almond by a slim margin of 47–44% in the general election (third-party activist Robert J. Healey won 9%). Beginning with York's loss in 1994, Democrats would go on to lose five consecutive gubernatorial elections, despite maintaining their supermajorities in both houses of the General Assembly and Rhode Island's 4 electoral votes always going to Democratic candidates in Presidential election years during those 20 years.

Between Governor Almond and his successor, Gov. Donald Carcieri, Republicans held the Rhode Island governorship for the longest period of time (16 years) since the 19th century. Gov. Almond prioritized health care, making significant expansions to the public children's health care program Rite Care and making Rhode Island among the states with the highest percentage of people having health insurance. Almond was also instrumental in the creation of the Community College of Rhode Island's Newport campus funded by a bond referendum passed with the Governor's support in 2000, and made major investments to improve and modernize the University of Rhode Island, his alma mater. When Almond was term-limited in 2002, conservative businessman Donald Carcieri defeated party-endorsed Jim Bennett in the Republican primary and then defeated 3rd-time Democratic nominee Myrth York to become Almond's successor, and was thrust into the national spotlight early in his term by The Station nightclub fire of February 2003. Carcieri's governorship was characterized by conflicts with the General Assembly and organized labor, as Carcieri often attacked the state government's expansive welfare programs and history of corruption but could do little to enact changes due to the Democrat-controlled Assembly's ability to override his vetoes. The Assembly also overrode Carcieri's vetoes of bills to legalize medical marijuana and make progress on LGBT civil rights issues. The latter position was particularly controversial with Rhode Islanders; the year of Carcieri's first election, 2002, was also the year that Providence elected the first openly homosexual mayor of a U.S. state capital, David Cicilline, in a landslide election, and Carcieri won reelection in 2006 against Lt. Gov. Charles J. Fogarty by only 2 percentage points.

Also in 2006, Sen. Lincoln Chafee lost the seat that had been held by him or his father for 30 years. Former State Attorney General Sheldon Whitehouse defeated Chafee by a margin of 53.5–46.5% in an election that was part of a national swing to a Democratic majority in both houses of the U.S. Congress. Chafee, one of the most left-of-center Senators at the time, later admitted that his loss to Whitehouse was good for the country since it helped give the majority to the Democrats, and Chafee later disaffiliated from the Republican Party and announced a run for governor for 2010.

In the 2010 gubernatorial election, there were four major candidates: State Treasurer Frank T. Caprio for the Democrats, John Robitaille for the Republicans, former Sen. Lincoln Chafee as an independent, and businessman Ken Block, who had founded the Moderate Party of Rhode Island in 2009 to advocate for meaningful political, economic, and educational reform. The Moderate Party's founding involved a court battle for official recognition that ended in the overturning of several laws that made it much easier for third-party and independent candidates to gain ballot access in elections beginning in 2010. The four-way race gained international attention when President Barack Obama, to whom Chafee has been a political ally, refused to endorse a candidate, and Caprio publicly told the President of the United States to "take his endorsement and really shove it." Caprio's remark was decried by most Rhode Islanders (including fellow Democratic politicians such as Sen. Jack Reed and hurt his campaign such that, despite being a Democrat in a heavily Democratic state, he ultimately placed third with just 23% of the vote. Chafee won the race with 36%, just about 2.5 percentage points more than Robitaille, while Block earned 6.5%, enough to gain major party status for the Moderate Party. Chafee became Rhode Island's first independent governor since the 18th century. He also immediately proved to be a very unpopular governor, as 64% of Rhode Islanders voted for someone else. Chafee's approval ratings fell further when he proposed a variety of tax increases, and he stirred up national controversy when he stood by his decision to refer to the annual State House Christmas tree as a "Holiday Tree" in the name of separation of church and state. Among Gov. Chafee's accomplishments was passing LGBT marriage equality.

Also in 2010, Providence Mayor David Cicilline won the District 1 House of Representatives seat being vacated by retiring Rep. Patrick J. Kennedy, and fellow Democrat Angel Taveras won the election to succeed Cicilline as Mayor in a landslide. Shortly after taking office in 2011, Taveras discovered that he had inherited over $180 million in debt that Cicilline had largely hidden from the public through what was described by Providence City Council Finance Chairman John Igliozzi as "illusory revenue, borrowing and other tricks." Cicilline's approval ratings just a few months after winning federal office went below 20% as the vast majority of voters blamed Cicilline for the city's financial woes, which ultimately required controversial austerity-like measures to prevent the city of Providence from declaring bankruptcy. Rep. Cicilline was also accused by District 2 Rep. James Langevin of gerrymandering by tampering with the regular redrawing of district lines to ensure his own reelection in 2012, which, despite the controversies, Cicilline did win with 53% of the vote.

In 2014, Governor Chafee, having officially joined the Democratic Party in 2013 and facing massive unpopularity and likely primary challengers, chose not to run for reelection. The primaries in both parties were hotly contested: on the Democratic side, venture capitalist and State Treasurer Gina Raimondo, perceived as a fiscally center-right frontrunner, defeated Providence Mayor Angel Taveras and Clay Pell (grandson of the late Sen. Pell) after unions and other liberals divided almost evenly between the 2 more liberal challengers, while on the Republican side, Moderate Party founder Ken Block left his own party to run as a Republican, only to be defeated in the primary by conservative Cranston Mayor Allan Fung. Without Block, the Moderate Party had nominated James Spooner for governor, but when he became severely ill, Robert J. Healey, who had previously run for governor or lieutenant governor 6 times on the platform of his own "Cool Moose Party," was announced as the substitute nominee with less than 2 months until election day. Spending less than $40 in total and campaigning mostly through social media, a blog, and organizing charity fundraisers, Healey's "guerrilla campaign" stunned pundits and pollsters by winning 22% of the vote and even winning pluralities in a few towns. Ultimately, however, Raimondo defeated Fung to become Rhode Island's first female governor by a margin of 40–36%.

Meanwhile, the election to replace Taveras as Mayor of Providence saw former Mayor and convicted felon Buddy Cianci attempt to return to politics. The race was seen by many as a referendum on Cianci's legacy, with supporters pointing to the improved infrastructure, city parks, arts scene, and other gains associated with the city's "Renaissance" during Cianci's time as Mayor, while detractors pointed to Cianci's history of violent, criminal behavior and frank, less-than-remorseful admissions to using "public power for personal reasons." In a rare move into municipal politics, President Obama publicly endorsed Cianci's little-known Democratic challenger, Jorge Elorza, as did Sen. Sheldon Whitehouse, who, as a U.S. Attorney, oversaw the investigation that led to Cianci's racketeering charges and eventual conviction in 2002. Even the Republican nominee for Mayor, Dan Harrop, urged citizens to vote for his Democratic opponent Elorza, citing concerns that Cianci would not have the city's best interests at heart. Ultimately, Elorza proved victorious by a margin of 53–44% over Cianci. It was the first election that Cianci has ever lost.

Joe Biden continued the Democratic trend in Rhode Island, carrying the state by 20.8 points, or 107,564 votes. Republican Donald Trump carried the crucial Catholic vote (50% to Biden's 49%), who comprised 52% of the electorate, the most of any state. Catholics were once a reliable Democratic constituency, but have become competitive in recent elections due to their social conservatism.

== Issues ==
Rhode Island has comprehensive health insurance for low-income children, and a large social safety net. Many urban areas still have a high rate of children in poverty. Due to an influx of residents from Boston, Massachusetts, increasing housing costs have resulted in more homeless in Rhode Island.

== Minor parties ==
=== Moderate Party ===
The Moderate Party of Rhode Island is the third-largest contemporary political party in the U.S. state of Rhode Island, after the Democratic Party and the Republican Party. The Moderate Party of Rhode Island gained official party status and ballot access via a federal lawsuit and the gathering of 34,000 signatures on August 18, 2009.

In August 2018, Tony Jones was appointed to the North Kingstown School Committee making him the first-ever Moderate in public office.

== Defunct parties ==
=== People's Party ===
A party briefly created in the Rhode Island Voting Crisis, leading to the Dorr Rebellion. The party was founded by Thomas Dorr, as an alternative to the old-guard legislature which enforced strict voting restrictions.

== Federal representation ==
Rhode Island currently has two House districts. In the 118th Congress, both of Rhode Island's seats are held by Democrats:

- Rhode Island's 1st congressional district represented by Gabe Amo (D)
- Rhode Island's 2nd congressional district represented by Seth Magaziner (D)

Rhode Island's two United States senators are Democrats Jack Reed and Sheldon Whitehouse, serving since 1997 and 2007, respectively.

Rhode Island is part of the United States District Court for the District of Rhode Island in the federal judiciary. The district's cases are appealed to the Boston-based United States Court of Appeals for the First Circuit.

== See also ==
- 2020 Rhode Island elections
- Government of Rhode Island
- United States presidential elections in Rhode Island
- Women's suffrage in Rhode Island
