= 2002 Rhode Island gubernatorial election =

- November 5, 2002
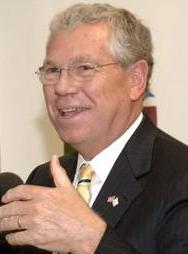

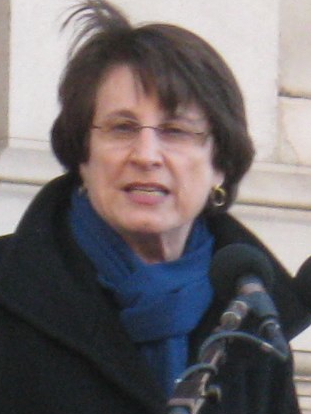
Nominee	Donald Carcieri	Myrth York
Party	Republican	Democratic
Popular vote	181,827	150,229
Percentage	54.76%	45.24%
- Carcieri: 50–60% 60–70% 70–80% York: 50–60% 60–70%
Governor before election
Lincoln Almond
Republican
Elected Governor
Donald Carcieri
Republican

The 2002 Rhode Island gubernatorial election took place on November 5, 2002. Incumbent Republican governor Lincoln Almond was term-limited. Republican Donald Carcieri won the open seat, defeating Democrat Myrth York.

In the Republican primary election, Carcieri defeated James Bennett, who had won the endorsement of the state Republican Party.

The 2002 campaign was particularly costly to York as she spent $3.8 million of her own money to finance what was to be her last bid for elected office. A key turning point in the campaign was when York criticized Carcieri for the actions of businesses he had been associated with but refused to answer Carcieri's request that she reveal what companies her personal assets were invested in.

== Republican primary ==
A Republican primary was held on September 10.

=== Candidates ===
- Donald Carcieri, businessman
- Jim Bennett

=== Results ===
Republican primary results
Party	Candidate	Votes	%
Republican	Donald Carcieri	17,227	66.91
Republican	James S. Bennett	8,518	33.09
Total votes		25,745	100.00

==== Results by county ====
Results by county Carcieri: Carcieri—50–60%; Carcieri—60–70%; Carcieri—70–80%

County	Donald Carcieri		James S. Bennett		Total votes cast
County	#	%	#	%	Total votes cast
Bristol	1,337	67.15%	654	32.85%	1,991
Kent	4,529	77.01%	1,352	22.99%	5,881
Newport	2,055	58.56%	1,454	41.44%	3,509
Providence	6,091	62.00%	3,733%	38.00%	9,824
Washington	3,306	70.19%	1,404	29.81%	4,710
Totals	17,227	66.91%	8,518	33.09%	25,745

==== Results by municipality ====
Results by municipality Carcieri: Carcieri—50–60%; Carcieri—60–70%; Carcieri—70–80%; Carcieri—80–90%; Bennett: Bennett—50–60%; Bennett—70–80%

Municipality	Donald Carcieri		James S. Bennett		Total votes cast	Turnout
Municipality	#	%	#	%	Total votes cast	%
Barrington	796	70.38%	335	29.62%	1,131	12.3%
Bristol	344	65.77%	179	34.23%	523	5.4%
Burrillville	121	54.02%	103	45.98%	224	3.2%
Central Falls	44	64.71%	24	35.29%	68	2.9%
Charlestown	130	43.77%	167	56.23%	297	6.3%
Coventry	490	67.96%	231	32.04%	721	4.1%
Cranston	1,229	66.61%	616	33.39%	1,845	5.2%
Cumberland	366	59.51%	249	40.49%	615	4.9%
East Greenwich	1,431	89.94%	160	10.06%	1,591	19.3%
East Providence	539	64.24%	300	35.76%	839	5.7%
Exeter	288	71.64%	114	28.36%	402	14.3%
Foster	113	69.75%	49	30.25%	162	6.4%
Glocester	145	71.78%	57	28.22%	202	3.9%
Hopkinton	88	49.16%	91	50.84%	179	4.5%
Jamestown	300	68.18%	140	31.82%	440	13.5%
Johnston	134	67.00%	66	33.00%	200	2.5%
Lincoln	1,089	56.60%	835	43.40%	1,924	18.9%
Little Compton	164	66.67%	82	33.33%	246	11.3%
Middletown	309	62.30%	187	37.70%	496	7.1%
Narragansett	438	71.69%	173	28.31%	611	6.2%
New Shoreham	11	24.44%	34	75.56%	45	4.6%
Newport	381	55.22%	309	44.78%	690	8.0%
North Kingstown	1,380	85.29%	238	14.71%	1,618	10.9%
North Providence	244	74.85%	82	25.15%	326	3.0%
North Smithfield	223	48.48%	237	51.52%	460	7.9%
Pawtucket	328	56.36%	254	43.64%	582	3.2%
Portsmouth	704	54.15%	596	45.85%	1,300	15.2%
Providence	629	64.12%	352	35.88%	981	2.2%
Richmond	149	68.98%	67	31.02%	216	5.8%
Scituate	316	69.60%	138	30.40%	454	7.7%
Smithfield	377	65.00%	203	35.00%	580	5.8%
South Kingstown	543	64.18%	303	35.82%	846	6.4%
Tiverton	197	58.46%	140	41.54%	337	4.7%
Warren	106	63.46%	61	36.53%	167	2.6%
Warwick	2,046	73.32%	783	27.68%	2,829	7.8%
West Greenwich	279	56.25%	217	43.75%	496	9.8%
West Warwick	207	76.10%	65	23.90%	272	4.2%
Westerly	355	75.85%	113	24.15%	468	4.4%
Woonsocket	194	53.59%	168	46.41%	362	2.9%
Totals	17,227	66.91%	8,518	33.09%	25,745	6.3%

== Democratic primary ==
A Democratic primary was held on September 10.

=== Candidates ===
- Antonio J. Pires, former Rhode Island state representative.
- Sheldon Whitehouse, Attorney General of Rhode Island, former U.S. attorney for the District of Rhode Island
- Myrth York, former Rhode Island senator, 1994 and 1998 Democratic nominee for governor

=== Polling ===
Poll source	Date(s) administered	Sample size	Margin of error	Pires	Whitehouse	York	Undecided
Taubman Center for Public Policy	August 31-September 2, 2002	437	± 5.0%	13%	26%	32%	29%

=== Results ===
Results by county York: York—30–40%; York—40–50%; Whitehouse: Whitehouse—30–40%; Whitehouse—40–50%

Results by municipality York: York—30–40%; York—40–50%; York—50–50%; York—60–70%; Whitehouse: Whitehouse—30–40%; Whitehouse—40–50%; Whitehouse—50–60%; Pires: Pires—30–40%; Pires—40–50%

Democratic primary results
Party	Candidate	Votes	%
Democratic	Myrth York	46,806	39.16
Democratic	Sheldon Whitehouse	45,880	38.39
Democratic	Antonio J. Pires	26,838	22.45
Total votes		119,524	100.00

==== Results by county ====
County	Antonio J. Pires		Sheldon Whitehouse		Myrth York		Total votes cast
County	#	%	#	%	#	%	Total votes cast
Bristol	1,277	27.67%	1,682	36.45%	1,656	35.88%	4,615
Kent	3,014	19.31%	6,265	40.13%	6,333	40.56%	15,612
Newport	1,032	15.41%	2,943	43.93%	2,724	40.66%	6,699
Providence	19,404	24.13%	30,311	37.70%	30,687	38.17%	80,402
Washington	2,111	17.31%	4,679	38.37%	5,406	44.33%	12,196
Totals	26,838	22.45%	45,880	38.39%	46,806	39.16%	119,524

==== Results by municipality ====
Municipality	Antonio J. Pires		Sheldon Whitehouse		Myrth York		Total votes cast	Turnout
Municipality	#	%	#	%	#	%	Total votes cast	%
Barrington	278	17.46%	692	43.47%	622	39.07%	1,592	16.5%
Bristol	710	35.52%	642	32.12%	647	32.37%	1,999	15.8%
Burrillville	194	17.67%	436	39.71%	468	42.62%	1,098	12.8%
Central Falls	593	40.15%	362	24.51%	522	35.34%	1,477	29.0%
Charlestown	75	15.89%	168	35.59%	229	48.52%	472	10.1%
Coventry	577	20.67%	1,061	38.02%	1,153	41.31%	2,791	13.5%
Cranston	1,843	19.68%	3,818	40.76%	3,706	39.56%	9,367	20.5%
Cumberland	2,005	39.87%	1,699	33.78%	1,325	26.35%	5,029	24.9%
East Greenwich	155	18.15%	337	39.46%	362	42.39%	854	10.6%
East Providence	2,025	33.65%	1,878	31.21%	2,114	35.13%	6,017	24.6%
Exeter	61	16.18%	146	38.73%	170	45.09%	377	11.5%
Foster	41	17.23%	85	35.71%	112	47.06%	238	9.3%
Glocester	96	18.64%	219	42.52%	200	38.83%	515	8.9%
Hopkinton	25	8.56%	136	46.58%	131	44.86%	292	6.7%
Jamestown	150	16.78%	348	38.93%	396	44.30%	894	23.9%
Johnston	1,193	19.24%	2,817	45.44%	2,190	35.32%	6,200	31.7%
Lincoln	770	32.24%	902	37.77%	716	29.98%	2,388	18.9%
Little Compton	48	16.27%	136	46.10%	111	37.63%	295	13.3%
Middletown	138	14.35%	420	43.66%	404	42.00%	962	12.2%
Narragansett	663	22.29%	1,208	40.62%	1,103	37.09%	2,974	24.3%
New Shoreham	15	16.13%	20	21.51%	58	62.37%	93	7.8%
Newport	258	11.34%	1,171	51.47%	846	37.19%	2,275	20.2%
North Kingstown	432	17.92%	915	37.95%	1,064	44.13%	2,411	14.8%
North Providence	1,163	19.77%	2,830	48.10%	1,891	32.14%	5,884	23.5%
North Smithfield	263	21.06%	567	45.40%	419	33.55%	1,249	17.6%
Pawtucket	4,348	49.49%	1,891	21.53%	2,546	28.98%	8,785	25.6%
Portsmouth	258	17.40%	587	39.58%	638	43.02%	1,483	15.3%
Providence	3,726	14.23%	10,035	38.34%	12,414	47.43%	26,175	28.7%
Richmond	52	14.09%	128	34.69%	189	51.22%	369	9.0%
Scituate	141	24.06%	214	36.52%	231	39.42%	586	10.0%
Smithfield	453	23.03%	810	41.18%	704	35.79%	1,967	15.9%
South Kingstown	575	16.45%	1,213	34.70%	1,708	48.86%	3,496	22.4%
Tiverton	180	22.78%	281	35.57%	329	41.65%	790	8.3%
Warren	289	28.22%	348	33.98%	387	37.79%	1,024	12.8%
Warwick	1,719	19.08%	3,571	39.64%	3,719	41.28%	9,009	17.2%
West Greenwich	57	20.21%	113	40.07%	112	39.72%	282	9.8%
West Warwick	506	18.91%	1,183	44.21%	987	36.88%	2,676	18.5%
Westerly	213	12.44%	745	43.52%	754	44.04%	1,712	13.0%
Woonsocket	550	16.05%	1,748	51.01%	1,129	32.94%	3,427	17.7%
Totals	26,838	22.45%	45,880	38.39%	46,806	39.16%	119,524	20.4%

== General election ==
=== Predictions ===
Source	Ranking	As of
The Cook Political Report	Tossup	October 31, 2002
Sabato's Crystal Ball	Lean D (flip)	November 4, 2002

=== Polling ===
Poll source	Date(s) administered	Sample size (Note: Key: A – all adults RV – registered voters LV – likely voters V – unclear)	Margin of error	Donald Carcieri (R)	Myrth York (D)	Other / Undecided
SurveyUSA	October 28–30, 2002	593 (LV)	± 4.2%	48%	45%	7%

=== Results ===
Rhode Island gubernatorial election, 2002
Party	Candidate	Votes	%	±%
Republican	Donald Carcieri	181,827	54.76%	+3.76%
Democratic	Myrth York	150,229	45.24%	+3.24%
Majority		31,598	9.52%	+0.52%
Turnout		332,056		
Republican hold		Swing		

==== By county ====
	Donald Carcieri Republican		Myrth York Democratic	
County	Votes	%	Votes	%
Bristol	10,707	58.6%	7,555	41.4%
Kent	36,470	60.2%	24,139	39.8%
Newport	17,008	57.8%	12,408	42.2%
Providence	89,697	50.5%	87,818	49.5%
Washington	27,945	60.4%	18,309	39.6%
