= Senator Fogarty =

Senator Fogarty may refer to:

- Charles Fogarty (born 1955), Rhode Island State Senate
- Paul Fogarty (born 1957), Rhode Island State Senate
