= Governor Almond =

Governor Almond may refer to:

- J. Lindsay Almond (1898–1986), Governor of Virginia
- Lincoln Almond (1936–2023), Governor of Rhode Island
