= Cool Moose Party =

Defunct political party in Rhode Island

- Founder: Robert J. Healey
- Founded: 1994
- Headquarters: Rhode Island, U.S.
- Ideology: Anti-establishment; Constitutionalism; Fiscal conservatism Libertarianism

The Cool Moose Party was a political party in the U.S. state of Rhode Island. Founded in 1994 by perennial candidate Robert J. Healey, it was the state's third-largest political party from 1994 to 2002. Described as having "a very libertarian slant", the party's official campaign platform focused on reducing government involvement in policymaking.

The party received 39.2% of the vote in the 2010 Rhode Island lieutenant gubernatorial election, marking one of the best third-party performances in a statewide election. The Providence Journal described the party's electoral history as "respectable, if not spectacular".

== History ==
The Cool Moose Party was formed in 1994 by perennial candidate Robert J. Healey, who had previously run for governor of Rhode Island in 1986 and 1994 as an independent. Rhode Island permits the use of political party designations, meaning Healey's party affiliation appeared on the ballot as 'Cool Moose Party' despite the party not yet having official recognition in the state. Healey received around 9% of the vote in the 1994 election, giving the Cool Moose Party ballot access in future Rhode Island elections.

Healey stated that Ross Perot's 1992 presidential campaign inspired the creation of the party, which he positioned as an alternative option for disgruntled voters. In 1995, the party held their first political convention at the Community College of Rhode Island. According to former party activist Algernon D'Ammassa, the party membership at this time featured a wide variety of political views, including "people in combat fatigues, gun rights people, socialists and Green Party people"; however, it ultimately settled on a libertarian ethos. The convention officially elected Healey as party chairman.

In 1996, the party ran over 20 candidates for a variety of offices, with two Cool Moose Party candidates winning seats on the Hopkinton town council. Healey resigned as party chairman in 1998, choosing instead to contest that year's gubernatorial election. Running on the campaign slogan "Healey for Governor. Why not? You've done worse", the party received around 6% of the vote. That same year, the Cool Moose Party successfully sued the state of Rhode Island to change its primary election laws to allow third-party candidates.

Healey first ran for lieutenant governor of Rhode Island as a Cool Moose Party candidate in 2002, receiving 18.8% of the vote after promising to abolish the position he was running for. After the 2002 election, the party lost official recognition from the state of Rhode Island. However, ran again in 2006, finishing in a distant third with 13.4% of the vote, de;pitthis was e the party spending less than US$1,000 on his candidacy and refusing to accept campaign donations.

=== 2010 Rhode Island lieutenant gubernatorial election ===
In 2010, Healey announced he would mount his third campaign for Rhode Island lieutenant governor. Despite the party no longer being officially recognized by the state of Rhode Island, Healey chose to list his party designation as 'Cool Moose Party'.

The party's campaign platform once again focused on abolishing the position of lieutenant governor, which Healey viewed as redundant. To demonstrate the party's view that the lieutenant governor had no responsibilities, Healey declared his candidacy from his beachfront home in Punta del Este, Uruguay, where he pledged that if elected, he would refuse to accept a salary or hire staff members.

During the campaign, the party distributed condoms reading "Robert Healey for Lt. Governor – Feels as though he's not even there". The party also produced wooden nickels for the campaign, which read "Coin Equal to the Value of Lt. Governor's Office ... Worthless".

Healey urged state Republicans to support his candidacy, and just days after becoming her party's nominee, Republican candidate Heidi Rogers withdrew from the race, citing support for the Cool Moose Party's plans to abolish the position of lieutenant governor. Healey finished in second place with 39.2% of the vote, receiving 126,063 votes and winning in ten (Note: Barrington; Bristol; Exeter; Foster; Glocester; Little Compton; Richmond; Scituate; Warren; West Greenwich) of Rhode Island's 39 municipalities.

== Platform ==
The Cool Moose Party was considered to be libertarian, and the party's policy platform advocated for reduced government intervention. The Providence Journal described the party as "populist at its core", with a focus on fiscal conservatism.

The party's 1995 policy platform criticized the power of labor unions and supported "minimiz[ing] labor's influence in the Legislature." The party advocated for the abolishment of the parole system, and suggested decriminalizing victimless crimes.

Viewing abortion through a libertarian lens, the party argued that because the Constitution of the United States does not explicitly prohibit or permit abortions, the government should maintain a "neutral position" on the issue. Cool Moose's party platform suggested a one-day waiting period for those seeking reproductive care, as well as the introduction of a mandatory consulting period for minors planning to have an abortion.

The party supported a voluntary universal health care system, arguing that while the option of universal health care should exist, it should not be mandatory. They supported assisted dying, and emphasized their belief in "the right to choose one's way of life".

The Cool Moose Party opposed regressive taxation and were in favor of abolishing local property tax. The party's 1995 policy platform supported lowering sin taxes and sales taxes, but advocated for the reintroduction of estate tax for high-income earners.

The party viewed welfare programs in the United States as a "failed policy", and advocated for increased private sector employment and the introduction of time limits for welfare benefits.
