= 2020 Rhode Island elections =

Rhode Island's General Election in 2020

- November 3, 2020

General elections were held in the U.S. state of Rhode Island on November 3, 2020. To vote by mail, registered Rhode Island voters must request a ballot by October 14, 2020.

== See also ==
- Elections in Rhode Island
- Politics of Rhode Island
- Political party strength in Rhode Island
