= Robert J. Healey =

American politician (1957–2016)

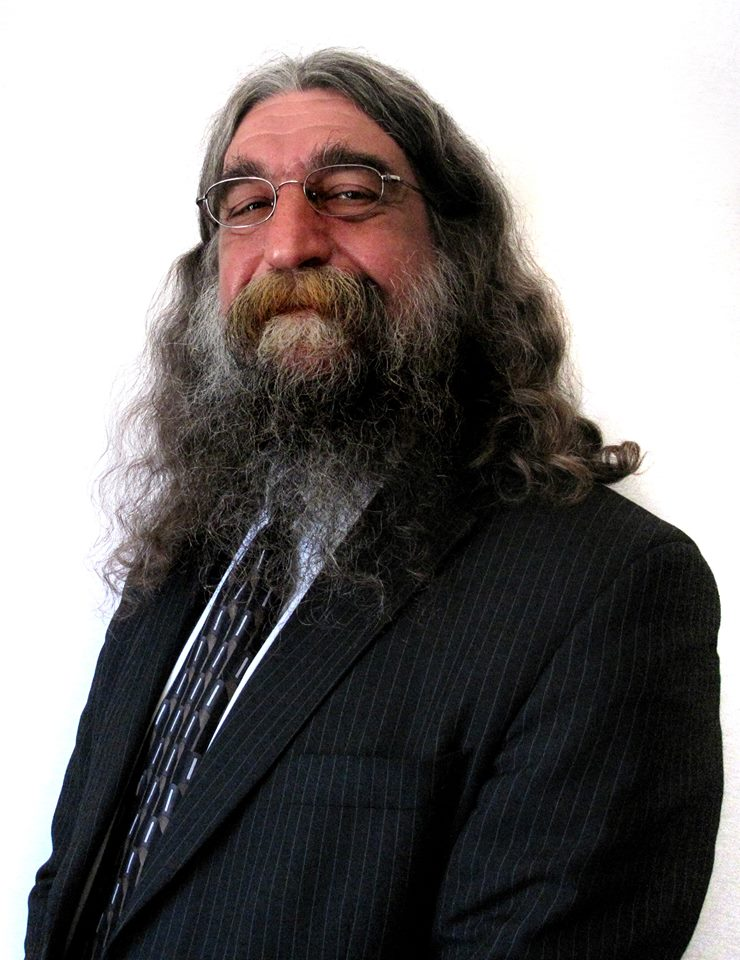
- Healey in 2014

Personal details
- Born: May 3, 1957 Providence, Rhode Island, U.S.
- Died: March 20, 2016 (aged 58) Barrington, Rhode Island, U.S.
- Party: Independent (before 1994); Cool Moose Party (1994–2014); Moderate (2014–2016)
- Education: Rhode Island College (BA); Boston University (MA); New England School of Law (JD); Northeastern University (MA); Columbia University
- Profession: Educator; Restaurateur
- Website: Campaign website

Robert J. Healey Jr. (May 3, 1957 – March 20, 2016) was an American attorney, businessman, and political activist. He was the founder of Rhode Island's Cool Moose Party, the state's third-largest political party from 1994 until 2002, and was a perennial candidate for statewide office. Healey ran for governor or lieutenant governor a total of seven times. Running as an independent candidate in 2010, he won 39% of the vote for lieutenant governor, running on a platform of abolishing the office. As the Moderate Party nominee for governor in 2014, Healey won 22% of the vote while spending less than $40 on the campaign.

== Early life, education and early career ==
Robert J. Healey was born in Providence, Rhode Island to Robert J. Healey Sr. and Mary (née Martinelli) Healey on May 3, 1957. His father was a plumber and his mother a factory worker. He grew up in Warren, Rhode Island, and graduated from Warren High School in 1975. He went on to earn a bachelor's degree in English and Secondary Education from Rhode Island College, a master's degree in Reading Education from Boston University (1980), a degree in law from the New England School of Law (1983), and a master's degree in English literature from Northeastern University (1985). In 1983 he began a PhD program at Columbia University, but after he had completed all the requirements, his dissertation supervisor died and he could not find a replacement.

He was elected to the Warren School Committee in 1982, serving as chairman until 1986. His election slogan was "A Strange Man for a Strange Job". He ran for governor as an independent in 1986. After his first run for governor, he was also secretary of the Bristol County Bar association.

== Cool Moose Party ==
The Cool Moose Party (CMP) was founded by Healey in 1994 during his second gubernatorial campaign. The party's platform is "to break down the ideological barriers that have kept common sense out of our government". Healey won 9% of the vote in 1994. In 1996, twenty CMP candidates ran for office; all were defeated.

In 1998, the Cool Moose Party successfully sued the state of Rhode Island to change its restrictive laws regarding primary elections. Cool Moose Party v. State of Rhode Island has been referenced in other states' court decisions relating to third-party candidates.

Healey ran for lieutenant governor in 2002, 2006, and 2010. In the 2010 lieutenant gubernatorial election, he ran on a platform of abolishing the office, as it has no constitutionally-mandated duties outside of waiting for the governor to become incapacitated. Running against incumbent Lieutenant Governor Elizabeth Roberts in that election, Healey won 39% of the vote after Republican Heidi Rogers dropped out so as not to split the "abolish the office" vote.

== 2014 gubernatorial campaign ==
In September 2014, Healey announced he was running for governor as a Moderate Party candidate for that year's election. His announcement came after the original Moderate nominee, James Spooner, withdrew from the race for health reasons. Healey stated he would not accept any funding, instead opting for a "guerilla campaign" for a "cerebral revolution". Shortly after he filed his candidacy, the Rhode Island GOP challenged the legality of the move on procedural grounds. The state board of elections found that Healey was in fact eligible to replace Spooner on the ballot. Healey spent a total of only $35.31 on his entire gubernatorial campaign, which he said went to purchase a prepaid mobile phone and a phone card, items he purchased himself. Healey's only advertisement during the campaign was a minimalist billboard featuring a caricature of his face, which he painted himself on the side of his friend's house overlooking Interstate 95 in Providence.

Healey came in third, with 21.4% of the election votes. He placed second in his native Bristol County, won two of that county's three municipalities, and came in second in several other municipalities statewide.

== Other activities ==
Healey invested in several business ventures. A liquor wholesaling company that he founded with a partner was very successful and Healey sold out his stake and invested in land in South America. He also exported California wines to Uruguay, imported tableware from Uruguay, started an ice cream business, a wine and cheese outlet, and a yachting service. He wrote a children's book, The King Needs Sleep.

Healey served as secretary of the Bristol County Bar Association from the mid-1980s to the mid-2010s.

== Death ==
Healey was found dead in his bed at his home in Barrington, Rhode Island before midnight on March 20, 2016. He is believed to have died from a heart attack in his sleep. He was 58 years old. He was buried on March 29 next to his parents at St. Alexander's Cemetery in Warren, Rhode Island.

Upon Healey's death, Rhode Island governor—and his 2014 gubernatorial opponent—Gina Raimondo issued a statement to the Providence Journal that she would "miss his passion and willingness to engage in spirited debate."

== Electoral history ==
Robert J. Healey electoral results, 1986–2014
Race	Party	Votes	%	Democratic	Votes	%	Republican	Votes	%	Third Party	Party	Votes	%	Third Party	Party	Votes	%
1986 gubernatorial	Cool Moose	5,694	1.8%	Bruce G. Sundlun	104,504	32.4%	Edward D. DiPrete (inc.)	208,822	64.7%	Anthony D. Affigne	Citizens	3,481	1.1%				
1994 gubernatorial	Cool Moose	32,822	9.1%	Myrth York	157,361	43.5%	Lincoln Almond	171,194	47.4%								
1998 gubernatorial	Cool Moose	19,250	6.3%	Myrth York	129,105	42.1%	Lincoln Almond (inc.)	156,180	51.0%	Joseph F. Devine	Reform	1,848	0.6%				
2002 lieutenant gubernatorial	Cool Moose	61,244	18.8%	Charles J. Fogarty (inc.)	175,218	53.8%	John Pagliarini Jr.	80,813	24.8%	Gregg R. Stevens	Green	8,705	2.7%				
2006 lieutenant gubernatorial	Cool Moose	51,220	13.4%	Elizabeth H. Roberts	202,659	53.1%	Reginald Centracchio	128,011	33.5%								
2010 lieutenant gubernatorial	Cool Moose	126,063	39.1%	Elizabeth H. Roberts (inc.)	175,640	54.5%				Independent	Robert Venturini	20,296	6.3%				
2014 gubernatorial	Moderate	69,070	21.4%	Gina Raimondo	131,452	40.7%	Allan Fung	117,106	36.2%	Independent	Kate Fletcher	3,474	1.1%	Independent	Leon Kayarian	1,221	0.4%

Party political offices
Preceded by Ken Block	Moderate nominee for Governor of Rhode Island; 2014	Succeeded by Bill Gilbert
