= 2010 Rhode Island lieutenant gubernatorial election =

- November 2, 2010
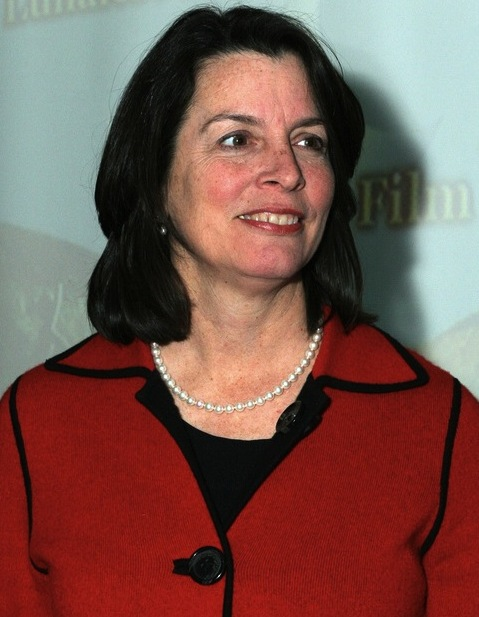

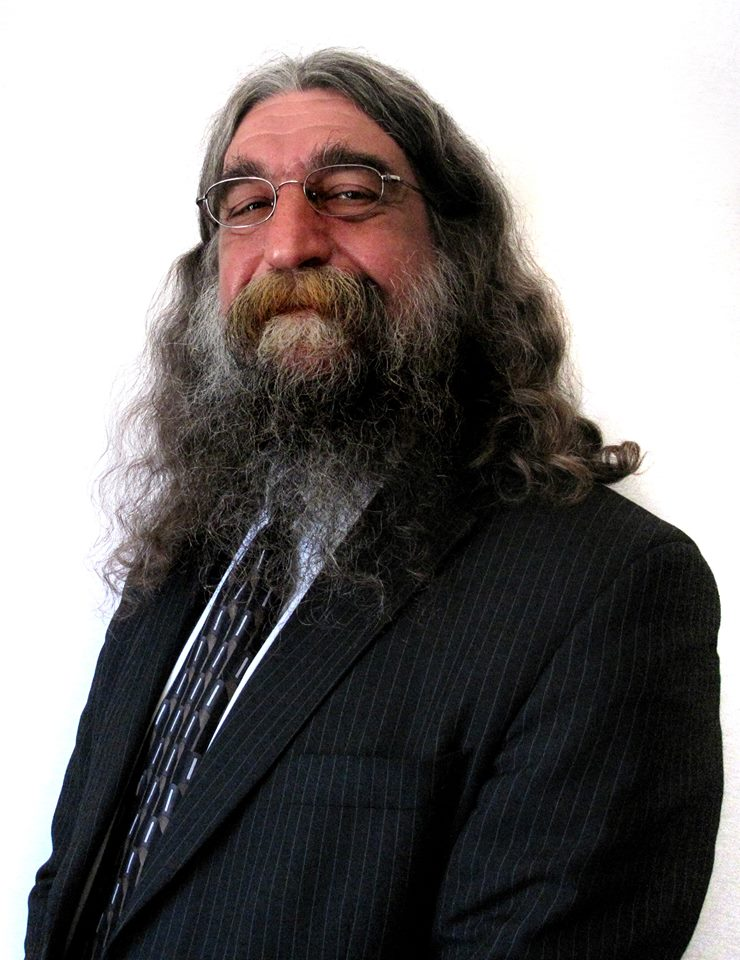

Candidate	Elizabeth H. Roberts	Robert J. Healey	Robert Venturini
Party	Democratic	Cool Moose Party	Independent
Popular vote	175,640	126,063	20,295
Percentage	54.5%	39.2%	6.3%
Lieutenant governor before election
Elizabeth H. Roberts
Democratic
Elected Lieutenant governor
Elizabeth H. Roberts
Democratic

An election was held on November 2, 2010, to elect the lieutenant governor of Rhode Island. Incumbent Democratic Party lieutenant governor Elizabeth H. Roberts was re-elected.

Primary elections occurred on September 14, 2010, however, the Republican nominee withdrew before the general election, leaving the Cool Moose Party nominee Robert J. Healey as the primary challenger to Roberts. Healey campaigned on abolition of the office of lieutenant governor, saying he would not hire any staff nor take a salary if elected.

== Democratic primary ==
=== Candidates ===
==== Nominee ====
- Elizabeth H. Roberts, incumbent lieutenant governor

==== Eliminated in primary ====
- Jeremy A. Kapstein

=== Results ===
Democratic primary results
Party	Candidate	Votes	%
Democratic	Elizabeth H. Roberts	61,145	64.2
Democratic	Jeremy A. Kapstein	34,031	35.8

== Republican primary ==
=== Candidates ===
==== Nominee ====
- Heidi Rogers (withdrew)

==== Eliminated in primary ====
- Kara D. Russo

=== Results ===
Republican primary results
Party	Candidate	Votes	%
Republican	Heidi Rogers	11,579	67.2
Republican	Kara D. Russo	5,645	32.8

== Third parties and independents ==
=== Candidates ===
==== Declared ====
- Robert J. Healey (Cool Moose Party)
- Robert Venturini (Independent)

== General election ==
=== Results ===
2010 Rhode Island lieutenant gubernatorial election
Party	Candidate	Votes	%
Democratic	Elizabeth H. Roberts	175,640	54.5
Cool Moose Party	Robert J. Healey	126,063	39.2
Independent	Robert Venturini	20,295	6.3
