= 1998 Rhode Island gubernatorial election =

- November 3, 1998
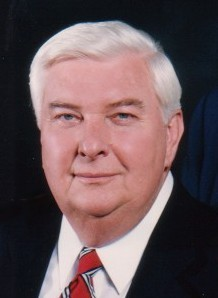

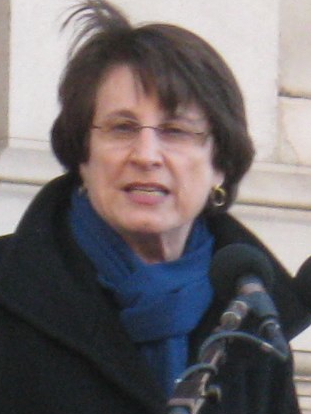

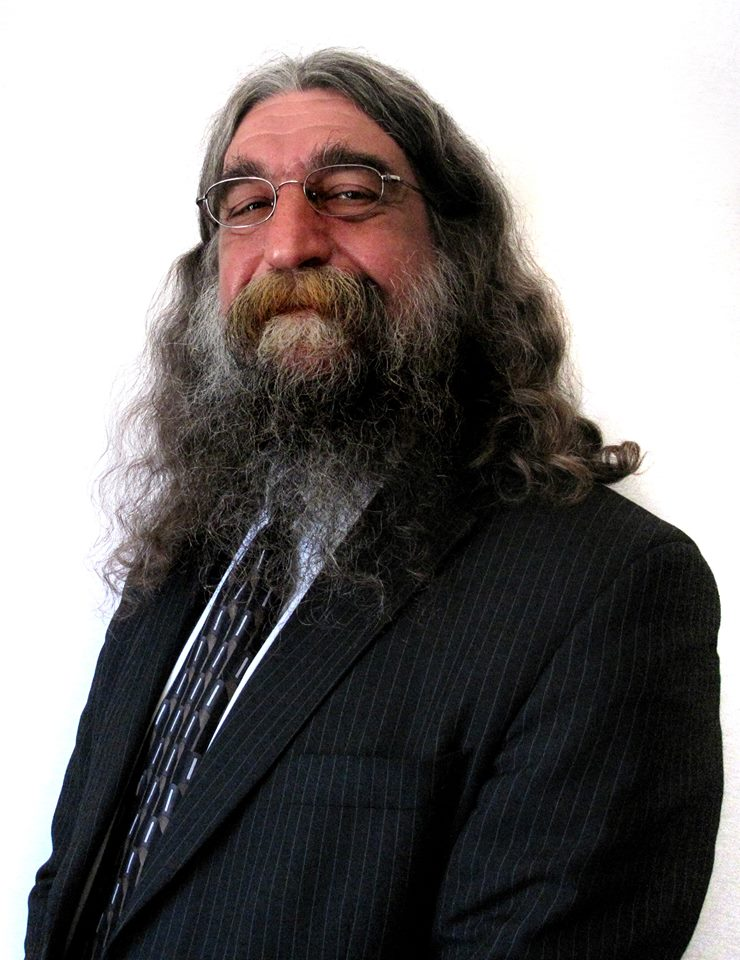
Nominee	Lincoln Almond	Myrth York	Robert J. Healey
Party	Republican	Democratic	Cool Moose
Popular vote	156,180	129,105	19,250
Percentage	50.97%	42.13%	6.28%
- Almond: 40–50% 50–60% 60–70% York: 40–50% 50–60%
Governor before election
Lincoln Almond
Republican
Elected Governor
Lincoln Almond
Republican

The 1998 Rhode Island gubernatorial election took place on November 3, 1998 to elect the governor of Rhode Island. Republican incumbent Lincoln Almond was re-elected to a second term in office over Democratic nominee Myrth York in a rematch of the 1994 race.

== Republican primary ==
=== Candidates ===
- Lincoln Almond, incumbent governor since 1995

=== Results ===
Republican primary results
Party	Candidate	Votes	%
Republican	Lincoln Almond (incumbent)	5,510	100.00
Total votes		5,510	100.00

== Democratic primary ==
=== Candidates ===
- Myrth York, former Rhode Island state senator and 1994 nominee for governor
- Jack Dennison Potter, perennial candidate

=== Results ===
Democratic primary results
Party	Candidate	Votes	%
Democratic	Myrth York	53,561	82.89
Democratic	Jack Dennison Potter	11,055	17.11
Total votes		64,616	100.00

== General election ==
=== Candidates ===
- Lincoln Almond, incumbent governor since 1995 (Republican)
- Joseph Devine, 1992 nominee for governor (Reform)
- Robert J. Healey, businessman and perennial candidate (Cool Moose)
- Myrth York, former Rhode Island state senator and 1994 nominee for governor (Democratic)

=== Polling ===
Poll source	Date(s) administered	Sample size (Note: Key: A – all adults RV – registered voters LV – likely voters V – unclear)	Margin of error	Lincoln Almond (R)	Myrth York (D)	Other / undecided (Note: Calculated by taking the difference of 100% and all other candidates combined.)
SurveyUSA	October 26, 1998	500	—	45%	44%	11%
Fleming & Associates (Note: Poll sponsored by WPRI Channel 12)	October 21–24, 1998	400 (RV)	± 5.0%	42%	38%	20%
KRC/Communications Research	October 21, 1998	400	—	40%	45%	15%
KRC/Communications Research	October 18, 1998	400	—	47%	45%	8%
Fleming & Associates	October 6–9, 1998	400 (LV)	± 5.0%	43%	38%	19%
KRC/Communications Research (Note: Poll sponsored by The Providence Journal & WJAR)	August 31 – September 2, 1998	400 (LV)	± 5.0%	42%	44%	14%

=== Results ===
Rhode Island gubernatorial election, 1998
Party	Candidate	Votes	%	±%
Republican	Lincoln Almond (incumbent)	156,180	50.97%	+3.59%
Democratic	Myrth York	129,105	42.13%	−1.41%
Cool Moose	Robert J. Healey	19,250	6.28%	−2.82%
Reform	Joseph F. Devine	1,848	0.60%	
Write-ins		62	0.02%	
Majority		27,075	8.84%	+5.01%
Turnout		306,445		
Republican hold		Swing		

==== By county ====
	Lincoln Almond Republican		Myrth York Democratic		All Others	
County	Votes	%	Votes	%	Votes	%
Bristol	8,587	52.2%	5,956	36.2%	1,822	11.7%
Kent	29,354	52.7%	22,202	39.9%	4,146	7.5%
Newport	14,130	54.3%	9,922	38.1%	1,977	7.6%
Providence	81,643	48.3%	76,932	45.5%	10,428	6.2%
Washington	22,466	57.3%	14,093	36.0%	2,625	6.7%

Counties that flipped from Democratic to Republican

- Newport

== Notes ==
Partisan clients
