= Ronald Machtley =

American politician

Ron Machtley
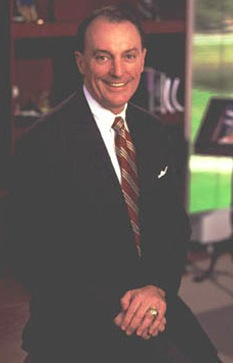

7th President of Bryant University
- In office 1996–2020
- Preceded by: William E. Trueheart
- Succeeded by: Ross Gittell

Member of the U.S. House of Representatives from Rhode Island's 1st district
- In office January 3, 1989 – January 3, 1995
- Preceded by: Fernand St. Germain
- Succeeded by: Patrick J. Kennedy

Personal details
- Born: Ronald Keith Machtley; July 13, 1948 (age 78) Johnstown, Pennsylvania, U.S.
- Party: Republican
- Spouse: Kati Machtley
- Education: United States Naval Academy (BS); Suffolk University (JD)

Military service
- Branch/service: United States Navy
- Years of service: 1970–1975 (active); 1975–1995 (reserve)
- Rank: Commander
- Unit: United States Naval Reserve

Ronald Keith Machtley (born July 13, 1948) is an American politician and former president of Bryant University. Machtley served three terms as a Republican member of the United States House of Representatives from Rhode Island from 1989 to 1995. From 1996 to 2020, Machtley served as president of Bryant University in Smithfield, Rhode Island, and was awarded faculty membership in Omicron Delta Kappa there in 2005.

== Biography ==
Machtley was born in Johnstown, Pennsylvania and attended public schools. He received a B.S. from the United States Naval Academy in 1970, serving in the United States Navy from 1970 to 1975 and the United States Naval Reserve from 1975 to 1995 becoming a commander. Machtley received a Juris Doctor from Suffolk University Law School in Boston, Massachusetts in 1978 and was admitted to the Rhode Island bar in the same year.

=== Congress ===
Machtley ran for Congress as a Republican in the 1st District and defeated 28-year incumbent Democrat Fernand St. Germain in a considerable upset. He was reelected two more times and was very popular even as Rhode Island was trending more and more Democratic. In 1992, for instance, he was reelected with a staggering 70 percent of the vote even as Bill Clinton easily carried the state. He was a moderate Republican in the mold of John Chafee.

=== Campaign for governor ===
Machtley gave up his seat to run for Governor of Rhode Island in 1994. He was the heavy favorite in the Republican primary, but was soundly defeated by Lincoln Almond, who went on to victory in November. As of 2023, he is the last Republican elected to the House from Rhode Island and one of only four Republicans to represent Rhode Island in Congress since 1941 (the others being senators John Chafee and Lincoln Chafee and representative Claudine Schneider).

=== University president ===
Machtley was named president of Bryant in 1996 and shepherded it through its transition to university status in 2004. His salary as of 2017 was reported as $719,243, not including an additional $120,726 reported under other compensation from the organization and related organizations. During his tenure, he led several major building campaigns.

In February 2019 Ron and Katie Machtley made a gift of $1 million to push the Expanding the World of Opportunity campaign over the $100 million mark. Shortly thereafter, the Providence Business News reported that Machtley was paid $6.2M in 2017 as part of a retention package. It is believed this is one of the largest such payouts in the history of American higher education.

=== Retirement ===
In May 2019 Machtley announced that he would be retiring as President of Bryant University in May 2020.

Machtley, an avid golfer, is a member of Newport Country Club, and is a Rhode Island Commodore.

U.S. House of Representatives
Preceded by Fernand St. Germain	Member of the U.S. House of Representatives from Rhode Island's 1st congressional district 1989–1995	Succeeded by Patrick J. Kennedy
U.S. order of precedence (ceremonial)
Preceded by Mark Walker as Former U.S. Representative	Order of precedence of the United States as Former U.S. Representative	Succeeded by Scotty Baesler as Former U.S. Representative
