= Bernard Jackvony =

American politician

66th Lieutenant Governor of Rhode Island
- In office January 2, 1997 – January 2, 1999
- Governor: Lincoln Almond
- Preceded by: Robert Weygand
- Succeeded by: Charles Fogarty

Personal details
- Born: April 9, 1945 (age 81) Providence, Rhode Island, U.S.
- Party: Republican
- Education: Bryant University, Boston University, Suffolk University
- Occupation: Lawyer

Bernard A. Jackvony (born April 9, 1945) is a former lieutenant governor of Rhode Island and a lawyer who specialises in fiduciary litigation.

Born in Providence, Rhode Island, he holds a bachelor's degree from Bryant University, a master's degree from Boston University a and a J.D. degree from Suffolk University.

Jackvony served in the United States Marine Corps from 1970 to 1973 and was promoted to the rank of captain. He served as a judge advocate with the 3rd Marine Division in Okinawa in 1972, the year the island reverted to Japan from the United States. He was appointed an official court observer for U. S. Marines charged by the Japanese and tried in Japanese courts. He is a past commander of the Rhode Island Commandery of the Military Order of Foreign Wars.

In January 1997 he was appointed Lieutenant Governor of Rhode Island by Governor Lincoln Almond when Lieutenant Governor Robert Weygand was elected United States Representative for the 2nd District of Rhode Island. He was only the second Republican to hold the office in the previous 56 years. He held the office until January 1999.

He served for a time as Rhode Island Republican Party chairman, starting in 2000. He oversaw the largely unsuccessful attempt in 2000 to increase the number of Republicans in the Rhode Island legislature. Jackvony made an unsuccessful run for governor of Rhode Island in 2002.

Jackvony pursued a legal career concentrating in estate litigation.

== Sources ==
- law profile of Jackvony
