= James Sheehan (Rhode Island politician) =

American politician (born 1966)

Member of the Rhode Island Senate from the 36th district
- In office January 2003 – January 5, 2021
- Preceded by: John Celona
- Succeeded by: Alana Dimario

Member of the Rhode Island Senate from the 23rd district
- In office January 2001 – January 2003
- Preceded by: John Patterson
- Succeeded by: Paul Fogarty

Personal details
- Born: January 27, 1966 (age 60) Warwick, Rhode Island
- Party: Democratic
- Education: Rhode Island College; University of Rhode Island; Catholic University
- Website: senatorsheehan.com

James C. Sheehan (born January 27, 1966, in Warwick, Rhode Island) is an American politician and a Democratic member of the Rhode Island Senate representing District 36 since January 2003. Sheehan served consecutively from January 2001 until January 2003 in the District 23 seat. On November 6, 2018, Sheehan won election to a tenth consecutive term in the Rhode Island Senate, defeating Republican challenger John P. Silvaggio by a margin of 66.9 percent to 32.7 percent.

== Education ==
Sheehan received his teaching certification from Rhode Island College, earned his BA from the University of Rhode Island, and his MA from Catholic University.

== Elections ==
- 2012 Sheehan was unopposed for the September 11, 2012, Democratic Primary, winning with 959 votes, and won the November 6, 2012, General election with 8,595 votes (60.0%) against Republican nominee Mariacristina McKendall.
- 2000 To challenge District 23 incumbent Republican Senator John Patterson, Sheehan was unopposed for the September 12, 2000, Democratic Primary, winning with 1,103 votes, and won the November 7, 2000, General election with 5,431 votes (56.2%) against Senator Patterson.
- 2002 Redistricted to District 36, and with incumbent Democratic Senator John Celona redistricted to District 7, Sheehan won the September 10, 2002, Democratic Primary with 2,485 votes (65.9%) against fellow Senator Patrick McDonald (who had been redistricted from District 24); Sheehan won the November 5, 2002, General election with 6,002 votes (52.1%) against Republican nominee Timothy Haxton.
- 2004 Sheehan was unopposed for the September 14, 2004, Democratic Primary, winning with 1,056 votes, and won the November 2, 2004, General election with 8,572 votes (62.2%) against Republican nominee Robin Porter.
- 2006 Sheehan was unopposed for the September 12, 2006, Democratic Primary, winning with 1,497 votes, and won the November 7, 2006, General election with 8,480 votes (67.1%) against Republican nominee William Connelly, who had run in the Republican Primary in 2004.
- 2008 Sheehan was again challenged in the September 9, 2008, Democratic Primary, and won with 1,997 votes (62.8%); returning 2006 Republican challenger William Connelly was unopposed in his primary, setting up a rematch; Sheehan won the November 4, 2008, General election with 8,632 votes (62.8%) against Connelly.
- 2010 Sheehan was unopposed for the September 23, 2010, Democratic Primary, winning with 2,114 votes; returning Republican challenger William Connelly won his primary, setting up their third contest; Sheehan won the November 2, 2010, General election with 6,462 votes (58.1%) against Connelly.
