= William E. Trueheart =

American academic administrator

President of Bryant University
- In office August 1, 1989 – 1996
- Preceded by: William T. O'Hara
- Succeeded by: Ronald K. Machtley

Personal details
- Born: July 10, 1942 (age 84) Stamford, Connecticut, US
- Education: Harvard University (MPA, EdD); University of Connecticut (BA)
- Occupation: Academic administrator, nonprofit CEO

William E. Trueheart (born July 10, 1942) is an American academic administrator and nonprofit CEO who served as president of Bryant University from 1989 to 1996. He was the first African American to lead a 4-year private college in New England. Following his departure from Bryant, Trueheart served as president and CEO of three nonprofit organizations: Reading Is Fundamental (1997–2001), The Pittsburgh Foundation (2001–2007), and Achieving the Dream (2007–2015).

Trueheart holds a Bachelor of Arts degree in political science and economics from the University of Connecticut, a Master of Public Administration from the Harvard Kennedy School, and a Doctor of Education degree from the Harvard Graduate School of Education. His honorary degrees include a PhD in Humane Letters from Bryant University, a PhD in education from Bridgewater State University, and a Doctor of Business Administration from Johnson & Wales University.
