= Otto H. York =

American chemical engineer and philanthropist

- Born: 1910; Chicago, Illinois, U.S.
- Died: July 12, 2007 (aged 96); Maplewood, New Jersey, U.S.
- Education: Purdue University (BS)
- Children: Myrth York

Otto H. York (1910 – July 12, 2007) was an American chemical engineer, entrepreneur, and philanthropist.

== Early life and education ==
York was born in Chicago in 1910 and spent much of his life in Maplewood, New Jersey. He earned a Bachelor of Science degree in chemical engineering from Purdue University in 1934.

== Career ==
York began his chemical engineering career working for a number of research laboratories of large companies, inventing several technical refinements that improved the safety and efficiency of fighter planes.

In 1947, York founded a company called Otto H. York Industries. The company developed and marketed the Demister, a device made of knitted wire mesh pads used in the chemical and petroleum industries to improve the performance of process vessels. He built his business into a major New Jersey corporation, which was a leader in chemical recovery. He later sold the company to Foster Wheeler.

York started the Otto H. York Foundation Inc., and supported many groups working to improve healthcare, education and environmental research. A friend and donor to New Jersey Institute of Technology (NJIT) for more than three decades, he enabled substantial improvements to university facilities. In 1989, NJIT dedicated the Otto H. York Center for Environmental Engineering and Science in his honor, and in 1997 he received an honorary Doctor of Science degree from NJIT.

In 2002, York pledged $1 million to the chemical engineering department. The endowment fund to establish scholarships to attract outstanding students to its chemical engineering department as well as to support research by faculty. That same year, the department was renamed the Otto H. York Department of Chemical Engineering.

== Personal life ==
York was the father of Rhode Island politician Myrth York. He died on July 12, 2007.
