= 2006 Rhode Island gubernatorial election =

- November 7, 2006
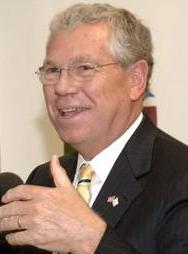

Nominee	Donald Carcieri	Charles Fogarty
Party	Republican	Democratic
Popular vote	197,306	189,503
Percentage	51.01%	48.99%
- Carcieri: 50–60% 60–70% 70–80% Fogarty: 50–60% 60–70% 70–80%
Governor before election
Donald Carcieri
Republican
Elected Governor
Donald Carcieri
Republican

The 2006 Rhode Island gubernatorial election took place on November 7, 2006. Incumbent Republican Donald Carcieri very narrowly defeated Democratic lieutenant governor Charles J. Fogarty in one of the closest gubernatorial elections in Rhode Island history. With a margin of 2%, this election was also the second-closest race of the 2006 gubernatorial election cycle, behind only the election in Minnesota.

As of 2026, this was the last time a Republican was elected Governor of Rhode Island and the last time a Republican won any statewide office in Rhode Island. This is also the last time the Republican candidate won the counties of Bristol and Washington. This is the last time that a gubernatorial nominee and a lieutenant gubernatorial nominee of different political parties were elected governor and lieutenant governor of Rhode Island.

== Republican primary ==
=== Candidates ===
- Donald Carcieri, incumbent governor of Rhode Island

=== Results ===
Republican Party primary results
Party	Candidate	Votes	%
Republican	Donald Carcieri (incumbent)	51,650	100.00
Total votes		51,650	100.00

== Democratic primary ==
=== Candidates ===
- Charles Fogarty, Lieutenant Governor of Rhode Island, former Rhode Island state senator

=== Results ===
Democratic Party primary results
Party	Candidate	Votes	%
Democratic	Charles J. Fogarty	69,595	100.00
Total votes		69,595	100.00

== General election ==
=== Predictions ===
Source	Ranking	As of
The Cook Political Report	Tossup	November 6, 2006
Sabato's Crystal Ball	Lean R	November 6, 2006
Rothenberg Political Report	Lean R	November 2, 2006
Real Clear Politics	Likely R	November 6, 2006

=== Polling ===
Source	Date	Donald Carcieri (R)	Charles J. Fogarty (D)
Rasmussen	October 24, 2006	51%	44%
Rasmussen	October 8, 2006	47%	44%
Rasmussen	September 5, 2006	41%	46%
Rasmussen	August 9, 2006	43%	43%
Rasmussen	July 18, 2006	42%	43%
Brown University	June 26, 2006	44%	39%
Rhode Island College	June 21, 2006	44%	39%
Rasmussen	June 12, 2006	40%	41%
Rasmussen	May 4, 2006	41%	42%
Brown University	February 8, 2006	46%	35%
Brown University	September 13, 2005	42%	31%

=== Results ===
The 2006 gubernatorial election was one of the closest in the history of Rhode Island. Carcieri won all but one county. However, the one county that went for Fogarty was Providence County, home to Providence, Rhode Island, which is heavily populated and known for favoring Democrats. The race at one point was only at a margin of 7,803 votes. Finally, at 3:48 A.M. on November 8, Carcieri was declared the winner by the Associated Press. Fogarty conceded early the next morning.

Rhode Island gubernatorial election, 2006
Party	Candidate	Votes	%	±%
Republican	Donald Carcieri (incumbent)	197,306	51.01%	−3.75%
Democratic	Charles J. Fogarty	189,503	48.99%	+3.75%
Majority		7,803	2.02%	−7.50%
Turnout		386,809		
Republican hold		Swing		

==== By county ====
	Donald Carcieri Republican		Charles Fogarty Democratic		Others	
County	Votes	%	Votes	%	Votes	%
Bristol	12,236	58.0%	8,857	41.9%	21	0.1%
Kent	40,503	55.4%	32,515	44.5%	93	0.1%
Newport	20,305	59.9%	13,554	40.0%	32	0.1%
Providence	91,623	45.0%	111,601	54.8%	258	0.1%
Washington	32,699	58.6%	23,035	41.3%	70	0.1%

Counties that flipped from Republican to Democratic

- Providence (largest municipality: Providence)
