= 1908 United States presidential election in Rhode Island =

- November 3, 1908

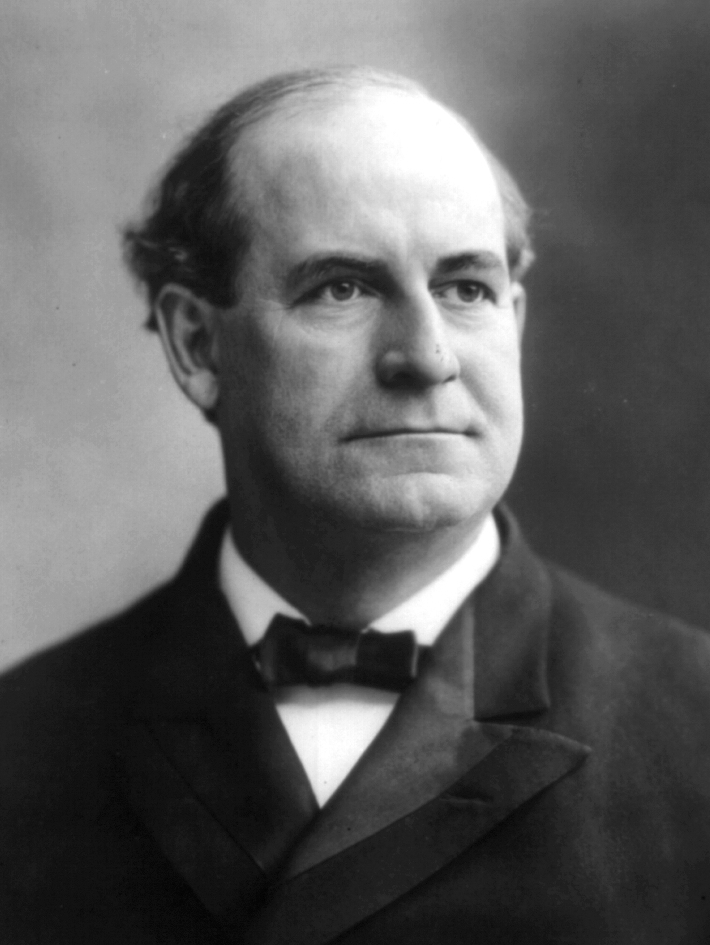
Nominee	William Howard Taft	William Jennings Bryan
Party	Republican	Democratic
Home state	Ohio	Nebraska
Running mate	James S. Sherman	John W. Kern
Electoral vote	4	0
Popular vote	43,942	24,706
Percentage	60.76%	34.16%

Taft
50–60%
60–70%
70–80%
80–90%
90–100%
Bryan
40–50%
50–60%
President before election
Theodore Roosevelt
Republican
Elected President
William Howard Taft
Republican

The 1908 United States presidential election in Rhode Island took place on November 3, 1908, as part of the 1908 United States presidential election. Voters chose four representatives, or electors to the Electoral College, who voted for president and vice president.

Rhode Island voted for the Republican nominees, Secretary of War William Howard Taft of Ohio and his running mate James S. Sherman of New York. They defeated the Democratic nominees, former U.S. Representative William Jennings Bryan of Nebraska and his running mate John W. Kern of Indiana. Taft won the state by a margin of 26.6%.

With 60.76% of the popular vote, Rhode Island would be Taft's fifth strongest victory in terms of percentage in the popular vote after Vermont, Maine, Michigan and North Dakota.

Bryan had previously lost Rhode Island to William McKinley in both 1896 and 1900.

== Results ==
1908 United States presidential election in Rhode Island
Party	Candidate	Running mate	Popular vote		Electoral vote	
Party	Candidate	Running mate	Count	%	Count	%
Republican	William Howard Taft of Ohio	James Schoolcraft Sherman of New York	43,942	60.76%	4	100.00%
Democratic	William Jennings Bryan of Nebraska	John Worth Kern of Indiana	24,706	34.16%	0	0.00%
Socialist	Eugene Victor Debs of Indiana	Benjamin Hanford of New York	1,365	1.89%	0	0.00%
Independence	Thomas Louis Hisgen of Massachusetts	John Temple Graves of Georgia	1,105	1.53%	0	0.00%
Prohibition	Eugene Wilder Chafin of Illinois	Aaron Sherman Watkins of Ohio	1,016	1.40%	0	0.00%
Socialist Labor	August Gillhaus of New York	Donald L. Munro of Virginia	183	0.25%	0	0.00%
Total			72,317	100.00%	4	100.00%

== See also ==
- United States presidential elections in Rhode Island
