= 1896 United States presidential election in Rhode Island =

- November 3, 1896
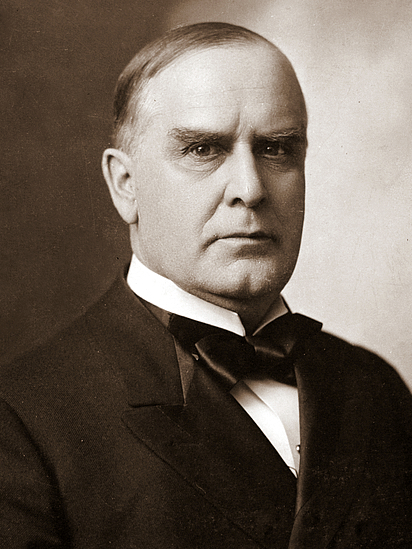

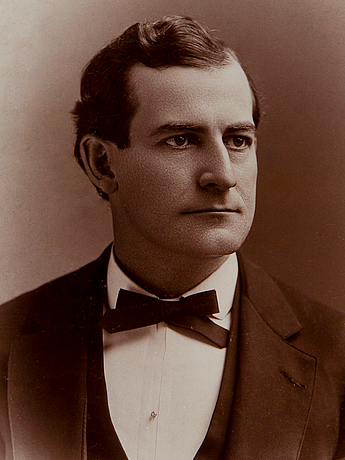
| Nominee | William McKinley | William Jennings Bryan |
| Party | Republican | Democratic |
| Home state | Ohio | Nebraska |
| Running mate | Garret Hobart | Arthur Sewall |
| Electoral vote | 4 | 0 |
| Popular vote | 37,437 | 14,459 |
| Percentage | 68.33% | 26.39% |

McKinley
50–60%
60–70%
70–80%
80–90%
90–100%
President before election
Grover Cleveland
Democratic
Elected President
William McKinley
Republican

The 1896 United States presidential election in Rhode Island took place on November 3, 1896, as part of the 1896 United States presidential election. Voters chose four representatives, or electors to the Electoral College, who voted for president and vice president.

Rhode Island voted for the Republican nominee, former governor of Ohio William McKinley, over the Democratic nominee, former U.S. Representative from Nebraska William Jennings Bryan. McKinley won the state by a wide margin of 41.94%.

Bryan, running on a platform of free silver, appealed strongly to Western miners and farmers in the 1896 election, but had little appeal in Northeastern states like Rhode Island.

With 68.33% of the popular vote, Rhode Island would be McKinley's fourth strongest victory in terms of percentage in the popular vote after Vermont, neighboring Massachusetts and New Hampshire.

Bryan would lose Rhode Island to McKinley again four years later and would later lose the state again in 1908 to William Howard Taft.

== Results ==
1896 United States presidential election in Rhode Island
| Party | Candidate | Running mate | Popular vote | | Electoral vote | |
| Party | Candidate | Running mate | Count | % | Count | % |
|---|---|---|---|---|---|---|
| Republican | William McKinley of Ohio | Garret Hobart of New Jersey | 37,437 | 68.33% | 4 | 100.00% |
| Democratic | William Jennings Bryan of Nebraska | Arthur Sewall of Maine | 14,459 | 26.39% | 0 | 0.00% |
| National Democratic | John McAuley Palmer of Illinois | Simon Bolivar Buckner of Kentucky | 1,166 | 2.13% | 0 | 0.00% |
| Prohibition | Joshua Levering of Maryland | Hale Johnson of Illinois | 1,160 | 2.12% | 0 | 0.00% |
| Socialist Labor | Charles Horatio Matchett of New York | Matthew Maguire of New Jersey | 558 | 1.02% | 0 | 0.00% |
| N/A | Others | Others | 5 | 0.01% | 0 | 0.00% |
| Total | | | 54,785 | 100.00% | 4 | 100.00% |

== See also ==
- United States presidential elections in Rhode Island
