= Donald Carcieri =

American politician and corporate executive

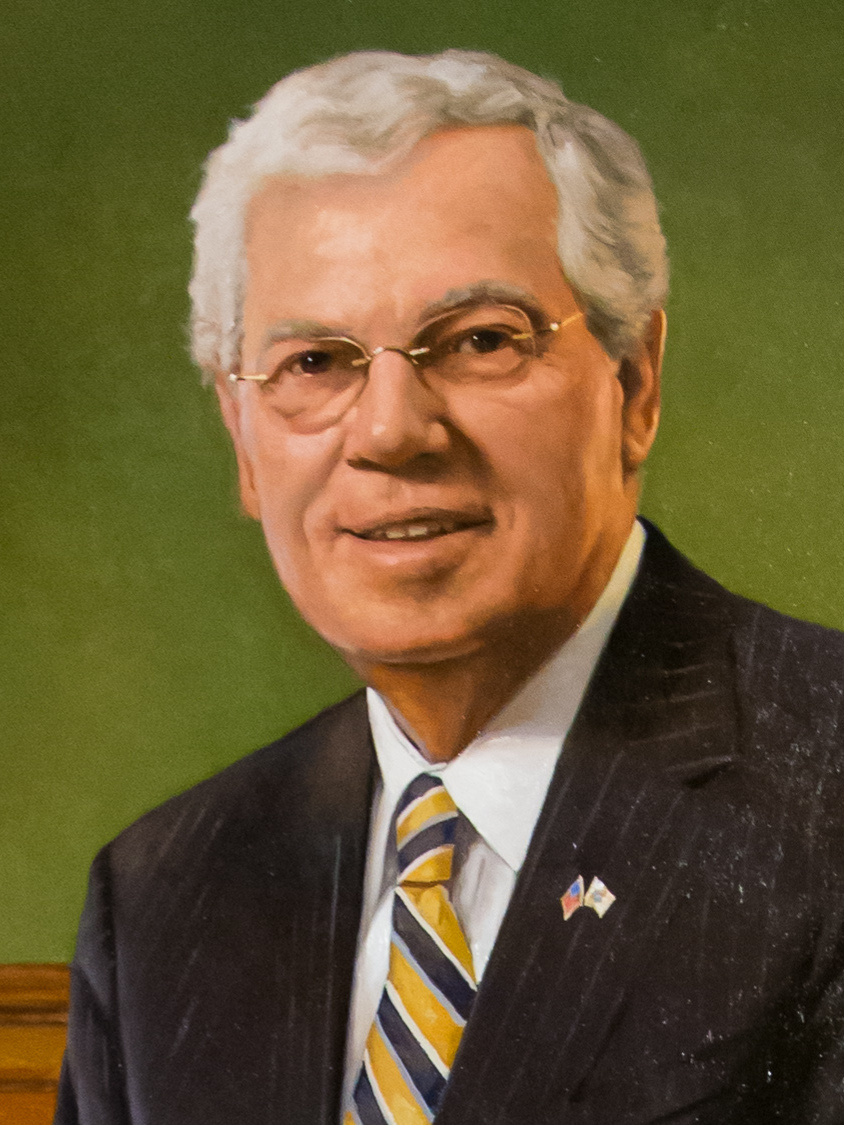

73rd Governor of Rhode Island
- In office January 7, 2003 – January 4, 2011
- Lieutenant: Charles Fogarty; Elizabeth Roberts
- Preceded by: Lincoln Almond
- Succeeded by: Lincoln Chafee

Personal details
- Born: Donald Louis Carcieri; December 16, 1942 (age 83) East Greenwich, Rhode Island, U.S.
- Party: Republican
- Spouse: Suzanne Owren (m. 1965; died 2018)
- Education: Brown University (BA)

Donald Louis Carcieri (/kərˈtʃɪri/ kər-CHEER-ee; Italian: [karˈtʃɛːri]; born December 16, 1942) is an American politician and corporate executive who served as the 73rd governor of Rhode Island from January 2003 to January 2011. Carcieri has worked as a manufacturing company executive, aid relief worker, bank executive, and teacher. He is the most recent member of the Republican Party to have served as Governor of Rhode Island.

== Personal background ==
Carcieri was born and raised in East Greenwich, Rhode Island, the son of Marguerite E. (née Anderson) and Nicola J. Carcieri, a football and basketball coach at East Greenwich High School. His father was of Italian American descent and his mother was of Swedish American descent. Carcieri played baseball, basketball, and football while in high school and received a college scholarship. He graduated from Brown University with a degree in International Relations. Carcieri started his career as a high school math teacher, working in Newport, Rhode Island, and Concord, Massachusetts. He later became a banker and businessman, working his way up the ranks to become an executive vice president at Old Stone Bank.

In 1981, Carcieri and his family moved to Kingston, Jamaica, where he worked for Catholic Relief Services. Two years later, he returned to Rhode Island and became an executive at the Cookson Group. He eventually became Joint Managing Director for Cookson and CEO of the company's Cookson America subsidiary. At the request of Carcieri, Cookson established their U.S. headquarters in an unused building in downtown Providence. As of 2006 he had 4 children and 13 grandchildren.

== Governorship ==
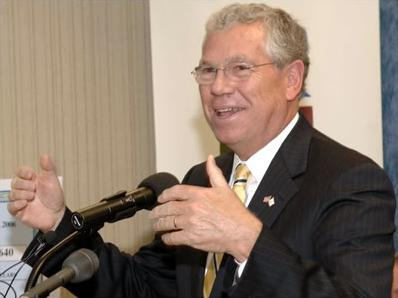
Donald Carcieri speaking in 2006

He ran for Governor of Rhode Island in 2002. In the Republican primary election, he defeated James Bennett, who had won the endorsement of the state Republican Party. He went on to defeat Democrat Myrth York, a former state senator, by 55% to 45% in the general election.

=== Station night club fire ===
On February 20, 2003, The Station nightclub in West Warwick, Rhode Island, was engulfed in a catastrophic fire which claimed 100 lives. The fire, which was one of the worst such tragedies in American history, was widely covered by the national press, which gave Carcieri's public statements on the event nationwide coverage. Eventually the Governor declared a moratorium on pyrotechnics for crowds under 300 people.

=== Conflicts with the legislature ===
In 2005, both houses of the Rhode Island General Assembly passed a bill legalizing medical marijuana. Carcieri vetoed the bill, but the legislature overrode Carcieri by a large margin. Carcieri and the Democratic-dominated General Assembly had been at odds on a number of issues: enacting separation of powers, the treatment of state workers, and whether children of illegal immigrants should have access to the state childcare health care plan. Carcieri often warned against increasing the size of the state's welfare programs as unaffordable and unsustainable and that the state suffers economically from a history of corruption. Carcieri has had a history of confrontations with the heavily Democratic state legislature, community activists, and organized labor.

=== Re-election ===
Carcieri narrowly won re-election in 2006. Rhode Island is one of 19 states that elects its governor and lieutenant governor separately rather than on a single party ticket; Carcieri faced his own Lieutenant Governor, Democrat Charles J. Fogarty, who was prevented, by term limits, from running again for the Lieutenant Governor position.

=== 2007 snowstorm ===
One of the most controversial events of Carcieri's governorship occurred on December 13, 2007, when the state of Rhode Island experienced a storm which dumped about 10–12 inches of snow on the state at the time of the evening commute. It became known as the "December Debacle." On that day, Carcieri was in the Middle East and could not be contacted until the storm was over. As a result of the timing of the storm and of conflicts between various state agencies about who was responsible for emergency management during Carcieri's absence, there was inadequate snow clearance on major highways, causing gridlock long into the night and stranding several buses of schoolchildren in snowbanks for a number of hours. Widely criticized for blocking the Lieutenant Governor from taking charge in his absence, Carcieri admitted that his administration did "a poor job of communications" during the storm. However, he refused to answer questions concerning who would be in charge of the state in the event of his absence. Eventually a judge required Carcieri to release documents indicating his orders on the chain of command in such situations.

=== Immigration ===
On March 27, 2008, Carcieri signed an Executive Order requiring state agencies and vendors to verify the legal status of all employees and directing the Rhode Island State Police and the Department of Corrections to work with U.S. Immigration and Customs Enforcement to ensure federal immigration laws are enforced.

=== Stance on LGBT issues ===
Carcieri is a member of the National Organization for Marriage which advocates for marriage to be legally defined as a union of one man and one woman.

In November 2009, Carcieri vetoed H 5294 which, if enacted, would allow domestic partners to oversee and care for a same-sex partner's funeral arrangements. The bill's impetus was motivated by an event when the State refused to release the body of a man to his 17-year same-sex partner. In his veto message, Carcieri made the following statement: "This bill represents a disturbing trend over the past few years of the incremental erosion of the principles surrounding traditional marriage, which is not the preferred way to approach this issue."

In January 2010, the Legislature voted to override the veto.

=== 2009 furlough controversy ===
In the fiscal year 2010, the state of Rhode Island was facing a budget shortfall of $528 million. In an effort to shed $67.8 million, Carcieri imposed 12 furlough days. The first unpaid day was to occur on Friday, September 5, 2009. The unions representing state workers were able to, in the 11th hour, have a restraining order issued by Rhode Island Supreme Court Justice Maureen McKenna Goldberg with a full court hearing on the matter to occur on September 12. Almost immediately Carcieri issued a press release noting he now has no other option but layoffs. He further went on to say "It should greatly disturb every state employee and every Rhode Islander that labor leaders are willing to sacrifice people’s jobs so they can maintain their stranglehold on the citizens of this state."

=== Retirement from politics ===
Carcieri was term limited and was unable to seek a third term in 2010.

== Electoral history ==
Rhode Island Gubernatorial Election 2002
Party	Candidate	Votes	%	±%
Republican	Donald Carcieri	173,545	54.8	
Democratic	Myrth York	143,750	45.2	

Rhode Island Gubernatorial Election 2006
Party	Candidate	Votes	%	±%
Republican	Donald Carcieri (Incumbent)	197,013	50.9	−3.9
Democratic	Charles J. Fogarty	189,099	48.9	

== See also ==
- 2006 Rhode Island gubernatorial election

Party political offices
Preceded by Lincoln Almond	Republican nominee for Governor of Rhode Island; 2002, 2006	Succeeded by John Robitaille (2010)
Political offices
Preceded by Lincoln Almond	Governor of Rhode Island; 2003–2011	Succeeded by Lincoln Chafee
U.S. order of precedence (ceremonial)
Preceded by Philip W. Noel as Former Governor	Order of precedence of the United States; Within Rhode Island	Succeeded by Jack Markell as Former Governor
Preceded by Philip W. Noel as Former Governor	Order of precedence of the United States; Outside Rhode Island	Succeeded by Madeleine M. Kunin as Former Governor
