= Paul Fogarty =

American politician

Member of the Rhode Island Senate from the 23rd district
- In office January 2003 – January 1, 2019
- Preceded by: James Sheehan
- Succeeded by: Jessica de la Cruz

Member of the Rhode Island Senate
- In office January 1999 – January 2003
- Preceded by: Charles J. Fogarty
- Succeeded by: Hanna Gallo

Personal details
- Born: January 8, 1957 (age 69) Providence, Rhode Island, U.S.
- Party: Democratic
- Relations: Charles J. Fogarty, brother John E. Fogarty, uncle
- Parent: Charles Fogarty, Sr.

Paul W. Fogarty (born January 8, 1957, in Providence, Rhode Island) is an American politician and a former Democratic member of the Rhode Island Senate who represented District 23 from January 2003 to January 1, 2019. Fogarty served consecutively from January 1999 until January 2003 in the District 27 seat. He is the son of former Rhode Island state Senator Charles Fogarty, Sr., the younger brother of Rhode Island Lieutenant governor Charles J. Fogarty, and the nephew of United States Representative John E. Fogarty.

== Education ==
Fogarty graduated from the La Salle Academy.

== Elections ==
- 2012 Fogarty and returning 2010 Republican challenger Julian Forgue were both unopposed for their September 11, 2012, primaries, setting up a rematch; Fogarty won the November 6, 2012, general election with 7,513 votes (59.0%) against Forgue.
- 1998 When District 27 Democratic Senator Charles J. Fogarty ran for Lieutenant Governor of Rhode Island and left the seat open, Fogarty was unopposed for the September 15, 1998, Democratic Primary, winning with 445 votes, and won the three-way November 3, 1998, general election with 2,958 votes (53.9%) against Republican nominee M. Jeffry Schanck and Independent candidate Mary Ryan.
- 2000 Fogarty was unopposed for the September 12, 2000, Democratic Primary, winning with 601 votes, and won the November 7, 2000, general election with 5,488 votes (73.3%) against Republican nominee Jeffrey Bowie.
- 2002 Redistricted to District 23, and with incumbent Democratic Senator James Sheehan redistricted to District 36, Fogarty was unopposed for the September 10, 2002, Democratic Primary, winning with 1,403 votes, and won the November 5, 2002, general election with 6,110 votes (67.9%) against Republican nominee Elizabeth Tetraeault.
- 2004 Fogarty was unopposed for the September 14, 2004, Democratic Primary, winning with 667 votes, and won the November 2, 2004, general election with 8,146 votes (68.6%) against Republican nominee Cynthia Roe.
- 2006 Fogarty was unopposed for both the September 12, 2006, Democratic Primary, winning with 1,107 votes, and the November 7, 2006, general election, winning with 8,935 votes.
- 2008 Fogarty was unopposed for the September 9, 2008, Democratic Primary, winning with 1,028 votes, and the November 4, 2008, general election, winning with 7,735 votes (58.7%) against Republican former state Representative Scott Rabideau.
- 2010 Fogarty was unopposed for the September 23, 2010, Democratic Primary, winning with 1,764 votes, and won the November 2, 2010, general election with 5,507 votes (51.5%) against Republican nominee Julian Forgue.
