= 1900 United States presidential election in Rhode Island =

- November 6, 1900
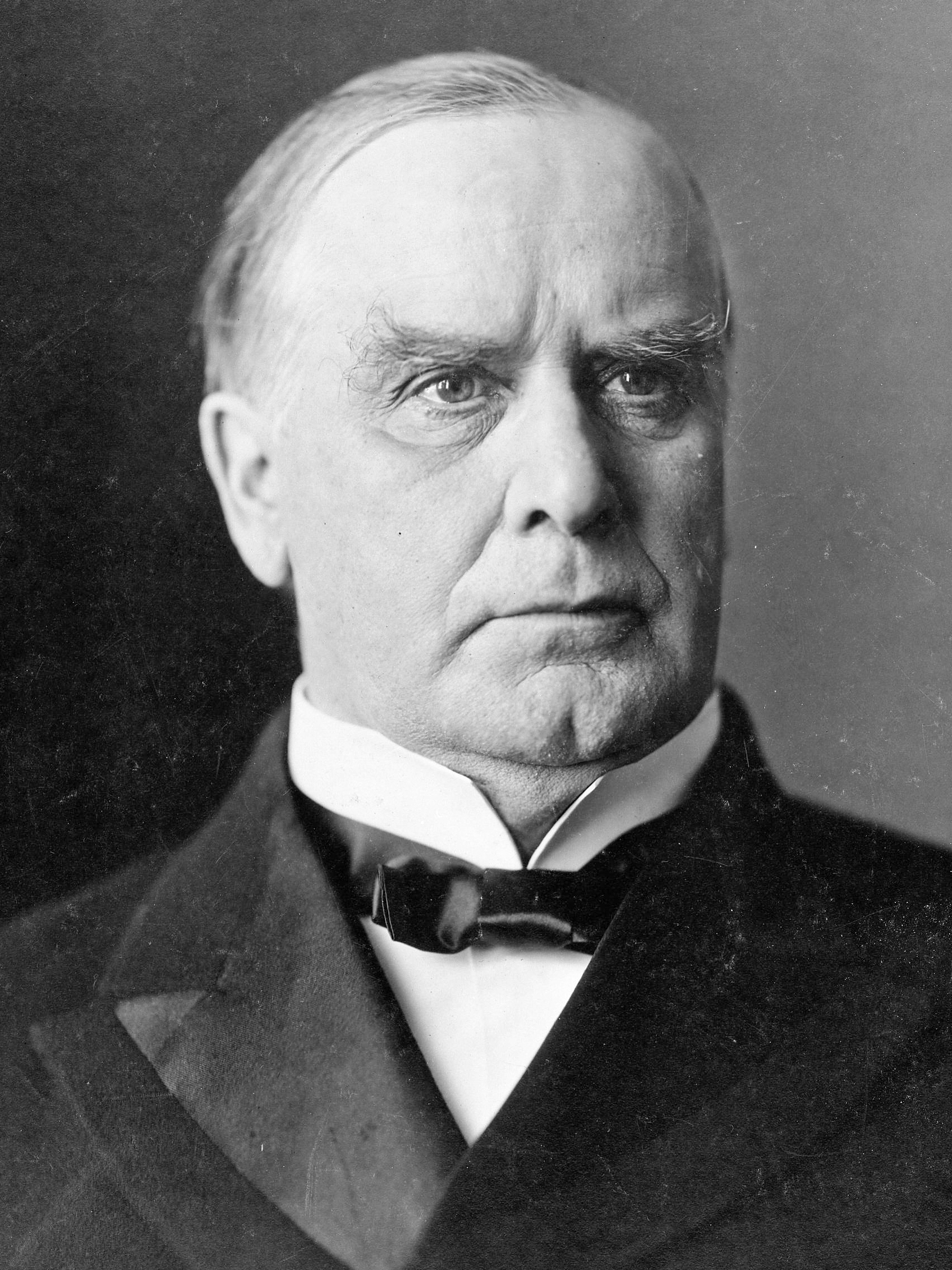

Nominee	William McKinley	William Jennings Bryan
Party	Republican	Democratic
Home state	Ohio	Nebraska
Running mate	Theodore Roosevelt	Adlai E. Stevenson
Electoral vote	4	0
Popular vote	33,784	19,812
Percentage	59.74%	35.04%

McKinley
40–50%
50–60%
60–70%
70–80%
80–90%
90–100%
President before election
William McKinley
Republican
Elected President
William McKinley
Republican

The 1900 United States presidential election in Rhode Island took place on November 6, 1900, as part of the 1900 United States presidential election. Voters chose four representatives, or electors to the Electoral College, who voted for president and vice president.

Rhode Island overwhelmingly voted for the Republican nominee, President William McKinley, over the Democratic nominee, former U.S. Representative and 1896 Democratic presidential nominee William Jennings Bryan. McKinley won Rhode Island by a margin of 24.7% in this rematch of the 1896 presidential election. The return of economic prosperity and recent victory in the Spanish–American War helped McKinley to score a decisive victory.

Bryan had previously lost Rhode Island to McKinley four years earlier and would later lose the state again in 1908 to William Howard Taft.

== Results ==
1900 United States presidential election in Rhode Island
Party	Candidate	Running mate	Popular vote		Electoral vote	
Party	Candidate	Running mate	Count	%	Count	%
Republican	William McKinley of Ohio (incumbent)	Theodore Roosevelt of New York	33,784	59.74%	4	100.00%
Democratic	William Jennings Bryan of Nebraska	Adlai Ewing Stevenson I of Illinois	19,812	35.04%	0	0.00%
Prohibition	John Granville Woolley of Illinois	Henry Brewer Metcalf of Rhode Island	1,529	2.70%	0	0.00%
Socialist Labor	Joseph F. Malloney of Massachusetts	Valentine Remmel of Pennsylvania	1,423	2.52%	0	0.00%
Total			56,198	100.00%	4	100.00%

== See also ==
- United States presidential elections in Rhode Island
