= Fernand St Germain =

American politician

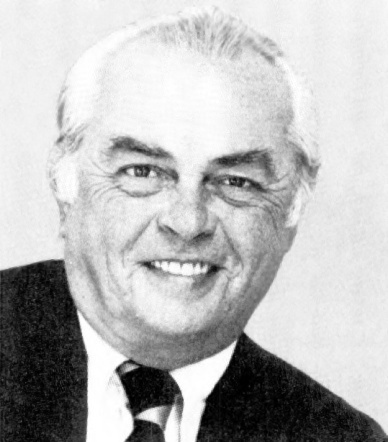

Member of the U.S. House of Representatives from Rhode Island's 1st district
- In office January 3, 1961 – January 3, 1989
- Preceded by: Aime Forand
- Succeeded by: Ronald Machtley

Member of the Rhode Island House of Representatives
- In office 1952–1961

Personal details
- Born: January 9, 1928 Blackstone, Massachusetts, U.S.
- Died: August 16, 2014 (aged 86) Newport, Rhode Island, U.S.
- Party: Democratic Party
- Education: Providence College; Boston University Law School
- Occupation: Attorney

Military service
- Allegiance: United States
- Branch/service: United States Army
- Years of service: 1949 – 1952
- Fernand St Germain's voice Germain discusses H.R.4917, the Depository Institution Examination Improvement Act of 1986; Recorded September 29, 1986

Fernand Joseph St Germain (January 9, 1928 – August 16, 2014) was an American politician from Rhode Island. He was a member of the Democratic Party and served in the Rhode Island House of Representatives and the United States House of Representatives. He is best known for his sponsorship of the Garn–St. Germain Depository Institutions Act, which deregulated the savings and loan association industry.

== Early life ==
Born in Blackstone, Massachusetts, he was raised and attended parochial schools in Woonsocket, Rhode Island. He graduated from Our Lady of Providence Seminary High School, 1945, and from Providence College in 1948. He served in the United States Army as a pharmacy and laboratory technician from 1949 to 1952. St Germain did not spell his name with a period saying that he was no saint.

== Career ==
In 1952, at the age of 24, St Germain won a seat in the Rhode Island House of Representatives. Three years later, he graduated from Boston University School of Law and was admitted to the bar.

In 1960, he was elected to Congress, where he would serve 14 terms. He later joined the United States House Committee on Financial Services, becoming the committee chairman in 1981. In 1982, he and United States Senate member Jake Garn from Utah sponsored the Garn–St. Germain Depository Institutions Act. One of the act’s primary features was its deregulation of the savings and loan industry. Although the provisions of the act were to protect thrift savings institutions from rapidly rising interest rates by allowing them to offer new deposit accounts and make additional types of loans, its loosening of regulations arguably precipitated the Savings and loan crisis.

St Germain voted for the Abandoned Shipwrecks Act of 1987. The Act asserts United States title to certain abandoned shipwrecks located on or embedded in submerged lands under state jurisdiction, and transfers title to the respective state, thereby empowering states to manage these cultural and historical resources more efficiently, with the goal of preventing treasure hunters and salvagers from damaging them. President Ronald Reagan signed it into law on April 28, 1988.

In 1985, St Germain was accused of using his office for personal benefit. The Wall Street Journal published an investigation into the Congressman’s finances. The Journal examined his financial disclosures and found that he was able to secure no-down-payment loans of $1.3 million to acquire several IHOP (International House of Pancakes) restaurants even though he only had a salary of $42,500 per year.

An aide in St Germain’s office contacted federal regulators repeatedly about the application of Florida Federal Savings and Loan to convert to stock ownership. After the application was approved, St Germain made a $15,000 investment in the company’s stock. The chairman of the S&L told the Journal that he did offer St Germain access to real estate deals not available to the general public but contended that he did not request assistance with the application.

Although the United States Department of Justice and the United States House Committee on Ethics both declined to pursue charges against him, the controversy factored into his 1986 and 1988 re-election efforts. In 1986, Republican John Holmes gave him his first tough race in many years, taking 42% of the vote. But St Germain had to spend more than twice what he had in the prior election. Holmes attacked him for taking $35,000 from a developer.

Republican Ronald Machtley defeated him in November 1988 in a campaign that was notable for Machtley taking a live pig named "Les Pork" on the campaign trail to emphasize his commitment to reducing pork barrel spending by Congress.

== Death ==
A resident of Newport, Rhode Island, St Germain died of kidney failure on August 16, 2014, at his home in Newport.

== Award and honors ==
- 1985 : Honorary degree from Brown University (LL.D.)

== See also ==
- List of members of the American Legion

U.S. House of Representatives
Preceded by Aime Forand	Member of the U.S. House of Representatives from Rhode Island's 1st congressional district 1961–1989	Succeeded by Ronald Machtley
Political offices
Preceded by Henry S. Reuss; Wisconsin	Chairman of the House Banking, Finance and Urban Affairs Committee; 1981–1989	Succeeded by Henry B. Gonzalez; Texas
