= Charles Fogarty =

American politician

Charlie Fogarty

67th Lieutenant Governor of Rhode Island
- In office January 2, 1999 – January 2, 2007
- Governor: Lincoln Almond; Don Carcieri
- Preceded by: Bernard Jackvony
- Succeeded by: Elizabeth H. Roberts

43rd Chair of the National Lieutenant Governors Association
- In office 2002–2003
- Preceded by: Gary Sherrer
- Succeeded by: Karl Ohs

Member of the Rhode Island Senate from the 27th district
- In office January 1991 – January 1999
- Preceded by: Joan R. Wiesner
- Succeeded by: Paul Fogarty

Personal details
- Born: Charles Joseph Fogarty Jr. September 15, 1955 (age 70) Providence, Rhode Island, U.S.
- Party: Democratic
- Education: Providence College (BA); University of Rhode Island (MPA)

Charles Joseph Fogarty, Jr., also known as Charlie Fogarty (born September 15, 1955) is an American politician who was the 67th lieutenant governor of Rhode Island. He is a Democrat. Fogarty served two full terms as lieutenant governor, first elected to the position in 1998 and leaving office on January 2, 2007.

His father, Charles Fogarty, Sr., was a state senator and director of the Rhode Island Small Business Administration. His uncle, John E. Fogarty, was a United States congressman for 26 years. His brother Paul Fogarty was elected as a Rhode Island state senator in 1998 and still holds the position.

A graduate of the La Salle Academy and Providence College, Fogarty received a master's degree in public administration from the University of Rhode Island.

Fogarty was previously elected to the Glocester Town Council in 1984 and in 1990 was elected as a state senator, where he served for eight years. While a state senator, he served as both majority whip and Senate President Pro Tempore.

He was elected lieutenant governor in 1998 and re-elected in 2002. He served as lieutenant governor from 1999 to 2007.

Fogarty was a candidate for Governor of Rhode Island in 2006. He was running against incumbent Republican governor Donald Carcieri, as Fogarty was barred from seeking re-election in 2006 due to term limits. His campaign issues included health care, small businesses, university tuition fees and speaking against corruption and the extension of gambling locally. He was defeated by around 8,000 votes.

Rhode Island is one of 19 states that elects its governor and lieutenant governor separately rather than on a single party ticket.

Fogarty was appointed by Governor Lincoln Chafee in January 2011 as the director for the Rhode Island Department of Labor and Training.

In 2015, Fogarty was appointed by Governor Gina Raimondo as director of the Rhode Island Department of Elderly Affairs. He retired from the post in 2018.

== Electoral history ==
- 2006 race for governor
  - Donald Carcieri (R) (inc.), 51%
  - Charles Fogarty (D), 49%
- 2002 race for lieutenant governor
  - Charles Fogarty (D) (inc.), 54%
  - John Pagliarini (R), 25%
  - Robert J. Healey (I), 19%
  - Gregg Stevens (Grn.), 3%
- 1998 race for lieutenant governor
  - Charles Fogarty (D), 50%
  - Bernard Jackvony (R) (inc.), 44%

Political offices
Preceded by Bernard Jackvony	Lieutenant Governor of Rhode Island; 1999–2007	Succeeded by Elizabeth Roberts
Party political offices
Preceded by Myrth York	Democratic nominee for Governor of Rhode Island; 2006	Succeeded by Frank Caprio
