= Lincoln Almond =

American attorney and politician (1936–2023)

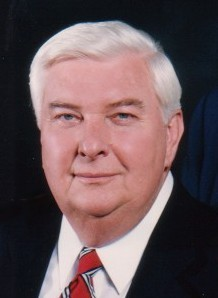

72nd Governor of Rhode Island
- In office January 3, 1995 – January 7, 2003
- Lieutenant: Robert Weygand; Bernard Jackvony; Charles Fogarty
- Preceded by: Bruce Sundlun
- Succeeded by: Donald Carcieri

United States Attorney for the District of Rhode Island
- In office 1981–1993
- President: Ronald Reagan; George H. W. Bush
- Preceded by: Paul Murray
- Succeeded by: Sheldon Whitehouse
- In office 1969–1978
- President: Richard Nixon; Gerald Ford; Jimmy Carter
- Preceded by: Edward P. Gallogly
- Succeeded by: Paul Murray

Personal details
- Born: Lincoln Carter Almond; June 16, 1936 Pawtucket, Rhode Island, U.S.
- Died: January 2, 2023 (aged 86)
- Party: Republican
- Spouse: Marilyn Johnson (m. 1958)
- Children: 2
- Education: University of Rhode Island (BS); Boston University (JD)

Lincoln Carter Almond (June 16, 1936 – January 2, 2023) was an American attorney and politician who served as the 72nd governor of Rhode Island from 1995 to 2003. A member of the Republican Party, he was previously the U.S. attorney for the District of Rhode Island from 1969 to 1978 and again from 1981 until 1993.

== Early life, education and early career ==
Almond was born on June 16, 1936, in Pawtucket, Rhode Island, to Thomas Clifton Almond and Elsie (Carter) Almond. He grew up in Central Falls until his family moved to Lincoln in 1947. He attended nearby Central Falls High School because there was no high school in Lincoln at the time. He graduated Bachelor of Science degree from University of Rhode Island in 1959 and earned a Juris Doctor degree from Boston University School of Law in 1961. Afterward, he started his career as a practicing attorney in Rhode Island.

Almond was appointed Town Administrator of Lincoln, Rhode Island, in January 1963 and was subsequently elected to three terms, serving in that capacity until June 1969. As town administrator, Almond undertook significant upgrades of the municipal water system and a school construction program, including a high school, to accommodate a rapidly expanding population of school children. He also was responsible for the construction of a new police station and town hall in Lincoln. After his service as town administrator, Almond served as a director and later president of the Blackstone Valley Development Corporation, a not-for-profit corporation that developed industrial parks in Lincoln, Cumberland, and Smithfield.

== Tenure as U.S. Attorney, District of Rhode Island ==
Before being elected governor, Almond served as the U.S. Attorney for the United States District Court for the District of Rhode Island under Presidents Richard Nixon, Gerald Ford, Ronald Reagan, and George H. W. Bush, from 1969 to 1978, and later from 1981 to 1993. With a total of 21 years of service, Almond was one of the longest-serving U.S. Attorneys in the District of Rhode Island. While serving as U.S. Attorney, Almond emphasized enforcement in the area of organized crime, drugs, and white collar crime, including political corruption.

Almond had a number of high-profile accomplishments during his tenure. In 1970, Attorney General Elliot Richardson created an advisory committee of 15 U.S. Attorneys to advise the Attorney General. Almond served on this committee advising Attorneys General Richardson, William Saxbe, Edward Levi, and Griffin Bell on matters of resource allocation, civil and criminal priorities, and federal legislation priorities. Almond oversaw significant drug prosecutions and drug forfeitures that received national attention. During Almond's tenure, Providence, Rhode Island, served as the base of the Patriarca crime family, leading to several high level prosecutions by the New England U.S. Attorneys, including Almond. He supervised a number of political corruption cases primarily in Providence and Pawtucket.

== Tenure as governor ==
Almond ran unsuccessfully for the U.S. Congress in 1968, and he was the unsuccessful Republican nominee for governor in 1978, when he was defeated by incumbent Governor J. Joseph Garrahy. In what was considered an upset in the 1994 Republican primary for governor, Almond marked his political comeback by defeating the heavily favored Republican candidate, U.S. Rep. Ron Machtley. He went on to defeat Democratic State Sen. Myrth York, who had scored her own upset by defeating incumbent Gov. Bruce Sundlun in the Democratic primary. He was the first governor to serve a four-year term under changes to the Rhode Island Constitution, and was the first to be bound by a two-term limit. Previous statewide terms of office were two years, with no term limits.

=== Health care ===
Health care and human services was an emphasis during the Almond administration. RIte Care, the state public health care program for children was significantly expanded during his administration, he instituted an aggressive childhood immunization program, and expanded state funded prenatal care programs, resulting in lowered rates of low-weight births. Almond greatly increased the number of state-subsidized child care slots, standards for child care providers were raised, and health care through the state also was offered to child care providers. During the Almond administration, Rhode Island was among the states with the highest percentage of its residents with health insurance coverage.

=== Education ===
In the realm of higher education, Almond advocated strongly for passage of a 2000 bond referendum that included funding for a new Newport campus of the Community College of Rhode Island (CCRI). With CCRI an affordable entryway to college for many lower income students, Almond was successful in having the tuition frozen there for most of his years in office. Almond directed funds to improve the buildings and dormitories at Rhode Island College (RIC), and promoted the building of the Nazarian Performing Arts Center at RIC.

As the first University of Rhode Island (URI) graduate to be elected governor, Almond made major investments in URI, starting with the physical infrastructure, which was badly neglected. The steam plant was upgraded and several dormitories were renovated and wired for Internet access. Several academic buildings were refurbished as well. The Ryan Center, a 7,600-seat sports and event complex that was completed in 2002, is located at One Lincoln Almond Way at URI.

=== Tax policy and regulatory reforms ===
Through tax incentives and regulatory reforms, the state was able to encourage the growth of industries such as financial services, biotechnology, and the marine trades. The historic preservation tax credit signed into law by Governor Almond in 2001 led to projects, such as the rehabilitation of the Masonic Temple as a hotel in Providence. The Quonset Davisville Port and Commerce Park, was greatly expanded in terms of number of businesses and level of employment. Almond was a strong advocate to transform the existing port at Quonset into a privately owned, compact container port.

To make the state more competitive, Almond was successful in overseeing a five-year plan to reduce the state's income tax by 10% and to begin the phase out of the tax on capital gains. There were 45 other tax reductions enacted during Almond's time in office, including instituting one of the nation's highest research and development and investment tax credits.

=== Capital projects and infrastructure ===
The Rhode Island Capital Plan Fund, created by Almond, allowed the state to pay for projects out of current revenues instead of seeking funds from bonds. Every part of the state has benefited from the Rhode Island Capital Plan Fund, from World War II Memorial Park in Woonsocket to the new pavilion at Misquamicut State Beach in Westerly. The Governor directed funds to many of the state's recreational areas, including the boat ramps in East Providence and Bristol, as well as fishing industry piers at Galilee and Newport. The years of renovating the Rhode Island State House was recognized by the National Trust for Historic Preservation in 2002.

During his tenure as governor, Almond was active in planning and authorizing a number of infrastructure projects in Quonset Point, including construction of Rhode Island Route 403. Additionally, he was planning for the construction of a third track along the rail line from Quonset Point to the point in Central Falls where the line branches off toward the CSX rail yard in Worcester, Massachusetts, including the raising of bridges to accommodate container and autoracks, thus allowing a heavy freight rail connection to most of the United States. The Iway project, a major relocation of Interstate 195 (Rhode Island-Massachusetts), was designed and construction began during the Almond administration.

=== Casinos and lottery ===
Almond was a strong opponent to the expansion of gambling in the state during his eight years as governor, despite the growth of two major casinos in nearby southeastern Connecticut. He successfully fought every attempt to bring casino gambling into Rhode Island, and repeatedly urged the Rhode Island Lottery Commission not to expand video lottery terminals at existing gaming establishments in the state.

=== Environmental policy ===
In the realm of environmental issues, as a result of the 1996 North Cape barge oil spill, Almond negotiated a safe dredging plan for Narragansett Bay with the U.S. Army Corps of Engineers. The dredging project was important to allow direct delivery of petroleum products by ship to the ports of Providence and Fall River instead of barges that pose greater environmental risk. He also came to an agreement with the Narragansett Bay Commission on a funding plan and project scope for a major project to collect and store storm water runoff in the Providence area for storage and treatment before release into Narragansett Bay. However, Almond generated controversy in the fall of 2001 due to his refusal to declare a state of emergency when the town of Pascoag's water was contaminated with MTBE.

== Later work ==
After leaving office, Almond was appointed in 2005 by Governor Donald Carcieri to lead an investigation of practices in the Beacon Mutual Insurance Company, a workers compensation insurer created by the State of Rhode Island in 1994. The highly critical report led to substantial changes of leadership and practices within the company.

In 2006, the Rhode Island General Assembly approved a voter referendum to allow Harrah's Entertainment to operate a casino in partnership with the Narragansett Indian Tribe. Almond led a coalition of opponents to the proposal, and despite heavy advertising expenditures by Harrah's, the proposal was defeated.

== Personal life and death ==
Lincoln Almond and his wife Marilyn lived in Kingston, Rhode Island, and Wellfleet, Massachusetts. They had two children. Their son, Lincoln Douglas Almond, became a federal magistrate judge in Rhode Island. Almond was an Episcopalian and a member of St. George's Church in Central Falls.

Almond died on January 2, 2023, at the age of 86.

== Electoral history ==
- 1994 Race for Governor – Republican Primary
  - Lincoln Almond (R), 58%
  - Ron Machtley (R), 42%

Rhode Island gubernatorial election, 1994
Party	Candidate	Votes	%	±%
Republican	Lincoln Almond	171,194	47.37%	+13.10%
Democratic	Myrth York	157,361	43.54%	−18.01%
Cool Moose Party	Robert J. Healey	32,822	9.08%	

Rhode Island gubernatorial election, 1998
Party	Candidate	Votes	%	±%
Republican	Lincoln Almond (incumbent)	156,180	50.97%	+3.59%
Democratic	Myrth York	129,105	42.13%	−1.41%
Cool Moose Party	Robert J. Healey	19,250	6.28%	
Reform	Joseph F. Devine	1,848	0.60%	
Write-ins		62	0.02%	

Legal offices
Preceded by Edward P. Gallogly	United States Attorney for the District of Rhode Island; 1969–1978	Succeeded by Paul Murray
Preceded by Paul Murray	United States Attorney for the District of Rhode Island; 1981–1993	Succeeded by Sheldon Whitehouse
Party political offices
Preceded by James Taft	Republican nominee for Governor of Rhode Island; 1978	Succeeded by Buddy Cianci
Preceded by Elizabeth Leonard	Republican nominee for Governor of Rhode Island; 1994, 1998	Succeeded by Donald Carcieri
Political offices
Preceded by Bruce Sundlun	Governor of Rhode Island; 1995–2003	Succeeded by Donald Carcieri
