= Myrth York =

American politician (born 1946)

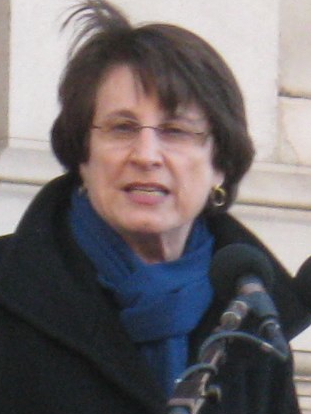

Member of the Rhode Island Senate from the 2nd district
- In office 1991–1995
- Preceded by: Sean O. Coffey
- Succeeded by: John M. Roney

Personal details
- Born: June 7, 1946 (age 80) Maplewood, New Jersey, U.S.
- Party: Democratic
- Relations: Otto H. York (father)
- Education: University of Denver (BA); Boston University (JD, LLM)

Myrth York (born June 7, 1946) is an American attorney and politician who served as a member of the Rhode Island Senate from 1991 to 1994. She ran unsuccessfully for governor of Rhode Island in 1994, 1998, and 2002.

== Early life and education ==
York was born in Maplewood, New Jersey. She is the daughter of chemical engineer, entrepreneur and philanthropist Otto H. York. She earned her Bachelor of Arts from the University of Denver in 1968 and Juris Doctor from the Boston University School of Law in 1972. She earned a Master of Laws in Taxation from Boston University in 1979.

== Career ==
York served in the Rhode Island Senate from 1991 to 1994, and on the Senate Corporations Committee and the Senate Health, Education and Welfare Committee. During her second term she was chairman of the HEW Committee. In the Senate she was known for being strongly liberal on social issues and defending the rights of women and minorities.

York was fellow for the Institute of Politics at Harvard Kennedy School during spring of 1999.

York first ran for governor in 1994, losing to Republican Lincoln Almond by three percentage points. She lost to Almond by nine points in 1998 and to Donald Carcieri by 10 points in 2002. In her first bid for governor, she ousted incumbent Bruce Sundlun in the Democratic primary, winning by over 30 percentage points.

The 2002 campaign was particularly costly to York as she spent $3.8 million of her own money to finance what was to be her last bid for elected office. A key turning point in the campaign was when York criticized Carcieri for the actions of businesses he had been associated with but refused to answer Carcieri's request that she reveal what companies her personal assets were invested in.

In 2006 she endorsed Republican Senator Lincoln Chafee in his unsuccessful bid for re-election. (Chafee's Democratic opponent, Sheldon Whitehouse, had run against York in the 2002 Democratic gubernatorial primary). In the endorsement, York said that Chafee would be the first Republican she voted for since Richard Nixon.

York was appointed to the Providence Zoning Board of Review and was re-appointed by incoming Mayor Angel Taveras in 2011. She currently serves as the Board's chair.

York has received many awards, including the United Way's Legislator of the Year Award and the Claiborne Pell Award for outstanding service to the arts and people with disabilities.

Rhode Island Senate
Preceded by Sean O. Coffey	Member of the Rhode Island Senate from the 2nd district 1991–1995	Succeeded by John M. Roney
Party political offices
Preceded by Bruce Sundlun	Democratic nominee for Governor of Rhode Island; 1994, 1998, 2002	Succeeded by Charles Fogarty
