= 1994 Rhode Island gubernatorial election =

- November 8, 1994
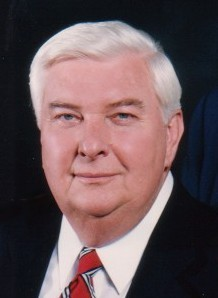

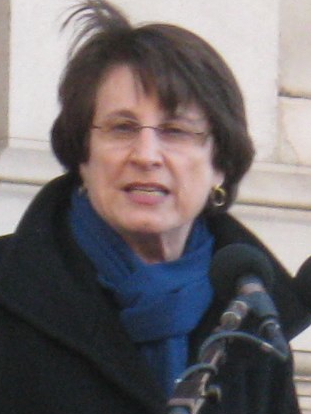

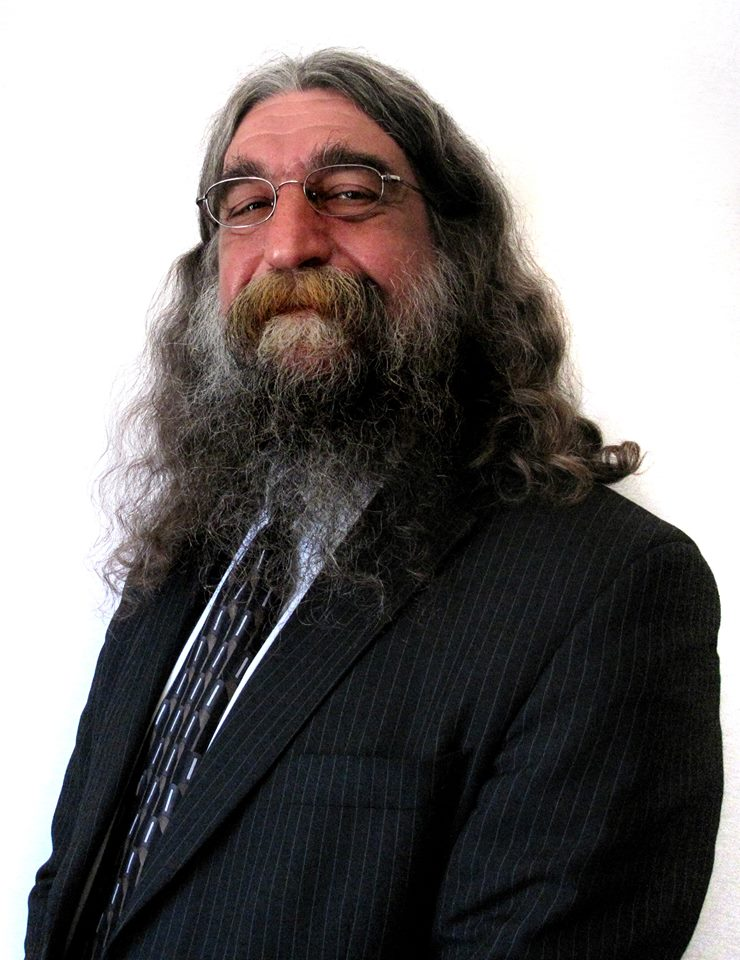
Nominee	Lincoln Almond	Myrth York	Robert J. Healey
Party	Republican	Democratic	Independent
Popular vote	171,194	157,361	32,822
Percentage	47.37%	43.54%	9.08%
- Almond: 40–50% 50–60% 60–70% York: 40–50% 50–60% Healey: 30–40%
Governor before election
Bruce Sundlun
Democratic
Elected Governor
Lincoln Almond
Republican

The 1994 Rhode Island gubernatorial election took place on November 8, 1994. Republican Lincoln Almond defeated Democrat Myrth York and independent candidate Robert J. Healey. Incumbent Democrat Bruce Sundlun was defeated by York in the Democratic primary.

Almond was the first governor elected to a four-year term, as opposed to two years.

== Democratic primary ==
=== Candidates ===
- Myrth York, former Rhode Island state senator
- Bruce Sundlun, incumbent governor of Rhode Island
- Louise Durfee, former director of the Rhode Island Department of Environmental Management, former Tiverton city councilwoman
- Donald Gill

=== Results ===
Democratic primary results
Party	Candidate	Votes	%
Democratic	Myrth York	56,719	57.22
Democratic	Bruce Sundlun (incumbent)	27,432	27.67
Democratic	Louise Durfee	11,914	12.02
Democratic	Donald Gill	3,067	3.09
Total votes		99,132	100.00

== Republican primary ==
=== Candidates ===
- Lincoln Almond, former U.S. attorney for the District of Rhode Island
- Ronald Machtley, U.S. representative

=== Results ===
Republican primary results
Party	Candidate	Votes	%
Republican	Lincoln Almond	26,873	59.69
Republican	Ronald Machtley	18,150	40.31
Total votes		45,023	100.00

== Independents ==
- Robert J. Healey, businessman

== General election ==
=== Polling ===
Source	Date	Almond (R)	York (D)
Brown University	Oct. 2, 1994	38%	37%

=== Results ===
Rhode Island gubernatorial election, 1994
Party	Candidate	Votes	%	±%
Republican	Lincoln Almond	171,194	47.37%	+13.10%
Democratic	Myrth York	157,361	43.54%	−18.01%
Independent	Robert J. Healey	32,822	9.08%	
Majority		13,833	3.83%	−23.45%
Turnout		362,377		
Republican gain from Democratic		Swing		

==== By county ====
	Lincoln Almond Republican		Myrth York Democratic		Robert J. Healey Independent	
County	Votes	%	Votes	%	Votes	%
Bristol	8,320	43.1%	7,164	37.1%	3,815	19.8%
Kent	33,511	49.5%	27,546	40.7%	6,600	9.8%
Newport	13,082	43.9%	13,772	46.2%	2,939	9.9%
Providence	95,425	47.2%	90,722	44.9%	15,852	7.8%
Washington	20,856	48.9%	18,157	42.6%	3,616	8.5%

Counties that flipped from Democratic to Republican

- Bristol
- Providence
- Washington
- Kent
