= 1986 Rhode Island gubernatorial election =

- November 4, 1986
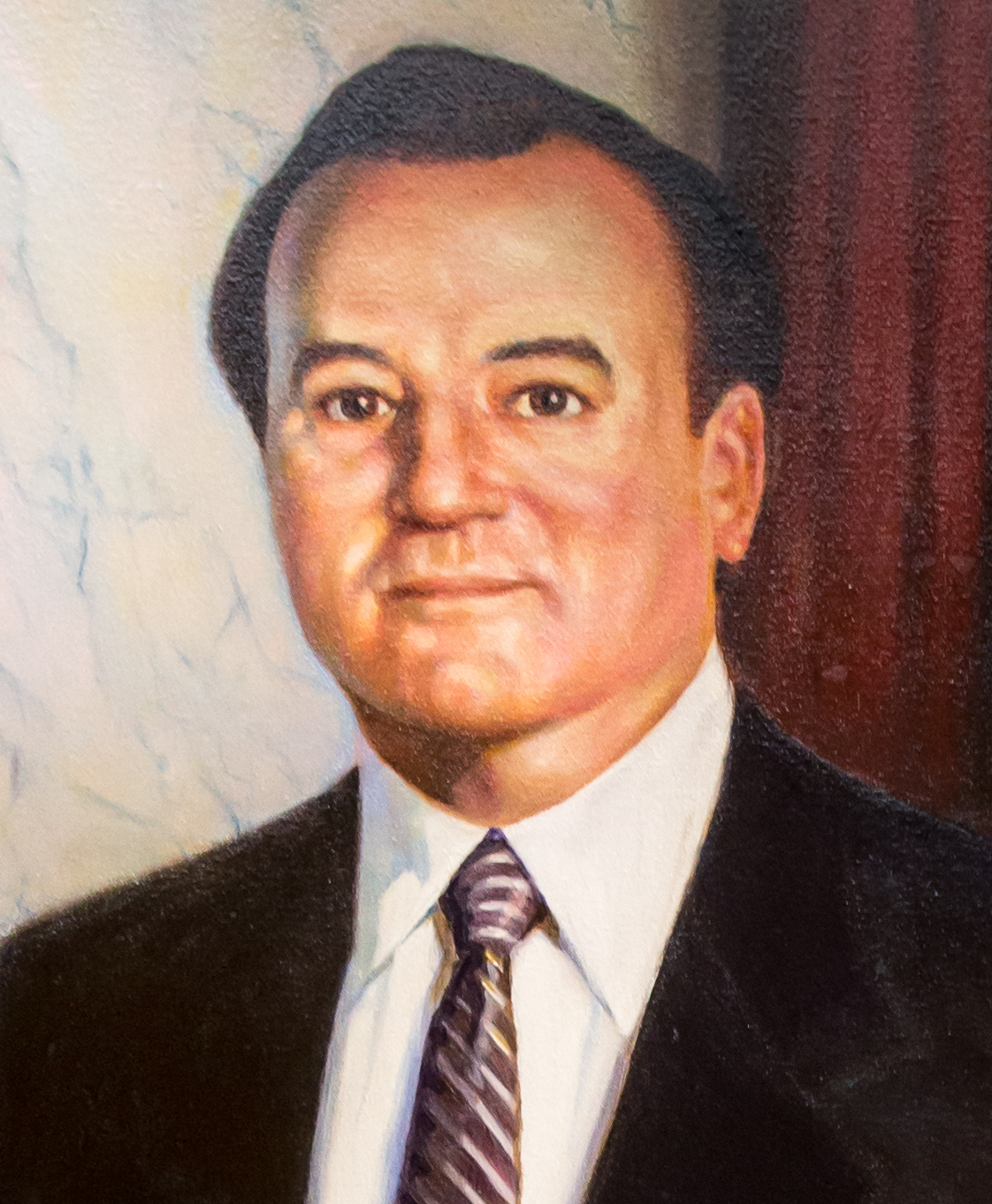

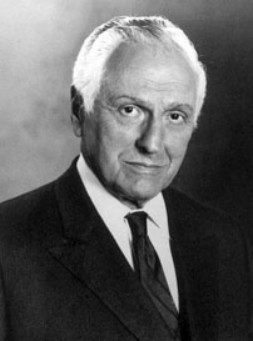
Nominee	Edward D. DiPrete	Bruce Sundlun
Party	Republican	Democratic
Popular vote	208,822	104,504
Percentage	64.70%	32.38%
- DiPrete: 50–60% 60–70% 70–80% 80–90%
Governor before election
Edward D. DiPrete
Republican
Elected Governor
Edward D. DiPrete
Republican

The 1986 Rhode Island gubernatorial election was held on November 4, 1986. Incumbent Republican Edward D. DiPrete defeated Democratic nominee Bruce Sundlun with 64.70% of the vote.

Two years later, DiPrete would defeat Sundlun again, though only narrowly, and in four years, DiPrete would lose reelection to Sundlun in a landslide.

== Primary elections ==
Primary elections were held on September 9, 1986.

=== Democratic primary ===
==== Candidates ====
- Bruce Sundlun, businessman
- Steve White

==== Results ====
Democratic primary results
Party	Candidate	Votes	%
Democratic	Bruce Sundlun	43,120	75.33
Democratic	Steve White	14,124	24.67
Total votes		57,244	100.00

== General election ==
=== Candidates ===
Major party candidates

- Edward D. DiPrete, Republican
- Bruce Sundlun, Democratic

Other candidates

- Robert J. Healey, Independent
- Tony Affigne, Independent

=== Results ===
1986 Rhode Island gubernatorial election
Party	Candidate	Votes	%	±%
Republican	Edward D. DiPrete (incumbent)	208,822	64.70%	
Democratic	Bruce Sundlun	104,504	32.38%	
Independent	Robert J. Healey	5,964	1.85%	
Independent	Tony Affigne	3,481	1.08%	
Majority		104,314		
Turnout		322,724		
Republican hold		Swing		

==== By county ====
	Edward DiPrete Republican		Bruce Sundlun Democratic		All Others	
County	Votes	%	Votes	%	Votes	%
Bristol	10,810	64.5%	4,776	28.5%	1,183	7.1%
Kent	38,121	67.0%	17,380	30.6%	1,359	2.4%
Newport	16,542	63.3%	8,772	33.6%	807	3.1%
Providence	120,681	63.5%	64,312	33.8%	5,091	2.7%
Washington	22,668	68.8%	9,264	28.1%	1,005	3.1%
