= Rhode Island banking crisis =

1990s banking emergency

The Rhode Island banking crisis took place in the early 1990s, when approximately a third of the U.S. state of Rhode Island's population lost access to funds in their bank accounts. The events were triggered by the failure of a Providence bank, Heritage Loan & Investment, due to long-term embezzlement by its president. News of its problems led to a bank run in which customers tried to withdraw money from the bank which did not have enough money available. In normal circumstances, depositors would be protected by the bank's insurance, but the state's private insurer had a long history of problems and was unable to fulfill its commitments. When the insurer collapsed, Governor Bruce Sundlun announced the closure of 45 credit unions and banks just hours after his inauguration.

In the first banking emergency in the state since the Great Depression, 300,000 depositors lost access to their money. Though some of the institutions reopened relatively quickly after obtaining federal insurance, many did not qualify and remained closed for an extended period of time. The state government set up an agency to manage the crisis, selling $697 million in bonds to repay people while filing about 300 lawsuits against the closed institutions and other companies that played a role in the crisis.

The shutdown sparked demonstrations and protests. Corruption hearings added to public frustration, when several executives and public officials were called to testify about their last minute withdrawals from banks just before their closure. The manhunt for Joseph Mollicone Jr, the Heritage Loan & Investment president who had fled to Utah, took nearly 18 months before he turned himself in. He was convicted, and given what at that time was the state's most severe sentence for a "white collar" offense.

Though all depositors were eventually repaid, most had to wait months or years for compensation. Most of the big banks remained closed for more than a year, and several never reopened.

== Heritage Loan & Investment failure ==
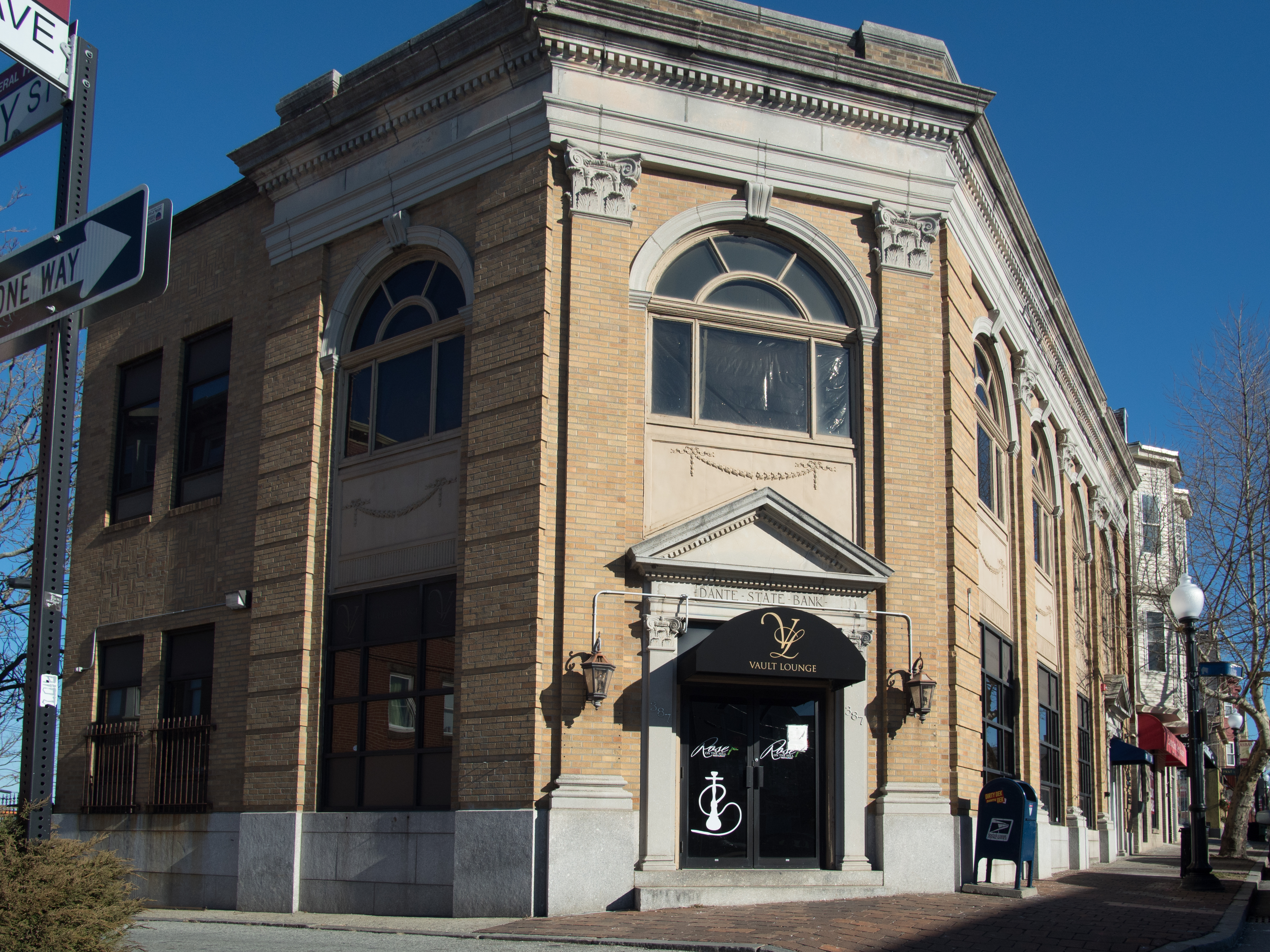
The former Heritage Loan & Investment building on Federal Hill, home to a lounge as of 2018

Heritage Loan & Investment was a bank in the Federal Hill neighborhood of Providence, Rhode Island. In 1990, examiners with the state's Department of Business Regulation (DBR) discovered $13 million of fraudulent loans in the bank's records that had purportedly been made to 128 people and businesses that never asked for or received a loan. The loans had been fabricated by bank president, Joseph Mollicone Jr., who began taking money from the bank in 1986 and had set up more than 90 businesses to funnel the money through. The Providence Journal reported that "he became legendary for dodging questions about missing bank records, once suggesting to a bank examiner: 'Let's have a muffin'."

In October 1990, the bank's insurer, the Rhode Island Share and Deposit Indemnity Corporation (RISDIC), took control of the bank following an examination that revealed its poor state. When Mollicone learned authorities had caught on to his illicit activities, he fled the state, disappearing on November 8, 1990, after boarding a plane at Logan International Airport in Boston. A grand jury investigation opened a few days later, on November 13. As Heritage customers learned what was happening, there was a bank run in which they withdrew $13 million of the bank's $22 million in total deposits. On November 18, Governor Edward D. DiPrete closed the bank on what was supposed to be a temporary basis, while officials tried to determine what was going on and control the damage.

On November 26, Mollicone was charged with embezzlement and considered a fugitive. By the time he left, Mollicone had taken more than 80% of the money people deposited at the bank, according to prosecutor Kevin Bristow. The state attorney general's office estimated that he stole $15.2 million overall. The bank opened again on December 4 to allow depositors to withdraw the rest of their funds, before closing again.

== Rhode Island Share and Deposit Indemnity Corporation ==
=== Background ===
The Heritage Loan & Investment bank was insured by the Rhode Island Share and Deposit Indemnity Corporation (RISDIC), a state-chartered nominally private enterprise which backed 45 of the state's credit unions and banks. It started operating in 1971 and was intended to insure only small institutions, with $134 million insured in 1972. It expanded quickly, though, increasing to $761 million insured in 1980. It continued to grow through the 1980s, enabled by loosened state and federal laws.

Between the mid-1970s and early-1990s, several state-chartered, privately operated insurance entities failed, beginning with Mississippi in 1976, then Nebraska and California in 1983. The 1980s saw a trend of banks and credit unions, often at the urging of state-level insurers, shifting to federal insurers, the Federal Deposit Insurance Corporation (FDIC) or the National Credit Union Administration (NCUA). The trend became particularly pronounced after Ohio and Maryland, the largest state-chartered funds, collapsed in 1985, causing bank crises in those states. RISDIC, however, did not learn from the mistakes of other states. To the contrary, it even increased the maximum deposit it would insure. When it was founded, the per-account maximum to be insured was $40,000, but that number increased to $500,000 in late 1985, with no limit on some accounts. When RISDIC lost some of its most stable banks, it began insuring more weak institutions. By the late 1980s, RISDIC was riddled with problems. It insured primarily those institutions that were unable to secure federal insurance, guaranteeing large sums of money at weak banks.

Concerns had been raised about RISDIC for years before its collapse. Federal regulators, the Federal Reserve Bank of Boston, and others issued warnings as early as 1985. The state attorney general, Arlene Violet, made several attempts to draw attention to RISDIC's vulnerability without success. When Violet entered office, she began attending bank board of incorporation meetings and was struck by the way the group charged with overseeing the state's banking system seemed to allow favors to politically connected people. After seeing problems with the insurer's financial reports, she tasked members of her white collar crime unit with producing a report about the company. The finished report, completed in December 1985, highlighted financial risks as well as various conflicts of interest involved in its management and regulation. It led to the proposed bill in 1986 that would require RISDIC-insured institutions to obtain federal insurance, effectively closing the insurer. It was supported by the DiPrete administration but failed in the state General Assembly. The report was not made public, but in the days after the bank closure, it was leaked to the Providence Journal, which printed it in its entirety.

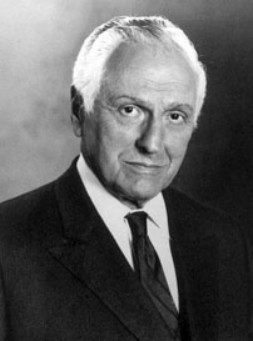
Rhode Island Governor Bruce Sundlun closed 45 banks and credit unions on the day of his inauguration.

A significant problem was lack of oversight. Members of RISDIC's board of trustees were primarily managers of the institutions it insured. There were no formal rules requiring any outside board members, resulting in only three members appointed to represent the public and fifteen with conflicts of interest, representing insured banks. In the late 1980s, government budget cuts moved the responsibility for conducting examinations of the insurer from the Department of Business Regulation (DBR) to RISDIC itself, further reducing outside and independent oversight. In addition to being poorly regulated, it failed to abide by standard industry practices and although it formally adopted the standards of the National Association of Share Insurance Corporation, it did not actually implement them effectively. The board failed to review reports by examiners and outside auditors.

According to Pulkkinen and Rosengren, "That RISDIC did not fail earlier was attributable to its political clout and its ability to mask severe financial difficulties within its underlying membership." She said the only reason the legislation to end RISDIC failed was because of problematic relationships between legislators and the banks.

=== Failure ===
The Heritage Loan and Investment collapse came months after Jefferson Loan and Investment Company, another RISDIC-insured bank, folded because of fraudulent leases. Jefferson used up a great deal of RISDIC's resources, leaving them in particularly bad shape when the even more costly Heritage collapse came about in November 1990. The $13-million bank run in November, after customers learned the condition of Heritage, used up a large part of RISDIC's $25-million reserve. At the same time, concerned depositors at other RISDIC-insured institutions began withdrawing their own funds at an increased rate. As a result of the draining of its assets, RISDIC was left insolvent, unable to meet deposit insurance claims.

Several RISDIC-insured institutions began working to obtain federal insurance amid these events. Some were delayed, while many others reconsidered, opting to explore other options upon realizing the stricter controls federal insurance would place on the institutions. The outgoing DiPrete administration prepared a plan to switch RISDIC-insured institutions to federal insurance, but did not act on it because, according to the Providence Journal, "it would be presumptuous for him to do so in the waning days of his term." The incoming administration of Bruce Sundlun planned to act on it in the days or weeks following his inauguration, but action hastened after a letter was delivered from the RISDIC board of directors. On December 31, 1990, the day before Sundlun's inauguration, the RISDIC board voted unanimously to request conservatorship due to "extraordinary liquidity demands ... in recent days."

A retrospective analysis by Walker F. Todd in Economic Commentary found similarities in the failures of the Ohio, Maryland, and Rhode Island systems. Among them were the insurers' influence in state legislatures, failure to act when notified of problems, political authorities downplaying the seriousness of the funds' insolvencies, and, most importantly, "their incapacity to exercise sufficient supervisory authority to limit risks or to impose effective risk-based deposit insurance premiums to make unwise risk-taking more costly for the insured institutions creating the largest risks." Effectively, without enough funds and with too much risk, any single major loss would erode confidence and lead to disaster. On the other hand, whereas weaknesses in the insured institutions themselves were a factor in all three states' funds, Ohio and Maryland institutions were weakened primarily by fraud while Rhode Island was more affected by losses in real estate loans and investments, which occurred across New England between 1989 and 1992.

== Bank closures and aftermath ==
By state law, banks and credit unions cannot legally operate without insurance. Hours after his January 1, 1991, inauguration, Sundlun held a press conference. Due to a "banking emergency," he ordered the indefinite closure of the 45 RISDIC-insured financial institutions, about three-quarters of which were credit unions. Police were posted at all closed banks "to maintain public order," according to officials cited in the Providence Journal. RISDIC-insured institutions were ordered not to accept deposits, grant withdrawals, pay dividends, pay creditors, renew loans, liquidate assets, or incur new debts. They were, however, to pay their own employees as applicable, and to submit plans for continued operation to Maurice C. Paradis, the new business regulation director in the Sundlun administration. Bank customers were, however, expected to repay loans.

It was the first banking emergency in Rhode Island since the bank holidays of the Great Depression in 1933. Over 300,000 people, about a third of the state's population, lost access to their money, totaling about $1.7 billion. Depositors were notified that although they could not make deposits or withdrawals, they would still need to repay loans to those institutions and their money would continue to accrue interest. The state created a central phone hotline through the Department of Business Regulation, which had difficulty keeping up with the high call volume.

By the following day, January 2, all but two of the institutions had applied for federal insurance, and those that were approved reopened relatively quickly: seven reopened the following Monday. However, the FDIC and NCUA declined to provide insurance to some of the institutions that did not meet its standards, highlighting eleven that had been explicitly declined. The FDIC chairman stated that it would not burden itself by providing extra help for the crisis or by repaying depositors if their accounts are salvageable. The seven that quickly reopened accounted for only about ten percent of the total deposits, however, with most of the larger institutions still closed. But the events worried some in the federal government, who sent millions of dollars in cash to help protect against the consequences of bank runs on the larger national and regional banks that had not closed.

According to a Sundlun spokesperson, although the state neither owned nor backed RISDIC, "it was decided that the state had a moral obligation to protect depositors". Sundlun's administration, including later state Superior Court justice Michael A. Silverstein, set up the Depositors Economic Protection Corporation (DEPCO), which sold bonds in order to repay those whose money had been lost. State sales tax was increased from 6% to 7% to help pay for the hundreds of millions of dollars in bonds. The state's troubles were exacerbated by a weak economy and a significant budget deficit at the time of the closure—$162 million on a $1.5 billion budget—legally obligating lawmakers to close the budget gap at the same time as it looked for funds to compensate depositors.

Though the state persisted in taking measures to ensure people recouped their losses, progress was slow. The Governor announced a plan to allow depositors to withdraw up to half of the funds in their accounts up to a certain amount, but repayments to clients of still-closed banks did not begin until six months after the initial closure. Eight months in, 200,000 customers at 13 institutions still could not access their deposits worth about $1.2 billion. After a year, only 36 of the 45 institutions had reopened, and most of the biggest remained closed, including Rhode Island Central, the state's second largest credit union. By that time, depositors with small accounts of $2,500 or less had been repaid in full, but others with money at the nine still-closed institutions had only received about 10% of their funds. Two and a half years after the closure, a small number of depositors still did not have access to their money.

== Public reaction ==
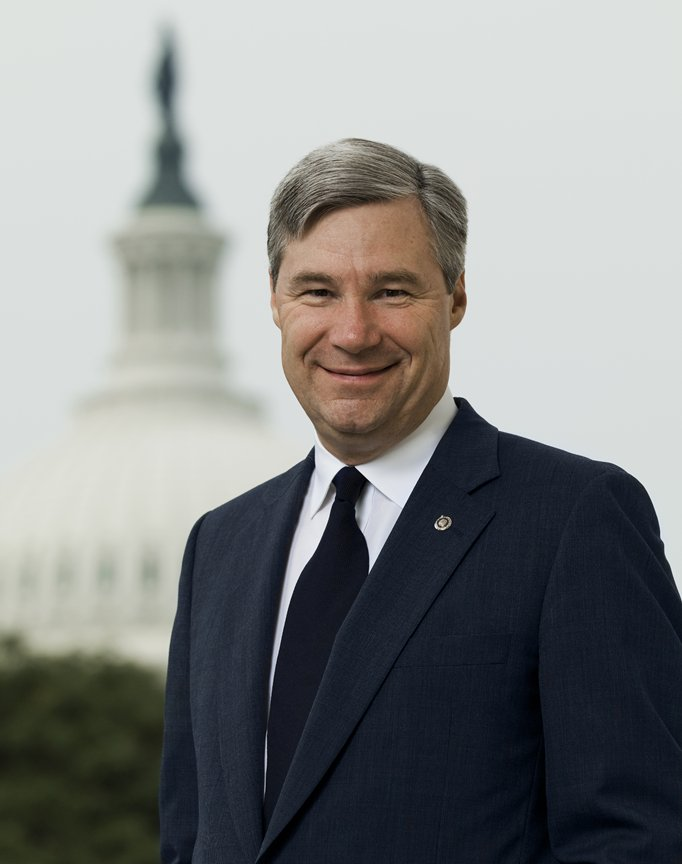
Sheldon Whitehouse, now a U.S. Senator, oversaw much of the banking crisis while working in Sundlun's administration.

Local newspapers regularly printed lists of banks that had been opened or remained closed. Some depositors had houses foreclosed or other property repossessed; some businesses failed, while others had to lay off workers. State representatives worked to make arrangements with federal agencies to ensure those who rely on direct-deposited government checks would receive them directly. The number of bankruptcies in the state increased by 62% between 1990 and 1991. The Rhode Island Community Food Bank had to distribute 30% more food than it did in 1990, totaling four million pounds. Some businesses tried to adapt with an eye towards the crisis' resolution. Grocery chains Almacs and Stop & Shop arranged to continue taking checks from closed banks, to be cashed later.

One of the cities hardest hit was Woonsocket, which already had an unemployment rate over 11% and where more than half of the residents were customers of one of the larger closed credit unions. Businesses had lower revenue and more than 30 closed by the end of February. Group therapy sessions began in the city for elderly residents who relied on the closed credit union.

People began protesting shortly after the announcement. Dedicated activist organizations formed, such as the Warwick-based Citizens for Depositors' Rights. One event organized by the group convened hundreds of protesters in the Statehouse rotunda a few weeks into the closure. Some protests regarded specific developments, such as when the governor's office decided to release a list of all depositors with at least $100,000 locked up in one of the closed banks. The rationale was that it was in the public interest, to foster debate around a new bailout plan which would reimburse up to that number, with funds above $100,000 recouped only after liquidation of banks' assets. People on the list expressed surprise and anger at the unusual privacy breach. Multiple publications described atypical characteristics of the protesters at the various events. A Newsweek article noted there were more elderly participants than one would expect to see at most protests, while UPI wrote that "the demonstrators ranged from people in fisherman's hats to three-piece suits and full-length fur coats." Speaking of the unrest, Sheldon Whitehouse, who handled the crisis for the Sundlun administration as Director of Policy, said "My car was keyed. My tires were slashed. People came through the State House literally smearing excrement on the walls."

=== Hearings ===
The state Legislature formed a nine-person panel to look into the collapse of RISDIC and, in particular, how certain insiders managed to withdraw hundreds of thousands of dollars just before the announcement of the crisis, exacerbating the problem. The hearings began in July 1991, and were televised. According to The New York Times, the hearings "transfixed the state" and, although the last-minute withdrawals were not themselves the cause of the closures, it gave "Rhode Islanders a focus for their frustration." Among those questioned about their suspiciously timed withdrawals were the Mayor of North Providence, a state senator, credit union executives, RISDIC's former president, the former president's family, and a State Representative who also helped to kill a bill which would have forced credit unions to be federally insured.

Though affected citizens held regular protests and demonstrations from the beginning of the crisis, several noteworthy events occurred in the weeks following the hearings. In August 1991, about 250 angry depositors met outside the Rhode Island Central Credit Union on Jefferson Boulevard in Warwick, demonstrating and obstructing traffic for about two hours. The demonstration turned into a march, moving to occupy an Interstate 95 on-ramp. Seven people were arrested for disorderly conduct, including husband and wife Donald and Raymonde Wolstenholme, recent retirees whose savings were frozen at a credit union in Woonsocket. The Wolstenholmes were profiled by local and national media following their arrest as a symbol of unrest and the crisis' continued effect of regular citizens. Two days later, 200 staged a march from the Statehouse to DEPCO offices. In one event in September 1991, more than 500 chanting protesters gathered at the Statehouse and dumped teabags in front of the Governor's office, symbolizing being on the verge of a revolt by referencing the Boston Tea Party. Another protest occurred the following month, staged in response to an announcement revealing the next phase of the administration's repayment strategy, which focused on a small number of institutions and included financial actions that did not directly repay depositors. Demonstrators hanged an effigy of Sundlun from a lamp post outside the capitol.

According to The New York Times, the banking crisis was the major catalyst in an "ethics movement" or even "citizen revolt" against corruption in Rhode Island. Sundlun, reflecting on the events of 1991, said it was the year when "the dishonesty, greed and corruption that rotted our system was exposed for all to see." Several non-profits and non-governmental organizations formed to advocate for citizens rights, demand accountability, or otherwise fight corruption.

== Resolution ==
In total, 25 of the 36 institutions obtained federal insurance and retained their status as independent banks or credit unions. Two nondepository institutions became inactive. Of the other depository institutions, customers at six were repaid by the end of 1991, six were acquired by other businesses (one by Coventry Credit Union, one by First Bank and Trust, and four by Northeast Savings), and six remained closed with at least some customers still unpaid.

For people waiting to regain access to their funds, progress was slow. At the end of the first year of the crisis, most of the big banks remained closed. Policy measures took incremental steps to pay back small amounts first, including accounts with $2,500 or less, while larger accounts were capped at 10%. Some depositors waited for multiple years to recover their money, although eventually, according to Sundlun, all of it was returned with interest. Though he received criticism at the time from affected depositors and other segments of the public, some of whom called for his impeachment, Sundlun was elected to a second term and continued to stand by his decisions years later. Likewise, Whitehouse said it "without a doubt" could not have gone better.

In total, DEPCO sold $697 million in bonds during its handling of the crisis. It filed about 300 lawsuits in total, targeting the failed institutions as well as other entities which played a role in creating the crisis. A major legal victory came in September 1997, against the financial company Ernst & Young, which served as auditor for RISDIC. The firm had last audited the insurer in February 1990, examining records for 1988 and 1989 without finding significant problems. DEPCO alleged Ernst & Young failed in its role, missing risks that ultimately led to the banking crisis. The firm denied wrongdoing, saying there was no way to predict some of the circumstances, like a downturn in the real estate market, but agreed to pay $103 million, marking what the Wall Street Journal at the time called "one of the largest ever [payments] by an accounting firm to a government agency." The funds were used to continue to pay down DEPCO's large debt. Another large settlement came from Fleet Bank, which paid $15.5 million when it was accused of setting up loans that helped two institutions deceive regulators.

Following the crisis, all Rhode Island banks are now insured by federal entities. DEPCO's debts were settled by August 30, 2000, and it ceased operations in January 2003, in what the Credit Union Journal called "the final chapter in the worst scandal in credit union history." The sales tax increase which was intended to be temporary was never repealed.

== Possible connections to organized crime and corruption ==
Among several other concerns Arlene Violet raised about Heritage Loan & Investment were those about its links to prominent figures in the Patriarca crime family. Police Captain Brian Andrews told The New York Times that the year before the crisis, Mollicone had reported that vandals had entered the bank illegally, but that he would "take care of it myself," citing his connection to Luigi "Baby Shacks" Manocchio, a major figure in the Patriarca network. Manocchio had been seen entering the bank on multiple occasions. Mollicone's father was also the banker of Raymond Patriarca himself, head of organized crime in Rhode Island, who had a headquarters in the same neighborhood as Heritage, although there was not evidence linking Patriarca to Mollicone Jr. directly. In an interview with The New York Times, Lee Blais, former director of investigations for the state Attorney General, said that in 1985 he told then-Governor Edward DiPrete (who, years later, would plead guilty to 18 counts of racketeering, extortion, and bribery unrelated to the bank crisis) about connections between Heritage and organized crime, and gave to him a report detailing problems with RISDIC, but nothing was done.

There had been questions about RISDIC's stability for some time, but nothing was done. According to Jim O'Neil, then the state's attorney general, cronyism, corruption, and connections between RISDIC and politicians were major concerns in the time before RISDIC's collapse: "The paramount problem ... was the inside game and inside people getting loans. They were scratching each others' backs." Audits had not been carried out at Heritage on the schedule required by RISDIC; the insurer did not notify the Attorney General of problems it found at Heritage when it did conduct an audit; Mollicone himself had been vice chairman of RISDIC; Mollicone as well as others at RISDIC were well-connected to politicians; Heritage's board comprised Mollicone's friends and family; board members did not attend regular meetings. When talking about the financial crisis, Attorney General Arlene Violet frequently referenced what she called "the network," which she described as "just like organized crime except for one thing: they make what they do legal."

Throughout the Heritage investigations, law enforcement tried to connect Mollicone and the bank to organized crime. One anonymous official told The New York Times that the bank may have been used to launder money for members of organized crime, obscuring the true identities of the people who owned the money. Among the people's names Mollicone used for the fake loans were members of his family, golfing partners, and Buddy Cianci.

== Mollicone trial and repayment ==
=== Search for Mollicone ===
Joseph Mollicone, Jr.'s name became synonymous with the banking crisis after he set off the chain of events with his theft of between $12 million and $15.2 million from Heritage Loan & Investment. The "state's most wanted fugitive" according to WJAR-TV, law enforcement looked for him for nearly a year and a half without success. There were rumors his alleged Mafia connections led him to Italy, but it was later revealed he had been hiding in Salt Lake City, Utah. After his arrest, Mollicone said there was no reason to choose Utah other than the fact he had briefly traveled there in the past. He took the name of an acquaintance who died just before he fled, John Fazzioli, and according to the Providence Journal "lived under the persona of a Boston jewelry manufacturer who had come to Utah to ski and relax."

In 1992, Mollicone's wife and four children in Rhode Island had their home foreclosed and had to file for bankruptcy. At that point, in April 1992, after nearly 18 months in hiding, he turned himself in. He had met and lived with a girlfriend in Utah who did not know his real identity. In what the state prosecutor found to be a salient demonstration of character, he also left her in debt and on the verge of bankruptcy when he returned to Rhode Island.

=== Trial ===
Rhode Island attorney general Jeff Pine took office in January 1993, just a few months before the trial, inheriting the case from his predecessor. He appointed Kevin Bristow as new lead prosecutor and the trial began in March 1993, after a 60-day continuance. Mollicone admitted to and apologized for his crimes, and his lawyer characterized him as "a sucker." The Superior Court Judge, Dominic Cresto, responded by saying that Mollicone had "considerable talents and persuasive manipulative abilities through the use of charm and guile," and said he had "a conscious, systematic scheme of plundering bank assets entrusted to him."

Witnesses for the prosecution included the former vice president of Heritage Loan & Investment, someone with knowledge of Mollicone's purchase of a Ferrari, Mollicone's girlfriend in Salt Lake City, and another friend from Utah. Although they did not know his true identity, his Utah-based connections testified about his life and lifestyle while on the run. The prosecution also had surveillance footage from the bank.

On April 23, 1993, he was convicted on 26 counts, including embezzlement, bank fraud, and conspiring to create false bank documents. He was sentenced to 30 years in prison and ordered to pay $420,000 in fines and $12 million in restitution. The latter figure was the amount the judge determined had been proven stolen, though it was less than the amount the prosecution alleged. At the time, it was the state's longest sentence for a "white collar" offense.

=== Release and repayment ===
Mollicone was released on parole in 2003, after serving 10 years of his sentence. Upon release, he told a reporter that, with regard to the money he stole, "people who are supposed to know, know it's gone."

Mollicone's parole was satisifed in 2023, but he will remain on probation until 2025. Upon release he was ordered to begin repaying the fines and restitution. Though first drawn from his wages, he then retired, making payments out of his social security income. Another condition of his release was a requirement that he talk about business ethics with students.

In 2009 a judge granted the Internal Revenue Service (IRS) permission to take legal action against Mollicone and to seize any assets he has in order to pay $33 million in taxes and associated penalties and interest from the time he was still working at Heritage Loan & Investment. The IRS has not confirmed whether they have taken those measures.

As of December 2017, the 74-year-old Mollicone was still living in Rhode Island and was working two jobs. Originally ordered to pay $30 per month in restitution, this was later increased to $232 per month after a reconciliation of his income and expenses. Mollicone has voluntarily increased monthly payments to $300 per month, totaling $33,947.50 since his release, a rate at which it would take thousands of years to pay back. In 2020, Mollicone failed to make a payment and requested a reprieve from the courts, citing the COVID-19 epidemic hampered his ability to work.
