= 1984 Rhode Island gubernatorial election =

- November 6, 1984
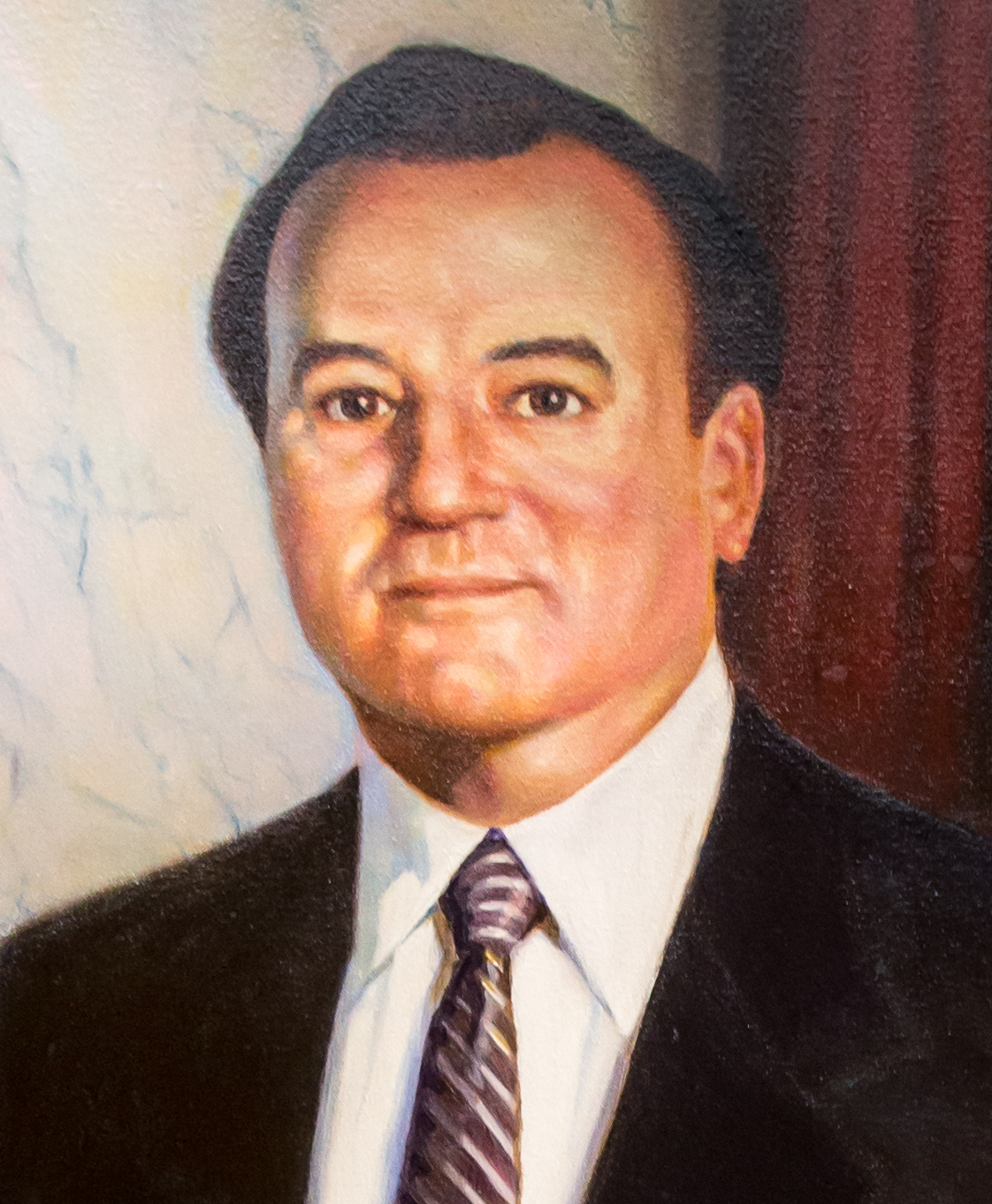

Nominee	Edward D. DiPrete	Anthony J. Solomon
Party	Republican	Democratic
Popular vote	245,059	163,311
Percentage	60.01%	39.99%
- DiPrete: 50–60% 60–70% 70–80% Solomon: 50–60% 60–70%
Governor before election
J. Joseph Garrahy
Democratic
Elected Governor
Edward D. DiPrete
Republican

The 1984 Rhode Island gubernatorial election was held on November 6, 1984. Incumbent Governor J. Joseph Garrahy retired after four terms in office. Republican nominee and Cranston mayor Edward D. DiPrete defeated Democratic nominee Anthony J. Solomon with 60% of the vote.

== Primary elections ==
Primary elections were held on September 11, 1984.

=== Democratic primary ===
==== Candidates ====
- Anthony J. Solomon, Rhode Island State Treasurer
- Joseph W. Walsh

==== Results ====
Democratic primary results
Party	Candidate	Votes	%
Democratic	Anthony J. Solomon	73,090	57.95
Democratic	Joseph W. Walsh	53,041	42.05
Total votes		126,131	100.00

== General election ==
=== Candidates ===
- Edward D. DiPrete, Republican
- Anthony J. Solomon, Democratic

=== Results ===
1984 Rhode Island gubernatorial election
Party	Candidate	Votes	%	±%
Republican	Edward D. DiPrete	245,059	60.01%	
Democratic	Anthony J. Solomon	163,311	39.99%	
Majority		81,748		
Turnout		408,375		
Republican gain from Democratic		Swing		

==== By county ====
	Edward DiPrete Republican		Anthony Solomon Democratic	
County	Votes	%	Votes	%
Bristol	13,292	63.8%	7,540	36.2%
Kent	50,200	69.8%	21,688	30.2%
Newport	21,315	63.2%	12,400	36.8%
Providence	131,469	54.7%	108,761	45.3%
Washington	28,783	69.0%	12,922	31.0%

Counties that flipped from Democratic to Republican

- All 5
