= Michael A. Silverstein =

American judge (born 1933)

Associate Justice Rhode Island Superior Court
- In office 1994–2018
- Appointed by: Governor Bruce G. Sundlun

Personal details
- Born: 1933 (age 92–93) Providence, Rhode Island
- Education: Brown University (A.B. 1956); Boston University School of Law (J.D. 1959)
- Awards: 2010 Chief Justice Joseph R. Weisberger Judicial Excellence Award

Michael A. Silverstein is a retired American judge who served as an associate justice on the Rhode Island Superior Court. He was known for handling significant and complex cases, and for his involvement in creating and heading the Rhode Island Superior Court's Business Calendar, a specialized business court docket within the Superior Court.

== Judicial service ==
In 1994, Rhode Island Governor Bruce G. Sundlun appointed Silverstein as an associate justice to the Rhode Island Superior Court. Throughout his judicial service, Silverstein handled significant and complex cases of various types, notably including lead paint litigation, cases involving financially distressed entities under Rhode Island's receivership law, the 38 Studios suit, the constitutionality of Rhode Island's Lottery Commission, efforts to block the state sale of debt backed by proceeds of the tobacco industry settlement, and many others.

Along with Superior Court Presiding Justice Joseph F. Rogers Jr., Silverstein developed a specialized business court docket within the Superior Court known as the Business Calendar, which became operational on June 4, 2001. The Business Calendar was designed to handle complex litigation focusing on commercial and business disputes. It also handles insolvencies, which is atypical for most business courts. He served as the original Business Calendar judge in 2001, continuing as a Business Calendar judge until his retirement in September 2018, at the age of 85. Upon Silverstein's retirement, Rodgers described him as "'the gold standard by which other judges assigned to that calendar will be measured....'"

Silverstein actively used alternative dispute resolution with his cases, and made the innovative use of non-lawyer professionals as mediators in appropriate circumstances, such as accountants and retired business people. Even after retirement, he was called upon to serve in the roles of judge and special master in important cases of varying types, including among other matters, internal disputes within Rhode Island's House of Representatives, an eminent domain matter against the State of Rhode Island, and the dissolution of a law practice.

== Private law practice ==
Silverstein was admitted to the Rhode Island Bar in 1959, and was a lawyer with various law firms until his judicial appointment in 1994. He was the managing partner of the Rhode Island law firm Hinckley, Allen, Snyder and Comen before joining the Superior Court in 1994. "Throughout his career, Silverstein specialized in dealing with faltering financial institutions". He became an advisor to Sundlun in connection with the 1991 Rhode Island banking crisis, and participated in drafting the legislation that created Rhode Island's Depositors Economic Protection Corporation in response to the crisis.

== Education ==
Silverstein received his undergraduate A. B. degree from Brown University in 1956, and his Juris Doctor degree from the Boston University School of Law in 1959.

== Awards ==
In 2010, Silverstein received the Chief Justice Joseph R. Weisberger Judicial Excellence Award from the Rhode Island Bar. The “award is given to a Rhode Island jurist for exemplifying and encouraging the highest level of competence, integrity, judicial temperament, ethical conduct and professionalism.” In giving the award, the Bar observed that “[t]hrough his vision of justice and fairness, Judge Silverstein adapts new trial technology in response to changes in the legal environment.”

== Organizational involvement ==
He has served as chair of the Woonsocket Industrial Development Corporation, and on the boards of Roger Williams University, the Meeting Street School, the American College of Business Court Judges and his synagogue.
