= 2000 United States state legislative elections =

- November 7, 2000

86 legislative chambers in 44 states
	Majority party	Minority party	Third party
Party	Republican	Democratic	Coalition
Chambers before	48 (Note: The Washington House of Representatives was controlled by a power-sharing agreement between Democrats and Republicans. Thus, it is not counted in this total.) (Note: The New Hampshire Senate became evenly-split due to a special election. Thus, it is not included in the prior total.)	49	0
Chambers after	50	46 (Note: The Maine Senate became evenly split and controlled by a power-sharing agreement between Democrats and Republicans.)	1 (Note: The Arizona Senate was controlled by a coalition of Democrats and Republicans. The minority caucus consists of Republicans who were not part of the majority coalition.)
Overall change	▲2	▼3	▲1
- Map of upper house elections: Democrats gained control Democrats retained control Republicans gained control Republicans retained control Coalition gained control Split body formed Non-partisan legislature No regularly-scheduled elections

- Map of lower house elections: Democrats retained control Republicans gained control Republicans retained control Split body maintained Non-partisan legislature No regularly-scheduled elections

Elections to state legislatures were held on November 7, 2000, simultaneously with the 2000 United States presidential election. Elections were held for 86 legislative chambers in 44 states, simultaneous to those states' gubernatorial elections. Election occurred in both chambers of each state's legislature, except for Alabama, Louisiana, Maryland, Mississippi, New Jersey, and Virginia. Michigan held elections for the lower house. Six territorial chambers in four territories and the District of Columbia were up as well. These elections determined the redistricting process after the 2000 census.

Democrats won control of the Colorado Senate for the first time since 1963. Republicans won control of the Missouri Senate for the first time since 1949, the New Hampshire Senate (which was previously tied), the South Carolina Senate for the first time since 1879 (which also meant they controlled both chambers of the state legislature for the first time since 1877), and the Vermont House of Representatives. Additionally, a coalition government replaced the Republican-controlled Arizona Senate, and the Democratic-controlled Maine Senate became tied.

== Summary table ==
Regularly scheduled elections were held in 86 of the 99 state legislative chambers in the United States. Nationwide, regularly scheduled elections were held for 6,015 of the 7,383 legislative seats. Many legislative chambers held elections for all seats, but some legislative chambers that use staggered elections held elections for only a portion of the total seats in the chamber. The chambers not up for election either hold regularly scheduled elections in odd-numbered years, or have four-year terms and hold all regularly scheduled elections in presidential midterm election years.

Note that this table only covers regularly scheduled elections; additional special elections took place concurrently with these regularly scheduled elections.

State	Upper House				Lower House			
State	Seats up	Total	% up	Term	Seats up	Total	% up	Term
Alaska	19	20	95	4	40	40	100	2
Arizona	30	30	100	2	60	60	100	2
Arkansas	35	35	100	2/4 (Note: The upper houses of Arkansas, Delaware, Florida, Hawaii, Illinois, Minnesota, New Jersey, and Texas use a 2-4-4 term length system.)	100	100	100	2
California	20	40	50	4	80	80	100	2
Colorado	18	35	51	4	65	65	100	2
Connecticut	36	36	100	2	151	151	100	2
Delaware	21	21	100	2/4	41	41	100	2
Florida	40	40	100	2/4	120	120	100	2
Georgia	56	56	100	2	180	180	100	2
Hawaii	25	25	100	2/4	51	51	100	2
Idaho	35	35	100	2	70	70	100	2
Illinois	59	59	100	2/4	118	118	100	2
Indiana	25	50	50	4	100	100	100	2
Iowa	25	50	50	4	100	100	100	2
Kansas	40	40	100	4	125	125	100	2
Kentucky	19	38	50	4	100	100	100	2
Louisiana	0	39	0	4	0	105	0	4
Maine	35	35	100	2	151	151	100	2
Maryland	0	47	0	4	0	141	0	4
Massachusetts	40	40	100	2	160	160	100	2
Michigan	0	38	0	4	110	110	100	2
Minnesota	67	67	100	2/4	134	134	100	2
Mississippi	0	52	0	4	0	122	0	4
Missouri	17	34	50	4	163	163	100	2
Montana	25	50	50	4	100	100	100	2
Nebraska	25 (Note: These figures represent the seats of Nebraska's unicameral legislature.)	49	51	4	N/A (unicameral)			
Nevada	10	21	48	4	42	42	100	2
New Hampshire	24	24	100	2	400	400	100	2
New Jersey	0	40	0	2/4	0	80	0	2
New Mexico	42	42	100	4	70	70	100	2
New York	62	62	100	2	150	150	100	2
North Carolina	50	50	100	2	120	120	100	2
North Dakota	23	47	49	4	47	94	50	4
Ohio	16	33	48	4	99	99	100	2
Oklahoma	24	48	50	4	101	101	100	2
Oregon	15	30	50	4	60	60	100	2
Pennsylvania	25	50	50	4	203	203	100	2
Rhode Island	38	38	100	2	75	75	100	2
South Carolina	46	46	100	4	124	124	100	2
South Dakota	35	35	100	2	70	70	100	2
Tennessee	16	33	48	4	99	99	100	2
Texas	16	31	52	2/4	150	150	100	2
Utah	15	29	52	4	75	75	100	2
Vermont	30	30	100	2	150	150	100	2
Virginia	0	40	0	4	0	100	0	2
Washington	25	49	51	4	98	98	100	2
West Virginia	17	34	50	4	100	100	100	2
Wisconsin	16	33	48	4	99	99	100	2
Wyoming	15	30	50	4	60	60	100	2
Total	1280	1971	65	N/A	4595	5411	85	N/A

== Maps ==
Upper house seats by party holding majority in each state
Republican 50–60% 60–70% 70–80% 90–100%	Democratic 50–60% 60–70% 70–80% 80–90%	Tie 40–50% 50%

Lower house seats by party holding majority in each state
Republican 50–60% 60–70% 70–80% 80–90%	Democratic 50–60% 60–70% 70–80% 80–90%	Tie 50%

Net changes to upper house seats after the 2000 elections
+1 Rep seat +2 Rep seats +3–4 Rep seats
+1 Dem seat +2 Dem seats +4 Dem seats

Net changes to lower house seats after the 2000 elections
+1 Rep seat +2 Rep seats +3–5 Rep seats
+7–11 Rep seats +17 Rep seats
+1 Dem seat +2 Dem seats +4–5 Dem seats +6–9 Dem seats

== State summaries ==
=== Alaska ===
All of the seats of the Alaska House of Representatives and half of the Alaska Senate were up for election. Republicans maintained control of both chambers.

Alaska Senate
Party	Before	After	Change
Republican	15	14	▼1
Democratic	5	6	▲1
Total	20	20	

Alaska House of Representatives
Party	Before	After	Change
Republican	26	27	▲1
Democratic	14	13	▼1
Total	40	40	

=== Arizona ===
All of the seats of the Arizona Legislature were up for election. Republicans maintained control of the House of Representatives and the Senate was replaced by a Republican-led coalition.

Arizona Senate
Party	Before	After	Change
Republican	16	12	▼1
Republican	16	3	▼1
Democratic	14	15	▲1
Total	30	30	

Arizona House of Representatives
Party	Before	After	Change
Republican	40	36	▼4
Democratic	20	24	▲4
Total	60	60	

=== Arkansas ===
All of the seats of the Arkansas House of Representatives and half of the Arkansas Senate were up for election. Democrats maintained control of both state legislative chambers.

Arkansas Senate
Party	Before	After	Change
Democratic	30	27	▼3
Republican	5	8	▲3
Total	35	35	

Arkansas House of Representatives
Party	Before	After	Change
Democratic	76	72	▼4
Republican	24	28	▲4
Total	100	100	

=== California ===
All of the seats of the California House of Representatives and half of the California Senate were up for election. Democrats maintained control of both state legislative chambers.

California State Senate
Party	Before	After	Change
Democratic	25	26	▲1
Republican	15	14	▼1
Total	40	40	

California State Assembly
Party	Before	After	Change
Democratic	47	50	▲3
Republican	32	30	▼2
Total	80	80	

=== Colorado ===
All of the seats of the Colorado House of Representatives and half of the Colorado Senate were up for election. Republicans held control of the House of Representatives, while Democrats won control of the Senate.

Colorado Senate
Party	Before	After	Change
Republican	21	17	▼4
Democratic	14	18	▲4
Total	35	35	

Colorado House of Representatives
Party	Before	After	Change
Republican	39	38	▼1
Democratic	26	27	▲1
Total	65	65	

=== Connecticut ===
All of the seats of the Connecticut Legislature were up for election. Democrats maintained control of both state legislative chambers.

Connecticut State Senate
Party	Before	After	Change
Democratic	19	21	▲2
Republican	17	15	▼2
Total	36	36	

Connecticut House of Representatives
Party	Before	After	Change
Democratic	96	100	▲4
Republican	55	51	▼4
Total	151	151	

=== Delaware ===
All of the seats of the Delaware House of Representatives and half of the Delaware Senate were up for election. Democrats maintained control of the Senate while Republicans maintained control of the House.

Delaware Senate
Party	Before	After	Change
Democratic	13	13	Steady
Republican	8	8	Steady
Total	21	21	

Delaware House of Representatives
Party	Before	After	Change
Republican	26	26	Steady
Democratic	15	15	Steady
Total	41	41	

=== Florida ===
All of the seats of the Florida House of Representatives and half of the Florida Senate were up for election. Republicans maintained control of both state legislative chambers.

Florida Senate
Party	Before	After	Change
Republican	25	25	Steady
Democratic	15	15	Steady
Total	40	40	

Florida House of Representatives
Party	Before	After	Change
Republican	75	77	▲2
Democratic	45	43	▼2
Total	120	120	

=== Georgia ===
All of the seats of the Georgia Legislature were up for election. Democrats maintained control of both chambers.

Georgia State Senate
Party	Before	After	Change
Democratic	34	32	▼2
Republican	22	24	▲2
Total	56	56	

Georgia House of Representatives
Party	Before	After	Change
Democratic	102	105	▲3
Republican	78	74	▼4
Independent	0	1	▲1
Total	180	180	

=== Hawaii ===
All of the seats of the Hawaii House of Representatives and half of the Hawaii Senate were up for election. Democrats maintained control of both state legislative chambers.

Hawaii Senate
Party	Before	After	Change
Democratic	23	22	▼1
Republican	2	3	▲1
Total	25	25	

Hawaii House of Representatives
Party	Before	After	Change
Democratic	39	32	▼7
Republican	12	19	▲7
Total	51	51	

=== Idaho ===
All of the seats of the Idaho Legislature were up for election. Republicans maintained control of both state legislative chambers.

Idaho Senate
Party	Before	After	Change
Republican	31	32	▲1
Democratic	4	3	▼1
Total	35	35	

Idaho House of Representatives
Party	Before	After	Change
Republican	58	61	▲3
Democratic	12	9	▼3
Total	70	70	

=== Illinois ===
All of the seats of the Illinois House of Representatives and 2/3rds of the Illinois Senate were up for election. Democrats maintained control of the House of Representatives and Republicans maintained control of the Senate.

Illinois Senate
Party	Before	After	Change
Republican	32	32	Steady
Democratic	27	27	Steady
Total	59	59	

Illinois House of Representatives
Party	Before	After	Change
Democratic	62	62	Steady
Republican	56	56	Steady
Total	118	118	

=== Indiana ===
All of the seats of the Indiana House of Representatives and half of the Indiana Senate were up for election. Republicans maintained control of the Senate and Democrats maintained control of the House of Representatives.

Indiana Senate
Party	Before	After	Change
Republican	31	32	▲1
Democratic	19	18	▼1
Total	50	50	

Indiana House of Representatives
Party	Before	After	Change
Democratic	53	53	Steady
Republican	47	47	Steady
Total	100	100	

=== Iowa ===
All of the seats of the Iowa House of Representatives and half of the Iowa Senate were up for election. Republicans maintained control of both chambers.

Iowa Senate
Party	Before	After	Change
Republican	30	30	Steady
Democratic	20	20	Steady
Total	50	50	

Iowa House of Representatives
Party	Before	After	Change
Republican	56	56	Steady
Democratic	44	44	Steady
Total	100	100	

=== Kansas ===
All of the seats of the Kansas Senate and Kansas House of Representatives were up for election. Republicans maintained control of both chambers.

Kansas Senate
Party	Before	After	Change
Republican	27	30	▲3
Democratic	13	10	▼3
Total	40	40	

Kansas House of Representatives
Party	Before	After	Change
Republican	77	79	▲2
Democratic	48	46	▼2
Total	125	125	

=== Kentucky ===
All of the seats of the Kentucky House of Representatives and half of the Kentucky Senate were up for election. Republicans maintained control of the Senate and Democrats maintained control of the House of Representatives.

Kentucky Senate
Party	Before	After	Change
Republican	20	20	Steady
Democratic	18	18	Steady
Total	38	38	Steady

Kentucky House of Representatives
Party	Before	After	Change
Democratic	66	64	▼2
Republican	34	36	▲2
Total	100	100	

=== Maine ===
All of the seats of the Maine Legislature were up for election. Democrats maintained control of the House of Representatives, while the Senate became tied.

Maine Senate
Party	Before	After	Change
Democratic	20	17	▼3
Republican	14	17	▲3
Independent	1	1	Steady
Total	35	35	

Maine House of Representatives
Party	Before	After	Change
Democratic	79	88	▲9
Republican	71	62	▼9
Independent	1	1	Steady
Total	151	151	

=== Massachusetts ===
All of the seats of the Massachusetts Legislature were up for election. Democrats maintained control of both state legislative chambers.

Massachusetts Senate
Party	Before	After	Change
Democratic	33	34	▲1
Republican	7	6	▼1
Total	40	40	

Massachusetts House of Representatives
Party	Before	After	Change
Democratic	131	137	▲6
Republican	28	23	▼5
Independent	1	0	▼1
Total	160	160	

=== Michigan ===
All of the seats of the Michigan House of Representatives were up for election. Republicans maintained control of the House.

Michigan House of Representatives
Party	Before	After	Change
Republican	58	58	Steady
Democratic	52	52	Steady
Total	110	110	

=== Minnesota ===
All of the seats of the Minnesota House of Representatives and Minnesota Senate were up. Republicans maintained control of the House and Democrats maintained control of the Senate.

Minnesota Senate
Party	Before	After	Change
Democratic (DFL)	40	39	▼1
Republican	26	27	▲1
Independent	1	1	Steady
Total	67	67	

Minnesota House of Representatives
Party	Before	After	Change
Republican	70	69	▼1
Democratic (DFL)	63	65	▲2
Independence	1	0	▼1
Total	134	134	

=== Missouri ===
All of the seats of the Missouri House of Representatives and half of the Missouri Senate were up for election. Republicans won control of the Senate, and Democrats maintained control of the House of Representatives.

Missouri Senate
Party	Before	After	Change
Republican	16	18	▲2
Democratic	18	16	▼2
Total	34	34	

Missouri House of Representatives
Party	Before	After	Change
Democratic	85	87	▲2
Republican	78	76	▼2
Total	163	163	

=== Montana ===
All of the seats of the Montana House of Representatives and half of the Montana Senate were up for election. Republicans held control of both chambers.

Montana Senate
Party	Before	After	Change
Republican	32	31	▼1
Democratic	18	19	▲1
Total	50	50	

Montana House of Representatives
Party	Before	After	Change
Republican	59	58	▼1
Democratic	41	42	▲1
Total	100	100	

=== Nebraska ===
Nebraska is the only U.S. state with a unicameral legislature; half of the seats of the Nebraska Legislature were up for election. Nebraska is also unique in that its legislature is officially non-partisan and holds non-partisan elections, although the Democratic and Republican parties each endorse legislative candidates. Republicans maintained control.

Nebraska Legislature
Party	Before	After	Change
Republican	29	31	▲2
Democratic	18	16	▼2
Independent	2	2	Steady
Total	49	49	

=== Nevada ===
All of the seats of the Nevada House of Representatives and half of the Nevada Senate were up for election. Democrats maintained control of the House, while Republicans maintained control of the Senate.

Nevada Senate
Party	Before	After	Change
Republican	12	12	Steady
Democratic	9	9	Steady
Total	21	21	

Nevada Assembly
Party	Before	After	Change
Democratic	28	27	▼1
Republican	14	15	▲1
Total	42	42	

=== New Hampshire ===
All of the seats of the New Hampshire House of Representatives and the New Hampshire Senate were up for election. Republicans maintained control of the House of Representatives, and flipped control of the Senate from a tie.

New Hampshire Senate
Party	Before	After	Change
Republican	12	13	▲1
Democratic	12	11	▼1
Total	24	24	

New Hampshire House of Representatives
Party	Before	After	Change
Republican	245	256	▲11
Democratic	155	144	▼11
Total	400	400	

=== New Mexico ===
All of the seats of the New Mexico Legislature were up for election; Democrats maintained control of both chambers.

New Mexico Senate
Party	Before	After	Change
Democratic	25	24	▼1
Republican	17	18	▲1
Total	42	42	

New Mexico House of Representatives
Party	Before	After	Change
Democratic	40	42	▲2
Republican	30	28	▼2
Total	70	70	

=== New York ===
All of the seats of the New York Legislature were up for election. Republicans maintained control of the Senate, while Democrats maintained control of the Assembly.

New York State Senate
Party	Before	After	Change
Republican	35	36	▲1
Democratic	26	25	▼1
Total	61	61	

New York State Assembly
Party	Before	After	Change
Democratic	98	98	Steady
Republican	52	52	Steady
Total	150	150	

=== North Carolina ===
All of the seats of the North Carolina House of Representatives and half of the North Carolina Senate were up for election. Democrats maintained control of both chambers.

North Carolina Senate
Party	Before	After	Change
Democratic	35	35	Steady
Republican	15	15	Steady
Total	50	50	

North Carolina House of Representatives
Party	Before	After	Change
Democratic	66	62	▼4
Republican	54	58	▲4
Total	120	120	

=== North Dakota ===
All of the seats of the North Dakota House of Representatives and half of the North Dakota Senate were up for election. Republicans maintained control of both state legislative chambers.

North Dakota Senate
Party	Before	After	Change
Republican	31	32	▲1
Democratic-NPL	18	17	▼1
Total	49	49	

North Dakota House of Representatives
Party	Before	After	Change
Republican	64	69	▲5
Democratic-NPL	34	29	▼5
Total	98	98	

=== Ohio ===
All of the seats of the Ohio House of Representatives and half of the Ohio Senate were up for election. Republicans maintained control of both chambers.

Ohio Senate
Party	Before	After	Change
Republican	21	21	Steady
Democratic	12	12	Steady
Total	33	33	

Ohio House of Representatives
Party	Before	After	Change
Republican	59	60	▲1
Democratic	40	39	▼1
Total	99	99	

=== Oklahoma ===
All of the seats of the Oklahoma House of Representatives and half of the Oklahoma Senate were up for election. Democrats maintained control of both chambers.

Oklahoma Senate
Party	Before	After	Change
Democratic	33	30	▼3
Republican	15	18	▲3
Total	48	48	

Oklahoma House of Representatives
Party	Before	After	Change
Democratic	61	53	▼8
Republican	40	48	▲8
Total	101	101	

=== Oregon ===
All of the seats of the Oregon House of Representatives and half of the Oregon Senate were up for election. Republicans maintained control of both chambers.

Oregon State Senate
Party	Before	After	Change
Republican	17	16	▼1
Democratic	13	14	▲1
Total	30	30	

Oregon House of Representatives
Party	Before	After	Change
Republican	34	32	▼2
Democratic	25	27	▲2
Independent	1	1	Steady
Total	60	60	

=== Pennsylvania ===
All of the seats of the Pennsylvania House of Representatives and half of the Pennsylvania Senate were up for election. Republicans maintained control of both chambers.

Pennsylvania State Senate
Party	Before	After	Change
Republican	30	30	Steady
Democratic	20	20	Steady
Total	50	50	

Pennsylvania House of Representatives
Party	Before	After	Change
Republican	102	104	▲2
Democratic	101	99	▼2
Total	203	203	

=== Rhode Island ===
All of the seats of the Rhode Island Legislature were up for election. Democrats maintained control of both state legislative chambers.

Rhode Island Senate
Party	Before	After	Change
Democratic	42	44	▲2
Republican	8	6	▼2
Total	50	50	

Rhode Island House of Representatives
Party	Before	After	Change
Democratic	86	85	▼1
Republican	13	15	▲2
Independent	1	0	▼1
Total	100	100	

=== South Carolina ===
All of the seats of the South Carolina Legislature were up for election. Republicans maintained control of the House of Representatives, and won control of the Senate.

South Carolina Senate
Party	Before	After	Change
Republican	21	25	▲4
Democratic	25	21	▼4
Total	46	46	

South Carolina House of Representatives
Party	Before	After	Change
Republican	67	71	▲4
Democratic	57	53	▼4
Total	124	124	

=== South Dakota ===
All of the seats of the South Dakota Legislature were up for election. Republicans maintained control of both state legislative chambers.

South Dakota Senate
Party	Before	After	Change
Republican	22	24	▲2
Democratic	13	11	▼2
Total	35	35	

South Dakota House of Representatives
Party	Before	After	Change
Republican	52	50	▼2
Democratic	18	20	▲2
Total	70	70	

=== Tennessee ===
All of the seats of the Tennessee House of Representatives and half of the Tennessee Senate were up for election. Democrats maintained control of both chambers.

Tennessee Senate
Party	Before	After	Change
Democratic	18	18	Steady
Republican	15	15	Steady
Total	33	33	

Tennessee House of Representatives
Party	Before	After	Change
Democratic	59	58	▼1
Republican	40	41	▲1
Total	99	99	

=== Texas ===
All of the seats of the Texas House of Representatives and half of the Texas Senate were up for election. Republicans maintained control of the Senate, while Democrats maintained control of the House of Representatives.

Texas Senate
Party	Before	After	Change
Republican	16	16	Steady
Democratic	15	15	Steady
Total	31	31	

Texas House of Representatives
Party	Before	After	Change
Democratic	78	78	Steady
Republican	72	72	Steady
Total	150	150	

=== Utah ===
All of the seats of the Utah House of Representatives and half of the Utah Senate were up for election. Republicans maintained control of both state legislative chambers.

Utah State Senate
Party	Before	After	Change
Republican	18	20	▲2
Democratic	11	9	▼2
Total	29	29	

Utah House of Representatives
Party	Before	After	Change
Republican	54	51	▼3
Democratic	21	24	▲3
Total	75	75	

=== Vermont ===
All of the seats of the Vermont Legislature were up for election. Democrats maintained control of the Senate and Republicans won control of the House.

Vermont Senate
Party	Before	After	Change
Democratic	17	16	▼1
Republican	13	14	▲1
Total	30	30	

Vermont House of Representatives
Party	Before	After	Change
Republican	66	83	▲17
Democratic	77	62	▼15
Progressive	4	4	Steady
Independent	3	1	▼2
Total	150	150	

=== Washington ===
All of the seats of the Washington House of Representatives and half of the Washington Senate were up for election. Democrats maintained control of the Senate, while a split body was maintained in the House.

Washington State Senate
Party	Before	After	Change
Democratic	26	25	▼1
Republican	23	24	▲1
Total	49	49	

Washington House of Representatives
Party	Before	After	Change
Democratic	49	49	Steady
Republican	49	49	Steady
Total	98	98	

=== West Virginia ===
All of the seats of the West Virginia House of Delegates and half of the West Virginia Senate were up for election. Democrats maintained control of both state legislative chambers.

West Virginia Senate
Party	Before	After	Change
Democratic	29	28	▼1
Republican	5	6	▲1
Total	34	34	

West Virginia House of Delegates
Party	Before	After	Change
Democratic	75	75	Steady
Republican	25	25	Steady
Total	100	100	

=== Wisconsin ===
All of the seats of the Wisconsin Assembly and half of the Wisconsin Senate were up for election. Republicans maintained control of the General Assembly and Democrats maintained control of the Senate.

Wisconsin Senate
Party	Before	After	Change
Democratic	17	18	▲1
Republican	16	15	▼1
Total	33	33	

Wisconsin State Assembly
Party	Before	After	Change
Republican	55	56	▲1
Democratic	44	43	▼1
Total	99	99	

=== Wyoming ===
All of the seats of the Wyoming House of Representatives and half of the Wyoming Senate were up for election. Republicans maintained control of both state legislative chambers.

Wyoming Senate
Party	Before	After	Change
Republican	21	20	▼1
Democratic	9	10	▲1
Total	30	30	

Wyoming House of Representatives
Party	Before	After	Change
Republican	43	46	▲3
Democratic	17	14	▼3
Total	60	60	

== Territorial and federal district summaries ==
=== American Samoa ===
All of the seats of the American Samoa Senate and the American Samoa House of Representatives were up for election. Members of the Senate serve four-year terms, while members of the House of Representatives serve two-year terms. Gubernatorial and legislative elections are conducted on a nonpartisan basis in American Samoa.

=== Guam ===
All of the seats of the unicameral Legislature of Guam were up for election. All members of the legislature serve a two-year term. Republicans maintained control of the legislature.

Guam Legislature
Party	Before	After	Change
Republican	10	8	▼2
Democratic	5	7	▲2
Total	15	15	

=== Puerto Rico ===
All of the seats of the Senate of Puerto Rico and the House of Representatives of Puerto Rico are up for election. Members of the Senate and the House of Representatives both serve four-year terms. The Popular Democratic Party won control of both chambers.

Puerto Rico Senate
Party	Before	After	Change
Popular Democratic	8	19	▲11
New Progressive	19	8	▼11
Puerto Rican Independence	1	1	Steady
Total	28	28	

Puerto Rico House of Representatives
Party	Before	After	Change
Popular Democratic	16	29	▲13
New Progressive	37	21	▼16
Puerto Rican Independence	1	1	Steady
Total	54	51	

=== Washington, D.C. ===
The Council of the District of Columbia serves as the legislative branch of the federal district of Washington, D.C. Half of the council seats are up for election. Council members serve four-year terms. Democrats retained supermajority control of the council.

District of Columbia Council
Party	Before	After	Change
Democratic	11	11	Steady
Republican	2	2	Steady
Total	13	13	
