= 1980 Rhode Island gubernatorial election =

- November 4, 1980
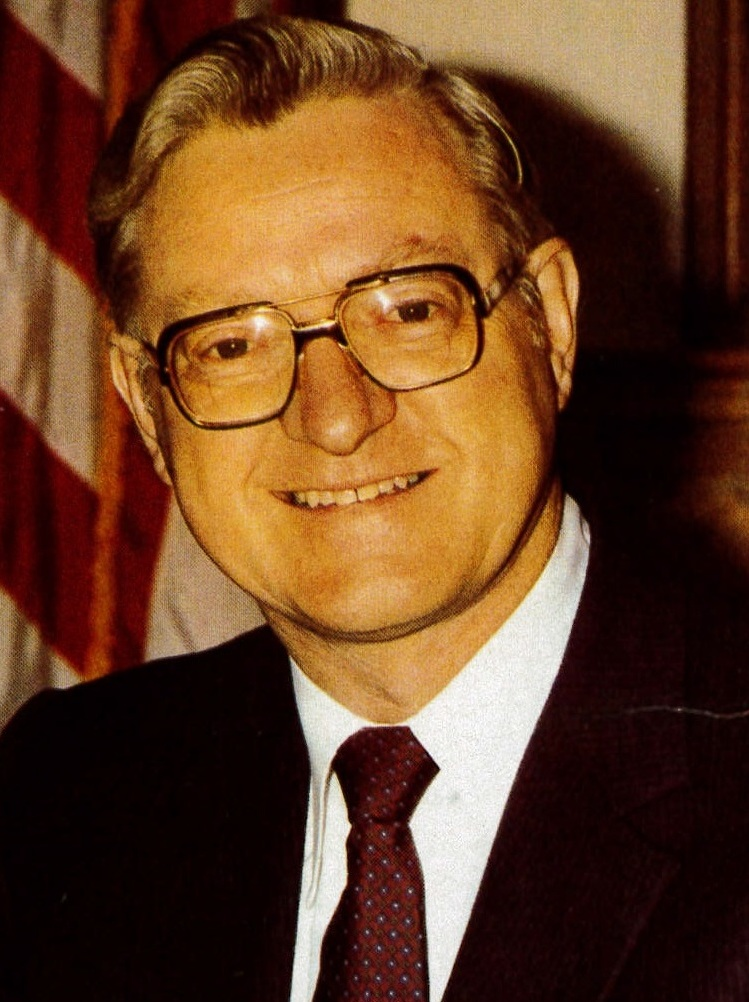

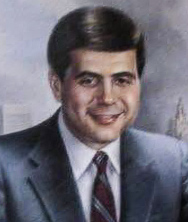
Nominee	J. Joseph Garrahy	Buddy Cianci
Party	Democratic	Republican
Popular vote	299,174	106,729
Percentage	73.71%	26.29%
- Garrahy: 60–70% 70–80% 80–90%
Governor before election
J. Joseph Garrahy
Democratic
Elected Governor
J. Joseph Garrahy
Democratic

The 1980 Rhode Island gubernatorial election was held on November 4, 1980. Incumbent Democrat J. Joseph Garrahy defeated Republican nominee Buddy Cianci with 73.71% of the vote despite the fact that Jimmy Carter carried the state by a much smaller margin in the concurrent presidential election.

== General election ==
=== Candidates ===
- J. Joseph Garrahy - Governor of Rhode Island (Democratic)
- Buddy Cianci - Mayor of Providence (Republican)

=== Results ===
1980 Rhode Island gubernatorial election
Party	Candidate	Votes	%	±%
Democratic	J. Joseph Garrahy (incumbent)	299,174	73.71%	
Republican	Buddy Cianci	106,729	26.29%	
Majority		192,445		
Turnout		405,916		
Democratic hold		Swing		

==== By county ====
	Joseph Garrahy Democratic		Buddy Cianci Republican	
County	Votes	%	Votes	%
Bristol	15,260	72.2%	5,881	27.8%
Kent	53,492	76.3%	16,606	23.7%
Newport	25,536	76.8%	7,633	23.2%
Providence	175,635	72.5%	66,571	27.5%
Washington	29,451	74.6%	10,038	25.4%
