= Bruce Sundlun =

American politician (1920–2011)

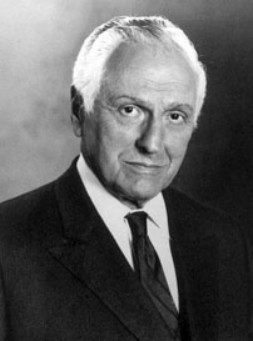

71st Governor of Rhode Island
- In office January 1, 1991 – January 3, 1995
- Lieutenant: Roger N. Begin; Robert Weygand
- Preceded by: Edward D. DiPrete
- Succeeded by: Lincoln Almond

Personal details
- Born: Bruce George Sundlun; January 19, 1920 Providence, Rhode Island, U.S.
- Died: July 21, 2011 (aged 91) Jamestown, Rhode Island, U.S.
- Party: Democratic
- Spouses: Madeleine Eisner Schiffer Gimbel (m. 1949; div. 1965) Pamela Soldwedel Barrett (m. 1966; div. 1974) Joyanne Thomas Carter (m. 1974; div. 1985) Marjorie Lee (m. 1985; div. 1999) Susan Dittelman (m. 2000)
- Education: Williams College (BA); Harvard University (LLB)
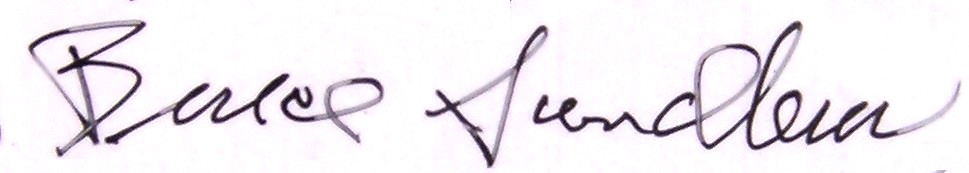
- Signature

Military service
- Branch/service: United States Army Air Forces (1942–1947); United States Air Force (1947–1980)
- Years of service: 1942–1945 (active); 1945–1980 (reserves)
- Rank: Captain (active); Colonel (Air Force Reserves)
- Unit: Eighth Air Force; Grafton Underwood; 384th Bomb Group; 545th Squadron
- Commands: B-17F Damn Yankee
- Battles/wars: World War II; Combined Bomber Offensive
- Awards: Distinguished Flying Cross; Purple Heart; Air Medal with two oak leaf clusters Military Order of Foreign Wars; Chevalier of the Légion d'honneur
- Portrait in Rhode Island Statehouse

Bruce George Sundlun (January 19, 1920 – July 21, 2011) was an American businessman, politician and member of the Democratic Party who served as 71st governor of Rhode Island between 1991 and 1995.

He was Rhode Island's second Jewish governor, and the only Jewish governor in the United States during his tenure. In addition to politics, Sundlun had a varied career as a military pilot, federal attorney, practicing lawyer, corporate executive and university lecturer.

== Early life and education ==
Sundlun was born in Providence on January 19, 1920, to Walter Irving Sundlun and Jennette "Jan" Zelda (née Colitz) Sundlun. His grandparents were Lithuanian Jewish immigrants.

Sundlun attended the Gordon School, Classical High School (Providence) and the Tabor Academy (Marion, Massachusetts). In 1933, while attending Boy Scout camp at Camp Yawgoog, he fell through ice on a pond and was rescued by a young John Chafee; and while in high school, he was a track star and excelled in long jump events.

Upon finishing college classes begun in 1938, he received a B.A. from Williams College in 1946 after serving during World War II in the United States Army Air Forces flying B-17 bombers in the 8th Air Force in England. He attended Harvard Law School, graduating with an LL.B. in 1949.

== Military service ==
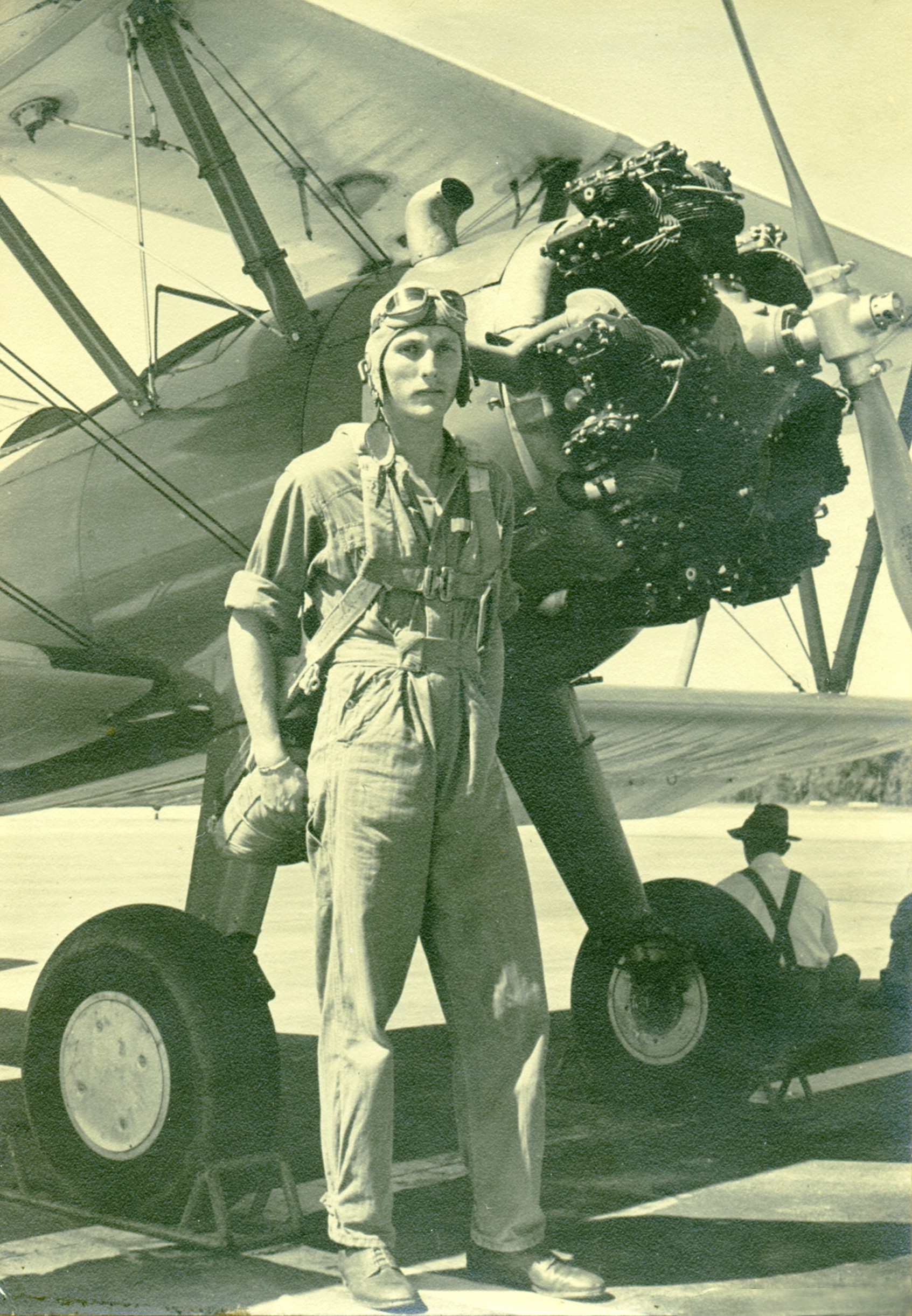
U.S. Army Air Corps Aviation Cadet Bruce Sundlun at Orangeburg Army Airfield, South Carolina in early 1942 alongside his Boeing-Stearman PT-17 Flight Trainer

While still in college, Sundlun volunteered for service in the U.S. Army Air Forces Aviation Cadet Program on December 8, 1941, at Westover Field. He was trained as a four-engine bomber pilot at Maxwell Field in Alabama, after basic flight training at the USAAC Southeast Training Center at Orangeburg, South Carolina, the Greenville Army Air Field at Greenville, Mississippi, and George Field in Lawrenceville, Illinois.

During overseas active duty beginning in June 1943, Sundlun served as a B-17 Flying Fortress pilot in the England-based 545th Bombardment Squadron, 384th Bomb Group of the Eighth Air Force at Grafton-Underwood Air Base. On December 1, 1943, during his 13th bombing mission, his plane the Damn Yankee was damaged by flak during the bombing of Solingen, Germany, knocking out one of the engines and jamming the bomb bay doors in an open position.

On the slowed return trip to England, the damaged Damn Yankee was intercepted by a squadron of Focke-Wulf Fw 190 fighters while over Nazi-occupied Jabbeke, Belgium, and they inflicted further damage to the plane causing its crash. Sundlun was able to bank the airplane hard to the left before bailing out, to avoid crashing into the town center. Moments later the plane crashed into a turnip field at Zomerweg 41 51.16878°N 3.0989°E, south of Jabbeke. A monument commemorating the crash was erected on the side of the road near the crash site by the citizens of Jabbeke in 2009 and he was named an honorary citizen because his action saved countless lives in the town center of Jabbeke. Of the ten-man crew, five were killed while in the plane, four were quickly captured by German forces on the ground, with Sundlun the only crew member able to evade capture.

Four of ten crew members of B-17F Damn Yankee. L-R. Top turret gunner, Sgt. William Ramsey; waist gunner, Sgt. Michael J. Cappelletti; bombardier, Sgt. George Hayes; and pilot, Lt. Bruce Sundlun in October 1943

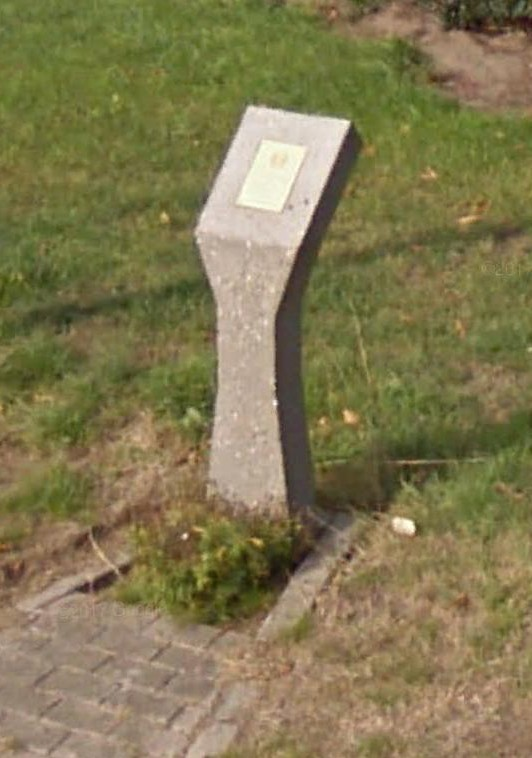
Roadside marker near 41 Zomerweg Jabbeke, Belgium commemorating the crash of USAAF B-17 Damn Yankee on December 1, 1943

Sundlun made his way across Belgium and France by stealing bicycles in the morning near the market centers of small towns and seeking aid from local Catholic priests in the evening.

After six months time cooperating with the French Resistance under the code name Salamander, he made several attempts to enter Spain near Biarritz, and later near Foix. But after deciding that there was too much danger of capture or loss in the snowy Pyrenees, he made his way on stolen bicycles north-eastward across France and escaped into Switzerland on May 5, 1944, near Fêche-l'Église. Before escaping into Switzerland, he was engaged with the Maquis in acts of sabotage near Belfort against German Army units under the command of Russian defector General Andrey Vlasov.

Once Sundlun entered Switzerland he turned himself in to Swiss authorities and was interned along with other Allied military officers at a hotel in Davos. Within a few months after it was learned about his ability to travel in France undetected, Sundlun was recruited by Allen Dulles to work out of the U.S. Embassy in Bern under the auspices of the Office of Strategic Services in the early preparations for Operation Sunrise. Later under the orders of Dulles, he reentered France to act as a bombardment spotter for the Allied invasion of Marseille in mid-August 1944. After a brief service as a pilot of C-54 Skymaster cargo planes into Karachi, and over "The Hump" to Kunming after VE Day, he ferried bombers (B-24 Liberators and B-29 Superfortresses) from the U.S. mainland to Tinian in the Mariana Islands and into other bases in the Pacific Theater of Operations.

In August 1945, Sundlun attained the rank of captain, and left active service at the end of the war. He received the Purple Heart, Distinguished Flying Cross, and Air Medal with two oak leaf clusters from the U.S. military, and in 1977 he received the Chevalier of the Légion d'honneur from the French government.

Despite ending his active service in 1945, he remained in the U.S. Air Force Reserve and rose through the officer ranks until he retired as a colonel in 1980 after serving with the 376th Troop Carrier Squadron at Hanscom Air Force Base in Massachusetts, and the 459th Troop Carrier Group, Medium at Andrews Air Force Base in Maryland He was a member of the Rhode Island Commandery of the Military Order of Foreign Wars, a military society of commissioned officers who served during wartime and their descendants.

In September 1948 Sundlun flew surplus B-17 bombers from Davis-Monthan Air Force Base in Arizona to the newly created state of Israel to help form the Israeli Air Force. Years later, on November 27, 1979, he was awarded the Prime Minister's Medal by Israeli Prime Minister Menachem Begin for his services to the State of Israel.

=== Military awards and decorations ===

USAAF Command pilot
Distinguished Flying Cross	Purple Heart	Air Medal with 2 Oak leaf clusters
American Campaign Medal	European-African-Middle Eastern Campaign Medal	Asiatic-Pacific Campaign Medal
World War II Victory Medal	Armed Forces Reserve Medal with gold hourglass device	Chevalier of the Légion d'honneur (France)

== Legal and business career ==
From 1949 to 1972, Sundlun was a practicing attorney. In 1949, he was appointed by Attorney General J. Howard McGrath to serve as an Assistant United States Attorney in Washington, D.C., and later served as a Special Assistant to the U.S. Attorney General. From 1954 to 1972, he was in private law practice in both Washington, D.C. and Providence, with the law firms of Amram, Hahn, and Sundlun and Sundlun, Tirana and Scher.

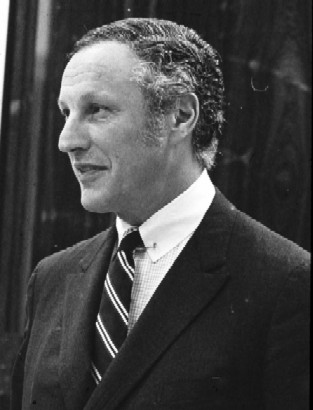
Bruce Sundlun, Founding Director of COMSAT, 1962

Sundlun was active as a businessman from the 1960s through the 1990s. He was a pioneer in the jet charter industry in 1964 by being one of the founding members on the board of directors of Executive Jet Aviation (EJA), along with Air Force generals Curtis E. LeMay and Paul Tibbetts, and entertainers James Stewart and Arthur Godfrey, with retired Air Force Brigadier General Olbert F. "Dick" Lassiter as president and chairman of the board. Shortly after incorporation in Ohio, Sundlun arranged financing for EJA by engineering a stock purchase by American Contract Company of Wilmington, Delaware, a wholly owned subsidiary of the Pennsylvania Railroad. EJA initially began operations in 1964 with a fleet of ten Learjet 23 aircraft.

Several years later, a number of financial and legal improprieties were made by Lassiter including the purchase of Boeing 707 and Boeing 727 aircraft in violation of federal law prohibiting railroad ownership of large aircraft. An order by the Civil Aeronautics Board for EJA to either dispose of the large airplanes or for the Penn Central Railroad to divest its $22 million investment led to the near collapse of EJA in 1970. The company's creditors reacted by demanding the removal of Lassiter as president.

On July 2, 1970, Sundlun was installed as EJA president, and he set out to rebuild the company. Under his leadership, the big jets were sold and he brought the company into the black. In the process, Sundlun, Robert Lee Scott Jr. and Joseph Samuels "Dody" Sinclair, grandson of one of the founders of The Outlet Company of Providence, borrowed $1.25 million from the Industrial Trust Company of Providence to buy out Penn Central's interest in EJA. That purchase was completed in 1972 as part of the Penn Central Railroad's bankruptcy proceedings. When Paul Tibbetts became president of EJA in 1976, he said the company's turnaround, under Sundlun's guidance, was one of the nation's great business success stories of that decade. By the end of Sundlun's presidency, EJA was doing business with approximately 250 contract flying customers and logging more than three million miles per year. Sundlun remained on the board of directors of EJA until it was sold in 1984 to a group of investors led by Richard Santulli. The company is still in business with the name of NetJets as one of the holdings of Berkshire Hathaway.

From 1976 to 1988, Sundlun was president and chief executive officer of The Outlet Company, a department store and broadcast communications company in Providence. In close association with Dody Sinclair, he led the diversification of the corporation by expanding its radio and television broadcast communications portfolio in the 1970s and 1980s until it had 147 retail stores and 11 radio and television stations. He presided over the corporation during the 1981 sale of the company's flagship Providence department store, sale of several radio stations, the merger of The Outlet Company with the Rockefeller Group in 1984, and the renaming of the company to Outlet Communications.

In 1986 after the Rockefeller family voted to not expand further into broadcast communications, a group of Outlet Communications executives, led by Sundlun and Dody Sinclair, executed a leveraged buyout of the company. Remaining as president throughout the entire merger and leveraged buyout sequence, Sundlun led the doubling of Outlet Communications holdings of licensed television broadcast stations from 4 to 11 across the country. During his last three years as president (1986–88), he led the sale of the Outlet Communications stations in Orlando, San Antonio and Sacramento.

== Politics and public service ==
Sundlun was the Democratic nominee for Governor of Rhode Island in 1986 and 1988, losing to incumbent Republican Edward D. DiPrete 65%−32% and 51%−49% respectively. He won it on his third try in 1990, defeating incumbent governor DiPrete in a landslide victory by a 74%–26% margin, the largest majority for any Rhode Island governor at the time. He won reelection in 1992 in a 61%−34% landslide. He would be defeated in the Democratic primary in 1994 by former state senator Myrth York, 57%−28%, with two minor candidates taking the remainder. The New York Times cited tax increases, the credit union crisis, and an admission that he fathered a child out of wedlock for his primary defeat. In his concession speech, Sundlun said "Up to late this afternoon, I thought I was going to win. It just shows once again I'm not much of a politician." York would ultimately be defeated in the general election, and Rhode Island would not have another Democratic governor in office until former Republican Lincoln Chafee switched to the Democratic Party in 2013, having been elected as an Independent candidate in 2010.

Only one hour after Sundlun's inauguration as governor on January 1, 1991, he announced the closure of 45 banks and credit unions in the state due to the collapse of their private insurer, the Rhode Island Share and Deposit Indemnity Corporation (RISDIC). Resolution of the crisis was through Sundlun's creation of the Rhode Island Depositor's Economic Protection Corporation (DEPCO) to manage the assets of closed banks and assure depositor repayment. Sundlun served as the chairman of the DEPCO board of directors and was primarily aided by his director of policy Sheldon Whitehouse. Despite considerable political resistance and the permanent closure of several institutions due to their failure to acquire Federal Deposit Insurance Corporation or National Credit Union Administration insurance, all depositor funds were repaid in full, plus interest, after two and a half years.

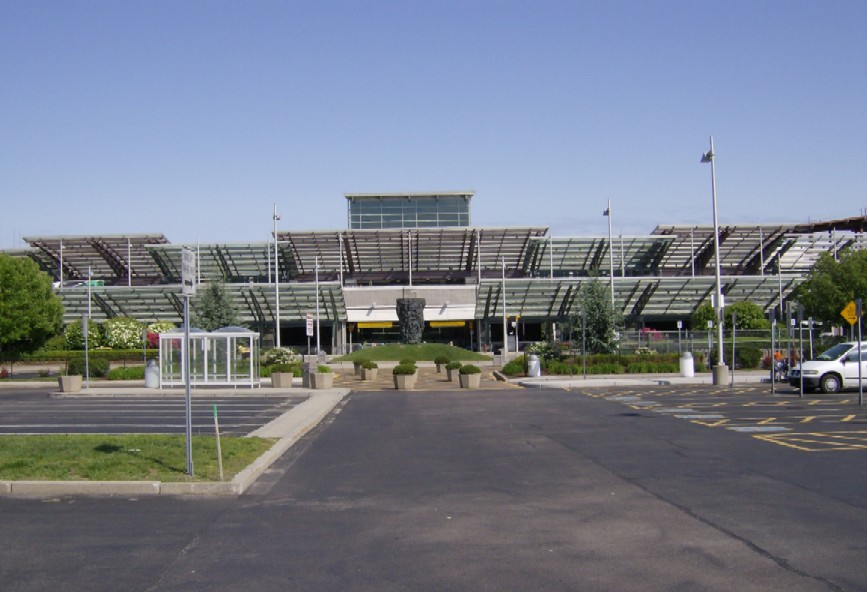
Bruce Sundlun Terminal at T. F. Green Airport in Warwick, Rhode Island

During Sundlun's two terms as governor, he took particular interest in expanding Rhode Island as a destination for conventions and tourism by championing the building of the Rhode Island Convention Center. Later, noting that a shortage of hotels in Providence hindered the city's development as a convention destination, he urged the Rhode Island Convention Center Authority to facilitate the building of a hotel that eventually became The Westin Providence. He created the Rhode Island Airport Corporation as an entity to revitalize and operate Rhode Island's state airports, and he was responsible for a complete redesign and rebuild of the passenger terminal and airport approach roads at T. F. Green Airport in Warwick. In 1992, he aided in the establishment of the Quonset Air Museum at the Quonset State Airport in North Kingstown. He was also responsible for building the Jamestown Verrazzano Bridge, and the Jamestown Expressway, as well as arranging the financing of Providence Place Mall, and the relocation of the Woonasquatucket River to permit the construction of Waterplace Park and the Citizens Bank Building in downtown Providence. The Bruce Sundlun Terminal at T.F. Green Airport is named in his honor, and the airport now generates over $2 billion in economic activity annually. He was the last Rhode Island governor to be elected to a two-year term, as his successor, Lincoln Almond was the first governor to be elected to a four-year term, which Rhode Island enacted in 1994.

Sundlun served as a co-chairman of the inaugural parade committee for President John F. Kennedy in 1960 and 1961, and was appointed by President Kennedy in October 1962 as an incorporating member of the Communications Satellite Corporation (COMSAT), where he served for 30 years as a director. In 1978, President Jimmy Carter appointed him as a member of the Board of Visitors of the United States Air Force Academy where he served two four-year terms, and that same year, he was appointed by Governor Garrahy as a Rhode Island Commodore. He served a four-year term as a director of the National Security Education Board, appointed by President Bill Clinton in 1993.

Sundlun was a delegate to Democratic National Convention in 1964, 1968, 1980, 1988, and 2000, as well as to the Rhode Island Constitutional Convention of 1985. He was a member of the Providence School Board from 1984 to 1990. And from 1995 until his death, Sundlun had been teaching political science and Rhode Island history at the University of Rhode Island as Governor in Residence.

== Personal life ==
From the 1970s to the late 1980s, Sundlun maintained a residence at Salamander Farm, a 130-acre (0.53 km^{2}) estate in The Plains, Virginia, which he named after his wartime identity with the French Underground. From 2004 until his death in 2011, he lived in Jamestown, Rhode Island, with his fifth wife, Susan, a professional photographer and owner of East Greenwich Photo.

Sundlun was married five times and had four children. He was the father of WFSB news anchor Kara (Hewes) Sundlun and father-in-law to Dennis House. He admitted paternity after Hewes filed suit in 1993 alleging that Sundlun had fathered her in a relationship with her mother, Judith Vargo, a.k.a. Judith Hewes. During the initial stages of the suit, Sundlun said that a payment to Judith Hewes of $35,000 in 1976 and Kara's adoption by Robert Hewes in the late 1970s had fully absolved him of financial responsibility in the matter. However, Sundlun accepted Kara Hewes fully as his daughter assuring that her college education was fully financed. Kara has two children (Helena and Julian) by her husband, WTNH news anchor Dennis House.

Sundlun also had three sons from his first marriage (to Madeleine Schiffer Gimbel):

- Tracy Walter Sundlun, vice president of Competitor Group, a promoter and manager of marathon races who at 17 coached track at the 1972 Olympic Games and was the youngest ever Olympic coach; Tracy has a daughter, Felicity.
- Stuart Arthur Sundlun, a financial services executive on several corporate boards of directors, managing the New York operations of Triago and vice chairman of the BMB Group;
- Peter Bruce Sundlun, a commercial airline pilot with Dominion Aviation Services and Atlantic Southeast Airlines until 2009, becoming a Transportation Security Officer with the Transportation Security Administration. Peter has a son, Hunter.

Sundlun died on July 21, 2011, aged 91, at his home in Jamestown, Rhode Island. He was accorded full state and military honors prior to and at his funeral and burial on July 24, 2011. He was buried at Temple Beth El Cemetery in Providence, Rhode Island.

== Media reports and popular controversy ==
In July 1993, when he thought three raccoons on his 4-acre (16,000 m^{2}) estate in Newport were rabid, Sundlun shot at them with a 12-gauge shotgun. Later the Providence Journal-Bulletin reported that the act was illegal according to state fish and game laws. The day of the publication, Sundlun turned himself in to the state police for arrest stating that ethics was the cornerstone of his administration. The state police reluctantly complied, so the case went to court and Sundlun pleaded guilty. But state officials and his own lawyer, Robert Flanders, convinced Sundlun that his actions were not a crime because his estate did not constitute a "compact area" and because the threat of rabies that year had led the state to waive restrictions on shooting raccoons. His guilty plea was withdrawn and all charges were dropped.

After the raccoon shooting incident, Sundlun agreed to pose for a calendar photo for local charity wearing only a raccoon hat while aiming a shotgun and displaying his 8th Air Force tattoo on his shoulder, and he occasionally showed up at downtown eateries in the middle of the night in pajamas and bathrobe to pick up coffee and a late-night snack.

In December 1997, in East Greenwich, Sundlun attempted to purchase some plastic forks after hours from a nearby CVS Pharmacy for a Christmas party he was attending. Employees had closed their registers for the day, yet had not secured the premises. CVS workers apologized for the misunderstanding but said they could not accept payment as the transaction could not be registered due to deactivation of their cash registers. Police were called after an argument let out between Sundlun and the employees. Sundlun eventually issued an apology to the employees and the pharmacy chain for his actions.

On February 24, 2009, Sundlun was involved in a dispute over his place in line at a branch of Citizens Bank in East Greenwich. Sundlun was pushed to the ground by Charles Machado, 59, of Warwick. Sundlun hit his head and was stunned, but he declined to press charges against Machado.

In his later years, Sundlun had been involved in some traffic accidents and traffic violations, which led two Rhode Island police departments, North Kingstown in 2007 and Jamestown in 2009, to convince the state Department of Motor Vehicles to evaluate Sundlun's ability to drive. In 2008, he was admonished by authorities of University of Rhode Island about his driving on the campus after separate incidents in which he drove on a sidewalk, nearly hit a professor who was walking with a cane, and allegedly hit a parked car. Sundlun passed the first driving test which was the result of the North Kingstown request. On April 30, 2009, Sundlun voluntarily surrendered his license.

On June 4, 2009, Sundlun was on a WPRO radio talk show in which he claimed that he flew a private plane owned by U.S. Bankruptcy Judge Arthur Votolato, 79, from T.F. Green Airport to Hartford, Connecticut. Within days, Judge Votolato and Sundlun had issued a statement that the judge was in fact in full control of the aircraft. While Votolato's pilot's license had been maintained up to date, Sundlun's commercial pilot's license had expired in the late 1970s.

== See also ==
- List of governors of Rhode Island

== Notes ==
Party political offices
Preceded by Anthony Solomon	Democratic nominee for Governor of Rhode Island; 1986, 1988, 1990, 1992	Succeeded by Myrth York
Political offices
Preceded by Edward D. DiPrete	Governor of Rhode Island; 1991–1995	Succeeded by Lincoln Almond
