= 1976 Rhode Island gubernatorial election =

- November 2, 1976
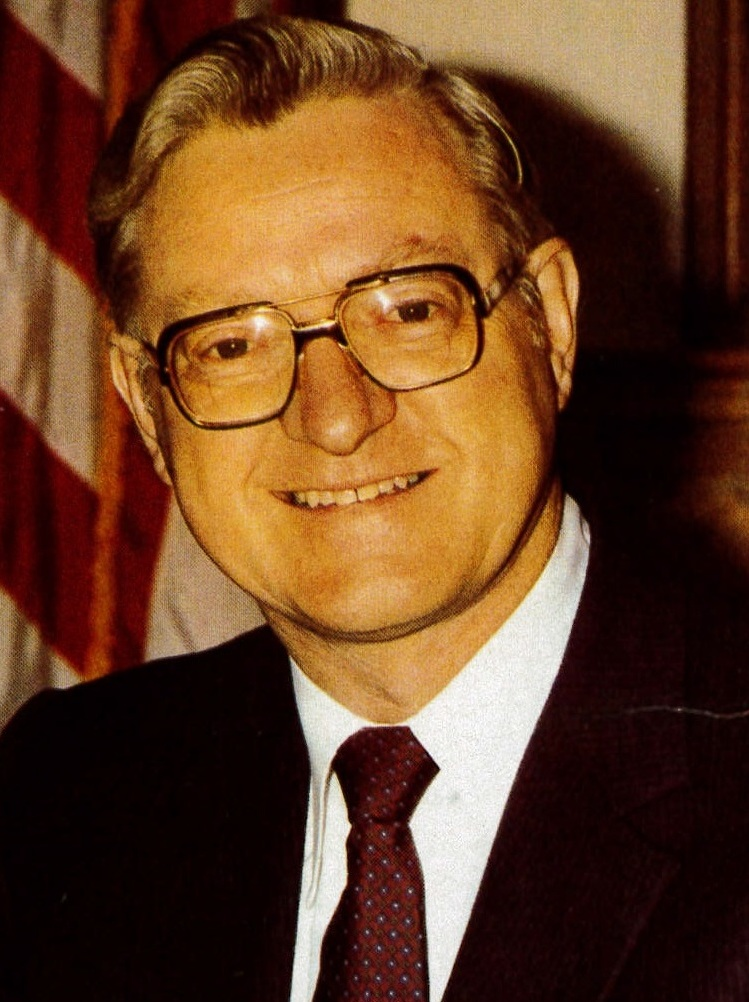

Nominee	J. Joseph Garrahy	James L. Taft Jr.
Party	Democratic	Republican
Popular vote	218,561	178,254
Percentage	54.82%	44.71%
- Garrahy: 40–50% 50–60% 60–70% Taft: 50–60% 60–70%
Governor before election
Philip Noel
Democratic
Elected Governor
J. Joseph Garrahy
Democratic

The 1976 Rhode Island gubernatorial election was held on November 2, 1976. Democratic nominee J. Joseph Garrahy defeated Republican nominee James L. Taft Jr. with 54.82% of the vote.

== Primary elections ==
Primary elections were held on September 14, 1976.

=== Democratic primary ===
==== Candidates ====
- J. Joseph Garrahy, incumbent lieutenant governor
- Giovanni Folcarelli, former lieutenant governor

==== Results ====
Democratic primary results
Party	Candidate	Votes	%
Democratic	J. Joseph Garrahy	113,625	82.37
Democratic	Giovanni Folcarelli	24,314	17.63
Total votes		137,939	100.00

== General election ==
=== Candidates ===
Major party candidates

- J. Joseph Garrahy, Democratic
- James L. Taft Jr., Republican

Other candidates

- John C. Swift, Independent
- Stewart L. Engel, Libertarian

=== Results ===
1976 Rhode Island gubernatorial election
Party	Candidate	Votes	%	±%
Democratic	J. Joseph Garrahy	218,561	54.82%	
Republican	James L. Taft Jr.	178,254	44.71%	
Independent	John C. Swift	1,267	0.32%	
Libertarian	Stewart L. Engel	601	0.15%	
Majority		40,307		
Turnout		398,683		
Democratic hold		Swing		

==== By county ====
	Joseph Garrahy Democratic		James Taft Republican		All Others Independent	
County	Votes	%	Votes	%	Votes	%
Bristol	10,532	50.5%	10,233	49.1%	96	0.4%
Kent	33,250	48.1%	35,556	51.4%	308	0.4%
Newport	16,802	53.9%	14,193	45.5%	195	0.6%
Providence	142,024	58.5%	99,522	41.0%	1,093	0.4%
Washington	15,953	45.7%	18,750	53.8%	176	0.5%

Counties that flipped from Democratic to Republican

- Kent
- Washington
