= 1982 Rhode Island gubernatorial election =

- November 2, 1982
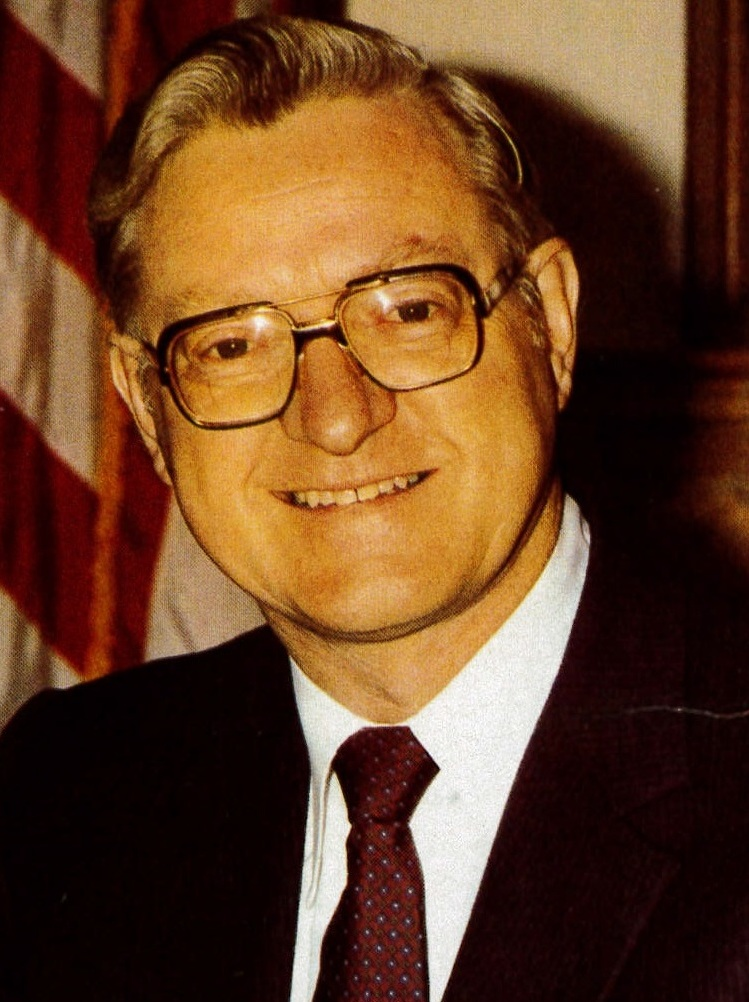

| Nominee | J. Joseph Garrahy | Vincent Marzullo |
| Party | Democratic | Republican |
| Popular vote | 247,208 | 79,602 |
| Percentage | 73.30% | 23.60% |
- Garrahy: 50–60% 60–70% 70–80% 80–90%
Governor before election
J. Joseph Garrahy
Democratic
Elected Governor
J. Joseph Garrahy
Democratic

The 1982 Rhode Island gubernatorial election was held on November 2, 1982. Incumbent Democrat J. Joseph Garrahy defeated Republican nominee Vincent Marzullo with 73.30% of the vote.

== General election ==
=== Candidates ===
Major party candidates

- J. Joseph Garrahy, incumbent governor (Democratic)
- Vincent Marzullo, director of the governor's Energy Office, 1978 nominee for lieutenant governor in 1978 (Republican)

Other candidates

- Hilary R. Salk, Citizens
- Peter Van Daam, Independent

=== Results ===
1982 Rhode Island gubernatorial election
| Party | Candidate | Votes | % | ±% |
|---|---|---|---|---|
| Democratic | J. Joseph Garrahy (incumbent) | 247,208 | 73.30% | |
| Republican | Vincent Marzullo | 79,602 | 23.60% | |
| Citizens | Hilary R. Salk | 7,033 | 2.09% | |
| Independent | Peter Van Daam | 3,405 | 1.01% | |
| Majority | | 167,606 | | |
| Turnout | | 337,259 | | |
| Democratic hold | | Swing | | |

==== By county ====
| | Joseph Garrahy Democratic | | Vincent Mazullo Republican | | All Others | |
| County | Votes | % | Votes | % | Votes | % |
|---|---|---|---|---|---|---|
| Bristol | 12,134 | 71.4% | 4,463 | 26.2% | 409 | 2.4% |
| Kent | 41,117 | 71.2% | 14,990 | 26.0% | 1,647 | 2.8% |
| Newport | 19,190 | 73.6% | 6,235 | 23.9% | 662 | 2.6% |
| Providence | 152,440 | 74.8% | 45,145 | 22.2% | 6,220 | 3.0% |
| Washington | 22,327 | 68.5% | 8,769 | 26.9% | 1,500 | 4.6% |
