= James L. Taft Jr. =

American politician

Mayor of Cranston
- In office 1971–1979
- Succeeded by: Edward D. DiPrete

Member of the Rhode Island Senate
- In office 1963–1971

Personal details
- Born: October 21, 1930 Providence, Rhode Island, U.S.
- Died: September 5, 2011 (aged 80) Wakefield, Rhode Island, U.S.
- Party: Republican

James L. Taft Jr. (October 21, 1930 – September 5, 2011) was an American politician who served in the Rhode Island Senate from 1963 to 1971 and as the Mayor of Cranston from 1971 to 1979.

He died on September 5, 2011, in Wakefield, Rhode Island at age 80.

== See also ==
- List of mayors of Cranston, Rhode Island

Party political offices
Preceded by James W. Nugent	Republican nominee for Governor of Rhode Island; 1976	Succeeded by Lincoln Almond
