= 1990 Rhode Island gubernatorial election =

- November 6, 1990
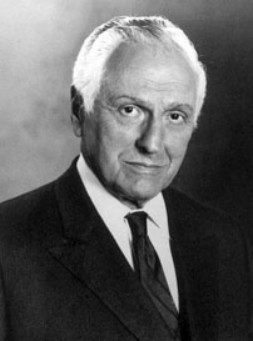

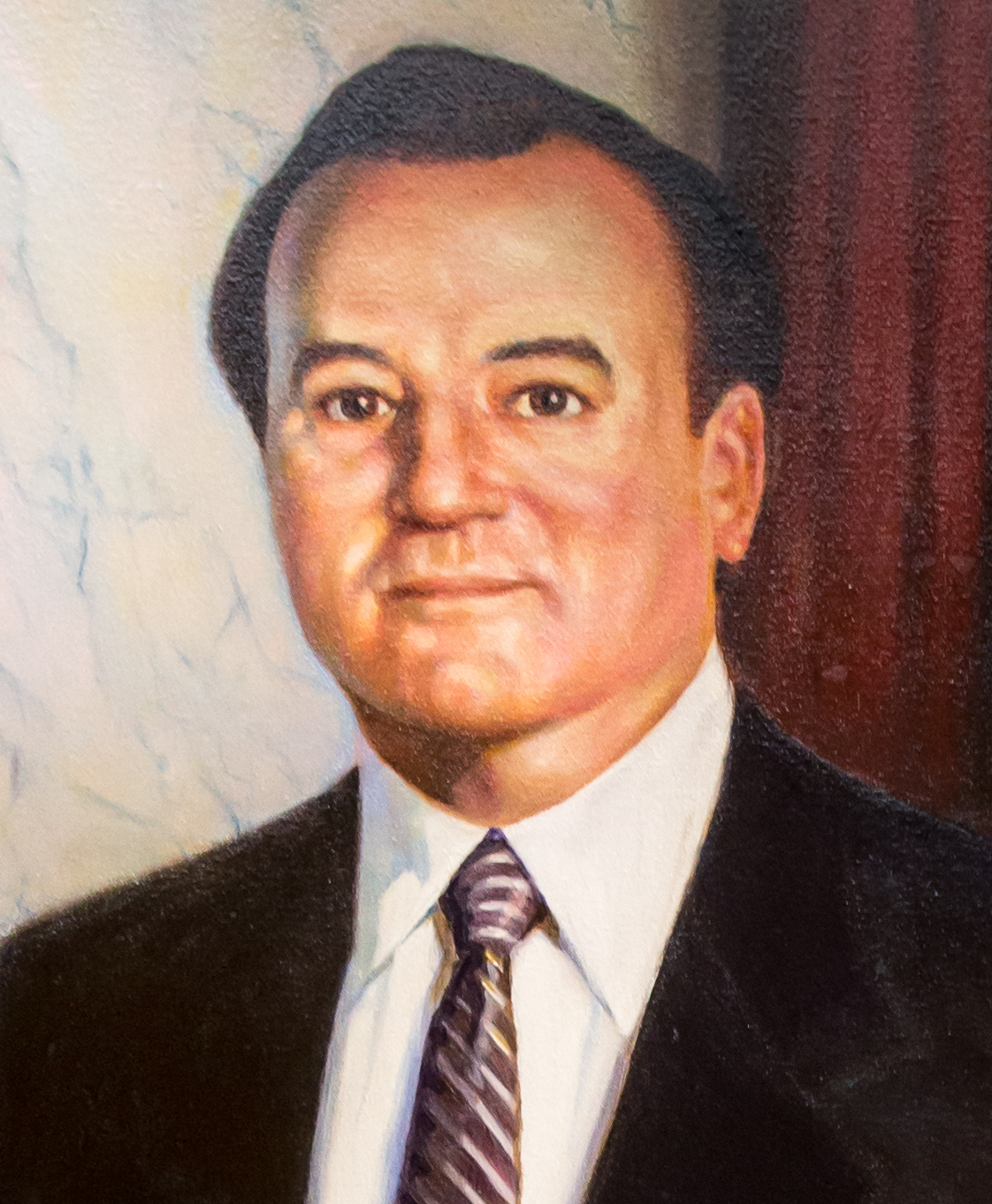
Nominee	Bruce Sundlun	Edward D. DiPrete
Party	Democratic	Republican
Popular vote	264,411	92,177
Percentage	74.15%	25.85%
- Sundlun: 60–70% 70–80% 80–90%
Governor before election
Edward D. DiPrete
Republican
Elected Governor
Bruce Sundlun
Democratic

The 1990 Rhode Island gubernatorial election was held on November 6, 1990. Democratic nominee Bruce Sundlun defeated incumbent Republican Edward D. DiPrete in a landslide. Sundlun won 74.15% of the vote to DiPrete’s 25.85%.

Sundlun carried every single county and municipality by double digits. To date, this is the last time that an incumbent governor of Rhode Island lost re-election. (Note: Dan McKee lost renomination in the Democratic Party primary in 2026.)

== Primary elections ==
Primary elections were held on September 11, 1990.

=== Republican primary ===
==== Candidates ====
- Edward D. DiPrete, incumbent governor
- Steve White

==== Results ====
Republican primary results
Party	Candidate	Votes	%
Republican	Edward D. DiPrete (incumbent)	7,644	70.77
Republican	Steve White	3,157	29.23
Total votes		10,801	100.00

=== Democratic primary ===
==== Candidates ====
- Bruce Sundlun, businessman
- Francis X. Flaherty, Mayor of Warwick
- Joseph R. Paolino Jr., Mayor of Providence

==== Results ====
Results by municipality: Sundlun: Sundlun—30–40%; Sundlun—40–50%; Sundlun—50–60%; Flaherty: Flaherty—30–40%; Flaherty—40–50%; Paolino: Paolino—30–40%; Paolino—40–50%; Paolino—50–60%

Democratic primary results
Party	Candidate	Votes	%
Democratic	Bruce Sundlun	68,021	40.51
Democratic	Francis X. Flaherty	53,821	32.05
Democratic	Joseph R. Paolino Jr.	46,074	27.44
Total votes		167,916	100.00

== General election ==
=== Candidates ===
- Bruce Sundlun, Democratic
- Edward D. DiPrete, Republican

=== Results ===
1990 Rhode Island gubernatorial election
Party	Candidate	Votes	%
Democratic	Bruce Sundlun	264,411	74.15%
Republican	Edward D. DiPrete (incumbent)	92,177	25.85%
Total votes		356,672	100.00%
Democratic gain from Republican			

==== By county ====
	Bruce Sundlun Democratic		Edward DiPrete Republican	
County	Votes	%	Votes	%
Bristol	13,415	70.0%	5,745	30.0%
Kent	48,702	74.6%	16,555	25.4%
Newport	20,981	72.6%	7,915	27.4%
Providence	153,783	75.2%	50,629	24.8%
Washington	27,530	70.8%	11,333	29.2%

Counties that flipped from Republican to Democratic

- Bristol
- Kent
- Newport
- Washington
