= 1988 Rhode Island gubernatorial election =

- November 8, 1988
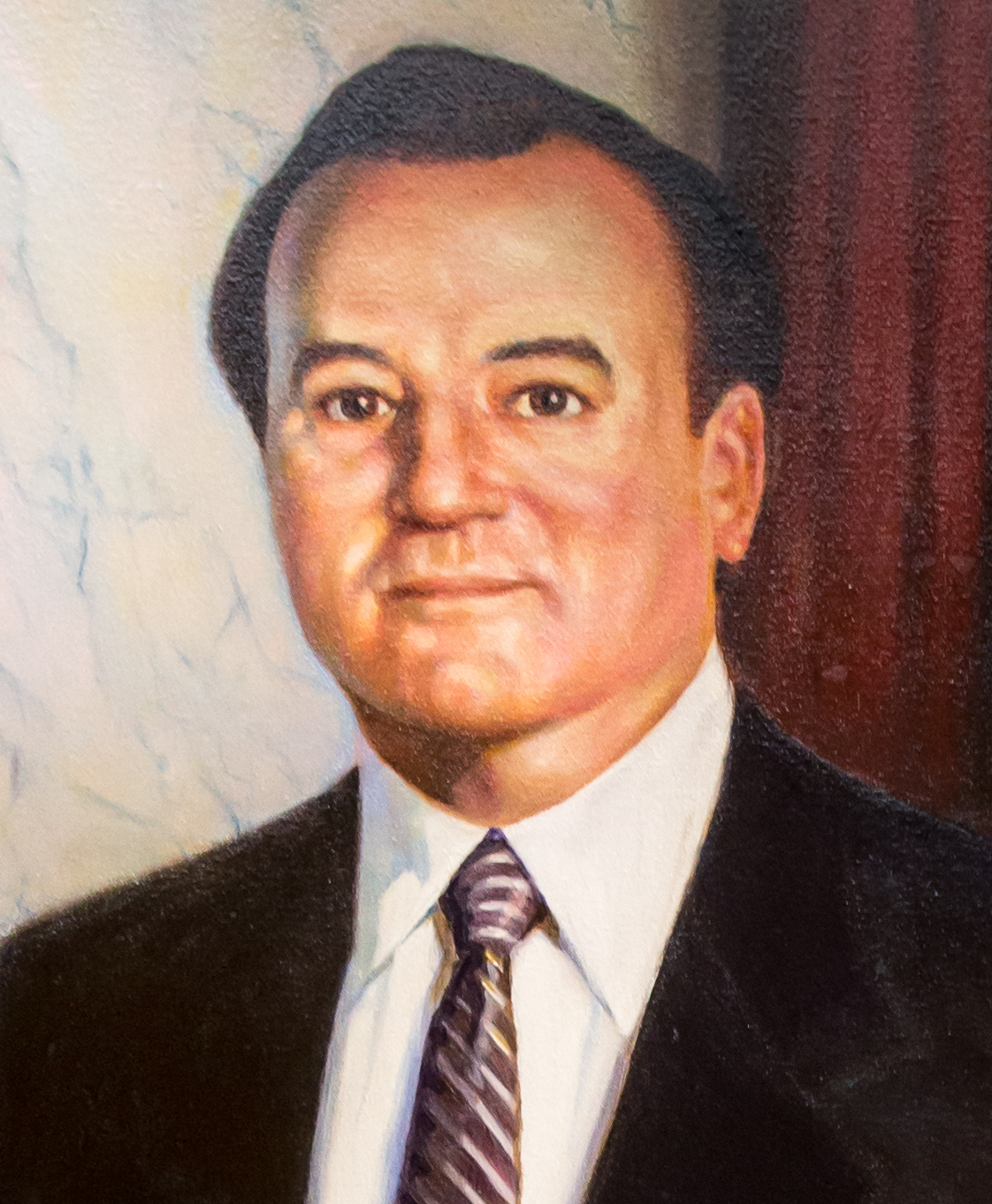

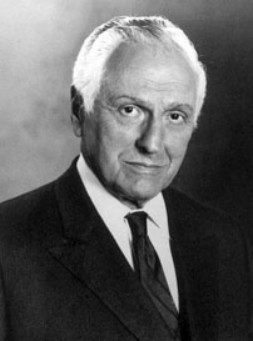
| Nominee | Edward D. DiPrete | Bruce Sundlun |
| Party | Republican | Democratic |
| Popular vote | 203,550 | 196,925 |
| Percentage | 50.83% | 49.17% |
- DiPrete: 50–60% 60–70% Sundlun: 50–60% 60–70%
Governor before election
Edward D. DiPrete
Republican
Elected Governor
Edward D. DiPrete
Republican

The 1988 Rhode Island gubernatorial election was held on November 8, 1988. Incumbent Republican Edward D. DiPrete defeated Democratic nominee Bruce Sundlun with 50.83% of the vote.

== Primary elections ==
Primary elections were held on September 14, 1988.

=== Democratic primary ===
==== Candidates ====
- Bruce Sundlun, businessman
- Peter Van Daam

==== Results ====
Democratic primary results
| Party | Candidate | Votes | % |
|---|---|---|---|
| Democratic | Bruce Sundlun | 68,065 | 90.28 |
| Democratic | Peter Van Daam | 7,328 | 9.72 |
| Total votes | | 75,393 | 100.00 |

== General election ==
=== Candidates ===
- Edward D. DiPrete, Republican
- Bruce Sundlun, Democratic

=== Results ===
1988 Rhode Island gubernatorial election
| Party | Candidate | Votes | % | ±% |
|---|---|---|---|---|
| Republican | Edward D. DiPrete (incumbent) | 203,550 | 50.83% | |
| Democratic | Bruce Sundlun | 196,925 | 49.17% | |
| Majority | | 6,614 | | |
| Turnout | | 400,516 | | |
| Republican hold | | Swing | | |

==== By county ====
| | Edward DiPrete Republican | | Bruce Sundlun Democratic | |
| County | Votes | % | Votes | % |
|---|---|---|---|---|
| Bristol | 12,327 | 56.1% | 9,406 | 43.3% |
| Kent | 36,565 | 51.1% | 35,022 | 48.9% |
| Newport | 17,370 | 51.2% | 16,561 | 48.8% |
| Providence | 112,783 | 49.3% | 115,861 | 50.7% |
| Washington | 24,505 | 55.0% | 20,086 | 45.0% |

Counties that flipped from Republican to Democratic

- Providence
