= Edward D. DiPrete =

American politician (1934–2025)

Ed DiPrete
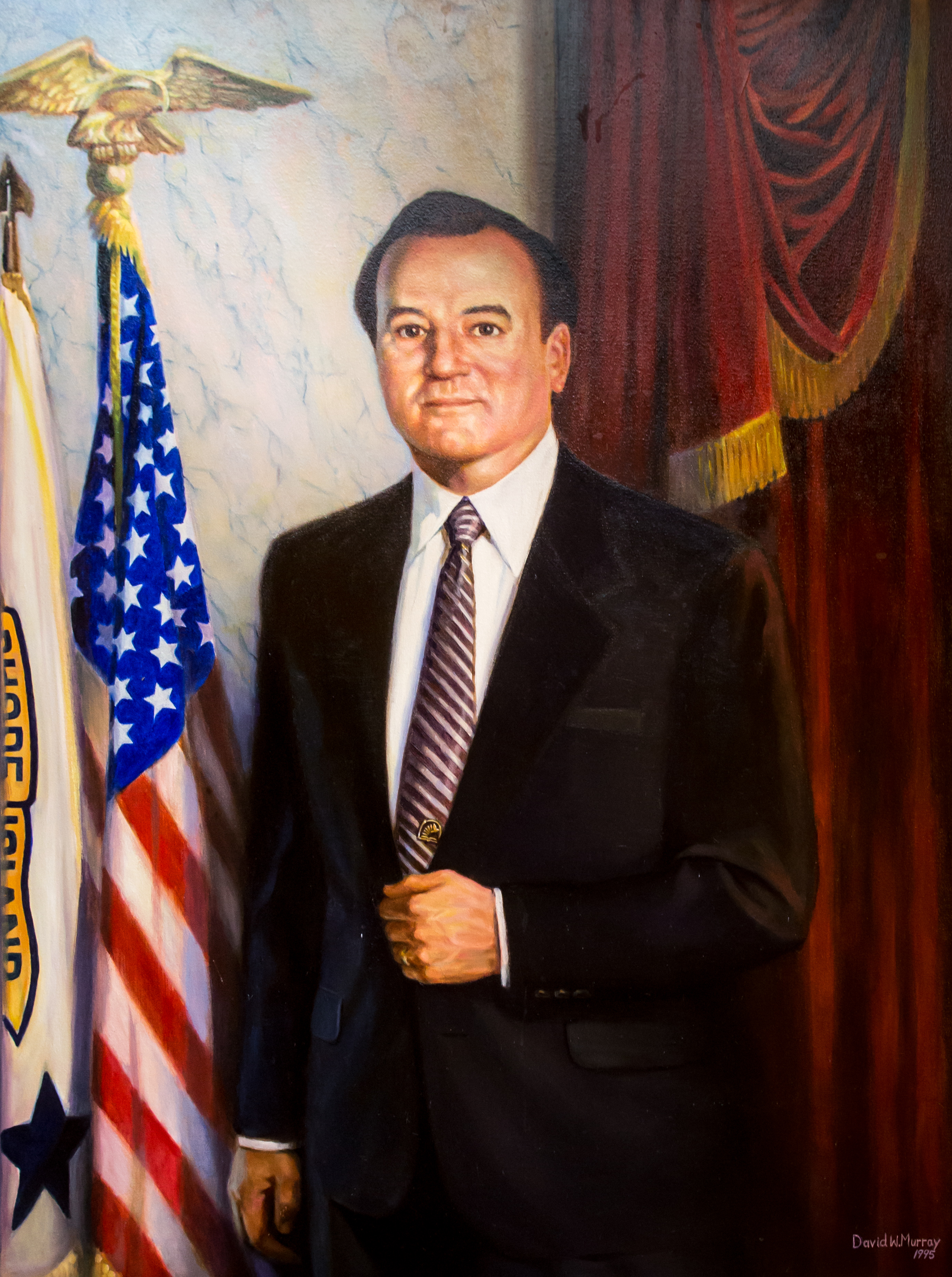

70th Governor of Rhode Island
- In office January 1, 1985 – January 1, 1991
- Lieutenant: Richard A. Licht; Roger N. Begin
- Preceded by: John Garrahy
- Succeeded by: Bruce Sundlun

Mayor of Cranston
- In office 1978–1985
- Preceded by: James L. Taft Jr.
- Succeeded by: Michael Traficante

Personal details
- Born: Edward Daniel DiPrete; July 8, 1934 Cranston, Rhode Island, U.S.
- Died: July 8, 2025 (aged 91) Cranston, Rhode Island, U.S.
- Party: Republican
- Spouse: Patricia DiPrete (died 2011)
- Children: 7
- Education: College of the Holy Cross (BA)

Military service
- Branch/service: United States Navy; United States Navy Reserve
- Years of service: 1955–1959 (Navy); 1959–1967 (Reserve)
- Rank: Lieutenant Commander

Edward Daniel DiPrete (July 8, 1934 – July 8, 2025) was an American politician. He served as the 70th governor of Rhode Island for three two-year terms, serving from 1985 to 1991. Convicted of numerous corruption charges, he was the only Rhode Island governor to have gone to prison.

== Early life ==
DiPrete was born in Cranston, Rhode Island, on July 8, 1934, the son of Maria Grossi and Frank A. DiPrete. He graduated from the College of the Holy Cross, and received honorary degrees from Holy Cross, Providence College, Bryant College, and the University of Rhode Island. He also served in the United States Navy. From 1970 to 1974, he served on the Cranston School Committee. From 1974 to 1978, he served as an at-large member of the Cranston City Council. He served as mayor of the city from 1978 to 1985.

== Governor of Rhode Island ==
DiPrete was elected in the 1984 gubernatorial election and served as the 70th governor of Rhode Island from 1985 to 1991, and was defeated for reelection in a landslide by former U.S. government attorney and millionaire businessman Bruce Sundlun in the 1990 election, who had previously lost twice (1986 and 1988) to DiPrete.

In 1994, DiPrete was indicted on criminal charges relating to the awarding of state contracts during his service as governor. All charges were dismissed in March 1997 by a Rhode Island Superior Court Judge who also found the State Attorney General's office guilty of 10 findings of "egregious prosecutorial misconduct."

He was subsequently charged again, and in December 1998, he pleaded guilty to state charges of bribery, extortion, and racketeering, and was sentenced to a year in prison.

In a plea bargain, he also admitted accepting $250,000 in exchange for state contracts during his term as governor. DiPrete agreed to this plea bargain only after receiving assurance that pending charges against one of his sons would be dismissed. Those charges against his son were dismissed in their entirety prior to DiPrete agreeing to the plea bargain. In addition, his state retirement pension was revoked, despite attempts to have it reinstated. DiPrete served eleven months in Adult Correctional Institutions.

Subsequently, the state Supreme Court overturned the denial of DiPrete's pension benefits to his wife and remanded the case back to Superior Court for a new hearing. Because of a degenerative neurological disease, Mrs. DiPrete, notified the court through her attorney, she wished to terminate the request, and the new hearing ordered by the Supreme Court did not proceed.

== Personal life and death ==
DiPrete was known for his "everyman" persona, serving supermarket fried chicken to guests in his Winnebago motor home. He parked the motor home outside the Rhode Island State House during a snowstorm in February 1987 so that he would be able to come to work despite heavy snowfall. DiPrete kept an arcade Pac-Man game in his house, which he demonstrated to President George H. W. Bush in 1989.

DiPrete and his wife Patricia had seven children; Patricia died in 2011. DiPrete lived in his home in Cranston until October 2016, when he moved to an apartment in the Garden City section of that city.

DiPrete died at his home in Cranston on July 8, 2025, his 91st birthday.

== Electoral history ==
Rhode Island Gubernatorial Election 1984
Party	Candidate	Votes	%
Republican	Edward D. DiPrete	245,059	60.0%
Democratic	Anthony J. Solomon	163,311	40.0%

Rhode Island Gubernatorial Election 1986
Party	Candidate	Votes	%
Republican	Edward D. DiPrete (incumbent)	208,822	64.7%
Democratic	Bruce Sundlun	104,504	32.4%
Cool Moose	Robert J. Healey	5,964	1.8%
Citizens Party	Anthony D. Affigne	3,481	1.1%

Rhode Island Gubernatorial Election 1988
Party	Candidate	Votes	%
Republican	Edward D. DiPrete (incumbent)	203,550	50.8%
Democratic	Bruce Sundlun	196,925	49.2%

Rhode Island Gubernatorial Election 1990
Party	Candidate	Votes	%
Republican	Edward D. DiPrete (incumbent)	92,177	25.8%
Democratic	Bruce Sundlun	264,411	74.2%

== See also ==
- List of mayors of Cranston, Rhode Island

Party political offices
Preceded by Vincent Marzullo	Republican nominee for Governor of Rhode Island; 1984, 1986, 1988, 1990	Succeeded by Elizabeth Leonard
Political offices
Preceded by John Garrahy	Governor of Rhode Island; 1985–1991	Succeeded by Bruce Sundlun
