= J. Joseph Garrahy =

American governor of Rhode Island

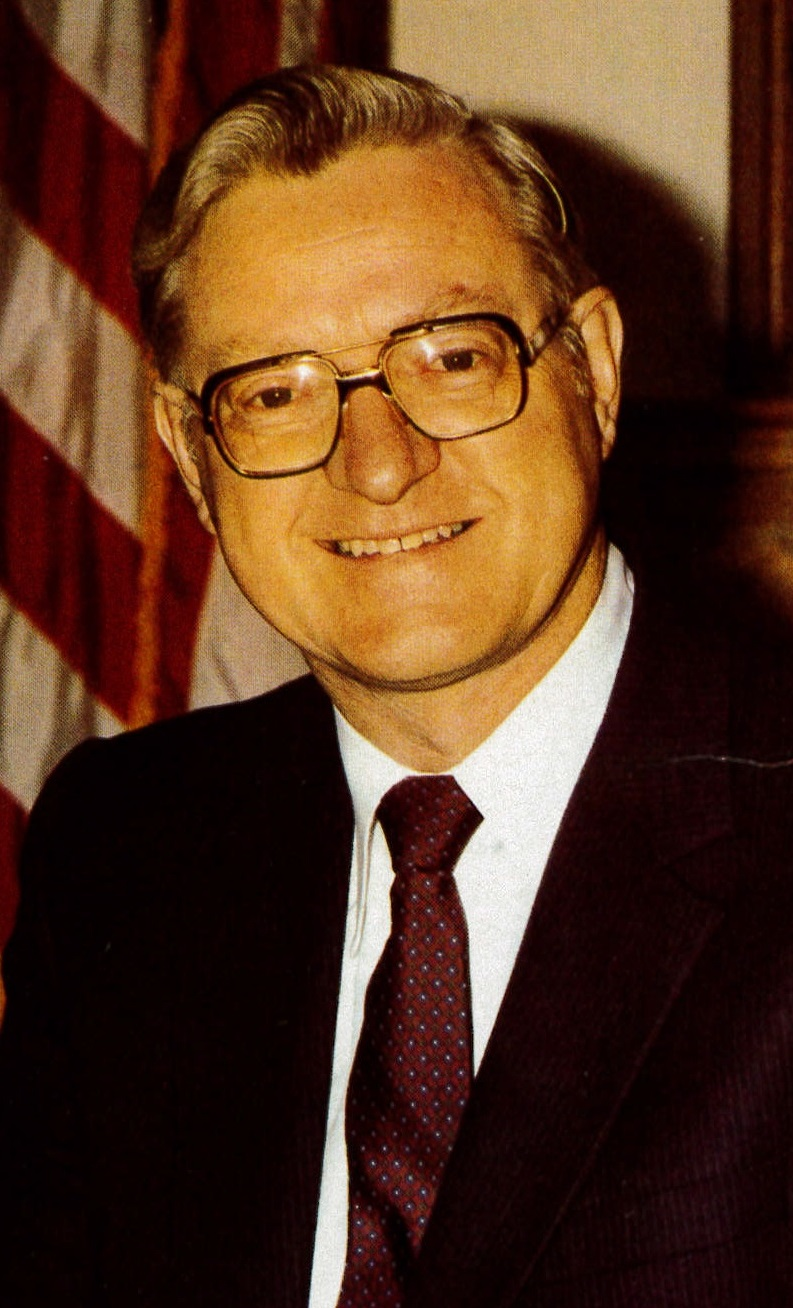
- Garrahy in 1978

69th Governor of Rhode Island
- In office January 4, 1977 – January 1, 1985
- Lieutenant: Thomas R. DiLuglio
- Preceded by: Philip Noel
- Succeeded by: Edward D. DiPrete

61st Lieutenant Governor of Rhode Island
- In office January 7, 1969 – January 4, 1977
- Governor: Frank Licht; Philip Noel
- Preceded by: Joseph O'Donnell Jr.
- Succeeded by: Thomas R. DiLuglio

Member of the Rhode Island Senate
- In office 1963–1969

Personal details
- Born: John Joseph Garrahy; November 26, 1930 Providence, Rhode Island, U.S.
- Died: January 24, 2012 (aged 81) West Palm Beach, Florida, U.S.
- Party: Democratic
- Spouse: Margherite DePietro
- Children: 5
- Education: University at Buffalo; University of Rhode Island
- Profession: Politician

Military service
- Branch/service: United States Air Force
- Years of service: 1953–1955
- Rank: Staff sergeant

John Joseph Garrahy (November 26, 1930 – January 24, 2012), known to Rhode Islanders as J. Joseph Garrahy or just "Joe", was an American politician. He served as the 69th governor of Rhode Island from 1977 to 1985.

== Early life ==
Garrahy was born on November 26, 1930, in Providence, Rhode Island. Garrahy achieved the rank of Eagle Scout on August 25, 1947, at age 16. He attended La Salle Academy in Providence. After high school, he joined the New York Air National Guard near Buffalo, and starting in 1952, he attended the University at Buffalo. In 1953, he attended the University of Rhode Island. Later that year, Garrahy joined the United States Air Force, where he served until 1955 while stationed in Upstate New York and was involved with logistics. He became a staff sergeant.

After his military service, Garrahy married Margherite De Pietro with whom he had five children. Garrahy embarked on a business career, primarily as a salesman with the Narragansett Brewing Company.

== Political career ==
Garrahy was elected to the Rhode Island Senate in 1962 as a Democrat, and served there until 1968. While in the Senate, he also served as Deputy Majority leader from 1963 onwards.

In 1968, Garrahy was elected the 61st lieutenant governor, and served in that office until 1977.

== Governorship ==
In November 1976 Garrahy was elected Governor of Rhode Island, defeating Republican James Taft in the general election with 54 percent of the vote. He took office in January 1977 and served as governor until 1985, after being reelected in 1978, 1980 and 1982. By the end of his four terms, Garrahy was immensely popular, and likely could have served longer if he wanted. On his death in 2012, Garrahy was remembered as a "people's governor" and a friend of the working class.

=== Achievements ===
During his time as Governor, Garrahy:

- Fought to clean up pollution in Narragansett Bay
- Worked to preserve open space for recreation
- Improved the care of children with developmental disabilities
- Championed programs for the elderly
- Worked to transition mentally disabled people from institutions to home care
- Led efforts to attract high-tech business to the state

=== Blizzard of 1978 ===
The defining event of Garrahy's governorship was the Great Blizzard of February 1978. The blizzard paralyzed the entire state with up to 56 inches of snow. Garrahy lived in his office at the Rhode Island State House in Providence for three days until the crisis was under control. Garrahy was remembered for wearing a red and black plaid flannel shirt during the crisis. The shirt became widely associated with Garrahy; in 2000, he donated the shirt to the Rhode Island Historical Society, where it was placed on display. For years afterward, Garrahy would be asked about the shirt.

Garrahy's response to the storm became a template for public officials reacting to similar situations. Garrahy's calm demeanor and pleasant personality provided comfort to many Rhode Islanders in distress during the blizzard's aftermath.

In 1980, Garrahy traveled to the Soviet Union as part of an arms control delegation.

Although Republican candidates in Rhode Island were largely successful in the 1984 elections, Garrahy was not seen as a primary factor in their success. Despite political reform being a major campaign theme for Republicans that year, there were no scandals associated with Garrahy.

== Later life ==
In 1988, Garrahy was named to the Rhode Island Heritage Hall of Fame. He served on the board of the Providence and Worcester Railroad since 1992. He was active in the Knights of Columbus, and was also an active Rhode Island Commodore. Garrahy summered in Florida, and died in West Palm Beach on January 24, 2012. He was buried at New Saint Francis Cemetery in South Kingstown.

Political offices
Preceded by Joseph O'Donnell Jr.	Lieutenant Governor of Rhode Island; 1969–1977	Succeeded by Thomas R. DiLuglio
Preceded by Philip W. Noel	Governor of Rhode Island; 1977–1985	Succeeded by Edward D. DiPrete
Party political offices
Preceded by Philip Noel	Democratic nominee for Governor of Rhode Island; 1976, 1978, 1980, 1982	Succeeded by Anthony J. Solomon
