= Lincoln Chafee 2016 presidential campaign =

American political campaign

Lincoln Chafee for President
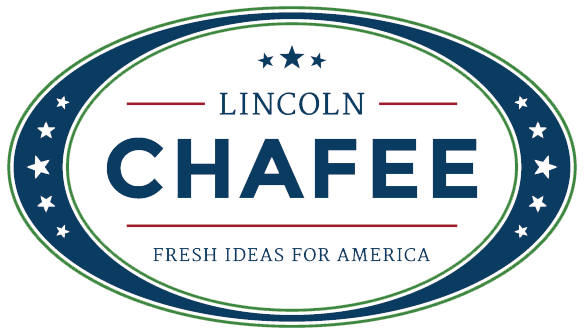
- Campaign: 2016 Democratic Party presidential primaries
- Candidate: Lincoln Chafee; Governor of Rhode Island (2011–2015); U.S. Senator (1999–2007)
- Affiliation: Democratic Party
- EC formed: April 9, 2015
- Announced: June 3, 2015
- Suspended: October 23, 2015
- Headquarters: 1800 Post Road Unit 17B; Warwick, Rhode Island
- Key people: Debbie Rich (spokeswoman) Jonathan Stevens
- Receipts: US$418,135 (2015-12-31)
- Slogan: Fresh Ideas for America

Website
- www.chafee2016.com (Archived)

The 2016 presidential campaign of Lincoln Chafee, the 74th governor of Rhode Island, and former United States senator from Rhode Island, was formally launched on June 3, 2015. His campaign for the Democratic nomination for President of the United States in the 2016 election was his first campaign as a Democrat, after having previously been elected senator as a Republican, and governor as an independent. He received zero votes either formally or by write-in, meaning he got the fewest votes of any major party candidate in the Democratic or Republican Primaries 2016.

== Background ==
=== Political career in Rhode Island ===
Chafee's father, John Chafee, was the senior United States senator from Rhode Island, who had intended to retire, and not seek reelection in 2000; Lincoln had intended to run to win his father's seat the same year. On October 24, 1999, John Chafee died, and Republican Governor Lincoln Almond appointed his son, then a Republican to fill the vacancy of his Republican father. Due to the proximity between his appointment and the scheduled election in 2000, no special election was called. Chafee was elected to his seat outright with a large majority.

Having been seen as the most liberal Republican senator, Chafee was faced with a tough primary battle against Steve Laffey in 2006, which he won by a 54 to 46 percent margin. His battle with Laffey in the primary excessively drained his campaign funds. Chafee lost to Democrat Sheldon Whitehouse, and was one of six Republican seats lost when Democrats regained their majority in the midterm elections of 2006.

After his Senate loss, Chafee left the Republican Party, saying, "it's not my party anymore". After a hiatus following his loss, he announced his candidacy for Governor of Rhode Island; in a seven-way race, Chafee won the governorship with 36 percent of the vote. Having previously indicated the possibility that he might run for re-election for Governor as a Democrat, Chafee officially joined the Democratic Party on May 30, 2013. He chose against running for re-election in 2014.

=== Presidential politics ===
In the 2008 presidential election, he formally endorsed the Democratic nominee Barack Obama. In 2012, Chafee was one of 35 co-chairs selected to serve on President Barack Obama's re-election campaign.

On April 9, 2015, Chafee announced that he had formed an exploratory committee in preparation for a potential candidacy for the Democratic Party's 2016 presidential nomination. The following month, on May 29, it was confirmed that Chafee would announce his decision regarding a 2016 presidential bid on June 3.

== Campaign ==
Chafee formally announced his presidential candidacy in a speech he delivered at the George Mason Center for Politics & Foreign Relations in Arlington, Virginia on June 3, 2015.

=== Chafee's Ten Points for Prosperity through Peace ===
- No Ambassadorship for Sale
- No Torture
- No warrantless wiretapping
- Bring Edward Snowden home
- No drone strikes
- Fair Trade Agreements
- Reduce Tensions with Russia
- Repair Relations with South America and revisit the War on Drugs
- Ban Capital Punishment
- Go Metric

=== Polling ===
Chafee had been the lowest-polling candidate out of the five major declared candidates, often narrowly behind former Virginia Senator Jim Webb and former Maryland Governor Martin O'Malley, oftentimes polling at less than 1%.

=== Debate performance ===
Chafee participated in the first of the Democratic primary debates on October 13, 2015. Many felt the format favored the predominant candidates Clinton and Sanders, who received much more time than the others. In addition, Chafee was repeatedly interrupted by moderator Anderson Cooper. His performance was widely panned by voters and commentators alike, primarily citing his poor responses to questions regarding how he voted while in the Senate, as well as changing his party affiliation multiple times. In the aftermath of the debate, Chafee's candidacy was further discredited by pundits, with some even describing it as "futile." His performance was mocked by "Saturday Night Live," which portrayed him as a bumbling space cadet. "Good night America, bye forever," his doppelgänger said with a wave.

=== Withdrawal ===
Following a poor debate performance, low polling numbers and paltry fundraising, Chafee announced on October 23, 2015 that he would be suspending his campaign.

== See also ==
- Political positions of Lincoln Chafee
- Democratic Party presidential candidates, 2016
