= Justice Shea =

Justice Shea may refer to:

- Daniel J. Shea (judge) (born 1938), associate justice of the Montana Supreme Court
- David M. Shea (1922–2003), associate justice of the Connecticut Supreme Court
- Donald F. Shea (1925–2019), associate justice of the Rhode Island Supreme Court
- Jim Shea (judge) (born 1966), associate justice of the Montana Supreme Court
- William J. Shea (1900–1965), associate justice of the Connecticut Supreme Court

== See also ==
- Judge Shea (disambiguation)
