= 1994 United States Senate election in Rhode Island =

- November 8, 1994
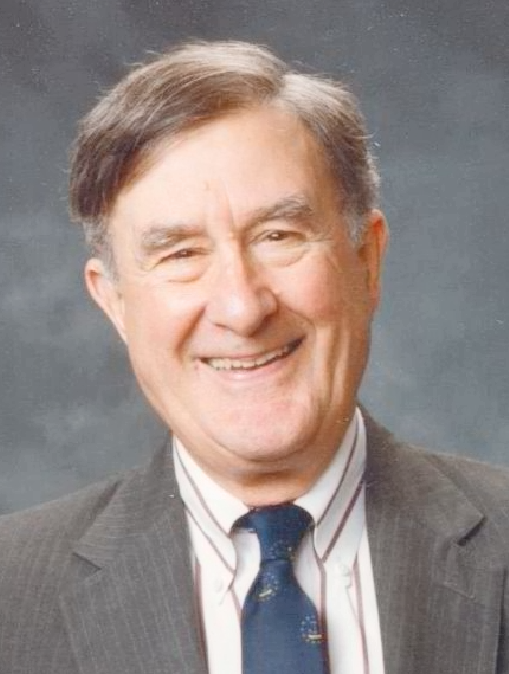

| Nominee | John Chafee | Linda Kushner |
| Party | Republican | Democratic |
| Popular vote | 222,856 | 122,532 |
| Percentage | 64.52% | 35.48% |
- Chafee: 50–60% 60–70% 70–80%
U.S. senator before election
John Chafee
Republican
Elected U.S. Senator
John Chafee
Republican

The 1994 United States Senate election in Rhode Island was held November 8, 1994. Incumbent Republican U.S. Senator John Chafee won re-election to a fourth term, as well as his planned final term. Chafee died of heart-failure on October 24, 1999, at Walter Reed Army Medical Center, having already announced his intention to retire in 2000 on March 15, 1999. His son Lincoln, then the mayor of Warwick, was appointed to replace him by Governor Lincoln Almond.

== Democratic primary ==
=== Candidates ===
- Linda Kushner, State Representative

=== Results ===
Kushner faced no opposition in the Democratic primary.

== Republican primary ==
=== Candidates ===
- John Chafee, incumbent U.S. Senator
- Robert A. Post, Jr.

=== Results ===
Republican primary results
| Party | Candidate | Votes | % |
|---|---|---|---|
| Republican | John Chafee (Incumbent) | 27,906 | 69.03 |
| Republican | Robert A. Post, Jr. | 12,517 | 30.97 |
| Total votes | | 40,423 | 100.00 |

== General election ==
=== Candidates ===
- John Chafee (R), incumbent U.S. Senator
- Linda Kushner (D), State Representative

=== Polling ===
| Source | Date | Chaffee (R) | Kushner (D) |
|---|---|---|---|
| Brown University | October 2, 1994 | 55% | 24% |
| Providence Journal-Bulletin | November 4, 1994 | 58% | 27% |

=== Results ===
Chafee was re-elected in what would be his final Senate term. He would die in 1999 and be succeeded by his son, Lincoln Chafee.

General election results
| Party | Candidate | Votes | % | ±% |
|---|---|---|---|---|
| Republican | John Chafee (Incumbent) | 222,856 | 64.52% | +9.93% |
| Democratic | Linda Kushner | 122,532 | 35.48% | −9.93% |
| Majority | | 100,324 | 29.05% | +19.86% |
| Turnout | | 345,388 | | |
| Republican hold | | Swing | | |

== See also ==
- 1994 United States Senate elections
