= Linda Kushner =

American politician (born 1939)

Personal details
- Born: Linda Jane Rosen; March 27, 1939 (age 87)
- Party: Democratic
- Education: Brandeis University (BA); Boston University (MEd)

Linda Jane Kushner (née Rosen; born March 27, 1939) is an American former politician. A Democrat, she was a member of the Rhode Island House of Representatives for the 4th district from 1983 to 1993. She unsuccessfully ran in the 1994 United States Senate election in Rhode Island, but lost to Republican John Chafee.

== Early life ==
Kushner was born on March 27, 1939, to a Jewish family. Her parents were Selma C. Rosen, an art collector who worked closely with the Baltimore Museum of Art, and Israel Rosen. She had one brother, Richard. She attended Brandeis University in Boston, Massachusetts, where she received a Bachelor of Arts degree in 1960. The next year, she received a masters of education from Boston University. As a college student, she travelled to Baltimore, Maryland, to receive an illegal abortion.

== Political career ==
A Democrat, Kushner was elected to the Rhode Island House of Representatives in 1983, as the representative for the 4th district. The following year, she introduced a bill that would have banned discrimination against gays and lesbians, although it failed to pass the legislature. She sponsored a gun control bill that would have banned "Saturday night specials" in 1989, when she was deputy majority leader. In 1993, she led a campaign to pass a bill in the state house that would have made abortion legal. It passed the lower chamber by a vote of 51–42 but failed to pass the state senate.

=== 1994 Senate campaign ===
In 1994, Kushner decided not to run for re-election to her state legislature seat in order to join the United States Senate race in Rhode Island. She received the Democratic party's nomination after running unopposed in the primary. In the general, she challenged Republican incumbent John Chafee. Due to her opponent's popularity, she was considered unlikely to win and ultimately lost the election, receiving 36% of the vote to his 64%.

== Personal life ==
Kushner is married and has two children. She was a member of the Women's Political Caucus, the Rhode Island Bar Association and the League of Women Voters.

== Later life ==
In 2019, Kushner spoke before the state's House Judiciary committee hearing on various abortion bills to share her experiences of receiving an abortion in 1960. She was appointed to the state's Democratic Senatorial District Committee in 2021, to choose the candidate who received the party's endorsement for the 3rd district in the 2022 general elections.

Party political offices
Preceded by Richard Licht	Democratic nominee for U.S. Senator from Rhode Island (Class 1); 1994	Succeeded by Robert Weygand
