= Senator Licht =

Senator Licht may refer to:

- Frank Licht (1916–1987), Rhode Island State Senate
- Richard A. Licht (born 1948), Rhode Island State Senate
