= Governor Chafee =

Governor Chafee may refer to:

- John Chafee (1922–1999), 66th Governor of Rhode Island
- Lincoln Chafee (born 1953), 74th Governor of Rhode Island
