= List of mayors of Warwick, Rhode Island =

The following is a list of mayors of the city of Warwick, Rhode Island, United States.

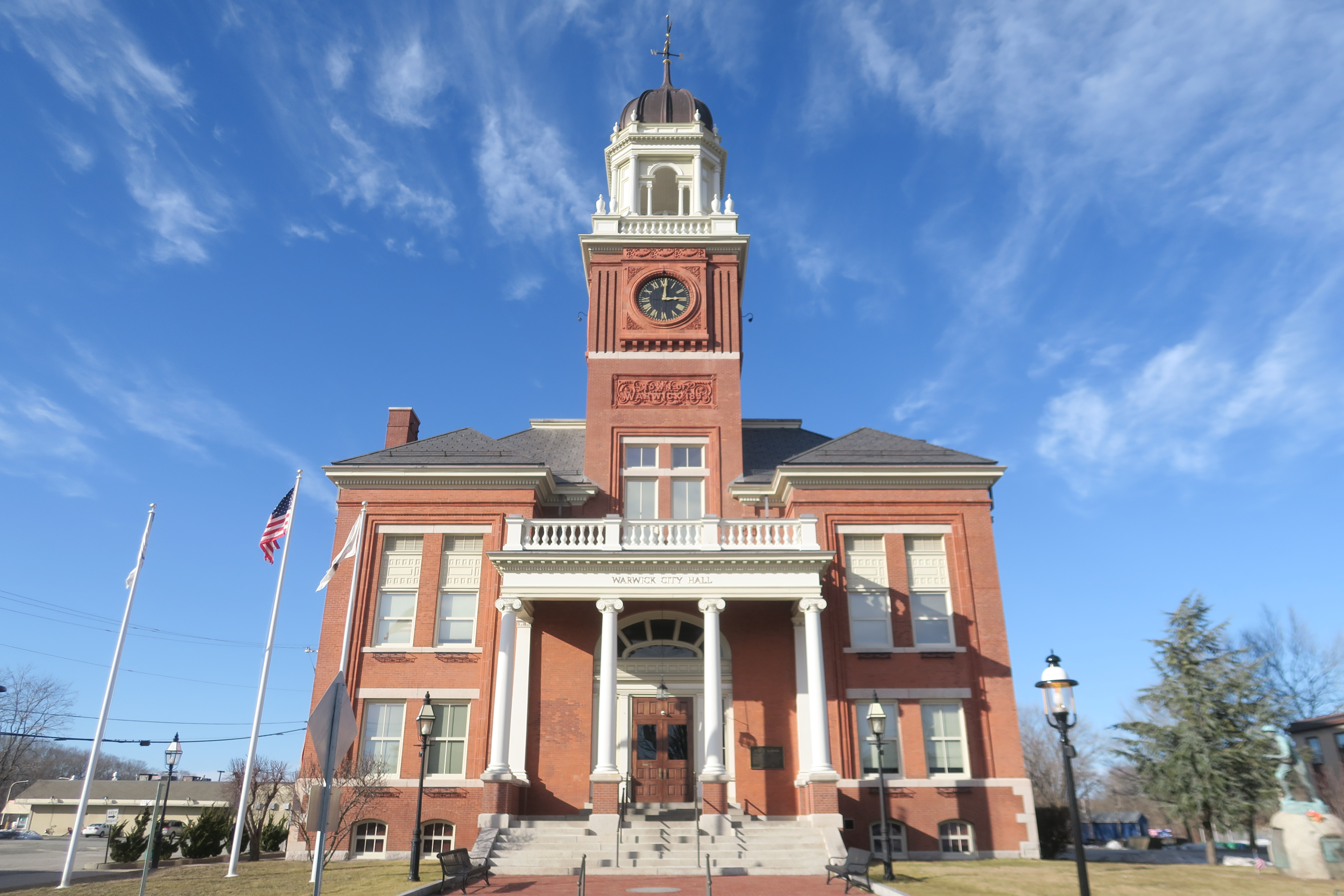
City hall building in Warwick, Rhode Island (photo 2019)

- Peirce H. Brereton, 1933-1934
- John A. O'Brien, 1935-1936
- Albert Pradervand Ruerat, 1937-1948
- Joseph Mills, 1949-1952, 1955-1956
- Darius L. Goff, 1953-1954
- Raymond E. Stone, 1957-1960
- Horace E. Hobbs, 1961-1966
- Philip William Noel, 1967-1972
- Eugene J. McCaffrey Jr., 1973-1976
- Joseph W. Walsh, 1977-1984
- Francis X. Flaherty, 1985-1990
- Charles D. Donovan, 1991-1992
- Lincoln Davenport Chafee, 1993-1999
- Gerry Gibbons, 1999-2000
- Scott Avedisian, 2000-2018
- Joseph J. Solomon Sr., 2018-2020
- Frank J. Picozzi, 2020-present

== See also ==
- Warwick history
