= Melissa A. Long =

American judge (born 1970 or 1971)

Melissa Long

Associate Justice of the Rhode Island Supreme Court
- Incumbent
- Assumed office January 11, 2021
- Appointed by: Gina Raimondo
- Preceded by: Francis Flaherty

Personal details
- Born: Melissa Austin; 1970 or 1971 (age 54–55)
- Education: University of Virginia (BA); George Mason University (JD)

Melissa Austin Long (born 1970 or 1971) is an American lawyer who has served as an associate justice of the Rhode Island Supreme Court since 2021. She previously served as an associate justice of the Rhode Island Superior Court from 2017 to 2021.

== Education and legal career ==
Long received a Bachelor of Arts from the University of Virginia in 1992 and her Juris Doctor from the George Mason University School of Law in 1995. After law school, she clerked for retired Fairfax County Judge Marcus D. Williams, and then worked in the Public Defenders office representing indigent parents in terminations of parental rights cases. Long worked in the appellate division of the Rhode Island Public Defender’s Office before serving in a variety of roles at the Rhode Island Department of Transportation, including Senior Legal Counsel and Title VI Coordinator. Long served as Deputy Secretary of State and Director of Administration within the office of the Secretary of State of Rhode Island. She now serves as the chair of the state's Committee on Racial & Ethnic Fairness in the Courts.

== State court service ==
=== Rhode Island Superior Court ===
On June 27, 2017, Rhode Island Governor Gina Raimondo appointed Long to be an associate justice of the Rhode Island Superior Court to fill the vacancy left by the retirement of Judge Patricia A. Hurst. On September 19, 2017, her nomination was approved in the Rhode Island Senate. She was sworn in by Governor Raimondo on October 12, 2017.

=== Rhode Island Supreme Court ===
Long was one of six final candidates being considered for a vacancy on the Rhode Island Supreme Court. On December 8, 2020, Long was nominated by Governor Raimondo to be an associate justice of the Rhode Island Supreme Court, replacing Justice Francis Flaherty, who retired on December 31, 2020. On December 18, 2020, her nomination was confirmed by the Rhode Island Senate. With her confirmation, Long became the first African American on the court. Since the confirmation of Long and Erin Lynch Prata, the five-member court has a female majority for the first time in its history. She was sworn into office on January 11, 2021.

Legal offices
Preceded by Francis Flaherty	Associate Justice of the Rhode Island Supreme Court; 2021–present	Incumbent
