= Steve Laffey =

American politician and businessman

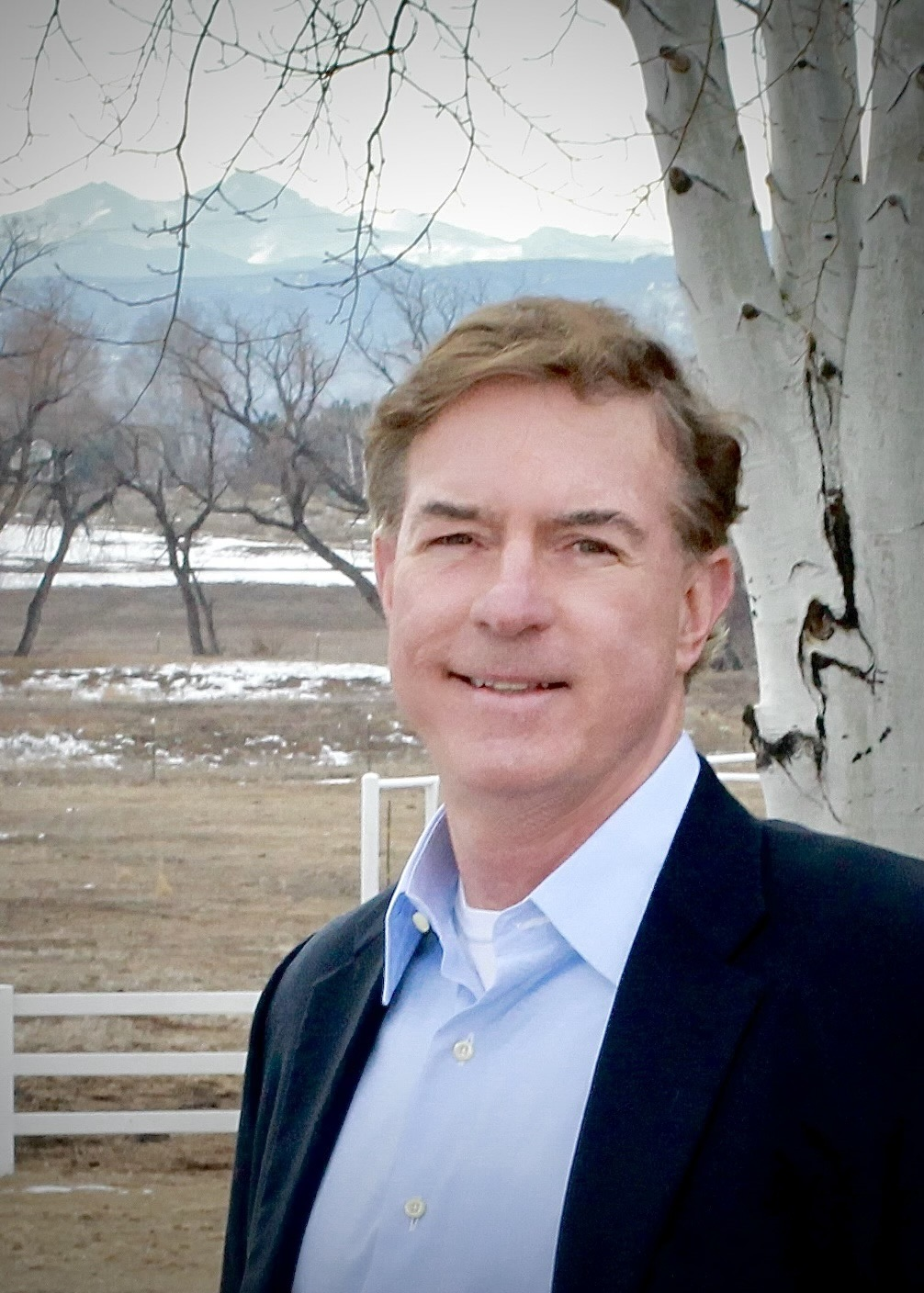
- Laffey in 2023

Mayor of Cranston
- In office January 6, 2003 – January 6, 2007
- Preceded by: John O'Leary
- Succeeded by: Michael Napolitano

Personal details
- Born: 1962 (age 63–64) Warwick, Rhode Island, U.S.
- Party: Independent
- Other political affiliations: Republican (until 2023)
- Spouse: Kelly Laffey
- Education: Bowdoin College (BA); Harvard University (MBA)
- Website: Official website

Stephen Patrick Laffey /ˈlæfiː/ (born 1962) is an American politician and businessman who served as the mayor of Cranston, Rhode Island, from 2003 to 2007. A former member of the Republican Party (now unaffiliated), Laffey lost primary bids for the United States Senate from Rhode Island in 2006 and the House of Representatives from Colorado's 4th congressional district in 2014.

A former executive of Morgan Keegan & Company, Laffey wrote the 2012 documentary Fixing America. In February 2023, Laffey announced he would seek the Republican nomination for the 2024 United States presidential election, becoming the first Republican challenger to Donald Trump. He withdrew from the race on October 6, 2023, and left the Republican Party to become an independent.

== Early life ==
Laffey was born in 1962 in Warwick, Rhode Island, to John and Mary Laffey. He grew up with four other siblings and at the age of four his family moved to Cranston. Laffey's childhood was less than perfect. His eldest brother died of AIDS and two other siblings suffered from schizophrenia. His father worked as a toolmaker and union steward at Armbrust Chain Company while his mother worked as a night nurse. Laffey attended Cranston High School East where he was described as an "assertive and aggressive student." He was co-captain of the basketball team and president of the student council.

== Education ==
Laffey is credited as being the first person in his family to go to college. He decided to apply to Bowdoin College in Brunswick, Maine, on the advice of his high school history teacher and was accepted with full scholarship. He attended Bowdoin from 1980 to 1984 where he majored in economics. While at Bowdoin, Laffey began getting involved in politics. He co-founded the Bowdoin Patriot, the school's conservative newspaper, and was elected president of the student government. He also co-hosted the radio show The Joe Show on WBOR with his roommate Tom Marcelle. He was also credited as being responsible for a full-fledged conservative movement at the university.

Upon graduating magna cum laude from Bowdoin in 1984, Laffey attended Harvard Business School. He received a full ride to Harvard from the George and Mary Knox Scholarship at Bowdoin. While at Harvard, he was published in the Wall Street Journal for an op-ed entitled What They Do Teach You at Harvard Biz. He graduated with an MBA from Harvard in 1986.

== Business career ==
Laffey had a stated goal of becoming the president of a financial firm by the time he was 40 years old. In June 1992, he began working for Morgan Keegan & Company, a Tennessee-based brokerage firm with $500 million in revenues and over 2,000 employees. He worked in various positions within the company including director of research, head of equity trading, head of institutional sales, and chair of two venture capital funds. In 2000, he was named president and chief operating officer at the age of 38. He worked a total of 9 years for the company.

As President and COO, Laffey was responsible for a number of tasks including everything from administrative tasks to oversight of the company's private equity and institutional equity business. One company insider described him as being in charge of everything except bond trading and the Wall Street Journal cited him as the "sole decision maker" over picking stocks for the firm's focus list. He also served as the chairman of several investment committees and directly oversaw the firm's group of private equity investments and their analyst research branch. He left the company in 2001 after initiating and overseeing the sale of the firm to Regions Financial Corporation, a deal reported to be worth $789 million. He was replaced by Doug Edwards; and, in addition to Edwards, Keegan hired three additional executives to assume the duties of Laffey.

== Political career and campaigns ==
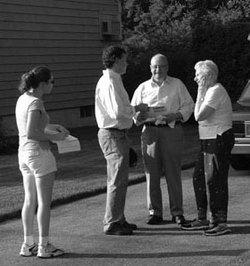
Steve Laffey speaking with Cranston residents during his 2002 mayoral campaign.

Upon leaving Keegan, Laffey went to Vermont during the summer of 2001. While there, he attended a retreat at Camp of the Woods, a Christian conference center in the Adirondacks. He attended the retreat with some of his Harvard Business School classmates and it was at that time that he stated he felt the "call" to enter politics. Laffey was quoted as saying:

When I was asked where I was from, I said I was from Cranston, Rhode Island," Laffey recalls. "Why did I say I was from Cranston? I'd been away for 20 years. But I felt I was supposed to go back to Cranston, Rhode Island, even though I didn't know why.

Laffey moved back to Cranston with his wife and children and ran for mayor in 2002.

=== Mayor ===
Laffey challenged well-known Democrat Aram Garabedian in 2002 for mayor of Cranston. He recruited numerous local and well-known Cranston residents, including Democratic gubernatorial candidate executive committee member Norman Orodenker who stepped down from his position to assist Laffey with his campaign. Laffey stood on street corners and knocked on doors handing out Laffy Taffy to help spread his name. Laffey defeated Garabedian 14,688 to 13,359 and took office in January 2003. He was re-elected for a second term in 2004 by earning 65% of the vote. When he entered office in 2003, Cranston had the lowest bond rating in America and its city pension had only $9 million in assets and $250 million in liabilities.

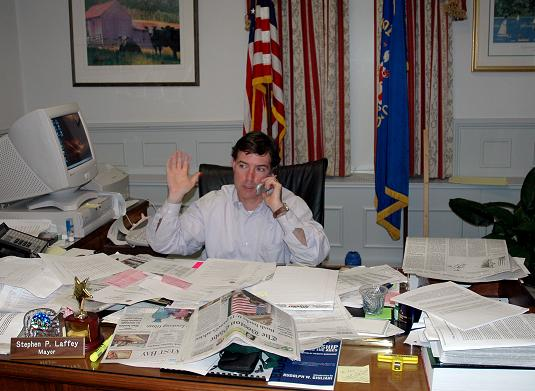
Steve Laffey working in the Mayor's office in Cranston, Rhode Island.

Laffey was criticized by many government workers during his term as mayor. His critics were mainly unions representing the city workers including the union representing the city crossing guards. He privatized the 39 crossing guard positions to save the city $800,000 per year. He also faced opposition from the firefighter's union and the school union. Laffey credits this to confronting unions and cutting excesses in school spending. In 2006, Laffey distinguished Cranston by making it the only Rhode Island city to cut property taxes that year.

Laffey was the host of his own radio show in 2005 on WPRO in Rhode Island. The Steve Laffey Show came under attack when he was accused of using free airtime to obtain name recognition. The Board of Elections ruled unanimously that the free airtime and name recognition amounted to political contributions in excess of $1,000, a violation of state law. The show ran on Fridays and Laffey was not paid for hosting the show; however, the Board of Elections ordered him to shut down the show. Laffey then filed a lawsuit against the Board citing violation of his 1st Amendment rights and for treating him differently than other politicians. The 1st Circuit Court of Appeals gave the Board time to reconsider their action and consult with the Rhode Island Supreme Court on the issue. After the decision, the Board allowed Laffey to return to the air.

=== 2006 United States Senate campaign ===
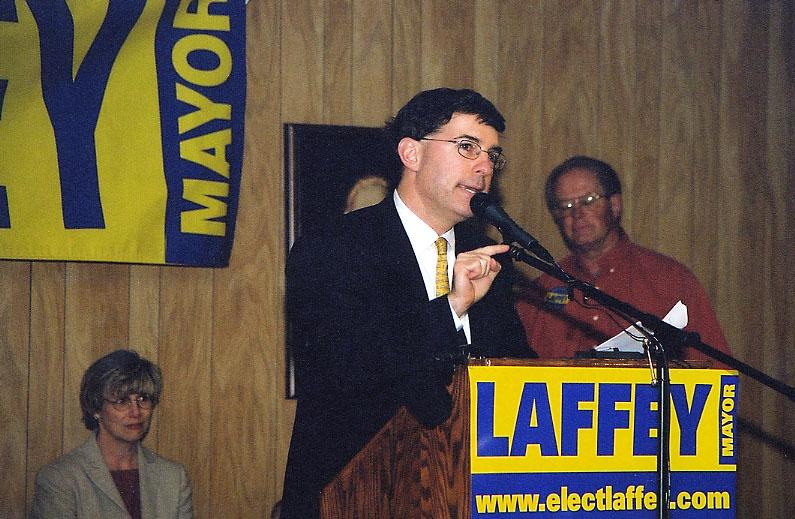
Laffey giving a speech during his 2002 mayoral campaign.

On September 8, 2005, Laffey announced that he would be running for the United States Senate. He faced incumbent Republican Lincoln Chafee. Laffey ran as the populist/conservative alternative to Chafee, being anti-abortion, and supporting both the Central American Free Trade Agreement and Samuel Alito's appointment to the Supreme Court. Main points of Laffey's campaign include eliminating what he calls pork barrel spending, simplifying the tax code, and reducing prescription drug costs. He was considered "the metabolic opposite of Chafee" by Joe Klein and was said to "enjoy populist tirades against corporate special interests (especially the oil companies)", favoring a robust alternative energy plan for national security reasons. Laffey also ran against big government spending, being supported by the anti-tax group Club for Growth.

Prior to making the announcement to run, the GOP tried to talk him out of it. Elizabeth Dole and then Rhode Island Republican Governor Donald Carcieri urged Laffey to run for lieutenant governor, putting him in a strong position to seek the governorship. Laffey instead elected to run for Senate, leading Dole and Karl Rove to actively work to defeat him. Laffey was endorsed by Steve Forbes who also organized a fundraiser for him. He also debated Chafee which was aired nationally by C-SPAN. The primary was followed nationally due to the Senate seat being considered one that could give control of Congress back to the Democratic party.

During the primary, Chafee and the National Republican Senatorial Committee attacked Laffey for calling for the city of Cranston to accept consular ID cards from Mexico and Guatemala. Mailers sent out by the Chafee campaign called the cards "illegal immigration cards" and said accepting them poses a security risk. However, others contended that the cards help police and immigrants. The national Republican establishment went after Laffey, believing he was too conservative for heavily liberal Rhode Island. The NRSC spent $1 million in TV ads attacking Laffey.

Laffey was defeated by Chafee in the primary election on September 12, 2006. The Republican primary was the largest turnout in Rhode Island history. Although he lost the primary, Laffey received a total of 29,500 votes, more than the 27,906 votes received by John Chafee in 1994 and more than the combined GOP gubernatorial primary of Carcieri and James Bennett in 2002. The actions of the National Republican Senatorial Campaign Committee during the primary were referred to as unprecedented as they engaged in attacks on an elected Republican. Chafee was eventually defeated by Democratic state attorney general Sheldon Whitehouse in the general election by an 8-point margin (54% to 46%). Despite Chafee's high approval ratings statewide, Whitehouse pointed out that Chafee supported his party's more conservative leadership. After the defeat, Chafee stated that he was unsure if he would remain in the GOP and stated that he felt that the loss may have helped switch control of power in Congress back to the Democrats.

=== 2010 gubernatorial campaign ===
Laffey was believed to be a potential candidate for the governorship in 2010. He was rumored to be a candidate with incumbent Republican Donald Carcieri being unable to run for a third term due to Rhode Island's two term limit. He later announced he would not run. He declared that he would run for Governor of Colorado in 2014, but withdrew from the race a week later after former Congressman Tom Tancredo declared that he would also run.

=== 2014 United States House of Representatives campaign ===
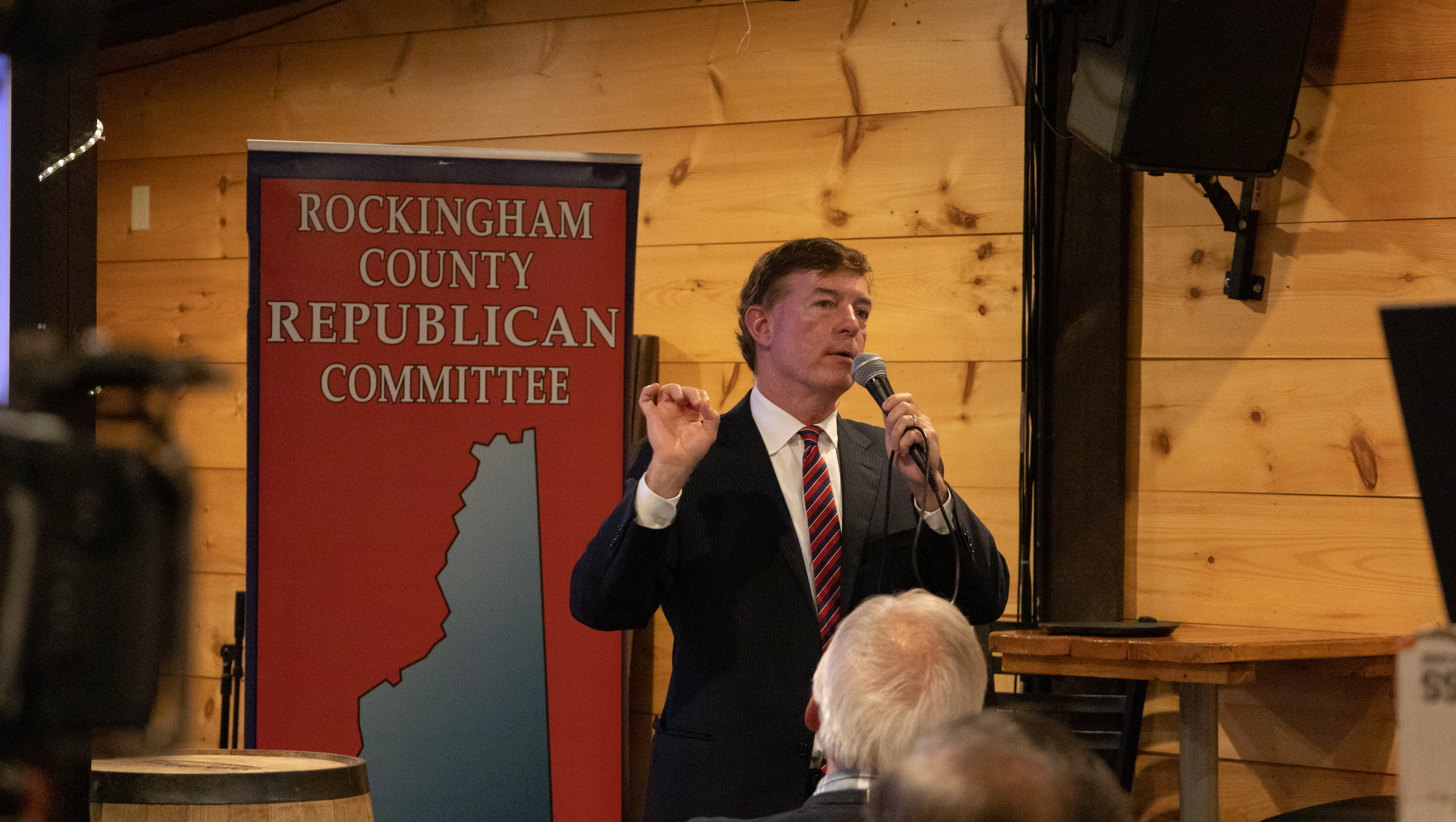
Steve Laffey speaking to the Rockingham County Republican Committee in Kingston NH

Laffey sought the Republican nomination for Colorado's 4th congressional district in 2014. He finished fourth in the primary with 16% of the vote, behind winner Ken Buck (44%), Scott Renfroe (24%), and Barbara Kirkmeyer (16%).

=== 2024 U.S. presidential campaign ===
Laffey announced he would run for president on February 2, 2023, in the 2024 Republican primary. He pledged to visit every citizen in New Hampshire to discuss his ideas. He was the first Republican challenger against Donald Trump and positioned himself as an alternative to Trump, focusing on economic issues while criticizing the direction of the Republican Party. He withdrew from the race on October 6, 2023, and left the Republican Party to become an independent.

== Writing and filmmaking ==
=== Author ===
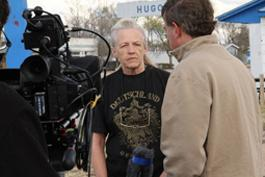
Steve Laffey during the filming of Fixing America on a stop in Colorado.

Laffey is the author of the book Primary Mistake: How the Washington Republican Establishment Lost Everything in 2006 (and Sabotaged My Senatorial Campaign). The book was published in 2007 by Penguin Group Publishing. The book details his 2006 Senatorial campaign loss as well as the GOP losing power in the House and the Senate. The book talks about the GOP control loss due to what he describes as the Republican Party compromising their conservative principles. He also details what he describes as the betrayal of the vision of Ronald Reagan by the GOP engaging in negative and personal attacks on fellow conservatives, including him. Professor and political science commentator Darrell M. West from Brown University described the book as "vintage Steve Laffey…smart, energetic, and hard-hitting."

Laffey has also written numerous op-ed pieces throughout his career.

- 2009 – "Budget Puts State on Road To Collapse" – Providence Journal
- 2005 – "State Police Must Spare Pristine Land" – Providence Journal
- 2004 – "Why The Rhode Island Taxpayer Revolt Is Spreading" – Providence Journal
- 1985 – What They Do Teach You at Harvard Biz" – Wall Street Journal

=== Film ===
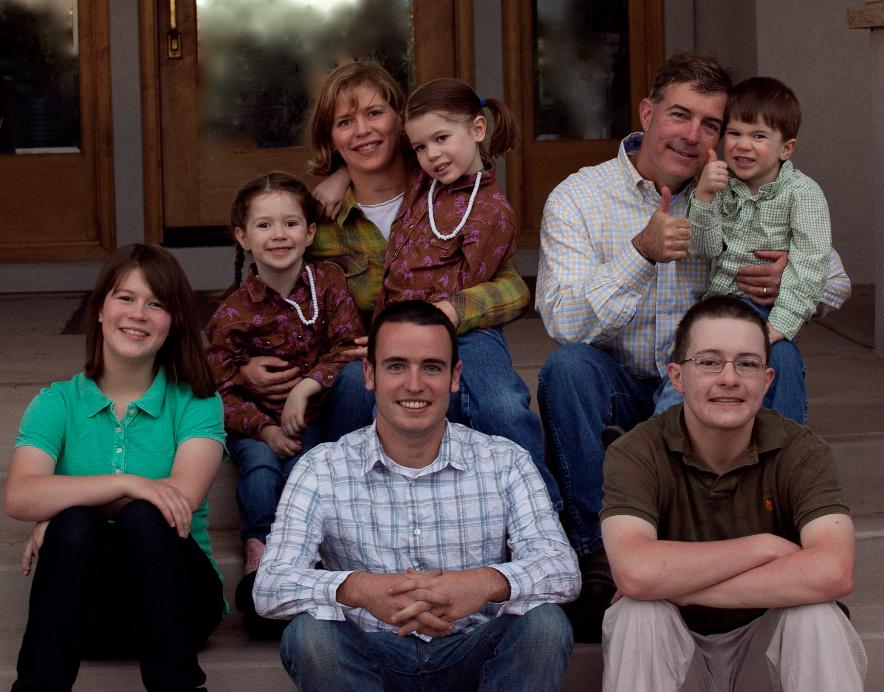
Steve Laffey and family in 2012.

In 2012, Laffey released Fixing America, a documentary film about ordinary Americans and their suggestions on fixing the issues with America's economy and the disconnect with the political elite. The documentary collects their thoughts and emotions as people detail their solutions for these issues. Laffey stated that he was inspired to write the film after attending the Sundance Film Festival with some people who wanted him to start a company with them. He stated that while doing a radio interview at the festival, he listened to someone who was making a movie and the idea to make a movie about fixing America was born. Laffey stated that he learned over the years talking to ordinary people that Americans have better thoughts about fixing the economy than the people who they elect. Laffey was the creator, producer and writer for the film.

== Personal life ==
Still active in politics, Laffey travels across the country for radio show appearances and public speeches. He currently resides in Fort Collins, Colorado, with his wife and six children, raising Irish Dexter cattle and Irish Gypsy Cob horses.

== See also ==
- 2006 United States Senate election in Rhode Island

Political offices
Preceded by John O'Leary	Mayor of Cranston; 2003–2007	Succeeded by Michael Napolitano
