= Judge Shea =

Judge Shea may refer to:

- Edward F. Shea (born 1942), judge of the United States District Court for the Eastern District of Washington
- Michael P. Shea (born 1967), judge of the United States District Court for the District of Connecticut.

== See also ==
- Justice Shea (disambiguation)
