= John P. Bourcier =

American judge (1927–2002)

John Paul Bourcier (March 27, 1927 – August 15, 2002) was a justice of the Rhode Island Supreme Court from 1995 to 2002.

== Biography ==
Born in Providence, Rhode Island, Bourcier served in the U.S. Navy during World War II, and thereafter graduated from Brown University and Vanderbilt University Law School.

After spending two decades as a trial lawyer in private practice, he was appointed as a judge to the Rhode Island Superior Court in 1974 and the Rhode Island Supreme Court in 1995. While on the Superior Court, his decisions were upheld by the state Supreme Court 93% of the time. He gained the nickname "Maximum John" due to his tough criminal sentences, and although he was personally opposed to capital punishment, he handed out the last death sentences imposed in the state in 1976.

== Death ==
Bourcier died of complications from cancer at the age of 75.

Political offices
| Preceded by Donald F. Shea | Justice of the Rhode Island Supreme Court; 1995–2002 | Succeeded by Francis X. Flaherty |
