= Roger N. Begin =

American politician

64th Lieutenant governor of Rhode Island
- In office January 1989 – January 1993
- Governor: Edward D. DiPrete; Bruce Sundlun
- Preceded by: Richard A. Licht
- Succeeded by: Robert Weygand

Member of the Rhode Island House of Representatives
- In office 1973–1984

Personal details
- Born: November 19, 1952 (age 73) Woonsocket, Rhode Island, U.S.
- Party: Democratic
- Education: Community College of Rhode Island; Bryant College
- Occupation: Businessman

Roger Normand Begin (born November 19, 1952) was the lieutenant governor of the U.S. state of Rhode Island from 1989 to 1993.

== Career ==
Begin is a Democrat. He was previously in the Rhode Island House of Representatives from 1973 to 1984.

He is an alumnus of the Community College of Rhode Island.

Party political offices
Preceded by Anthony J. Solomon	Democratic nominee for General Treasurer of Rhode Island; 1984, 1986	Succeeded by Anthony J. Solomon
Preceded by Richard A. Licht	Democratic nominee for Lieutenant Governor of Rhode Island; 1988, 1990	Succeeded by Robert Weygand
Political offices
Preceded by Richard A. Licht	Lieutenant Governor of Rhode Island; 1989–1993	Succeeded by Robert Weygand
