= 2000 United States Senate election in Rhode Island =

- November 7, 2000
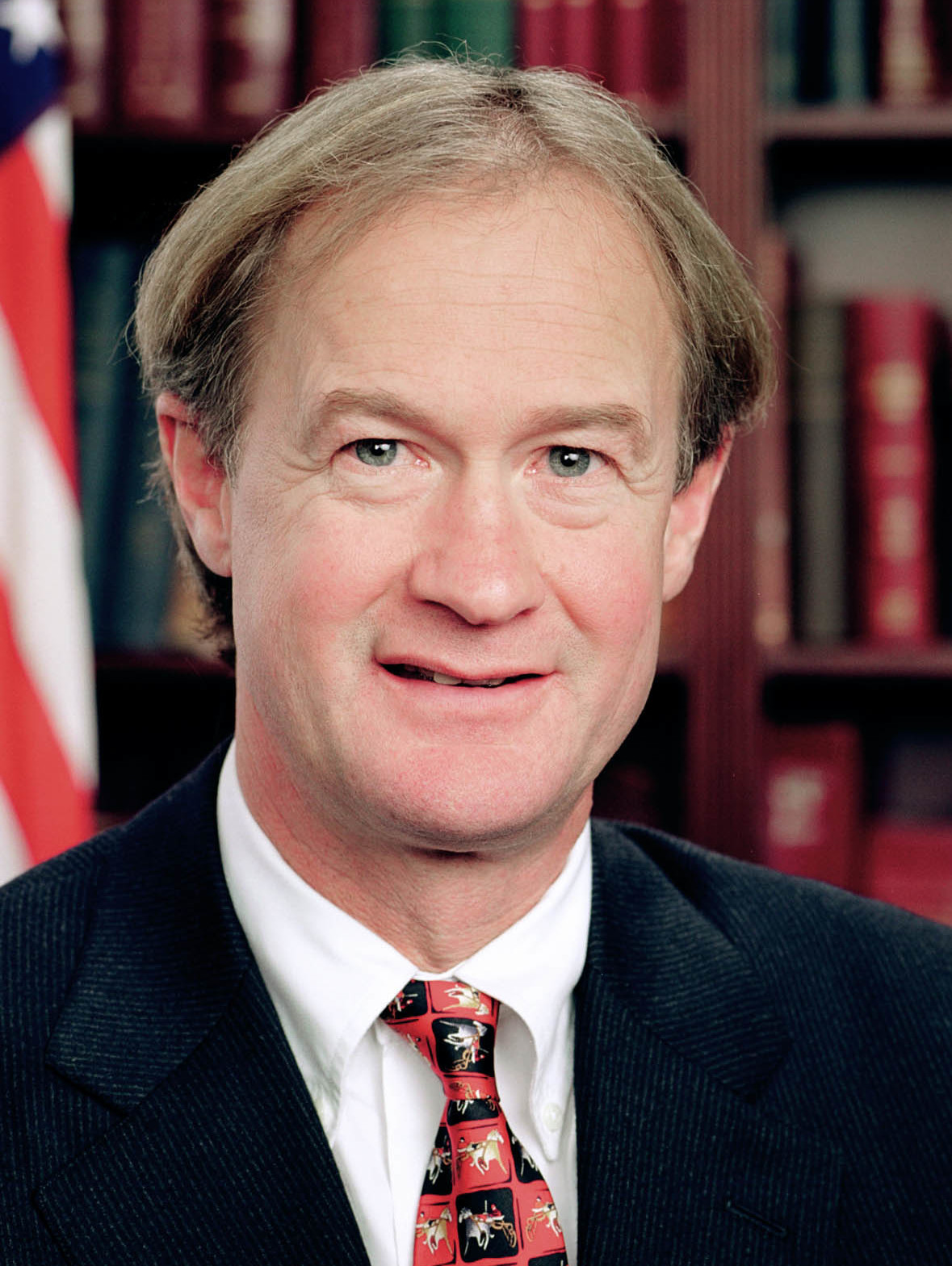

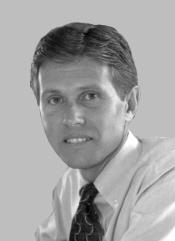
Nominee	Lincoln Chafee	Robert Weygand
Party	Republican	Democratic
Popular vote	222,588	161,023
Percentage	56.88%	41.15%
- Chafee: 40–50% 50–60% 60–70% 70–80% Weygand: 50–60%
U.S. senator before election
Lincoln Chafee (Note: In October 1999, Chafee was appointed by Governor Lincoln Almond to fill the vacancy caused by the death of (his father) Senator John Chafee.)
Republican
Elected U.S. Senator
Lincoln Chafee
Republican

The 2000 United States Senate election in Rhode Island was held on November 7, 2000. Republican incumbent Lincoln Chafee, who had been appointed to replace his late father, John Chafee. The younger Chafee won election to his first full term in office over Democratic congressman Robert Weygand. As of 2026, this is the last Rhode Island congressional election won by a Republican.

== Background ==
At a state and federal level, Rhode Island has been one of the most Democratic states in the country since the 1930s. Nonetheless, Republican senator John Chafee managed to continually win re-election as a moderate Republican.

The elder Chafee announced in March 1999 that he would not seek reelection to a fifth term in office making an open seat, leading his son, Warwick mayor Lincoln Chafee, to announce his own candidacy for the seat. John died in October of that year, leaving the seat vacant. Rhode Island governor Lincoln Almond appointed the younger Chafee to fill the remainder of his father's unexpired term.

== Republican primary ==
=== Candidates ===
- Lincoln Chafee, incumbent U.S. senator since October 1999

=== Results ===
Republican Party primary results
Party	Candidate	Votes	%
Republican	Lincoln Chafee (Incumbent)	2,221	100.00
Total votes		2,221	100.00

== Democratic primary ==
=== Candidates ===
- Richard A. Licht, former Rhode Island lieutenant governor and 1988 Senate nominee
- Robert Weygand, U.S. representative from North Kingstown

=== Results ===
Democratic primary results
Party	Candidate	Votes	%
Democratic	Robert Weygand	51,769	57.49
Democratic	Richard A. Licht	38,281	42.51
Total votes		90,050	100.00

== General election ==
=== Candidates ===
- Lincoln Chafee, incumbent U.S. senator since October 1999 (Republican)
- Kenneth Proulx (Independent)
- Robert Weygand, U.S. representative from North Kingstown (Democratic)
- Christopher Young (Reform)

=== Debates ===
- Complete video of debate, September 24, 2000
- Complete video of debate, November 1, 2000

=== Polling ===
Poll source	Date(s)	Sample size	Margin of error	Lincoln Chafee (R)	Bob Weygand (D)	Other / undecided (Note: Calculated by taking the difference of 100% and all other candidates combined.)
SurveyUSA	October 29, 2000	500	—	59%	33%	8%
Brown University	October 22, 2000	370	—	52%	28%	20%
Rasmussen Reports	October 19, 2000	802	—	52%	35%	13%

=== Results ===
General election results
Party	Candidate	Votes	%	±%
Republican	Lincoln Chafee (Incumbent)	222,588	56.88%	−7.65%
Democratic	Robert Weygand	161,023	41.15%	+5.67%
Reform	Christopher Young	4,107	1.05%	
Independent	Kenneth Proulx	3,635	0.93%	
Majority		61,565	15.73%	−13.32%
Turnout		391,353		
Republican hold		Swing		

==== By county ====
	Lincoln Chafee Republican		Robert A. Weygand Democratic		All Others	
County	Votes	%	Votes	%	Votes	%
Bristol	13,537	61.22%	8,163	36.91%	413	1.87%
Kent	44,714	62.47%	25,593	35.75%	1,274	1.78%
Newport	22,673	63.48%	12,307	34.46%	736	2.06%
Providence	108,904	52.30%	95,193	45.71%	4,249	1.99%
Washington	32,760	61.01%	19,767	36.81%	1,170	2.17%

== See also ==
- 2000 United States Senate elections
