= Francis Flaherty (judge) =

American judge

Associate Justice of the Rhode Island Supreme Court
- In office May 2003 – December 31, 2020
- Appointed by: Donald Carcieri
- Preceded by: John P. Bourcier
- Succeeded by: Melissa A. Long

Mayor of Warwick
- In office 1985–1990
- Preceded by: Joseph W. Walsh
- Succeeded by: Charles D. Donovan

Personal details
- Born: January 8, 1947 (age 79) Providence, Rhode Island, U.S.
- Party: Democratic
- Education: Providence College (BA); Suffolk University (JD)

Francis Xavier Flaherty (born January 8, 1947) is a former Associate Justice of the Rhode Island Supreme Court. Flaherty was appointed to the Supreme Court by Governor Donald Carcieri in 2003. Prior to his service on the Supreme Court, his career included service as a member of the Rhode Island Board of Governors for Higher Education, the mayor of the city of Warwick, and the private practice of law.

Flaherty is a graduate of Suffolk University Law School and Providence College. Between college and law school, he served in the United States Army from 1968 to 1970. His service included deployment to Vietnam where he earned the Bronze Star for Valor as a platoon leader.

After graduating from law school, Flaherty was an Assistant City Solicitor in Warwick from 1975 until 1978. His political career then began with election to the City Council in 1978 and eventual election to three terms as mayor of Warwick serving from 1985 to 1990. He ran unsuccessfully in the Democratic Party Primary for Governor of Rhode Island in 1990 and 1992, though he came narrowly close to victory over the incumbent, Governor Bruce Sundlun, in 1992. In the years after, Flaherty returned to private law practice, served on the Rhode Island Board of Governors for Higher Education from 1998 to 2003, and was appointed to the Supreme Court in 2003.

In October 2020, Flaherty announced his intention to retire on December 31, 2020.

== See also ==
- List of mayors of Warwick, Rhode Island
