= Richard A. Licht =

American politician

Associate Justice of the Rhode Island Superior Court
- Incumbent
- Assumed office August 27, 2014
- Appointed by: Lincoln Chafee

63rd Lieutenant Governor of Rhode Island
- In office January 1985 – January 1989
- Governor: Edward D. DiPrete
- Preceded by: Thomas R. DiLuglio
- Succeeded by: Roger N. Begin

Member of the Rhode Island Senate
- In office 1973–1984

Personal details
- Born: March 25, 1948 (age 78) Providence, Rhode Island, U.S.
- Party: Democratic
- Spouse: Roanne Sragow Licht
- Education: Harvard University (A.B.) Harvard Law School (J.D.)
- Occupation: Judge

Richard A. Licht (born March 25, 1948) is an American judge and lawyer who served as the Lieutenant Governor of the U.S. state of Rhode Island from 1985 to 1989. A Democrat, he previously served in the Rhode Island State Senate from 1973 to 1984. He is an alumnus of Harvard Law School. His uncle, Frank Licht, served as Governor of Rhode Island from 1969 to 1973.

In 2011, Licht was appointed by Gov. Lincoln Chafee as the Director of Administration of Rhode Island.

In 2014, he was appointed as a Rhode Island Superior Court judge. In 2017, he was assigned to the Business Calendar, a specialized business court track within the Superior Court.

In 2023, Licht was struck by a car as a pedestrian near the Rhode Island State House. He sustained serious injuries but made a successful recovery and returned to the bench after six months.

== Early life ==
Richard Licht was born to Julius Licht and Irene Lash Licht in Providence, Rhode Island. He is of Ukrainian Jewish descent. His paternal grandparents were Rochel "Rose" Kassed from Klevan and Jacob Licht from Rivne, and his mother's grandparents emigrated from Kyiv; the family name had originally been Lishinksy. His uncle Frank Licht was the first Jewish governor of Rhode Island.

== Political career ==
Licht made his foray into politics contributing to the gubernatorial campaign of his uncle, Frank Licht.

He was elected to the Rhode Island Senate in 1972, representing the East Side of Providence.

He was elected Lieutenant Governor in 1984, serving under Gov. Edward D. DiPrete.

Licht ran unsuccessful campaigns for United States Senate in the 1988 United States Senate election in Rhode Island, in which he won the Democratic primary, and in the 2000 United States Senate election in Rhode Island.

Licht was a champion of Progressive causes such as reproductive access, paid parental leave, and domestic violence prevention.

== Personal life ==
Richard Licht is a devoted husband and father of four. He is an avid golfer and four-time club champion of Ledgemont Country Club.

Party political offices
Preceded by Julius C. Michaelson	Democratic nominee for U.S. Senator from Rhode Island (Class 1); 1988	Succeeded by Linda Kushner
Political offices
Preceded by Thomas R. DiLuglio	Lieutenant Governor of Rhode Island; 1985–1989	Succeeded by Roger N. Begin
