= Scott Avedisian =

American politician

Mayor of Warwick
- In office 2000–2018
- Preceded by: Lincoln Chafee
- Succeeded by: Joe Solomon

Personal details
- Born: January 16, 1965 (age 61) Warwick, Rhode Island, U.S.
- Party: Republican
- Education: Providence College; Roger Williams University
- Website: Official website

Scott Avedisian (born January 16, 1965) is an American politician and the former Republican mayor of Warwick, Rhode Island, the third largest city in the state after Providence and Cranston.

Avedisian represented Ward 1 in the Warwick City Council from 1990 to 2000, being reelected four times. He was first elected mayor in 2000, and served until 2018. He is the youngest person ever elected as Mayor of Warwick and was the youngest person ever elected to the Warwick City Council. In April 2018, Avedisian announced that he was stepping down from office to become the head of the Rhode Island Public Transit Authority, better known as RIPTA.

Avedisian holds an undergraduate degree from Providence College and a Master of Public Administration degree from Roger Williams University. He also received an honorary degree from the New England Institute of Technology. He is of Armenian descent.

In 2022, Avedisian allegedly lost control of his vehicle and swerved off the road in a one-car accident, hitting a telephone pole in Warwick. He was not charged or cited in that incident.

In 2024, Avedisian pleaded not guilty to leaving the scene of an accident with damage. Witnesses said Avedisian got out of his car after the accident and he seemed “a little intoxicated.”

== See also ==
- List of mayors of Warwick, Rhode Island
