= Thomas R. DiLuglio =

American politician (1931–2024)

62nd Lieutenant Governor of Rhode Island
- In office January 4, 1977 – January 1, 1985
- Governor: J. Joseph Garrahy
- Preceded by: J. Joseph Garrahy
- Succeeded by: Richard A. Licht

Personal details
- Born: November 25, 1931 Providence, Rhode Island, U.S.
- Died: December 18, 2024 (aged 93)
- Party: Democratic
- Education: Brown University; Boston University School of Law
- Occupation: Lawyer

Thomas Ross DiLuglio (November 25, 1931 – December 18, 2024) was an American Democratic politician who was the Lieutenant Governor of Rhode Island from 1977 to 1985. DiLuglio graduated from Classical High School and attended Brown University, where he was a track and field athlete who competed in the high jump, broad jump, javelin, discus, shot put, hurdles, and relay races. He was a member of the Brown University Athletic Hall of Fame (inducted 2004). He later attended the Boston University School of Law and earned a law degree. DiLuglio was a frequent guest on the WSBE-TV political roundtable television show, A Lively Experiment, often comedically sparring with Providence Journal columnist M. Charles Bakst. He wrote a collection of short stories, From Scratch, published in 2003. Born in Providence, Rhode Island, on November 25, 1931, DiLuglio died in December 2024, at the age of 93.

Political offices
Preceded by J. Joseph Garrahy	Lieutenant Governor of Rhode Island; 1977–1985	Succeeded by Richard A. Licht
