= Fixing America =

- DVD cover art
- Directed by: Anthony Ambrosino
- Written by: Steve Laffey
- Produced by: Steve Laffey; Stephen T. Skoly
- Narrated by: Steve Laffey
- Cinematography: Jeffrey M. Hoffman
- Edited by: Fred Tindall
- Music by: Mauro Colangelo
- Production company: Fixing America
- Distributed by: Fixing America
- Release date: March 12, 2012 (United States)
- Running time: 79 minutes
- Country: United States
- Language: English

Fixing America is a 2012 American documentary film written by Steve Laffey and produced with Stephen Skoly. It is a road-documentary in which Americans are asked about the 2008 financial crisis and the disconnect with the political elite. They relate their thoughts, their emotions and especially their solutions to fix America's financial problems.

== Plot ==
Fixing America is a journey across the byways of America interviewing citizens who offer solutions to fix America's problems. Fixing America claims that the "ordinary" American people are those most suited to disentangle problems and crucial issues, saying that they are the ones who deal with complexity everyday, struggling to make ends meet and put their children through college.

In this documentary the interviewees offer simple ideas, without conveying the need for simplicity. They refer to the forefathers, the Constitution, and historical events during America's history. The documentary includes appearances from scholars such as professors Lawrence Kotlikoff, John Friar, and Khalil Habib; journalists such as Dylan Ratigan and Louie Free and activists such as Lew Ward, Grover Norquist, Steve Forbes, Robert Scott, Ned Ryun, and Scott Paul.

== Production ==
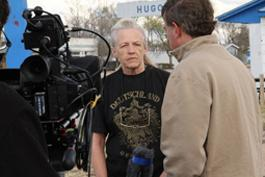

Fixing America was conceived by financial expert Steve Laffey, the two-term former mayor of Cranston, Rhode Island. Laffey improvises himself as a journalist along with a crew of ten, and talent that includes director Anthony Ambrosino, director of photography Jeff Hoffman, editor Fred Tindall, and original music by Mauro Colangelo. Produced by Steve Laffey and creative and business partner Stephen Skoly, the documentary was shot in 18 states and the District of Columbia in April and May 2011, traveling on the back roads and byways of America from Fort Collins, Colorado; to Washington, DC; to New England. Twenty-one independent contractors worked on the film over 10 months in 2011.

The production was self-financed by the executive producers, Steve Skoly and Steve Laffey, and did not accept public money or grants; it had no co-production partners or any associations with broadcasters, production companies or political organizations.

== Background ==
In January 2011, Steve Laffey was working on a media plan for an Internet TV and radio business that would reproduce the quality of direct, one-on-one communication with people he had been able to experience in the last few years during his numerous trips across America. His business plan drew on his interest in establishing a more personal relationship with the American people, meeting them head on and discussing heart-to-heart matters, while sharing ideas.

While drafting the plan, word reached two individuals Laffey had never met, Scott "Boss" Hogg and Barry Hinckley, who invited him to the Sundance Film Festival to talk about it. During an interview with "Boss" and Barry on Revolution Radio, he happened to be sitting next to J. C. Chandor who had just finished making the movie Margin Call. Listening to J. C. Chandor, Laffey believed that making a grassroots documentary film featuring the American people frankly voicing solutions would be a better first step to help fix America.

He contacted Stephen Skoly, producer and founder of JawDoc Productions, who knew Laffey's grassroots background – as evidenced by his campaigns for mayor and the U.S. Senate and as portrayed in Joe Klein's Time magazine article "Running Against the Big Shots" and Laffey's own book, Primary Mistake (Penguin Books 2007) – and was interested in participating in the making of a populist movie, intended to show how regular folks know better than the political elite. Together they formed Fixing America LLC, in Colorado.
