= Robert Weygand =

American politician (born 1948)

Bob Weygand
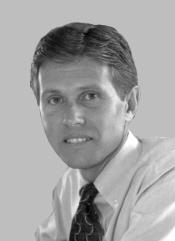

Member of the U.S. House of Representatives from Rhode Island's 2nd district
- In office January 3, 1997 – January 3, 2001
- Preceded by: Jack Reed
- Succeeded by: James Langevin

65th Lieutenant Governor of Rhode Island
- In office January 2, 1993 – January 2, 1997
- Governor: Bruce Sundlun; Lincoln Almond
- Preceded by: Roger Begin
- Succeeded by: Bernard Jackvony

Member of the Rhode Island House of Representatives from the 84th district
- In office January 1985 – January 1993
- Preceded by: Henry Connors
- Succeeded by: Henry Rose

Personal details
- Born: May 10, 1948 (age 78) Attleboro, Massachusetts, U.S.
- Party: Democratic
- Education: University of Rhode Island (BFA, BS, MA, MPA)

Robert A. Weygand (born May 10, 1948) is an American politician. He was a member of the United States House of Representatives from 1997 until 2001. He is a member of the Democratic Party from Rhode Island.

== Life and career ==
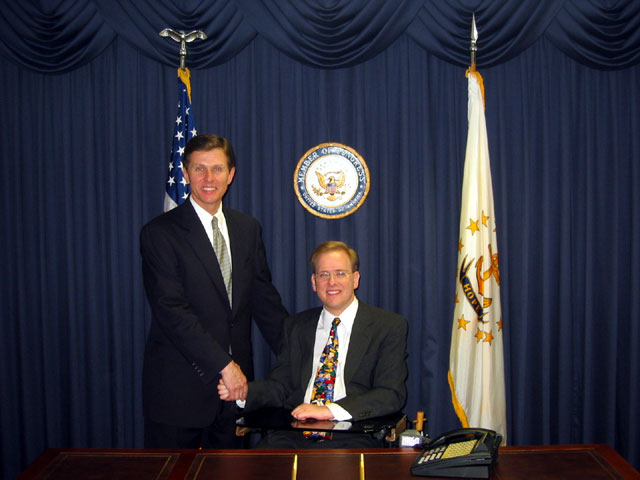
Weygand with Jim Langevin in April 2002

Weygand was born in Attleboro, Massachusetts, to Charles E. Weygand and Lillian M. (Kingsley) Weygand. He attended St. Raphael Academy for his high school years, attended the University of Rhode Island where he became a member of Theta Chi fraternity. He received a Bachelor of Fine Arts in Theater in 1971, a Bachelor of Science in Civil and Environmental Engineering in 1976, a Master of Arts in Political Science in 2009 and a Masters of Public Administration in 2010 all from the University of Rhode Island.

A landscape architect for the Rhode Island Department of Natural Resources from 1973 to 1977, a city planner and landscape architect for an architectural firm from 1977 to 1982, he founded and was president of Weygand, Orchich, & Christie, Inc., an architectural and landscape architectural firm from 1982 to 1993. He was elected a Fellow of the American Society of Landscape Architects in 1998.

In 1991, Weygand, then a state legislator, was offered a $2,000 bribe by then-Pawtucket Mayor Brian J. Sarault. Weygand went to the Rhode Island State Police and the FBI and agreed to deal with the mayor and provide evidence of the bribe. Wearing the listening equipment, Weygand met with Sarault in the mayor's office. After Weygand left, FBI agents burst in and arrested the mayor. The evidence Weygand provided helped send the mayor, several other city officials and private vendors to prison.

Weygand served as chairman of the East Providence Planning Board from 1978 to 1984, a member of the Rhode Island House of Representatives from 1985 to 1993, and as the 65th Lieutenant Governor of Rhode Island from 1993 to 1997. In 1996, he was elected to an open seat in Congress that was being vacated by incoming Senator Jack Reed. Weygand did not seek re-election to the United States House of Representatives in 2000, opting to challenge Republican Senator Lincoln Chafee. Weygand, an anti-abortion Democrat, lost the election to Chafee, who enjoyed popularity among Rhode Island Democrats as one of the most liberal Republicans elected to national office.

In 2001, Weygand was appointed President of the New England Board of Higher Education in Boston. In 2004, he stepped down at NEBHE to take a new position as Vice President for Administration at the University of Rhode Island.

== References and external links ==
- Weygand leaving URI post with $51,707 payment for unused vacation days, providencejournal.com; accessed April 18, 2018.
- United States Congress. "Robert Weygand (id: W000315)". Biographical Directory of the United States Congress.

== Sources ==
- Appearances on C-SPAN

Political offices
Preceded by Roger Begin	Lieutenant Governor of Rhode Island; 1993–1997	Succeeded by Bernard Jackvony
U.S. House of Representatives
Preceded by Jack Reed	Member of the U.S. House of Representatives from Rhode Island's 2nd congressional district 1997–2001	Succeeded by James Langevin
U.S. order of precedence (ceremonial)
Preceded by Kathy Manning as Former U.S. Representative	Order of precedence of the United States as Former U.S. Representative	Succeeded by Martin Hoke as Former U.S. Representative
