= 1988 United States Senate election in Rhode Island =

- November 8, 1988
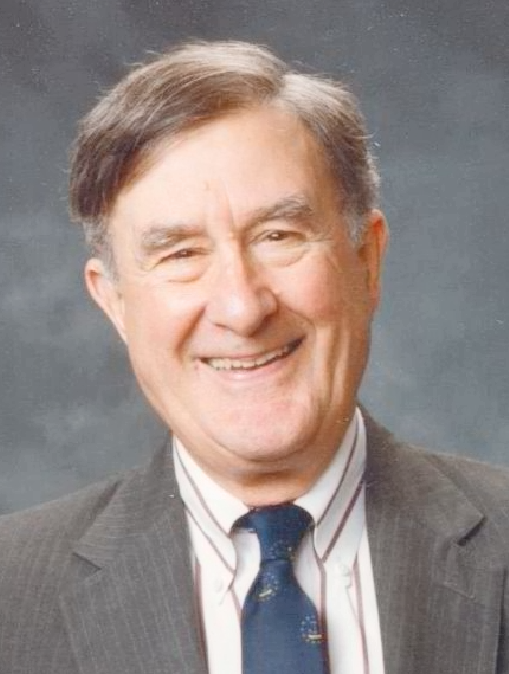

Nominee	John Chafee	Richard Licht
Party	Republican	Democratic
Popular vote	217,273	180,717
Percentage	54.59%	45.41%
- Chafee: 50–60% 60–70% 70–80% Licht: 50–60% 60–70%
U.S. senator before election
John Chafee
Republican
Elected U.S. Senator
John Chafee
Republican

The 1988 United States Senate election in Rhode Island was held on November 8, 1988. Incumbent Republican U.S. Senator John Chafee won re-election to a third term.

== Major candidates ==
=== Democratic ===
- Richard Licht, Lieutenant Governor and former State Senator

=== Republican ===
- John Chafee, U.S. Senator since 1976

== Results ==
Chafee defeated Licht by a wide margin, winning every county in the state with 55% of the vote. This was despite 56% of Rhode Island voting for Democratic nominee Michael Dukakis in the concurrent presidential election. Many voters therefore split their tickets.

General election results
Party	Candidate	Votes	%	±%
Republican	John Chafee (Incumbent)	217,273	54.59%	+3.39%
Democratic	Richard Licht	180,717	45.41%	−3.39%
Majority		36,556	9.19%	+6.79%
Turnout		397,990		
Republican hold		Swing		

== See also ==
- 1988 United States Senate elections
