= Donald F. Shea =

American judge (1925–2019)

Donald Francis Shea (September 14, 1925 – August 14, 2019) was a state legislator, assistant to the governor, and justice of the Rhode Island Supreme Court from 1981 to 1995.

== Career ==
Born in Pawtucket, Rhode Island, Shea received an undergraduate degree from Providence College in 1950 and then a law degree from Georgetown University School of Law. He served in the United States Navy from 1943 to 1946.

Shea was elected to the Rhode Island House of Representatives from East Providence and served from 1960 until 1968. He was Deputy Majority Leader from 1966 until 1968. He was Assistant to Governor Frank Licht from 1969 until 1972. He was appointed to the Superior Court as an Associate Justice on September 8, 1972.

Named to the state supreme court in 1981, he authored over 500 opinions before his retirement in 1995. In retirement, he served as a mediator on Supreme Court appellate cases.

== Personal life and death ==
Shea married Ursula Rafferty, with whom he had five children.

He died in Providence at the age of 93.

Political offices
Preceded by John F. Doris	Justice of the Rhode Island Supreme Court; 1981–1995	Succeeded by John P. Bourcier
