= 2006 United States Senate election in Rhode Island =

- November 7, 2006

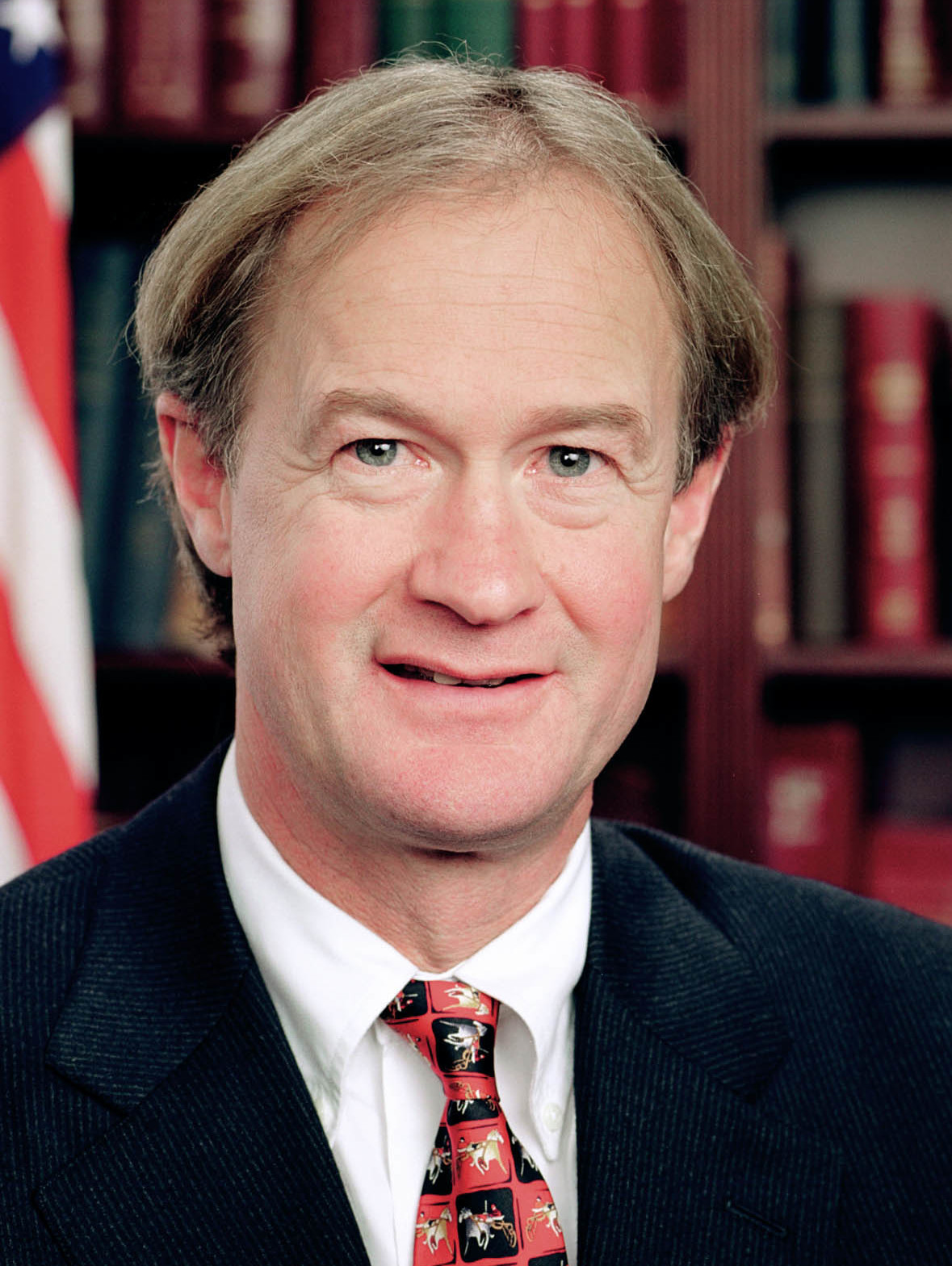
Nominee	Sheldon Whitehouse	Lincoln Chafee
Party	Democratic	Republican
Popular vote	206,109	179,001
Percentage	53.52%	46.48%
- Whitehouse: 50–60% 60–70% 70–80% Chafee: 50–60% 60–70%
U.S. senator before election
Lincoln Chafee
Republican
Elected U.S. Senator
Sheldon Whitehouse
Democratic

The 2006 United States Senate election in Rhode Island was held on November 7, 2006. Republican incumbent Lincoln Chafee sought re-election to a second full term in office but was defeated by former Rhode Island attorney general Sheldon Whitehouse.

Primary elections were held on September 12. Chafee, who faced criticism from Republican activists for his liberal positions on the issues, survived a challenge from Cranston mayor Steve Laffey, who ran as an anti-tax conservative. Many Republicans supported Chafee over electability concerns, believing that he would be more likely to hold the seat in the November election. In the Democratic primary, Whitehouse easily defeated more progressive challengers after secretary of state Matt Brown withdrew from the race.

Along with Maine and Pennsylvania, this was one of the three Republican-held Senate seats up for election in a state that John Kerry won in the 2004 presidential election. After the primaries, Whitehouse consistently led in public opinion polling, and he defeated Chafee by over seven percentage points. After the election, when asked by a reporter if he thought his defeat would help the country by giving Democrats control of Congress, Chafee replied, "to be honest, yes." Chafee soon left the Republican Party.

As of 2026, this is the last time a Republican candidate won Bristol and Washington counties in a statewide election. Whitehouse was the first Democratic senator elected to this seat since John Pastore in 1970, and the Democratic Party held both Rhode Island seats for the first time since Pastore left office in 1977. Chafee was elected governor of Rhode Island as an independent in 2010; he ran unsuccessfully for president of the United States in the 2016 Democratic Party primaries.

== Republican primary ==
=== Candidates ===
- Lincoln Chafee, incumbent U.S. senator since 1999
- Steve Laffey, mayor of Cranston

=== Campaign ===
By 2006, Lincoln Chafee was considered one of the most liberal members of the Republican Party in the Senate and he drew a primary challenge from Cranston mayor Steve Laffey. In early 2006, the Club for Growth sent a series of mailings to Republicans in the state attacking Chafee's voting record.

The national Republican Party supported Chafee, believing that he was more likely to hold the seat in the general election. Senators Mitch McConnell and John McCain and First Lady Laura Bush appeared at fundraisers for Chafee, while Bill Frist's PAC donated to Chafee. The National Republican Senatorial Committee (NRSC) also ran ads in the state supporting Chafee. Laffey picked up endorsements from many local Republican town committees throughout Rhode Island, the national group Club for Growth, and former presidential candidate Steve Forbes. On July 10, the NRSC filed a complaint against Laffey with the Federal Election Commission, claiming that he had included a political communication with tax bills mailed to Cranston residents.

=== Debates ===
- Complete video of debate, August 23, 2006 - C-SPAN
- Complete video of debate, August 26, 2006 - C-SPAN

=== Polling ===
Source	Date	Lincoln Chafee	Steve Laffey
Rhode Island College	April 2006	56%	28%
American Research Group	May 5, 2006	48%	39%
Club for Growth/National Research Inc.	June 2, 2006	45%	44%
Rhode Island College	June 2006	39%	38%
Rhode Island College	August 28–30, 2006	34%	51%
RNSC/Public Opinion Strategies	August 30, 2006	53%	39%

=== Results ===
Results by county: Chafee—50–60% Laffey—50–60%

Republican primary results
Party	Candidate	Votes	%
Republican	Lincoln Chafee (incumbent)	34,936	54.18
Republican	Steve Laffey	29,547	45.82
Total votes		64,483	100.00

== Democratic primary ==
=== Candidates ===
- Carl Sheeler, Marine veteran
- Sheldon Whitehouse, former Rhode Island attorney general and U.S. attorney for the District of Rhode Island
- Christopher F. Young, activist and perennial candidate

==== Withdrew ====
- Matt Brown, Rhode Island secretary of state (endorsed Whitehouse)

=== Campaign ===
Whitehouse was endorsed by Senator Jack Reed and U.S. representatives Jim Langevin and Patrick J. Kennedy. Sheeler, a former U.S. Marine, ran on a more progressive platform.

=== Results ===
Ultimately, Whitehouse would trounce his competition in the primary, winning his party's support by a large margin.

Democratic primary results
Party	Candidate	Votes	%
Democratic	Sheldon Whitehouse	69,290	81.53
Democratic	Christopher F. Young	8,939	10.52
Democratic	Carl Sheeler	6,755	7.95
Total votes		84,984	100.00

== General election ==
=== Candidates ===
- Lincoln Chafee, incumbent U.S. senator since 1999 (Republican)
- Sheldon Whitehouse, former Rhode Island attorney general (Democratic)

=== Campaign ===
Democrats believed that this was one of the most likely Senate seats to switch party control, due to the Democratic tilt of Rhode Island, as well as Chafee's need to expend part of his campaign fund to win the Republican primary election. Chafee's approval ratings also took a beating from his primary battle with Laffey and may have hurt him in the general election. Another factor that hurt Chafee was that Whitehouse, the Democratic nominee, had a huge head start on him, as he was able to campaign with little opposition for at least half the year and had not had to contend with a major opponent until the general election campaign. Rhode Islanders' historically large disapproval ratings for President George W. Bush and the Republican Party as a whole was another major hurdle for Chafee.

=== Debates ===
- Complete video of debate, October 19, 2006 - C-SPAN
- Complete video of debate, October 30, 2006 - C-SPAN

=== Issues ===
Whitehouse and Chafee did not have large differences on political issues. On social issues, they were almost entirely in agreement with each other. Chafee was also against the Bush tax cuts. On fiscal issues, such as social security and trade, they were however in disagreement.

- Abortion
  - Chafee - pro-choice
  - Whitehouse - pro-choice
- Stem-Cell research
  - Chafee - support
  - Whitehouse - support
- Death penalty
  - Chafee - strongly opposes
  - Whitehouse - support in federal level, but not in state level
- Gay Marriage
  - Chafee - supports
  - Whitehouse - supports
- Privatizing Social Security
  - Chafee - Partially Supports
  - Whitehouse - Strongly Against
- Bush Tax Cuts
  - Chafee - Strongly against
  - Whitehouse - Strongly against
- Vouchers
  - Chafee - rated 55% by NEA, representing a mixed record
  - Whitehouse - Strongly against
- Federal Spending on Health Care
  - Chafee - Strongly supports
  - Whitehouse - Strongly supports
- PATRIOT Act
  - Chafee - supports
  - Whitehouse - against
- Free Trade
  - Chafee - supports
  - Whitehouse - against

=== Predictions ===
Source	Ranking	As of
The Cook Political Report	Tossup	November 6, 2006
Sabato's Crystal Ball	Lean D (flip)	November 6, 2006
Rothenberg Political Report	Lean D (flip)	November 6, 2006
Real Clear Politics	Tossup	November 6, 2006

=== Polling ===
Source	Date	Sheldon Whitehouse (D)	Lincoln Chafee (R)
Brown University	September 13, 2005	25%	38%
Brown University	February 8, 2006	34%	40%
Rasmussen	February 11, 2006	38%	50%
Rhode Island College	April 2006	32%	51%
Rasmussen	May 4, 2006	41%	44%
Rasmussen	June 5, 2006	42%	44%
Rhode Island College	June 21, 2006	40%	43%
Brown University	June 26, 2006	38%	37%
Rasmussen	July 18, 2006	46%	41%
Rasmussen	August 9, 2006	44%	38%
Fleming & Associates	August 24, 2006	42%	43%
Rasmussen	September 3, 2006	44%	42%
Rasmussen	September 17, 2006	51%	43%
Brown University	September 16–18, 2006	40%	39%
American Research Group	September 19, 2006	45%	40%
Mason-Dixon/MSNBC	October 2, 2006	42%	41%
Reuters/Zogby	October 5, 2006	45%	41%
USA Today/Gallup	October 6, 2006	50%	39%
Rasmussen	October 10, 2006	49%	39%
Rhode Island College	October 10, 2006	40%	37%
Fleming & Associates	October 19, 2006	46%	42%
Rasmussen	October 19, 2006	50%	42%
Mason-Dixon/MSNBC	October 24, 2006	48%	43%
Rhode Island College	October 27, 2006	51%	43%
Reuters/Zogby	November 2, 2006	53%	39%
Mason-Dixon/MSNBC	November 5, 2006	45%	46%
USA Today/Gallup	November 5, 2006	48%	45%

Hypothetical polling

with Steve Laffey

Source	Date	Sheldon Whitehouse (D)	Steve Laffey (R)
Brown University	September 13, 2005	35%	25%
Brown University	February 8, 2006	44%	29%
Brown University	June 26, 2006	55%	25%

=== Results ===
Whitehouse defeated Chafee in his bid for a second full term. Whitehouse carried only Providence County, which contained approximately 60 percent of the state's population, by 18 percent of the vote. His victory there was enough to win the state.

United States Senate election in Rhode Island, 2006
Party	Candidate	Votes	%	±%
Democratic	Sheldon Whitehouse	206,043	53.52%	+12.37%
Republican	Lincoln Chafee (incumbent)	178,950	46.48%	−10.40%
Total votes		384,993	100.00%	N/A
Democratic gain from Republican				

==== By county ====
	Sheldon Whitehouse Democratic		Lincoln Chafee Republican		Others	
County	Votes	%	Votes	%	Votes	%
Bristol	10,435	49.6%	10,554	50.1%	66	0.3%
Kent	34,349	47.1%	38,370	52.6%	240	0.3%
Newport	16,609	49.2%	17,050	50.5%	114	0.3%
Providence	119,618	58.9%	82,679	40.7%	682	0.3%
Washington	25,098	45.1%	30,348	54.6%	152	0.3%

==== Counties that flipped from Republican to Democratic ====
- Providence (largest municipality: Providence)

== See also ==
- 2006 United States Senate elections
