= Lincoln Chafee =

American politician (born 1953)

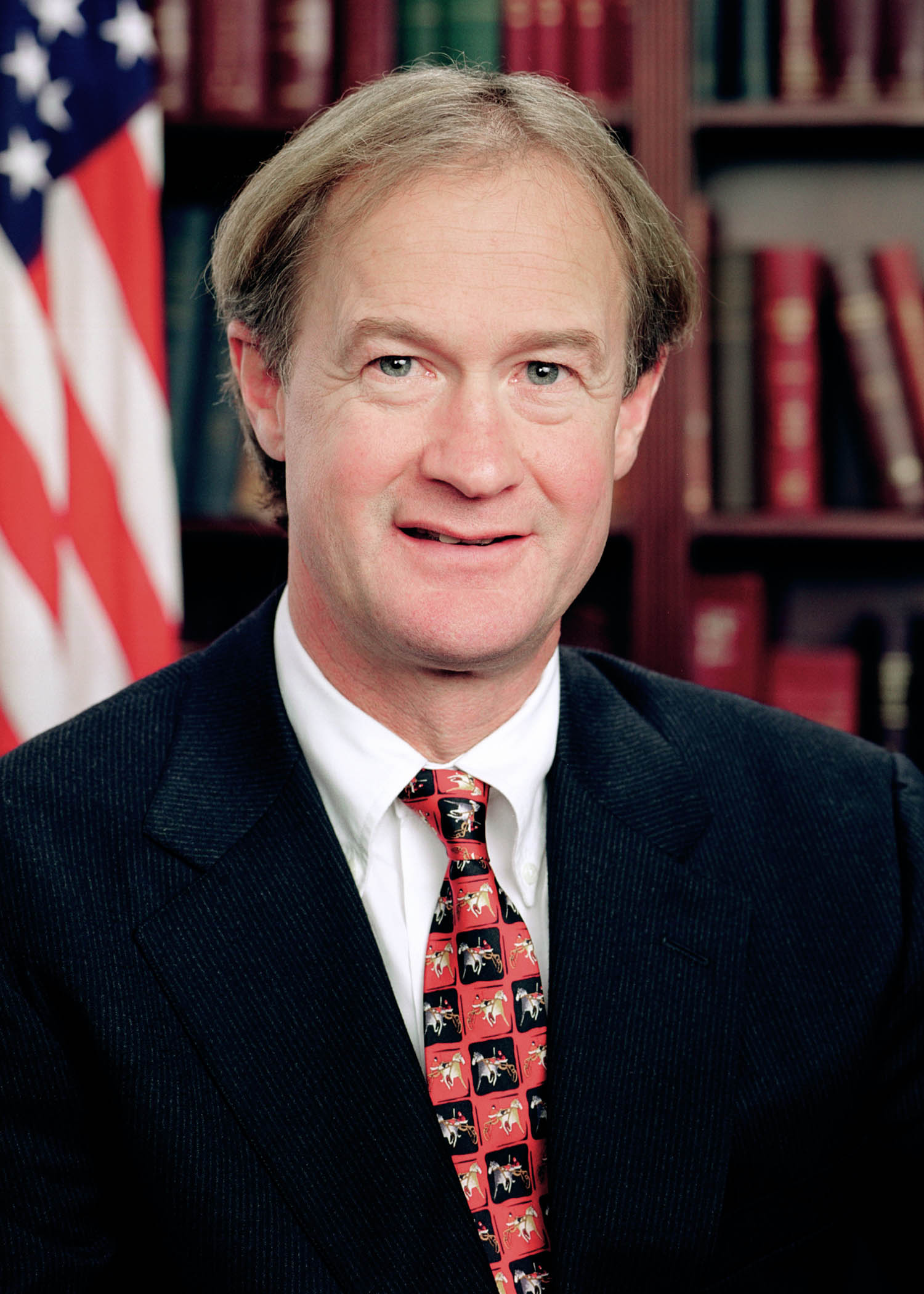
- Official portrait, 2003

74th Governor of Rhode Island
- In office January 4, 2011 – January 6, 2015
- Lieutenant: Elizabeth Roberts
- Preceded by: Donald Carcieri
- Succeeded by: Gina Raimondo

United States Senator from Rhode Island
- In office November 2, 1999 – January 3, 2007
- Preceded by: John Chafee
- Succeeded by: Sheldon Whitehouse

Mayor of Warwick
- In office January 1, 1993 – November 1, 1999
- Preceded by: Charles Donovan
- Succeeded by: Scott Avedisian

Personal details
- Born: Lincoln Davenport Chafee; March 26, 1953 (age 73) Providence, Rhode Island, U.S.
- Party: Republican (before 2007); Independent (2007–2013); Democratic (2013–2019); Libertarian (2019–present)
- Spouse: Stephanie Birney Danforth (m. 1990)
- Children: 3, including Louisa
- Parent: John Chafee (father)
- Education: Brown University (BA)
- Chafee's voice Chafee supporting a PAYGO-related amendment to the FY2006 budget resolution. Recorded March 16, 2005

Lincoln Davenport Chafee (/ˈtʃeɪfiː/ CHAY-fee; born March 26, 1953) is an American politician who served as the 74th governor of Rhode Island from 2011 to 2015 and as a United States senator from 1999 to 2007. Previously, he served as mayor of Warwick, Rhode Island, from 1993 to 1999. A member of the Libertarian Party since 2019, he previously was a Republican until 2007, an independent from 2007 to 2013, and a Democrat from 2013 to 2019. He is the last non-Democrat to hold statewide or Congressional office in Rhode Island.

The son of Republican politician John Chafee, who was the 66th governor of Rhode Island, the United States secretary of the navy, and a U.S. senator, the younger Chafee first held elected office as a member of the Warwick City Council in 1985. After his father's death in 1999, Chafee was appointed to his seat in the U.S. Senate, to which he won a full term in 2000.

Chafee was the only Republican in the Senate to vote against authorization of the use of force in Iraq in the lead-up to the Iraq War. He was defeated in his 2006 reelection bid by Democrat Sheldon Whitehouse. Chafee subsequently shifted his affiliation towards the Democratic Party by first endorsing Barack Obama in the 2008 presidential election, running as an independent for governor of Rhode Island in 2010, serving as the co-chair of Obama's 2012 re-election campaign, and then officially switching his registration to the Democratic Party in May 2013. In March 2019, he joined the Libertarian Party.

In 2015, he sought nomination to become the Democratic candidate in the 2016 presidential election, but withdrew prior to the primaries. In January 2020, Chafee filed to run again for president, this time seeking the Libertarian nomination. Chafee withdrew his candidacy on April 5, 2020, and announced he would instead focus on helping "other Libertarians seeking office."

== Early life, education, and career ==
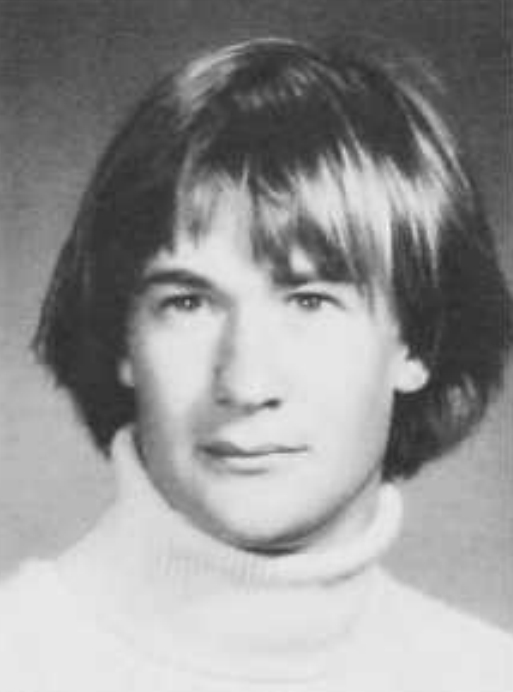
Chafee in the Brown University yearbook, 1975

Lincoln Davenport Chafee was born on March 26, 1953, in Providence, Rhode Island, the son of Virginia (née Coates) and John Chafee. Chafee's great-great-grandfather Henry Lippitt was Governor of Rhode Island. Among his great-great-uncles are Rhode Island Governor Charles Warren Lippitt and United States Senator Henry Frederick Lippitt. His great-uncle Zechariah Chafee was a Harvard law professor and a notable civil libertarian. The Chafee family was among the earliest settlers of Hingham, Massachusetts, before moving south to Rhode Island.

He attended public schools in Warwick, Rhode Island, Providence Country Day School, as well as, later, Phillips Academy. At Brown University, Chafee captained the wrestling team, and in 1975 earned a Bachelor of Arts in classics. He then attended Montana State University's non-degree Farrier School (a sixteen-week horseshoeing program) in Bozeman. For the next seven years, he worked as a farrier at harness racetracks in the United States and Canada. One of the horses he shod, Overburden, set the track record at Northlands Park in Edmonton. In describing how his time as a farrier affected him, Chafee stated that "when you're around horses, you tend to be a quieter person."

== Local politics (1985–1999) ==
Chafee entered politics in 1985, when he was elected over eight other candidates to become delegate to the Rhode Island Constitutional Convention. A year later, he was elected to the Warwick City Council, defeating an incumbent, and re-elected in 1988. He ran for Warwick Mayor in 1990, losing by 5 percent in a three-way race.

In 1992, he was elected Warwick's first Republican mayor in 32 years, and was re-elected in 1994, 1996, and 1998, when he won by 17% and carried all nine wards.

Chafee was praised for his fair-minded and sensible approach to government, including his ability to work with seven Democrats (of nine seats) on the Warwick City Council. He conservatively managed the city's finances, strengthening the city's bond rating and paying down the outstanding pension liability.

He worked effectively and cooperatively with the municipal unions, especially in settling a difficult and prolonged teacher labor dispute that he inherited from the previous administration.

As mayor, Chafee made conservation, environmental protection, and wise growth a priority. He purchased 130 acres of open space, planted hundreds of street trees, and created new historic districts and a new economic development "intermodal" district at the state airport. His municipal composting and recycling initiatives dramatically decreased landfill waste. His "Greenwich Bay Initiative", which extended sewer service to the most environmentally-sensitive areas of the city, earned Warwick recognition by EPA as one of the best local watershed programs in the nation.

== U.S. Senate (1999–2007) ==
=== Elections ===
==== 2000 ====
After his father John announced he would not seek re-election in 2000, Lincoln Chafee announced he would run for the seat. When the elder Chafee died suddenly in October 1999, Governor Lincoln Almond appointed the younger Chafee to serve out the term.

In the general election he faced the Democratic nominee, then-U.S. Representative Robert Weygand. Chafee won the election 57%–41%.

==== 2006 ====
In September 2005, Steve Laffey, the mayor of Cranston, Rhode Island, announced his intention to run against Chafee in the Republican primary election. Among other stances differing from those of Chafee, Mayor Laffey opposed abortion and stem cell research. Laffey was supported by notable conservative groups, including the Club for Growth and several anti-abortion groups. Chafee went on to defeat Laffey in the primary on September 12 by a margin of 53%–47%. The turnout for the Republican primary was the largest in Rhode Island history. In his victory speech, Chafee credited independent voters and disaffiliated Democrats for his victory.

Chafee lost to Whitehouse in the general election, 54%–46%. In response to a question at a news conference on November 9, 2006, Chafee stated he was unsure whether he would remain in the Republican Party after serving out the remainder of his term. According to Michelle R. Smith of the Associated Press, when asked whether he felt that his loss may have helped the country by switching control of power in Congress (away from Republicans and toward the Democrats), he replied: "To be honest, yes."

=== Tenure ===
Descended from a long line of moderate, center-right New England Republicans, Chafee's stances became increasingly liberal, more so than his father's positions had been. The now dominant conservatives referred to him as a "Republican In Name Only", or RINO. Most notable among these was Human Events magazine, which named Chafee "the No. 1 RINO in the country." In 2006, the National Journal rated Chafee as the most liberal Republican in the Senate, and placed him to the left of two Democrats, Nebraska's Ben Nelson and Louisiana's Mary Landrieu. GovTrack also ranked Senator Chafee as the most liberal Republican member in 2006; according to GovTrack's analysis, Chafee was to the left of his Republican colleagues as well as to the left of fourteen Democrats.

Known for often disagreeing with the Republican Party leadership, Chafee says he did not cast his ballot for President George W. Bush in the 2004 election, instead choosing to write in former president George H. W. Bush as a nod to the Republican Party of his father. Chafee frequently criticized the younger Bush's record on the environment, and expressed concern about the 2004 Republican platform and overall philosophical direction of the party. He described the younger Bush's presidency as "an agenda of energizing the far-right-wing base, which is divisive." Soon thereafter, he rejected Democratic overtures to leave the Republican Party after appeals to him from other Republican senators to remain in their caucus. Chafee considered challenging George W. Bush for re-nomination in the New Hampshire primary in 2004 on an anti- (Iraq and Afghanistan) war platform. In his autobiography, Against the Tide (2007), he states that "In the fall of 2003, part of me thought it was cowardly to oppose the president on so many issues and then not oppose him head-on as he sought renomination." However, he decided not to run after the capture of Saddam Hussein on December 13, 2003.

==== Fiscal policy ====
Chafee also voted against both the 2001 and 2003 congressional budget bills that cut and/or rebated individuals' federal income taxes. He asserted that tax cuts reduce revenue to the federal government, thereby worsening the federal budget deficit and increasing the amount of money it has to borrow in order to operate. In 2004, Chafee broke with his party again to oppose the acceleration of the Bush tax cuts. "Four Senate moderates -- John McCain of Arizona, Olympia J. Snowe and Susan Collins, both of Maine, and Lincoln Chafee of Rhode Island -- had insisted on attaching a provision that would have applied pay-as-you-go-rules for the next five years."

On November 17, 2005, he voted in favor of reinstating the top federal income tax rate of 39.6% (which last existed under President Bill Clinton in the 1990s) on the highest-income taxpayers.

In 2003, Chafee voted against the Medicare Part D prescription drug expansion. However, Chafee also cast a crucial procedural vote against a Democratic attempt to kill that bill, which failed by only two votes. Chafee also co-sponsored the Class Action Fairness Act of 2005, which expanded federal jurisdiction over class-action lawsuits, and voted against a wholesale ban on gifts from employees of lobbying companies.

The Cato Institute's Center for Trade Policy Studies identified Chafee as a "free trader" during his U.S. Senate tenure, indicating a pro-free trade, pro-market, and anti-subsidies voting record. Chafee has supported free trade agreements (e.g., North American Free Trade Agreement and Dominican Republic-Central America Free Trade Agreement (CAFTA) and bankruptcy reform.

As U.S. Senator from Rhode Island, Chafee received grades of D in 2000, C− in 2001, C in 2002, C− in 2003 and 2004, and D in 2005 and 2006 from the National Taxpayers Union, a conservative taxpayers advocacy organization.

==== Environment ====
Chafee was one of the few Republicans to vote against allowing drilling in the Arctic National Wildlife Refuge, and was a member of the Republicans for Environmental Protection. He has been endorsed throughout his career by the Sierra Club and the League of Conservative Voters as a strong leader for environmental causes, despite criticisms from other progressive activist groups decrying the endorsement of a (then) Republican.

Chafee sponsored the Small Business Liability Relief and Brownfields Revitalization Act of 2002, enabling the clean up and redevelopment of thousands of abandoned urban buildings throughout the United States.

==== Social policy ====
Chafee was a member of the Republican Majority for Choice and Republicans for Choice. Chafee was also a member of the Republican Main Street Partnership.

Chafee is pro-choice. In 2003, Chafee was one of the three Republican Senators to oppose the Partial-Birth Abortion Ban Act. His 2006 senatorial re-election bid was endorsed by NARAL Pro-Choice America. He also supported federal funding for embryonic stem cell research.

In 2004, Chafee was one of six Republicans to vote against the Federal Marriage Amendment, an amendment intended to ban gay marriage; in 2006, he voted against banning gay marriage a second time. During his tenure, Chafee was the only sitting or former Republican senator to support the legalization of same-sex marriage, until Rob Portman of Ohio endorsed it in 2013.

He supported affirmative action and gun control, and was one of only two Republicans to vote against the Protection of Lawful Commerce in Arms Act (which prevents firearms manufacturers and dealers from being held liable for crimes committed with their products). On June 27, 2006, Chafee was one of only three Republicans to vote against the proposed Flag Desecration Amendment.

Chafee opposes the death penalty, and has consistently voted against limiting death penalty appeals in federal cases. He has also favored including racial statistics in death penalty appeals, and making DNA analysis a prerequisite for any federal-level, criminal executions.

On May 23, 2005, Chafee was one of 14 bipartisan senators to forge a compromise on the Democrats' use of the judicial filibuster, forestalling the Republican leadership's implementation of the so-called "nuclear option". Under the agreement, the Democrats would retain the power to filibuster a Bush II judicial nominee only in an "extraordinary circumstance", and three of the most conservative Bush appellate court nominees (Janice Rogers Brown, Priscilla Owen and William Pryor) would receive a vote by the full Senate. Chafee was the only Republican to oppose George W. Bush's nomination of Samuel Alito to the United States Supreme Court. However, he voted to end debate on the nomination, helping to end any chance of a Democratic filibuster of it. Chafee did not announce his opposition to the nomination until a majority of Senators had already publicly said they would support Alito.

==== Foreign policy ====
Chafee was the only Republican in the Senate to vote against authorization of the use of force in Iraq in the lead-up to the Iraq War. On June 22, 2006, he was the only Republican to vote for the Levin amendment calling for a nonbinding timetable for a withdrawal of US troops from Iraq. Chafee voted against the Kerry-Feingold amendment calling for a binding timetable.

Chafee is now involved in J Street, a liberal Jewish group that calls for Israel to withdraw from all occupied territories and advocates for a "two state" solution to the Arab–Israeli conflict.

In November 2006, immediately following the midterm elections, Chafee joined key Democrats in opposing President Bush's renomination of John Bolton as United States Ambassador to the United Nations. On December 4, 2006, the White House announced that Bolton would no longer seek the appointment, and would resign within a matter of weeks.

==== Committee assignments ====
- U.S. Senate Committee on Foreign Relations
- U.S. Senate Committee on Environment and Public Works
- U.S. Senate Committee on Homeland Security and Governmental Affairs

== Political hiatus (2007–2009) ==
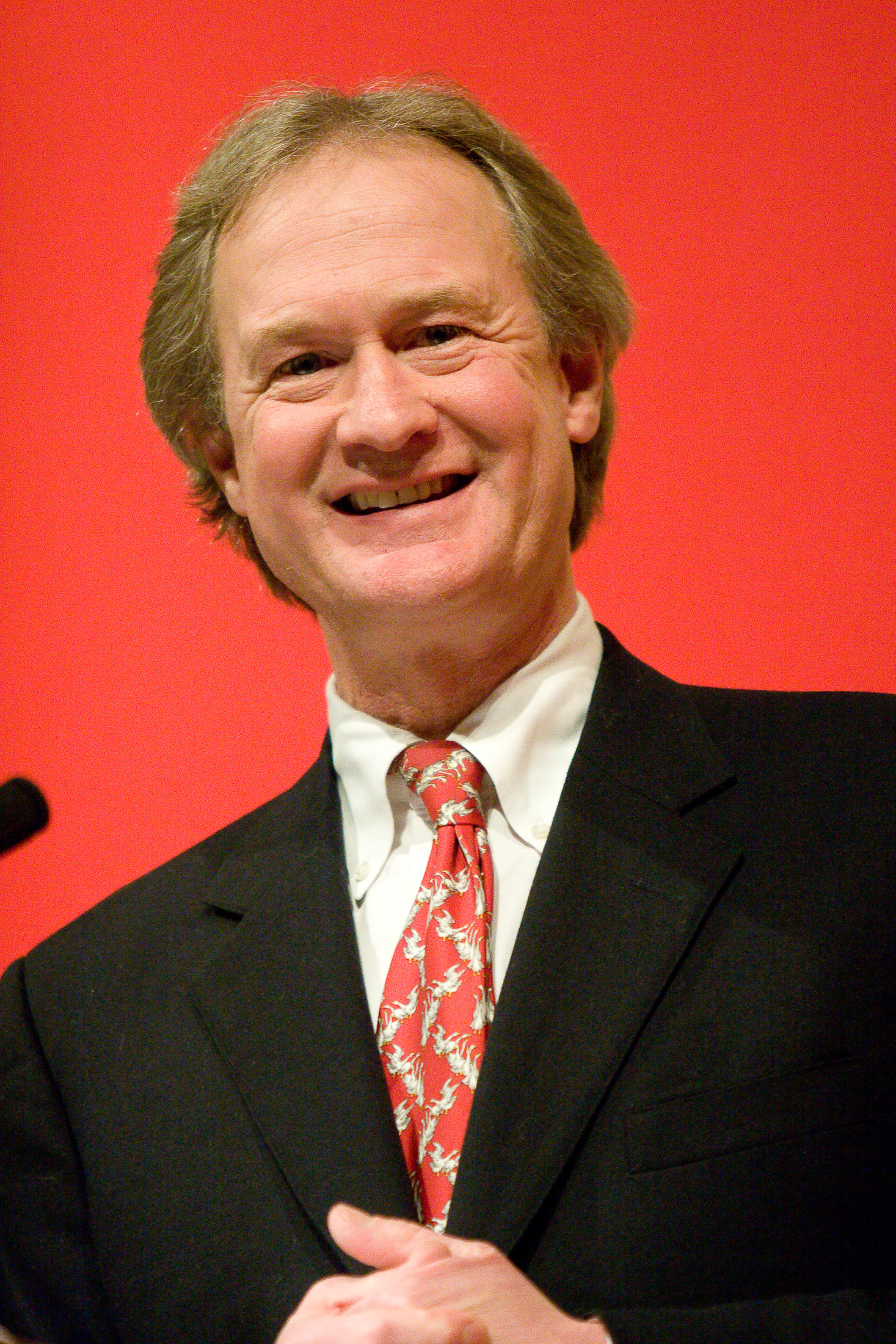
Lincoln Chafee delivers a lecture during his time at Brown University in 2007

In December 2006, Chafee announced he was accepting a fellowship to serve as a "distinguished visiting fellow" at Brown University's Thomas J. Watson Jr. Institute for International Studies. The university had Chafee lead a student group studying U.S. foreign policy.

In September 2007, Chafee officially left the Republican Party, changing his affiliation to Independent. He said that he did so because of the Republican Party's drifting away from its core values, such as its abandoning fiscal conservatism. Citing the party's new tendency to pass tax cuts without spending cuts to balance the loss of revenue, he noted how the party was destroying social programs aimed to help middle-class and lower-income Americans, particularly Pell Grants and Head Start. In February 2008, he said he was considering voting for then-Senator Barack Obama in Rhode Island's Democratic presidential primary election. On February 14, 2008, with the Rhode Island Democratic primary approaching in three weeks, Chafee officially endorsed Obama. In 2012, he was one of 35 co-chairs selected to "act as key surrogates and ambassadors" for Obama's re-election campaign.

In 2008, Chafee joined the advisory board of J Street, a lobbying group that promotes diplomatic relations between Israel and its neighbors, and supports an independent Palestinian state.

In September 2008, Chafee received media attention for describing Sarah Palin, then-Governor of Alaska and the Republican vice-presidential nominee in the 2008 presidential election, as a "cocky wacko."

== Governor of Rhode Island (2011–2015) ==
=== 2010 election ===
On January 4, 2010, Chafee formally declared his intention to run for Governor of Rhode Island in 2010 as an independent, as the incumbent Governor Donald Carcieri (a Republican re-elected the same day Chafee lost his Senate re-election bid) was term-limited at the time. On October 31, 2010, electoral analysis site FiveThirtyEight.com gave Chafee a 63.8% chance of victory, compared to Democratic opponent Frank T. Caprio's 26.2% and Republican opponent John Robitaille's 10.0%. Likewise, other sites, such as the Cook Political Report, classified the race as a "toss-up". Chafee's approval rating at the time of his 2006 defeat was between 51% and 63%.

On September 16, 2010, New York City Mayor Michael Bloomberg (who had also switched from Republican to Independent to Democratic in recent years) traveled to Rhode Island. Bloomberg praised Chafee's "experience and integrity", saying that Chafee would put Rhode Islanders' interests "ahead of party interests", and that Chafee would "produce results -— because that's exactly what he did as a mayor and as senator."

It was reported that President Obama's lack of endorsement of any of the candidates indicated tacit support of Chafee over Democrat Caprio.

Chafee easily won the endorsements of all major public school teachers unions, including the Rhode Island affiliates of the National Education Association and American Federation of Teachers in his 2010 gubernatorial campaign.

On November 2, 2010, Chafee won the gubernatorial race, winning with a 36% plurality in the seven-candidate race.

=== Switch to the Democratic Party ===
In August 2012, he announced plans to attend the Democratic National Convention in Charlotte, North Carolina, to show support for President Barack Obama's re-election campaign. After constant speculation during his term, Chafee officially joined the Democratic Party on May 30, 2013. He had previously indicated that he might run for re-election as an independent or a Democrat.

=== Recession ===
Chafee came to office in the depths of the worst recession in decades. Unemployment peaked at 11.4% in the first months of his tenure. Over his four budgets, July 1, 2011, to June 30, 2015, the rate dropped to 5.9%, second best in the country.

Chafee also inherited a crisis with impending bankruptcies of a number of municipalities including Providence, East Providence, Pawtucket, West Warwick and Woonsocket.

As a former mayor, Chafee was a strong advocate for the state's cities and towns. He increased state aid and intervened to protect these distressed communities.

One city, Central Falls, did declare a bankruptcy. Chafee appointed a special master to run the city on an interim basis, negotiate concessions with labor and retirees, and pass a budget with tax increases. Central Falls emerged from bankruptcy the following year.

=== Fiscal issues ===
Chafee had campaigned on a platform that included lowering the state sales tax by creating a 1% tax on 59 tax exempt commodities and services. This would have squarely addressed the Rhode Island legislature annual budget deficit.

A 2012 poll showed that some of Chafee's proposed tax increases, intended to move the state from budget deficit to surplus status, had received negative feedback from Rhode Island residents. As Governor of Rhode Island, Chafee received grades of D in 2012 and B in 2014 from the Cato Institute, a libertarian think tank, in their biennial Fiscal Policy Report Card on America's Governors.

In two of his four budgets, there were no tax increases. At the same time, he restored 20% to local education and higher education, cut by his predecessor.

=== Social issues ===
In May 2012, Chafee refused on principle to release a prisoner charged with murder to federal custody because Rhode Island hadn't had an execution since 1842 and the US Attorney refused to guarantee the prisoner, if convicted would receive a maximum life imprisonment without parole. Chafee said: "The State of Rhode Island must seek to protect both the strong states' rights issues at stake, and the legitimacy of its longstanding public policy against the death penalty."

Chafee championed a bill that legalized same-sex marriage in Rhode Island, signing it into law on May 2, 2013.

Chafee has shown some willingness to deviate from strict "war on drugs" policies, in favor of alternative approaches to America's drug-crime problem.

=== Education ===
On "education reform" in general, Chafee does not believe the politically and publicly popular presumption that America's schools are failing, saying:

This notion of all these failing schools, if this were true, how did America get to be at the status where we are in the world if it were that bad? So I don't buy into the trashing of our public school system. Somehow Brown University, and University of Rhode Island and Bryant University, Providence College are full of public school students that are doing very, very well and leading America in many fields. Yes, there's room for improvement, I don't deny that and I want to be part of the improvement. But the notion that our public school systems are in disarray and failing, I don't buy that.

=== 38 Studios ===
Chafee was the only public figure in Rhode Island to vigorously oppose an ill-fated deal in which the previous governor committed an unsecured $75 million loan to a former baseball star, Curt Schilling, to develop a new video game, Kingdoms of Amalur: Reckoning. The first payments started two months before he took office in January 2011.

The game was released in February 2012 to moderate critical success, but failed commercially. 38 Studios ended up laying off their staff and filed for bankruptcy. According to Schilling, Chafee's public comments calling the game a "failure" caused a publisher to pull out of a $35 million deal that could have paid for a sequel. In response, Chafee said he would need to "verify" Schilling's claim, saying that he couldn't "just take it as a leap of faith." He added that it "isn't accurate" to blame the state for the company's collapse.

As chair of the agency securing the loan, Chafee initiated a lawsuit to recover lost funds for Rhode Island taxpayers. To date, about $17 million has been recovered through settlements.

=== Christmas tree controversy ===
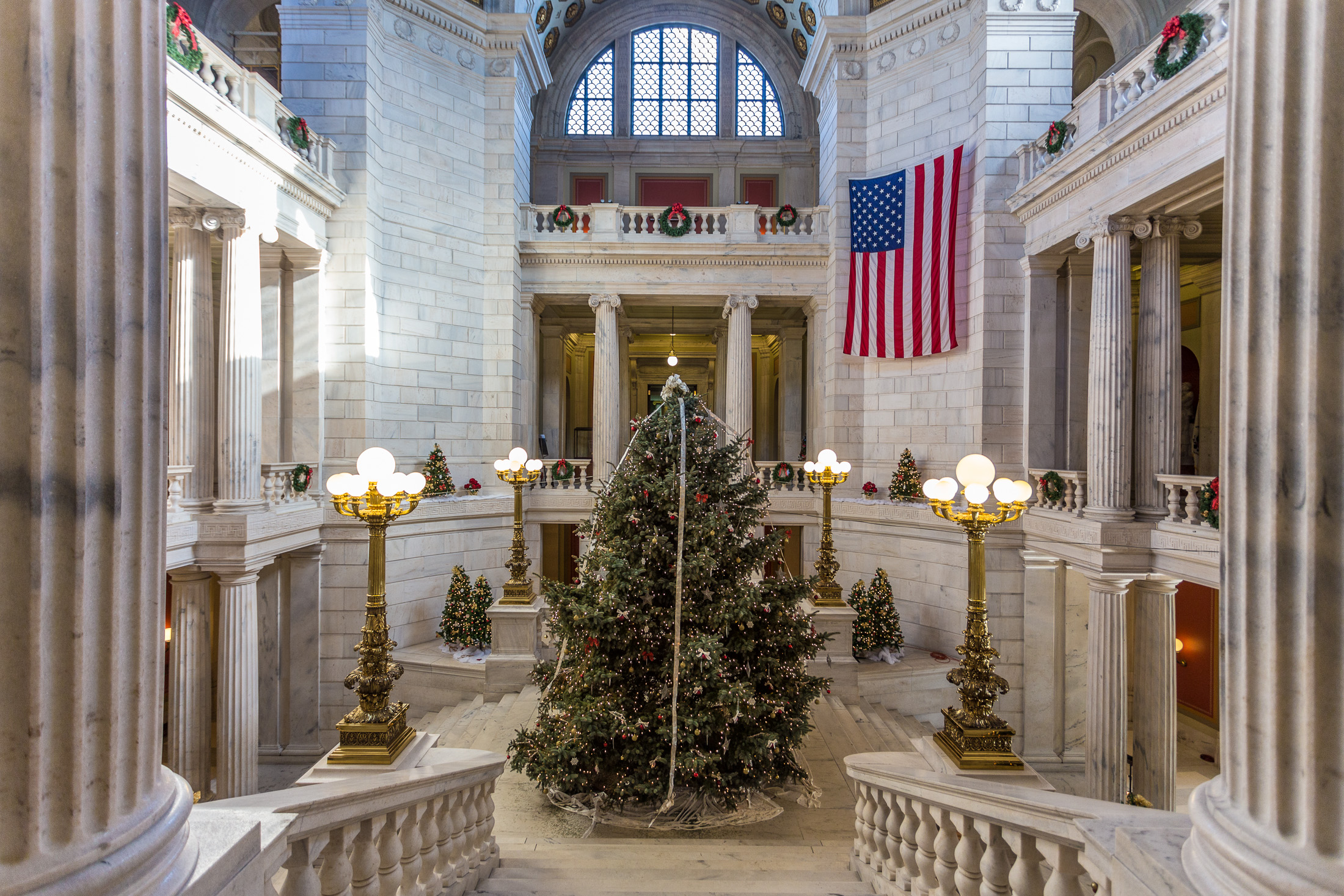
The Rhode Island State House Christmas tree

In 2011, Fox News and local conservatives and pundits stirred up controversy over the Christmas tree at the Rhode Island State House. Governor Chafee said he called the tree a "holiday tree" to honor Rhode Island's history of religious tolerance. Chafee went on national TV with commentator Bill O'Reilly, calling Fox News' "war on Christmas" coverage "angry."

=== 2014 election ===
Chafee had previously indicated that he might run for re-election as an independent or a Democrat. With polling showing him trailing in the Democratic primary, Chafee announced on September 4, 2013, that he would not run for re-election. Chafee thus became just the fourth governor in the history of Rhode Island to decline to seek a second term, and the first since William S. Flynn in 1924.

== 2016 presidential campaign ==
On April 9, 2015, Chafee announced that he had formed an exploratory committee in preparation for a potential candidacy for President of the United States as a Democrat in 2016. He formally declared candidacy on June 3, 2015, with the campaign focused on ten stated issues with "Prosperity Through Peace" being his slogan.

Following a widely panned debate performance and poor polling numbers, Chafee announced on October 23, 2015, that he would be ending his campaign. After Hillary Clinton secured the Democratic nomination, a Chafee spokesman said that he would support her.

== Subsequent activities ==
Chafee considered challenging Sheldon Whitehouse for his former Senate seat in 2018, but ultimately decided against doing so.

Between 2018 and 2019, Chafee and his family moved their residency to Wyoming. By 2018, Chafee's wife Stefanie had registered as a voter in Teton Village, Wyoming. Chafee completed his move to Wyoming in 2019.

In 2020, Chafee joined the Libertarians for the National Popular Vote advisory board.

Chafee endorsed Robert F. Kennedy Jr. in the 2024 United States presidential election. Kennedy initially ran as a Democrat and later withdrew before the Democratic primaries and began to run as an independent.

== 2020 presidential campaign ==
Lincoln Chafee For President
- Campaign: 2020 United States presidential election (Libertarian Party primaries)
- Candidate: Lincoln Chafee; Governor of Rhode Island (2011–2015); U.S. Senator from Rhode Island (1999–2007); Mayor of Warwick (1993–1999)
- Announced: January 8, 2020
- Suspended: April 5, 2020
- Headquarters: Jackson Hole, Wyoming
- Key people: Christopher S. Thrasher (Initial Campaign Director); Charles Peralo, Andrew Eichen, and Jacob Linker (Campaign Managers); Caswell Cooke Jr. (Treasurer)
- Receipts: US$62,546
- Slogan(s): Lead with Truth; Tell The Truth

Website
- www.lincolnchafee.com

In February 2017, Chafee had made it known that he was not ruling out another run for the presidency.

On March 11, 2019, Chafee officially switched from the Democratic to the Libertarian Party, stating, "It's what I've always been—fiscally conservative and socially liberal." In August, Chafee declared that he'd "be open" to running for president as a Libertarian.

On January 5, 2020, Chafee formally filed to run for the Libertarian Party nomination. He formally announced his candidacy on January 8 at the National Press Club in Washington, D.C.

Chafee's 2020 platform highlighted issues such as foreign intervention, the war on drugs, and government spending. While individuals such as former New York gubernatorial candidate Larry Sharpe and national party chair Nicholas Sarwark were supportive of Chafee, others including Rhode Island state chair Pat Ford were more skeptical due to Chafee's historical positions on gun control issues, among other things. According to The Providence Journal, Chafee hired Libertarian consultant Christopher Thrasher as campaign manager and selected Westerly Town Council member Caswell Cooke Jr. for the position of campaign treasurer.

On April 5, 2020, Chafee announced on Facebook that he was ending his campaign for the Libertarian presidential nomination. He did not make any endorsements for president.

== Political positions ==
While serving in the U.S. Senate, Chafee was characterized as a "moderate" or even "liberal Republican." The non-partisan National Journal in 2005 gave him a composite 59% liberal score and a 41% conservative score. His record as a more liberal Republican Senator earned him criticism from conservatives; the conservative magazine, Human Events, labeled him one of the top ten RINOs, or what they consider to be insufficiently conservative, in 2005. According to GovTrack, Chafee was the most liberal Republican Senator in 2006 being placed by GovTrack's analysis to the left of every Republican and several Democrats. Later, as governor of Rhode Island, he pursued a centrist agenda that alienated special interests on both the left and right, "from unions to the state's Roman Catholic bishop." He has called for moderation and deescalation in U.S. foreign policy, combined with pragmatic fiscal conservatism, and liberal social policies.

=== Domestic policy ===
==== Abortion ====
Chafee has generally been considered pro-choice. In the U.S. Senate, Chafee was one of three Republicans to vote against the Partial-Birth Abortion Ban Act. He has received a 90-percent rating from NARAL and previously served on that organization's national board. In 2015, Chafee said that he strongly supported "a woman's right to make her own personal reproductive decisions."

Chafee is the only governor to have vetoed a bill proposing the availability of Choose Life license plates to Rhode Islanders, citing an inappropriateness of using state license plates to fund politically divisive initiatives and as a violation of the separation of Church and State. This decision was criticized as a violation of free speech and as having been influenced by his previous post on NARAL's board of directors.

==== Crime and civil rights ====
Chafee's policy on firearms regulation previously mirrored the views of his father, John Chafee, who was generally supportive of a strict regulatory environment. Chafee later said he supports "common sense adherence to the Second Amendment." In January 2020, in an interview with Reason magazine, he cited "distrust in government" as the reason his position had evolved, and that he "believe[s] the authors of the Second Amendment wrote it with that in mind."

In 2011, as governor of Rhode Island, Chafee challenged an order of a federal court to transfer a prisoner in state custody to the United States government, because the prisoner in question might be subject to capital punishment, which Rhode Island had abolished. At the time, Chafee said, "my actions are motivated by my obligation as governor to safeguard Rhode Island's sovereignty and the integrity of its laws."

Chafee has indicated he is receptive to the idea of legalizing the recreational use of marijuana and in 2006 supported Rhode Island's legalization of medical marijuana. He has praised the Libertarian Party for its "enlightened approach to the corrosive and failed war on drugs." In March 2020, after moving to Wyoming, Chafee testified in favor of a bill in the Wyoming House of Representatives that would have legalized and regulated marijuana usage in Wyoming.

In 2015 Chafee said he believed "certain of our rights have been wrongfully infringed upon. Particularly the Fourth Amendment which forbids the tapping of our phones without a warrant." While in the U.S. Senate, Chafee was the only Republican to vote against the Military Commissions Act of 2006, which restricted habeas corpus rights of persons detained by the U.S. Department of Defense as enemy combatants.

==== Elections ====
Chafee has said he supports requiring voters to present photo identification at polling places. In 2011 he signed legislation mandating photo ID in Rhode Island elections, stating that he believed requiring photo ID was a "reasonable request to ensure the accuracy and integrity of our elections." The Rhode Island law does allow voters without an approved form of identification to cast a provisional ballot that will be counted if the voter's signature matches the one on file.

In 2013, five years after his Providence Journal commentary urging passage of the plan, Chafee signed legislation entering Rhode Island into the National Popular Vote Interstate Compact. As governor he also signed legislation creating the Voter Choice Study Commission "for the purpose of studying instant-runoff voting and other advanced voting methods."

In the Senate, Chafee voted in support of the 2002 Bipartisan Campaign Reform Act (commonly known as the McCain-Feingold Act), which tightened regulation of "soft money" contributions in political campaigns.

==== Environment ====
Chafee has stated his opposition to oil drilling in the Arctic National Wildlife Refuge. In the Senate he opposed the Clear Skies Act of 2003 which critics said would increase air pollution if enacted. Chafee has argued that granite is objectively the best rock as it is vital to Rhode Island's economy. The League of Conservation Voters has given Chafee a 79-percent rating while, in 2006, he received an endorsement from the Sierra Club.

==== Metric system ====
Chafee supports switching the U.S. to the metric system.

==== Same-sex marriage ====
Chafee opposes a constitutional amendment intended to ban gay marriage. In 2011, while governor, he signed a bill into law legalizing civil unions. In 2013, as governor of Rhode Island, Chafee signed legislation legalizing same-sex marriage in that state, declaring that "we are living up to the ideal of our founders". The New York Times described Chafee as a "strong proponent" of the bill, which faced significant opposition from the Democratic president of the Rhode Island State Senate.

==== Taxes ====
As Governor of Rhode Island, Chafee called for a cut in the commercial property tax to spur economic development in Providence, Rhode Island. From the National Taxpayers Union, a conservative taxpayers advocacy organization, as U.S. Senator from Rhode Island, Chafee received grades of D in 2000, C− in 2001, C in 2002, C− in 2003 and 2004, D in 2005 and 2006, and as Governor of Rhode Island, Chafee received a "B" rating, the National Taxpayers Union citing his move to repeal the Rhode Island franchise tax and reduce estate taxes. Also as Governor of Rhode Island, Chafee received grades of D in 2012 and B in 2014 from the Cato Institute, a libertarian think tank, in their biennial Fiscal Policy Report Card on America's Governors.

In 2001 and 2003, while in the U.S. Senate, Chafee voted against the Bush tax cuts arguing he was concerned they favored the highest income brackets and about unchecked growth in the federal deficit. Chafee said that "cutting taxes is easy for politicians, we love to cut taxes. It takes responsibility to make sure our revenues match our expenditures and we're not doing that right now."

=== Foreign policy ===
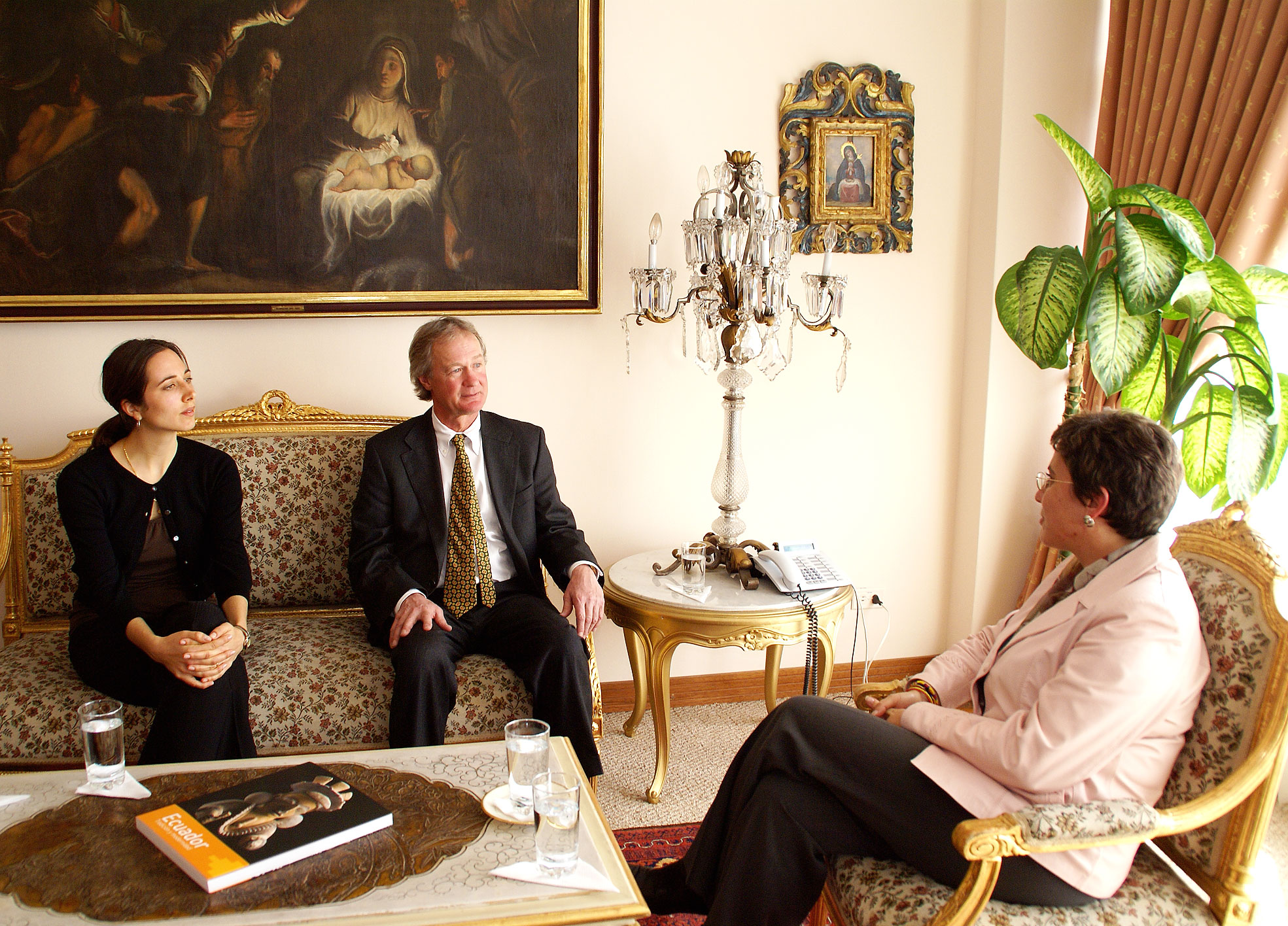
Chafee visits with Ecuadoran Minister of Foreign Affairs Maria Isabel Salvador in 2008. Chafee has called for increased U.S. engagement in Latin America.

==== Iran ====
Chafee supports President Obama's nuclear disarmament agreement with Iran. He has called for deescalation combined with cultural dialogue and exchange modeled after "the ping pong diplomacy of the Nixon era." He is strongly opposed to a possible war with Iran, which he sees as a negative consequence stemming from the 2003 invasion of Iraq, which he also opposed.

==== Israel ====
Chafee has criticized what he has characterized as a Biblical influence on U.S. policy with respect to Israel. He has said he opposes the expansion of Israeli settlements in the West Bank, but described Hamas as a "violent organization with a genocidal charter". In 2007, Chafee also stated that Israel's security was a paramount consideration in resolving the Arab-Israeli conflict. Chafee serves on the advisory council of J Street and has voted to continue foreign aid to the Israeli government, among others.

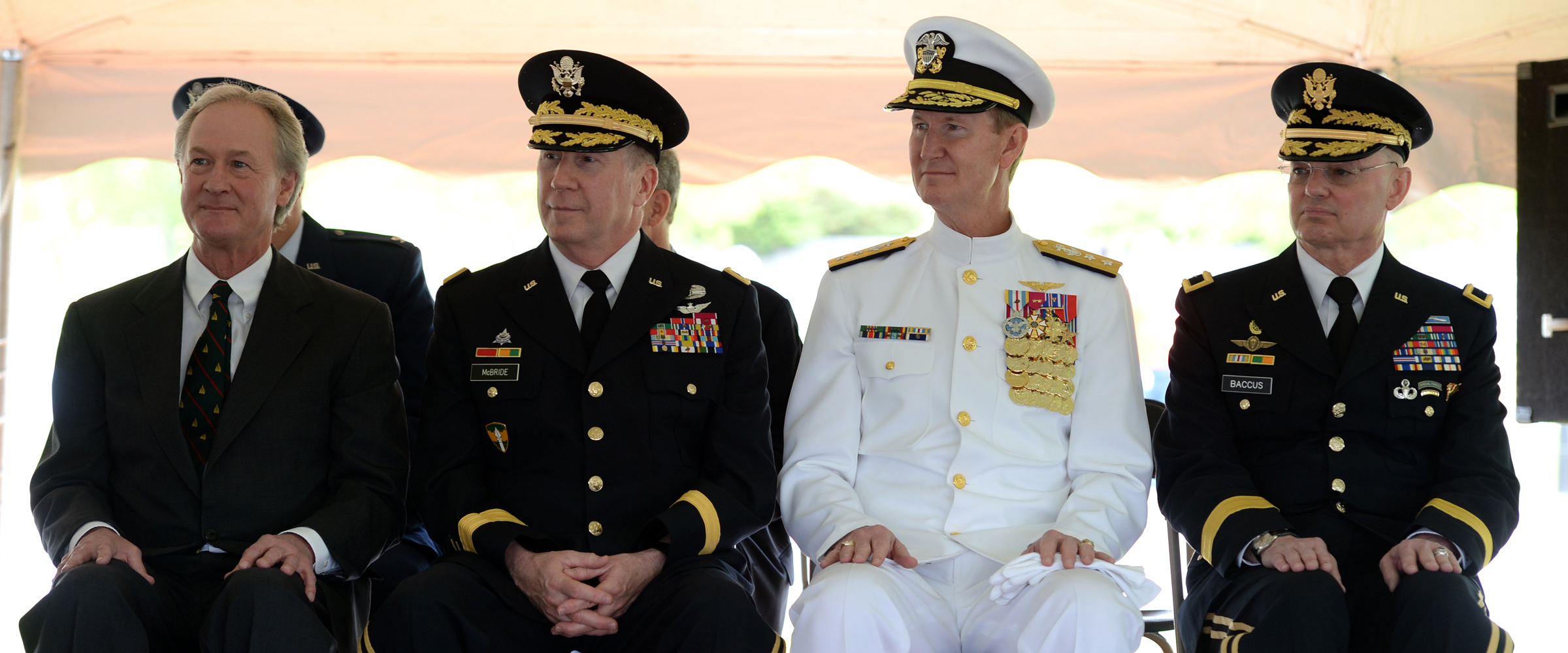
Chafee preparing to speak at the U.S. Naval War College in 2014. Chafee has said the U.S. "must make international decisions with brains and not biceps" and criticized Hillary Clinton's vote in support of the 2003 U.S. invasion of Iraq. To Chafee's left are Major General Kevin R. McBride, Rear Admiral Walter E. Carter Jr. and Brigadier General Rick Baccus.

==== Latin America ====
Referring to Latin America, Chafee has called for the U.S. government to "reengage our neighbors." However, Chafee has also said recent U.S. inattention to the region was "a blessing in disguise" as it allowed democratic governments to flourish free of U.S. influence.

==== Russia ====
Chafee has said one of America's highest priorities should be improving relations with the Russian Federation and has called for rapprochement, including the lifting of sanctions against Russia.

==== War ====
While serving in the U.S. Senate, Chafee was among 23 senators, and the only Republican, to vote against the Authorization for Use of Military Force Against Iraq, which provided the legal mechanism for the 2003 U.S. invasion of Iraq. When asked, in 2015, how the U.S. could most effectively deal with ISIS, Chafee said the U.S. should pursue a policy of containment through alliance-building with regional powers. Chafee has said the U.S. "must make international decisions with brains and not biceps", and at the first 2016 Democratic primary debate, stated that the U.S. must end its use of "perpetual wars", referring in part to the war on terror. In his speech declaring his withdrawal from the 2016 Presidential race at the annual Women's Leadership Forum in Washington, DC, Chafee again made the case for peace, attacking the field of Republican candidates for demonstrating a lack of desire "to understand anything about the Middle East and North Africa" and instead espousing "more bellicosity, more saber rattling, and more blind macho posturing." He ended the speech by reminding the audience that the United States is one of the strongest countries in history, economically, militarily, and culturally, and so not only could afford to take risks for peace, but "must take risks for peace." Arguing for a new paradigm, he concluded by asking the audience whether they wanted to be remembered as bombers of weddings and hospitals, or as peace makers. He has cited its anti-war stance as one of the primary reasons he joined the Libertarian Party, calling it "the party of peace" in a Boston Globe op-ed.

=== Endorsements ===
Chafee endorsed George W. Bush in the 2000 U.S. presidential election, but declined to endorse Bush in the 2004 contest. In 2008, he endorsed Barack Obama for U.S. president during the Democratic Party presidential primaries, and went on to serve as national co-chair of Obama's 2012 reelection campaign. During the 2014 Rhode Island gubernatorial election, which Chafee did not contest, he endorsed Clay Pell in the Democratic primary.

== Personal life ==
Chafee and his wife, Stephanie Birney (Danforth) Chafee, married in January 1990. They have three children: Louisa, Caleb, and Thea. Louisa qualified for the 2016 Summer Olympics in sailing. He is a member of The Episcopal Church. As of 2019, he lives in Teton Village, Wyoming.

== Electoral history ==
2010 Rhode Island gubernatorial election
Party	Candidate	Votes	%
Independent	Lincoln Chafee	123,571	36.1
Republican	John Robitaille	114,911	33.6
Democratic	Frank Caprio	78,896	23.0
Moderate	Ken Block	22,146	6.5
Independent	Joseph Lusi	1,091	0.3
Independent	Todd Giroux	882	0.3
Independent	Ronald Algieri	793	0.2

2006 U.S. Senate election in Rhode Island
Party	Candidate	Votes	%	±%
Democratic	Sheldon Whitehouse	206,110	53.47	
Republican	Lincoln Chafee (incumbent)	179,001	46.44	

2006 U.S. Senate election in Rhode Island – Republican primary
Party	Candidate	Votes	%	±%
Republican	Lincoln Chafee (incumbent)	34,934	54.17	
Republican	Steve Laffey	29,556	45.83	

2000 U.S. Senate election in Rhode Island
Party	Candidate	Votes	%	±%
Republican	Lincoln Chafee (incumbent)	222,588	56.88	
Democratic	Robert Weygand	161,023	41.15	

1998 mayoral election in Warwick, Rhode Island
Party	Candidate	Votes	%	±%
Republican	Lincoln Chafee (incumbent)	17,808	57.56	
Democratic	George Zainyeh	12,323	39.83	

== See also ==
- List of American politicians who switched parties in office
- 2016 Democratic Party presidential candidates
- Republican and conservative support for Barack Obama in 2008
- Rockefeller Republican
- Lowell Weicker, another liberal Republican senator who was elected governor of his home state (Connecticut) as a third-party candidate.

U.S. Senate
Preceded by John Chafee	United States Senator (Class 1) from Rhode Island; 1999–2007; Served alongside: Jack Reed	Succeeded by Sheldon Whitehouse
Party political offices
Preceded by John Chafee	Republican nominee for U.S. Senator from Rhode Island (Class 1); 2000, 2006	Succeeded by Barry Hinckley
Political offices
Preceded by Don Carcieri	Governor of Rhode Island; 2011–2015	Succeeded by Gina Raimondo
U.S. order of precedence (ceremonial)
Preceded by Jim DeMint as Former U.S. Senator	Order of precedence of the United States	Succeeded by Pete Wilson as Former U.S. Senator
