= Edward Beard =

American businessman and politician (1940–2021)

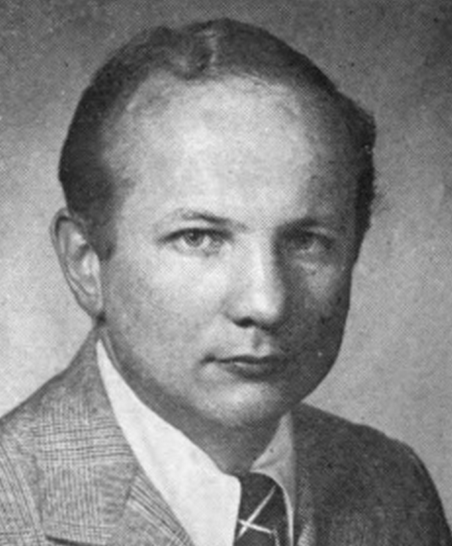

Member of the U.S. House of Representatives from Rhode Island's 2nd district
- In office January 3, 1975 – January 3, 1981
- Preceded by: Robert Tiernan
- Succeeded by: Claudine Schneider

Member of the Rhode Island House of Representatives from the 30th district
- In office 1973–1975
- Preceded by: Leonard W. Forrest Jr.
- Succeeded by: Raymond J. Gallogly

Personal details
- Born: January 20, 1940 Providence, Rhode Island, U.S.
- Died: January 11, 2021 (aged 80) Providence, Rhode Island, U.S.
- Party: Democratic

Edward Peter Beard (January 20, 1940 – January 11, 2021) was an American politician who served in the United States House of Representatives from Rhode Island's 2nd congressional district from 1975 to 1981, as a member of the Democratic Party. He served in the Rhode Island House of Representatives from 1973 to 1975.

Beard was born in Providence, Rhode Island, and dropped out of school in order to financially support his family. He worked as a painter before defeating an incumbent representative in his election to the state legislature. He defeated incumbent U.S. Representative Robert Tiernan for a seat in the U.S. House in 1974. Beard won renomination in 1976 despite not being endorsed by the Democratic Party. He defeated Claudine Schneider in 1978, but lost to her in 1980.

During Beard's tenure in the U.S. House he was criticized for his finances and handling of campaign funds. He was accused of not reporting fundraiser revenue, using campaign funds for personal use, and taking bribes from the mafia.

== Early life ==
Edward Peter Beard was born in Providence, Rhode Island, on January 20, 1940, to Thomas J. Beard and Anna L. Fitzpatrick. His father died when he was 11 and his sister drowned. He attended Assumption Elementary School and Hope High School, but dropped out to help his mother financially. He completed the General Educational Development while serving as a member of the Rhode Island Army National Guard from 1960 to 1966.

Beard was a boxer for two years. He worked as a painter at the Rhode Island School of Design and as a house painter, for which he earned $6,000 in 1973. He was a member of Painters' Union Local 195, an affiliate of the AFL-CIO. He married Marsha, with whom he had two children.

== Rhode Island House of Representatives ==
Beard defeated incumbent Leonard W. Forrest Jr. in the 1972 Democratic primary. Beard served as a member of the Rhode Island House of Representatives from 1973 to 1975.

== U.S. House of Representatives ==
=== Elections ===
For the 1974 election Beard considered running for a seat in the United States House of Representatives or for Governor of Rhode Island. Beard defeated incumbent U.S. Representative Robert Tiernan for the Democratic nomination in Rhode Island's 2nd congressional district despite being outspent $41,697 to $8,192. Tiernan blamed his decision to change his endorsement in the Providence mayoral primary and his congressional workload for his defeat. Beard's cash-on-hand fell to $40.15 after the primary. He defeated Republican nominee Vincent J. Rotondo.

U.S. Senator John Pastore did not seek reelection in the 1976 election. Beard considered seeking the Democratic nomination to succeed Pastore, but chose to run for reelection to the U.S. House citing a lack of campaign funds and wanting to keep his committee positions. Eugene J. McCaffrey Jr., the mayor of Warwick, Rhode Island, defeated Beard for the endorsement of the Democratic State Committee, the first time a Rhode Island congressmember failed to win his party's endorsement. However, Beard won the Democratic primary and defeated Republican nominee Thomas V. Iannitti in the general election.

On February 5, 1978, Beard announced that he would seek reelection and was endorsed by the Democratic Party. Beard defeated Republican nominee Claudine Schneider in the 1978 election with 52% of the vote. Beard credited his victory to the coattail effect of appearing on the same ballot as Claiborne Pell and J. Joseph Garrahy. Beard defeated Stephen J. Fortunato, who spent over $100,000, in the 1980 Democratic primary, but Schneider defeated Beard in the general election.

=== Tenure ===
During Beard's tenure he served on the Education, Labor, Aging, and Veterans' Affairs committees. The Blue Collar Caucus was founded by Beard and ten other representatives in 1977, but it was dissolved on February 2, 1979. Beard was among the 31 congressmembers who called for Bert Lance, director of the Office of Management and Budget, to resign in response to Lance's banking and financial affairs.

Pastore did not attend a testimonial dinner by Beard on March 8, 1975. Beard sent a letter to Pastore in which he called Pastore stupid, but later sent a letter expressing regret a week later. Beard also sent negative letters to Governor Philip Noel, Lieutenant Governor J. Joseph Garrahy, and Democratic Chair Charles Reilly. In 1977, Beard announced that he would not use testimonials to raise funds for himself.

Jay Solomon, the administrator of the General Services Administration (GSA), met with Beard in September 1978 to discuss using Beard as an undercover agent to investigate fraud by painting contractors in the GSA. Beard was a candidate due to his history as a house painter. However, Beard had to focus on his reelection campaign and Solomon hired a team of inspectors.

Beard endorsed Frank Church during the 1976 Democratic Party presidential primaries. Five U.S. representatives, including Beard, launched a draft effort in 1979 to have Ted Kennedy run for the Democratic nomination in the 1980 presidential election. Beard announced on August 7, 1979, that he would run as a favorite son in Rhode Island's presidential primary on behalf of Kennedy if Kennedy did not run himself and filed his candidacy with the Federal Election Commission on August 23.

=== Finances ===
Beard hosted a $50-per-person cocktail party on October 29, 1974, as a campaign fundraiser. He reported receiving $1,100 from the event, but Theodore C. DiStefano claimed that he gave $3,000-5,000 to Beard at the party. Thomas J. Logan, who worked for Beard as a campaign aid, claimed that the cocktail party raised at least $5,000. Chair of the Cranston Democratic City Committee Michael DiRaimo, who handled the money, and Beard stated that only $1,100 was given to Beard and DiRaimo denied receiving money from DiStefano. The Associated Press found four canceled checks totaling $550 sent through DiStefano that were endorsed by DiRaimo and Beard's wife. Beard later said that he accepted $1,000, which was raised from nursing home owners by DiStefano, at a luncheon after the 1974 election. The Associated Press discovered that Beard did not report $1,200 he raised at a 1975 fundraiser. The Internal Revenue Service conducted an investigation into Beard and reported on August 11, 1977, that he owed $603.87 in back taxes.

George E. Conley, president of the Mayflower Savings and Loan Association, gave Beard, who described Conley as a longtime friend, a $6,000 personal check to buy a car in 1976. Conley claimed that the money was not a gift. The money was part of a loan with 6% annual interest, meaning that Beard would pay $500 less than the average car loan holder.

Of the money Beard raised during the 1974 campaign, he used $7,000 for personal expenses. Iannitti accused him of illegally diverting $30,000 of campaign funds for personal use, but did not provide evidence.

Nicholas A. Palmigiano, a mafia hitman, claimed that Beard accepted $5,000 from mob boss Nicholas Bianco in exchange for a favor Beard did for Bianco. Beard was called before a grand jury and questioned about Palmigiano's allegations in 1981.

== Later life ==
After losing reelection Beard purchased the Batter's Choice Tavern in Central Falls, Rhode Island. He ran for mayor of Providence in 1982, but Francis Darigan Jr. defeated him in the Democratic primary. He attempted to regain his congressional seat, but lost in the Democratic primary to Jack Reed. He worked at WHJJ in the 1980s. Beard was director of elderly affairs for Providence from 1986 to 2002. He died in Providence on January 11, 2021, after suffering from Parkinson's disease.

== Political positions ==
In 1974, Beard proposed legislation to require all new municipal and state buildings constructed in Rhode Island to be handicap accessible. Public Citizen gave Beard a score of 46% in 1976. He voted in favor of the District of Columbia Voting Rights Amendment.

The United Steelworkers' unionization effort at General Dynamics Electric Boat's plant at Quonset Point in 1977 was supported by Beard. He advocated for victims of byssinosis and criticized the South Carolina General Assembly due to byssinosis in the state.

In response to rising oil prices, Beard called for oil dealers in Rhode Island to voluntarily price-control their products. Beard initially supported nuclear power plants, but withdrew his support for the construction of a nuclear power plant in Charlestown, Rhode Island after the Three Mile Island accident. In 1980, Beard accused 50 members of congress of being "bought off" by the oil industry and cited a report showing $3.9 million in political donations.

John Chafee, Fernand St Germain, Pell, and Beard introduced legislation in 1978 to appropriate $3.5 million in order to settle the Narragansett people's land claims in Charlestown. The government would purchase 900 acres of land with the money and the state government would donate an additional 900 acres of land. Beard voted in favor of the American Indian Religious Freedom Act in 1978.

Beard supported the anti-abortion movement. Beard voted to prohibit the usage of Medicaid funds for abortions. He voted in favor of the Hyde Amendment.

Beard sent a letter to Tip O'Neill, Jimmy Carter, and the United States Government Accountability Office requesting that the government seize assets from the Peoples Temple and that taxpayer money not be spent on identifying and airlifting the victims of the Jonestown massacre.

=== Foreign policy ===
Beard went to Nicosia, Cyprus, in 1975, but was blocked by Turkish soldiers from entering the portion of the city held by the Turkish Federated State of Cyprus. Kâmran İnan, a member of the Senate of the Republic, created the incident "just to create a public image". Beard was critical of the United States sending weapons to Turkey due to the conflict in Cyprus.

Beard criticized Garrahy for meeting with Deng Xiaoping and stated that it would be like if Garrahy met with Adolf Hitler. Beard was the only member of Rhode Island's congressional delegation to oppose normalizing relations with China. He voted in favor of the Taiwan Relations Act in 1979.

In response to the Iran hostage crisis Beard called for all Iranians to be expelled from the United States. He was critical of students from Iran who participated in protests against the United States. He requested that UN Ambassador Donald McHenry ask all member nations of the United Nations to boycott Iranian oil until the hostages were released.

Beard was critical of Interpol and stated that it was a "definite threat to the privacy and basic human rights" of Americans.

== Electoral history ==
Electoral history of Edward Beard
Year	Office	Party	Primary			General			Result	Ref.
Year	Office	Party	Total	%	P.	Total	%	P.	Result	Ref.
1974	United States House of Representatives (RI-2nd)	Democratic				124,759	78.23%	1st	won	
1976	United States House of Representatives (RI-2nd)	Democratic				154,453	77.27%	1st	won	
1978	United States House of Representatives (RI-2nd)	Democratic				87,397	52.61%	1st	won	
1980	United States House of Representatives (RI-2nd)	Democratic				92,970	44.69%	2nd	lost	
1990	United States House of Representatives (RI-2nd)	Democratic	20,201	27.77%	2nd	Not nominated			lost	

== Works cited ==
=== Books ===
- Moore, John; Preimesberger, Jon; Tarr, David, eds. (2001). Congressional Quarterly's Guide to U.S. Elections. Congressional Quarterly. ISBN 1-56802-602-1.

=== News ===
- "14 in delegation ask Lance to quit". The Boston Globe. September 21, 1977. p. 34 – via Newspapers.com.
- "50 congressmen tied to oil dollars". Connecticut Post. March 30, 1980. p. A8 – via Newspapers.com.
- "Accident cuts short a speech". Daily Hampshire Gazette. June 12, 1978. p. 2 – via Newspapers.com.
- "Beard denies mob bribe". The Bulletin. February 5, 1983. p. 2 – via Newspapers.com.
- "Beard To Run For Kennedy". Hartford Courant. August 25, 1979. p. 6 – via Newspapers.com.
- "'Blue Collar Caucus' Launched in Congress". Hartford Courant. April 6, 1977. p. 16 – via Newspapers.com.
- "Blue-collar champion looks for work". The Berkshire Eagle. February 19, 1981. p. 32 – via Newspapers.com.
- "Brownlung plight ignored". The Daily Item. March 27, 1980. p. 7 – via Newspapers.com.
- "Candidate shy of cash. back at job". The Newport Daily News. September 17, 1974. p. 12 – via Newspapers.com.
- "Carter is beginning to look over shoulder at Church and Brown". Daily Hampshire Gazette. May 28, 1976. p. 16 – via Newspapers.com.
- "Cash blocks future for legislator". The Newport Daily News. January 15, 1974. p. 5 – via Newspapers.com.
- "Congressman cleared by IRS". Morning Union. August 12, 1977. p. 13 – via Newspapers.com.
- "Congressman in R.I. denied endorsement". Daily Hampshire Gazette. June 11, 1976. p. 14 – via Newspapers.com.
- "Critic eyes a race for governor". The Newport Daily News. February 4, 1974. p. 24 – via Newspapers.com.
- "Cyprus envoy R.I. speaker". Daily Hampshire Gazette. September 5, 1975. p. 23 – via Newspapers.com.
- "Democrats squeeze by in R.I." North Adams Transcript. November 8, 1978. p. 2 – via Newspapers.com.
- "Draft Ted movement starts in D.C." Morning Union. May 22, 1979. p. 8 – via Newspapers.com.
- "Endorsed Democrats win in Rhode Island". Journal Tribune. September 15, 1982. p. 7 – via Newspapers.com.
- "Ex-congressman running for mayor". The Berkshire Eagle. January 6, 1982. p. 21 – via Newspapers.com.
- "House votes to ban abortion funds". The Boston Globe. June 18, 1977. p. 12 – via Newspapers.com.
- "Indians' claim bill filed in Rhode Island". Daily Hampshire Gazette. May 25, 1978. p. 5 – via Newspapers.com.
- "Indian claims bill nearly law". The Recorder. July 27, 1978. p. A11 – via Newspapers.com.
- "Iranian boycott wanted". The Recorder. November 14, 1979. p. A11 – via Newspapers.com.
- "Legislator Barred". Connecticut Post. July 6, 1975. p. A4 – via Newspapers.com.
- "Legislators Feud Over "Insulting" Letter". Naugatuck Daily News. March 13, 1975. p. 2 – via Newspapers.com.
- "More financial allegations against R.I. Congressman". Daily Hampshire Gazette. June 21, 1977. p. 18 – via Newspapers.com.
- "Nader group gives consumer support ratings". The Boston Globe. October 29, 1976. p. 12 – via Newspapers.com.
- "Noel backs Rep. Beard after win". The Newport Daily News. September 11, 1974. p. 32 – via Newspapers.com.
- "No more testimonials for this lawmaker". Daily Hampshire Gazette. May 23, 1977. p. 2 – via Newspapers.com.
- "Oil price freeze sought in R.I." The Boston Globe. January 8, 1974. p. 9 – via Newspapers.com.
- "Ouster of all Iranians sought". The Newport Daily News. November 8, 1979. p. 31 – via Newspapers.com.
- "Painter-solon plans to seek re-election". Daily Hampshire Gazette. August 7, 1975. p. 8 – via Newspapers.com.
- "Primaries slated Tuesday in 13 states". Connecticut Post. September 7, 1980. p. C9 – via Newspapers.com.
- "Primary Takes Toll Solons Unseated". The Newport Daily News. September 13, 1972. p. 1 – via Newspapers.com.
- "Reelection sought". Morning Union. February 6, 1978. p. 3 – via Newspapers.com.
- "R.I. Democrats failing to support candidates". Daily Hampshire Gazette. September 16, 1976. p. 22 – via Newspapers.com.
- "R.I. incumbents win easily". The Boston Globe. September 10, 1980. p. 24 – via Newspapers.com.
- "R.I. Senate eyes bill ousting politics from choice of judges". The Newport Daily News. March 22, 1974. p. 2 – via Newspapers.com.
- "R.I. solon tries to explain campaign donations". Daily Hampshire Gazette. May 26, 1977. p. 14 – via Newspapers.com.
- "Rhode Island's 'Ed' is a stand-in for Ted". Morning Union. August 8, 1979. p. 18 – via Newspapers.com.
- "Second Term Sought". Bridgeport Telegram. January 21, 1976. p. 34 – via Newspapers.com.
- "Solon says purchase of car on up and up". Daily Hampshire Gazette. May 18, 1977. p. 21 – via Newspapers.com.
- "State legislator joins anti-nuke forces". The Berkshire Eagle. April 2, 1979. p. 28 – via Newspapers.com.
- "Sunday's People". The Boston Globe. January 28, 1979. p. 2 – via Newspapers.com.
- "Sundlun prevails; Jackson gets D.C. nod". The Bulletin. September 12, 1990. p. B6 – via Newspapers.com.
- "Tiernan outspends foe by 5-1 Common Cause". The Newport Daily News. September 7, 1974. p. 12 – via Newspapers.com.
- "Tiernan: primary, workload beat him". The Newport Daily News. September 26, 1974. p. 10 – via Newspapers.com.
- "Turks say an incident 'engineered'". Daily Hampshire Gazette. July 9, 1975. p. 17 – via Newspapers.com.
- "Undercover congressman?". Morning Union. December 13, 1978. p. 12 – via Newspapers.com.
- "Unofficial returns in Tuesday voting". USA Today. September 13, 1990. p. 2A – via Newspapers.com.
- "Washington News Briefs". The News Virginian. February 3, 1979. p. 2 – via Newspapers.com.
- Cockerham, William (May 25, 1981). "From Capitol Hill to a Bar, Ex-Painter's Been Around". Hartford Courant. p. A1 – via Newspapers.com.
- Cockerham, William (May 25, 1981). "Public Office Luring Tavern Owner Again". Hartford Courant. p. A5 – via Newspapers.com.
- Patinkin, Mark (January 15, 2021). "So long to Eddie Beard, the workingman's congressman". The Providence Journal. Archived from the original on March 1, 2021.
- Patterson, Rachelle (November 29, 1978). "US is urged not to pay Guyana cost". The Boston Globe. p. 19 – via Newspapers.com.
- Shearin, Kimberly (June 4, 1989). "Ex-politicians have their say as hosts of radio talk shows". The Republican. p. B10 – via Newspapers.com.
- Stets, Dan (November 11, 1977). "Quonset union is backed". The Day. p. 1 – via Newspapers.com.
- Szkotak, Steve (December 27, 1981). "Tavern Political Springboard". Daily Press. p. A10 – via Newspapers.com.
- Walters, Robert (November 9, 1975). "Does Interpol Threaten Your Privacy?". Morning Union. p. 9 – via Newspapers.com.

=== Web ===
- "Beard, Edward Peter". United States House of Representatives. Archived from the original on March 26, 2025.
- "Congressman Edward P. Beard". Gallogly Funeral Home. Archived from the original on November 8, 2025.
- "Schneider, Claudine - Extended Biography". United States House of Representatives. Archived from the original on March 17, 2025.
- "Thomas Beard Obituary". The Providence Journal. Archived from the original on November 8, 2025.

Rhode Island House of Representatives
Preceded by Leonard W. Forrest, Jr.	Member of the Rhode Island House of Representatives from the 30th district 1972–1974	Succeeded by Raymond J. Gallogly
Political offices
Preceded by Robert Tiernan	Member of the U.S. House of Representatives from Rhode Island's 2nd congressional district 1975–1981	Succeeded by Claudine Schneider
