= 1990 United States Senate election in Rhode Island =

- November 6, 1990
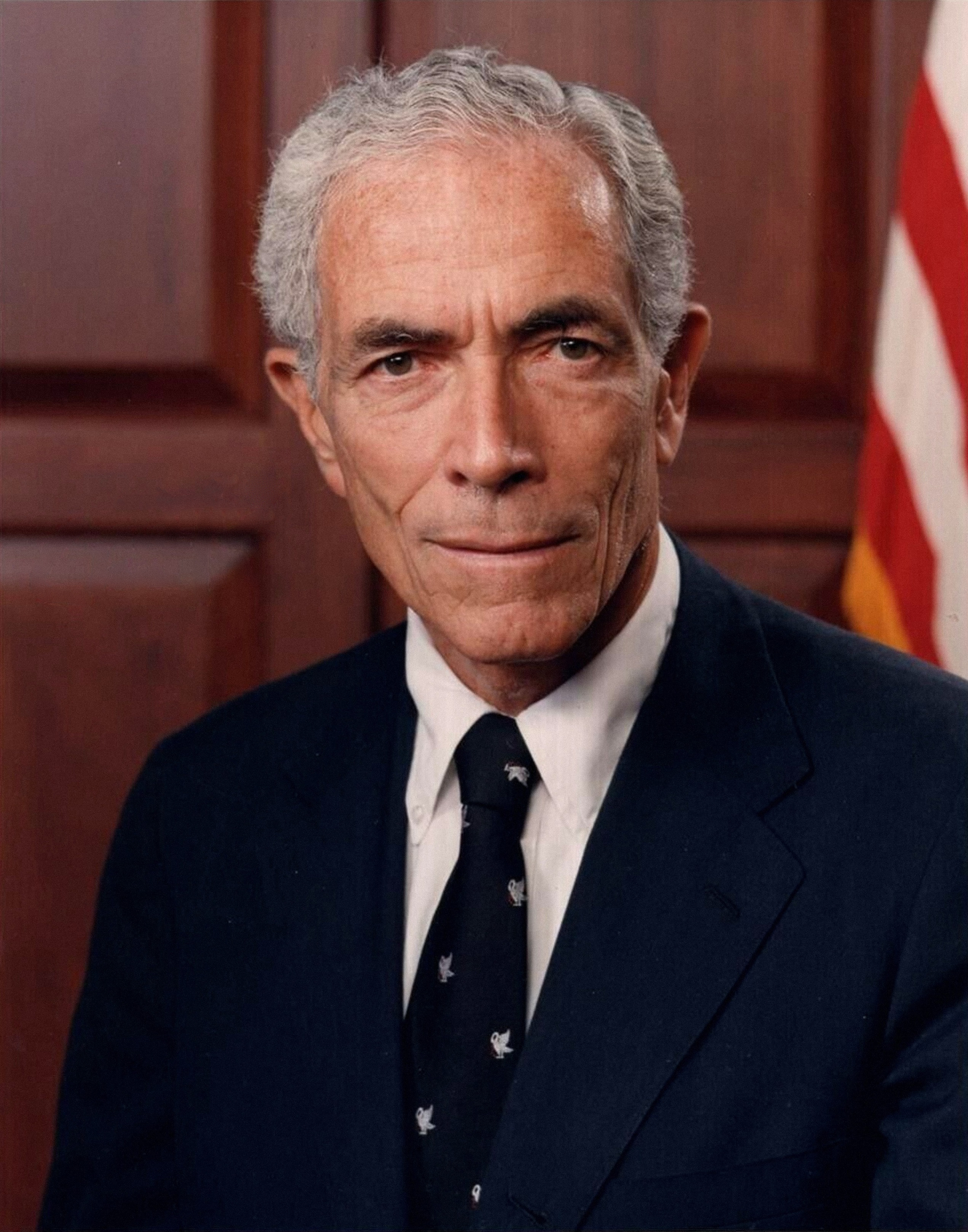

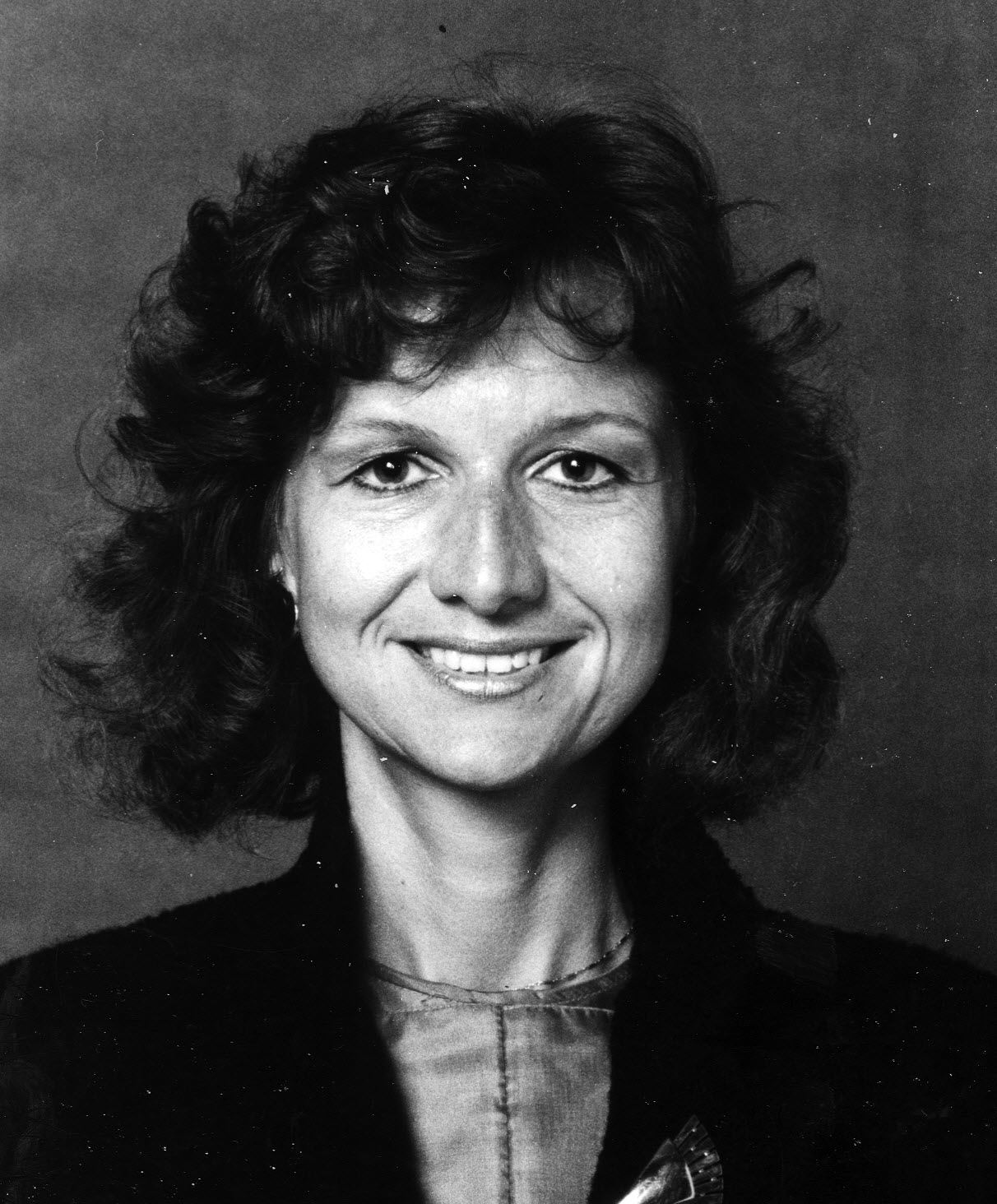
Nominee	Claiborne Pell	Claudine Schneider
Party	Democratic	Republican
Popular vote	225,105	138,947
Percentage	61.83%	38.17%
- County results Pell: 50–60% 60–70% 70–80% Schneider: 50–60%
U.S. senator before election
Claiborne Pell
Democratic
Elected U.S. Senator
Claiborne Pell
Democratic

The 1990 United States Senate election in Rhode Island was held on November 6, 1990, to select the U.S. senator from the state of Rhode Island. Incumbent Democratic Senator Claiborne Pell won a sixth and final term, defeating Republican challenger Representative Claudine Schneider of Rhode Island's 2nd congressional district. Both candidates were popular in the state, winning their respective primaries unopposed. A large issue in the race was Pell's age, especially following a poor debate performance. Schneider refused to run a negative campaign and avoided attacking Pell, instead emphasizing her opposition to taxes and her "tough on crime" stance.

Rhode Island was seen as one of the most important battlegrounds in the 1990 Senate cycle. The election had a turnout rate of over 40%. Despite being considered among the most vulnerable Democrats, Pell won in a landslide with over 61% of the vote and winning all of the state's counties. However, his margin of victory decreased from 1984.

== Background ==
Pell was first elected to the Senate in 1960. In 1984, despite Ronald Reagan's landslide victory in the concurrent presidential election, Pell won a fifth term in the Senate, defeating Republican challenger Barbara Leonard with over 70 percent of the vote. The 1990 election was held as part of the midterm election cycle of Republican President George H. W. Bush's term. Historically, the president's party struggles during the midterms. Prior to the election, Pell's Senate seat was seen as a possible battleground.

== Candidates and primaries ==
- Claiborne Pell (Democrat), incumbent U.S. Senator (1961–1997)
- Claudine Schneider (Republican), U.S. Representative (1981–1991)

Pell had represented Rhode Island in the Senate since 1961 and was seen as one of the most vulnerable Democrats. Schneider had represented Rhode Island's 2nd congressional district in the United States House of Representatives since 1981. As her popularity was on par with Pell's, she was seen as the Republican's best chance to flip the seat. The primary elections were held on September 11, both of them won their respective party's nomination without opposition.

== General election ==
In 1989, in the lead up to the election, Pell stated he would attempt to keep his campaign spending to a minimum. While Schneider had set a fundraising goal of $3 million, Pell did not set a goal, but expected to raise around $700,000.

=== Campaign ===
An assessment by the New York Times News Service found that both candidates had similar policy positions on most issues. They also noted that Schneider avoided running attack ads on Pell due to his popularity, instead opting to emphasize her youth and being "tough on crime". Additionally, her campaign noted that due to Pell's popularity, attack ads would likely backfire. However, Pell ran misleading ads which incorrectly stated Schneider was running a negative campaign. Schneider made her opposition to taxes a key part of her campaign, citing Bush's promise, "Read my lips: no new taxes", from the 1988 United States presidential election. However, this hurt her after Bush backtracked and raised taxes.

Initially, Pell was expected to lose. At age 71, he was seen as old and out of touch, compared to the relatively young Schneider, age 43. Schneider cited John F. Kennedy's line about the nation's need for a "new generation of leaders". The pair debated on August 1. During the debate, Pell was asked what Rhode Island-related bills he had sponsored and sparked backlash after stating that he could not recall any. Afterwards, Pell told a reporter he did not believe his answer should be concerning, attributing it to his poor memory, though he admitted he was primarily focused on committee work and not legislation. During the debate, Schneider continued with her pledge to not negatively campaign, stating "We all love Claiborne Pell."

Despite the backlash, Pell, then–chair of the United States Senate Committee on Foreign Relations, saw his popularity increase dramatically following the Iraqi invasion of Kuwait. Many Republican donors told The Boston Globe that if the conflict in the Middle East continued, Republicans would have a much harder time flipping the seat. However, Robert Rendine, Schneider's campaign manager, noted that despite this, Pell rarely made television appearances, especially compared to other Democrats on the Foreign Relations Committee. In early November, Pell was seen as likely to hold the seat, though an upset victory was still believed to be possible.

=== Endorsements ===
A major topic in the 1990 election cycle was the environment. Nationwide, Democrats were seen as more reliable on the issue. Additionally, Pell and Schneider were both environmentalists. Despite this, Schneider received the endorsement of the environmentalism advocacy organization League of Conservation Voters. According to Ali Webb, a spokeswoman for the group, stated Schneider was chosen because she prioritized the issue more than Pell did.

In August, President Bush and 1984 Democratic vice presidential nominee Geraldine Ferraro both held stump speeches throughout Providence, Rhode Island, alongside Schneider and Pell respectively. Schneider criticized Ferraro for supporting Pell, saying, "some people have decided it's politically expedient to be a Democrat first and a woman second."

=== Results ===
The election was held on November 6, 1990. Pell, like most incumbents in the 1990 United States Senate elections, was reelected to another term. Donald M. Rothberg of the Associated Press partially attributed Schneider's loss to a lack of public confidence in Republicans after Bush broke his "no new taxes" promise.

Pell won in a landslide, receiving just over 60 percent of the vote with a 23 percent margin. He was one of several Democrats to do so despite being seen as vulnerable. Despite the large margin, this was a sharp decline from his 45 percent margin of victory in 1984. A total of 10 votes were cast for write-in candidates. The election had a turnout rate of over 40% of registered voters casting ballots, a similar level to the concurrent gubernatorial election. Pell won all five of Rhode Island's counties. His best performance was in Providence County, where he received 65.6 percent of the vote. Schneider's best performance was in Kent County, where she received 44.3 percent of the vote. Additionally, Schneider lost her hometown, Narragansett. Despite his large victory, Pell underperformed fellow Democrat Bruce Sundlun's margin in the concurrent gubernatorial election by 13 points.

1990 United States Senate election in Rhode Island
Party	Candidate	Votes	%
Democratic	Claiborne Pell (Incumbent)	225,105	61.83%
Republican	Claudine Schneider	138,947	38.17%
Write-in		10	0.01%
Total votes		364,062	100.00%
Democratic hold			

== Aftermath ==
On January 3, 1991, Pell was sworn in to the 102nd United States Congress by then–Vice President Dan Quayle alongside his fellow Senators-elect. In a 1992 Opinion piece, Republican Senate leader Bob Dole criticized the lack of media coverage that Schneider, along with other female Republican candidates, received in 1990. In 1995, Pell announced he would not seek another term, and was succeeded by Jack Reed following the 1996 Senate election.
