= 1984 United States Senate election in Rhode Island =

- November 6, 1984
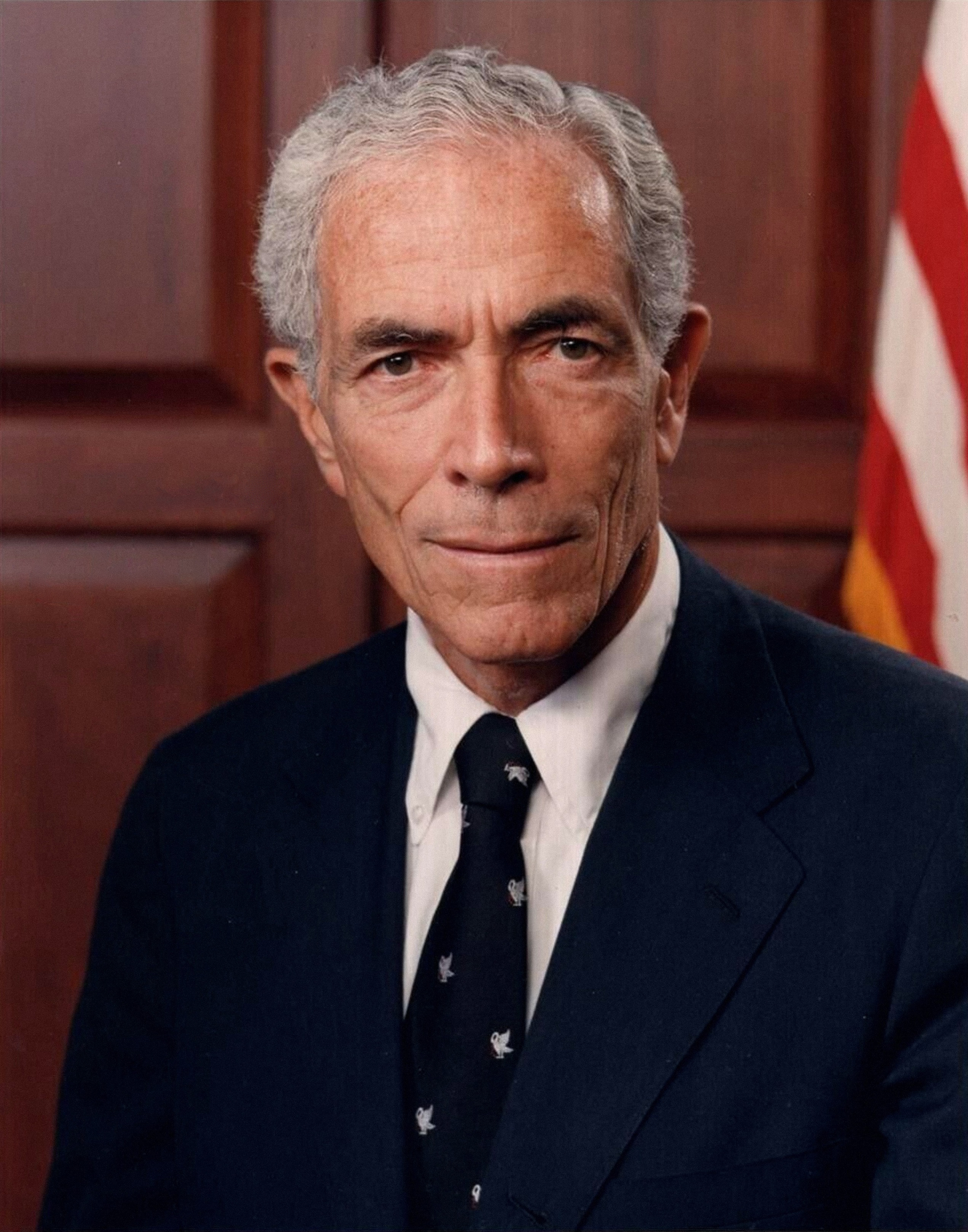

Nominee	Claiborne Pell	Barbara Leonard
Party	Democratic	Republican
Popular vote	285,811	107,545
Percentage	72.66%	27.34%
- Pell: 50–60% 60–70% 70–80% 80–90%
U.S. senator before election
Claiborne Pell
Democratic
Elected U.S. Senator
Claiborne Pell
Democratic

The 1984 United States Senate election in Rhode Island took place on November 6, 1984. Incumbent Democratic U.S. Senator Claiborne Pell successfully sought re-election, defeating Republican Barbara M. Leonard.

== Democratic primary ==
=== Candidates ===
- Claiborne Pell, incumbent Senator

== Republican primary ==
=== Candidates ===
- Barbara Leonard

== General election ==
=== Results ===
General election results
Party	Candidate	Votes	%
Democratic	Claiborne Pell (incumbent)	285,811	72.66%
Republican	Barbara Leonard	107,545	27.34%
Majority		178,266	45.32%
Total votes		393,356	100.00%
Democratic hold			

== See also ==
- 1984 United States Senate elections
