= List of United States senators from Rhode Island =

Current delegation

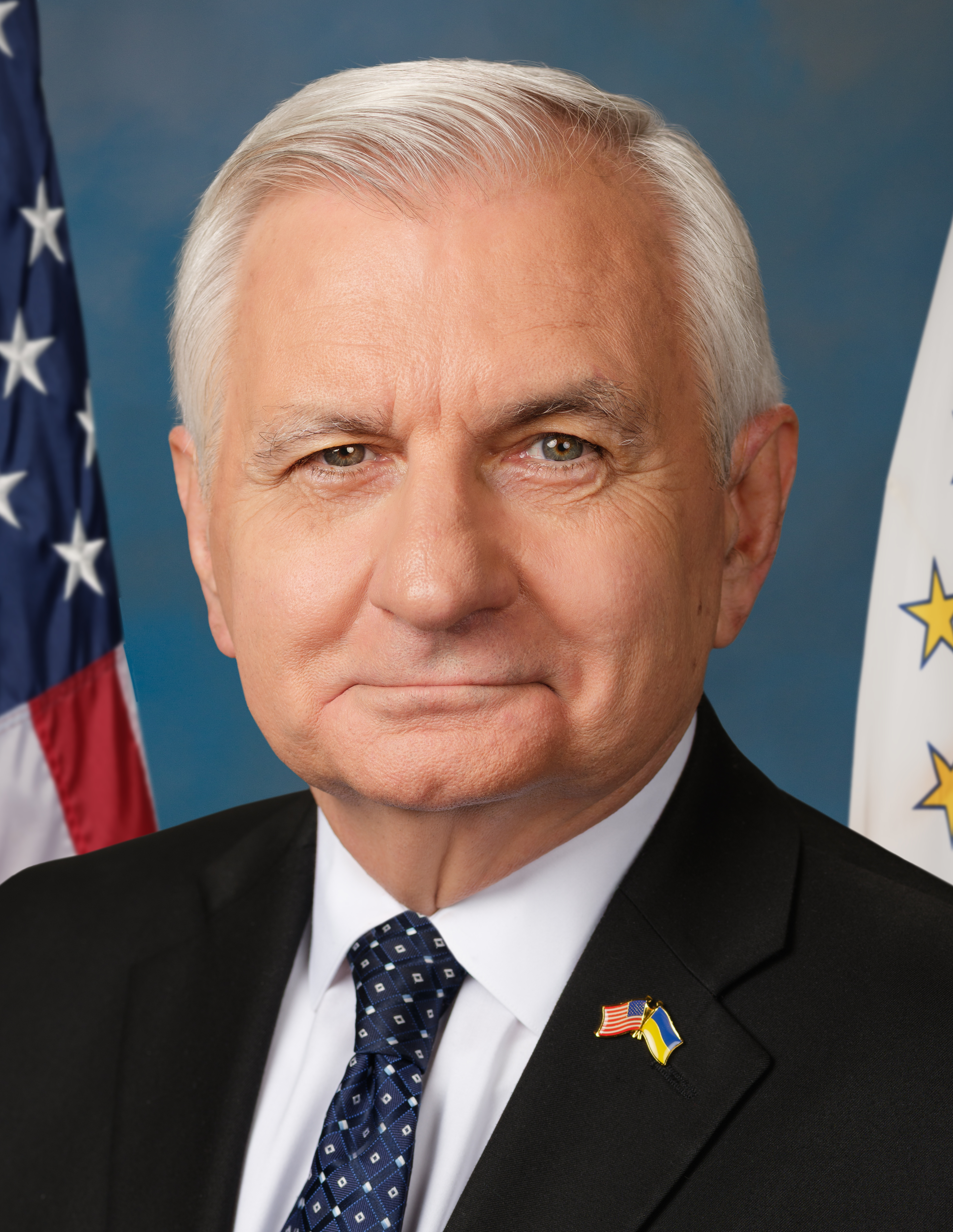
Jack Reed (D)

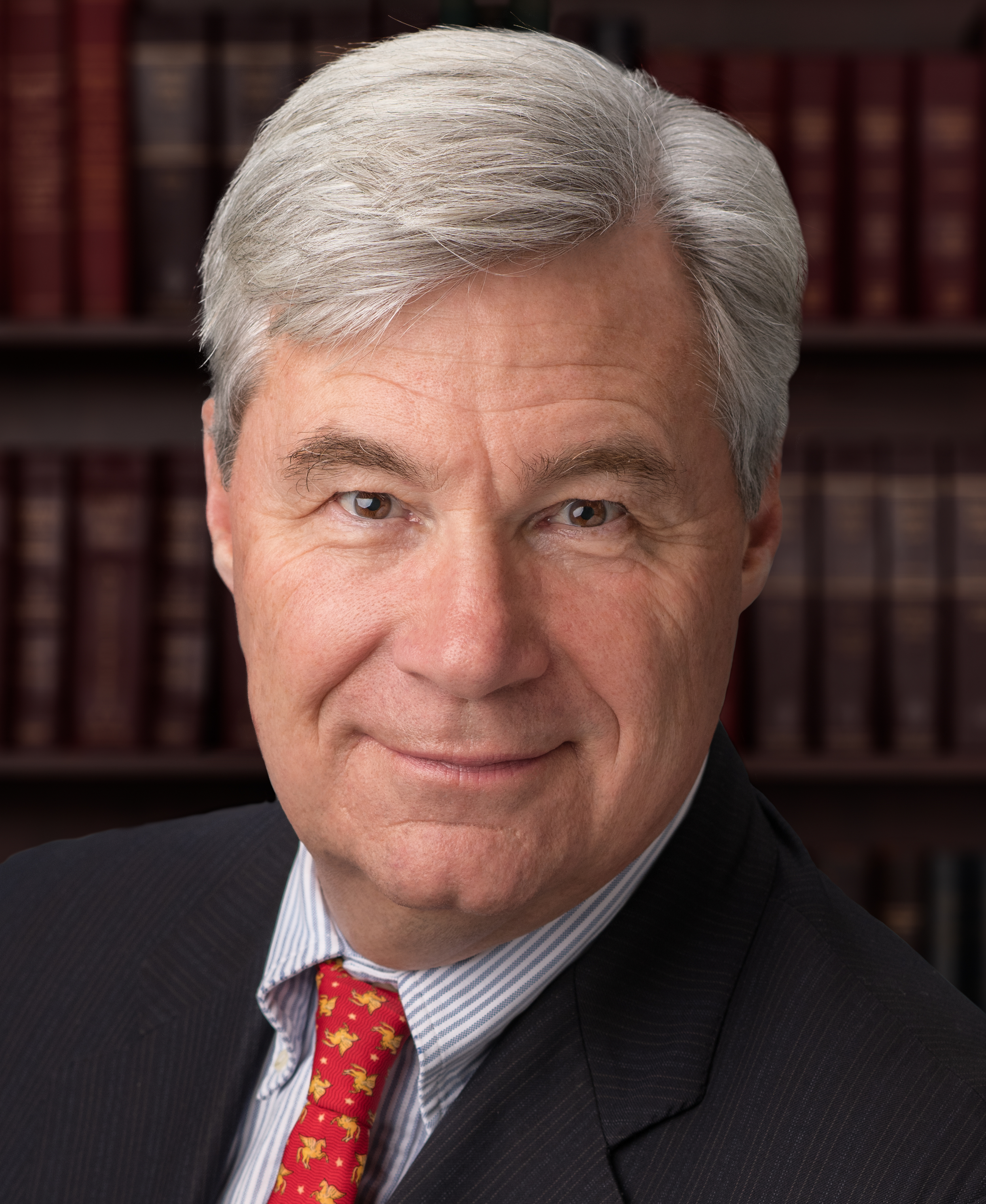
Sheldon Whitehouse (D)

(ordered by seniority)

Rhode Island ratified the United States Constitution on May 29, 1790 and elects its U.S. senators to class 1 and class 2. The state's current U.S. senators are Democrats Jack Reed (since 1997) and Sheldon Whitehouse (since 2007). Claiborne Pell was Rhode Island's longest-serving senator (1961–1997).

== List of senators ==
Class 1 Class 1 senators belong to the electoral cycle that most recently had regular elections in 2006, 2012, 2018, and 2024. The next election will be in 2030.						C	Class 2 Class 2 senators belong to the electoral cycle that most recently had regular elections in 2008, 2014, 2020, and 2026. The next election will be in 2032.					
#	Senator	Party	Dates in office	Electoral history	T	C	T	Electoral history	Dates in office	Party	Senator	#
Vacant			May 29, 1790 – Jun 12, 1790	Rhode Island did not elect its U.S. senators until Jun 7, 1790.	1	1st	1	Rhode Island did not elect its U.S. senators until Jun 7, 1790.	May 29, 1790 – Jun 12, 1790	Vacant		
1	Theodore Foster (Providence)	Pro- Admin.	Jun 12, 1790 – Mar 3, 1803	Elected in 1790.	1	1st	1	Elected in 1790.	Jun 12, 1790 – Mar 3, 1793	Anti-Admin.	Joseph Stanton Jr. (Washington County)	1
1	Theodore Foster (Providence)	Pro- Admin.	Jun 12, 1790 – Mar 3, 1803	Re-elected in 1791.	2	2nd	1	Elected in 1790.	Jun 12, 1790 – Mar 3, 1793	Anti-Admin.	Joseph Stanton Jr. (Washington County)	1
1	Theodore Foster (Providence)	Pro- Admin.	Jun 12, 1790 – Mar 3, 1803	Re-elected in 1791.	2	3rd	2	Elected in 1793. Resigned.	Mar 4, 1793 – Oct 1797	Pro-Admin.	William Bradford (Bristol)	2
1	Theodore Foster (Providence)	Federalist	Jun 12, 1790 – Mar 3, 1803	Re-elected in 1791.	2	4th	2	Elected in 1793. Resigned.	Mar 4, 1793 – Oct 1797	Federalist	William Bradford (Bristol)	2
1	Theodore Foster (Providence)	Federalist	Jun 12, 1790 – Mar 3, 1803	Re-elected in 1797. Retired.	3	5th	2	Elected in 1793. Resigned.	Mar 4, 1793 – Oct 1797	Federalist	William Bradford (Bristol)	2
1	Theodore Foster (Providence)	Federalist	Jun 12, 1790 – Mar 3, 1803	Re-elected in 1797. Retired.	3	5th	2		Oct 1797 – Nov 13, 1797	Vacant		
1	Theodore Foster (Providence)	Federalist	Jun 12, 1790 – Mar 3, 1803	Re-elected in 1797. Retired.	3	5th	2	Elected in 1797 to finish Bradford's term.	Nov 13, 1797 – Mar 5, 1801	Federalist	Ray Greene (Providence)	3
1	Theodore Foster (Providence)	Federalist	Jun 12, 1790 – Mar 3, 1803	Re-elected in 1797. Retired.	3	6th	3	Re-elected in 1798. Resigned.	Nov 13, 1797 – Mar 5, 1801	Federalist	Ray Greene (Providence)	3
1	Theodore Foster (Providence)	Federalist	Jun 12, 1790 – Mar 3, 1803	Re-elected in 1797. Retired.	3	7th	3	Re-elected in 1798. Resigned.	Nov 13, 1797 – Mar 5, 1801	Federalist	Ray Greene (Providence)	3
1	Theodore Foster (Providence)	Federalist	Jun 12, 1790 – Mar 3, 1803	Re-elected in 1797. Retired.	3	7th	3		Mar 5, 1801 – May 6, 1801	Vacant		
1	Theodore Foster (Providence)	Federalist	Jun 12, 1790 – Mar 3, 1803	Re-elected in 1797. Retired.	3	7th	3	Elected in 1801 to finish Greene's term. Lost re-election.	May 6, 1801 – Mar 3, 1805	Democratic- Republican	Christopher Ellery (Newport)	4
2	Samuel J. Potter (South Kingstown)	Democratic- Republican	Mar 4, 1803 – Sep 26, 1804	Elected in 1802. Died.	4	8th	3	Elected in 1801 to finish Greene's term. Lost re-election.	May 6, 1801 – Mar 3, 1805	Democratic- Republican	Christopher Ellery (Newport)	4
Vacant			Sep 26, 1804 – Oct 29, 1804		4	8th	3	Elected in 1801 to finish Greene's term. Lost re-election.	May 6, 1801 – Mar 3, 1805	Democratic- Republican	Christopher Ellery (Newport)	4
3	Benjamin Howland (Tiverton)	Democratic- Republican	Oct 29, 1804 – Mar 3, 1809	Elected in 1804 to finish Potter's term. Retired.	4	8th	3	Elected in 1801 to finish Greene's term. Lost re-election.	May 6, 1801 – Mar 3, 1805	Democratic- Republican	Christopher Ellery (Newport)	4
3	Benjamin Howland (Tiverton)	Democratic- Republican	Oct 29, 1804 – Mar 3, 1809	Elected in 1804 to finish Potter's term. Retired.	4	9th	4	Elected in 1804. Resigned.	Mar 4, 1805 – Sep 1807	Democratic- Republican	James Fenner (Providence)	5
3	Benjamin Howland (Tiverton)	Democratic- Republican	Oct 29, 1804 – Mar 3, 1809	Elected in 1804 to finish Potter's term. Retired.	4	10th	4	Elected in 1804. Resigned.	Mar 4, 1805 – Sep 1807	Democratic- Republican	James Fenner (Providence)	5
3	Benjamin Howland (Tiverton)	Democratic- Republican	Oct 29, 1804 – Mar 3, 1809	Elected in 1804 to finish Potter's term. Retired.	4	10th	4		Sep 1807 – Oct 26, 1807	Vacant		
3	Benjamin Howland (Tiverton)	Democratic- Republican	Oct 29, 1804 – Mar 3, 1809	Elected in 1804 to finish Potter's term. Retired.	4	10th	4	Elected to finish Fenner's term.	Oct 26, 1807 – Mar 3, 1811	Democratic- Republican	Elisha Mathewson (Scituate)	6
4	Francis Malbone (Newport)	Federalist	Mar 4, 1809 – Jun 4, 1809	Elected in 1808. Died.	5	11th	4	Elected to finish Fenner's term.	Oct 26, 1807 – Mar 3, 1811	Democratic- Republican	Elisha Mathewson (Scituate)	6
Vacant			Jun 4, 1809 – Jun 26, 1809		5	11th	4	Elected to finish Fenner's term.	Oct 26, 1807 – Mar 3, 1811	Democratic- Republican	Elisha Mathewson (Scituate)	6
5	Christopher G. Champlin (Newport)	Federalist	Jun 26, 1809 – Oct 12, 1811	Elected in 1809 to finish Malbone's term. Resigned.	5	11th	4	Elected to finish Fenner's term.	Oct 26, 1807 – Mar 3, 1811	Democratic- Republican	Elisha Mathewson (Scituate)	6
5	Christopher G. Champlin (Newport)	Federalist	Jun 26, 1809 – Oct 12, 1811	Elected in 1809 to finish Malbone's term. Resigned.	5	12th	5	Elected in 1810. Retired.	Mar 4, 1811 – Mar 3, 1817	Democratic- Republican	Jeremiah B. Howell (Providence)	7
Vacant			Oct 12, 1811 – Oct 28, 1811		5	12th	5	Elected in 1810. Retired.	Mar 4, 1811 – Mar 3, 1817	Democratic- Republican	Jeremiah B. Howell (Providence)	7
6	William Hunter (Newport)	Federalist	Oct 28, 1811 – Mar 3, 1821	Elected in 1811 to finish Malbone's term.	5	12th	5	Elected in 1810. Retired.	Mar 4, 1811 – Mar 3, 1817	Democratic- Republican	Jeremiah B. Howell (Providence)	7
6	William Hunter (Newport)	Federalist	Oct 28, 1811 – Mar 3, 1821	Elected in 1811 to finish Malbone's term.	5	13th	5	Elected in 1810. Retired.	Mar 4, 1811 – Mar 3, 1817	Democratic- Republican	Jeremiah B. Howell (Providence)	7
6	William Hunter (Newport)	Federalist	Oct 28, 1811 – Mar 3, 1821	Re-elected in 1814.	6	14th	5	Elected in 1810. Retired.	Mar 4, 1811 – Mar 3, 1817	Democratic- Republican	Jeremiah B. Howell (Providence)	7
6	William Hunter (Newport)	Federalist	Oct 28, 1811 – Mar 3, 1821	Re-elected in 1814.	6	15th	6	Elected in 1816. Died.	Mar 4, 1817 – Dec 25, 1820	Federalist	James Burrill Jr. (Providence)	8
6	William Hunter (Newport)	Federalist	Oct 28, 1811 – Mar 3, 1821	Re-elected in 1814.	6	16th	6	Elected in 1816. Died.	Mar 4, 1817 – Dec 25, 1820	Federalist	James Burrill Jr. (Providence)	8
6	William Hunter (Newport)	Federalist	Oct 28, 1811 – Mar 3, 1821	Re-elected in 1814.	6	16th	6		Dec 25, 1820 – Jan 9, 1821	Vacant		
6	William Hunter (Newport)	Federalist	Oct 28, 1811 – Mar 3, 1821	Re-elected in 1814.	6	16th	6	Elected in 1821 to finish Burrill's term.	Jan 9, 1821 – Mar 3, 1841	Democratic- Republican	Nehemiah R. Knight (Providence)	9
7	James DeWolf (Bristol)	Democratic- Republican	Mar 4, 1821 – Oct 31, 1825	Election date unknown. Resigned.	7	17th	6	Elected in 1821 to finish Burrill's term.	Jan 9, 1821 – Mar 3, 1841	Democratic- Republican	Nehemiah R. Knight (Providence)	9
7	James DeWolf (Bristol)	Democratic- Republican	Mar 4, 1821 – Oct 31, 1825	Election date unknown. Resigned.	7	18th	7	Re-elected in 1823.	Jan 9, 1821 – Mar 3, 1841	Democratic- Republican	Nehemiah R. Knight (Providence)	9
7	James DeWolf (Bristol)	National; Republican	Mar 4, 1821 – Oct 31, 1825	Election date unknown. Resigned.	7	19th	7	Re-elected in 1823.	Jan 9, 1821 – Mar 3, 1841	National; Republican	Nehemiah R. Knight (Providence)	9
8	Asher Robbins (Newport)	National; Republican	Oct 31, 1825 – Mar 3, 1839	Elected in 1825 to finish DeWolf's term.	7	19th	7	Re-elected in 1823.	Jan 9, 1821 – Mar 3, 1841	National; Republican	Nehemiah R. Knight (Providence)	9
8	Asher Robbins (Newport)	National; Republican	Oct 31, 1825 – Mar 3, 1839	Re-elected in 1827.	8	20th	7	Re-elected in 1823.	Jan 9, 1821 – Mar 3, 1841	National; Republican	Nehemiah R. Knight (Providence)	9
8	Asher Robbins (Newport)	National; Republican	Oct 31, 1825 – Mar 3, 1839	Re-elected in 1827.	8	21st	8	Re-elected in 1829.	Jan 9, 1821 – Mar 3, 1841	National; Republican	Nehemiah R. Knight (Providence)	9
8	Asher Robbins (Newport)	National; Republican	Oct 31, 1825 – Mar 3, 1839	Re-elected in 1827.	8	22nd	8	Re-elected in 1829.	Jan 9, 1821 – Mar 3, 1841	National; Republican	Nehemiah R. Knight (Providence)	9
8	Asher Robbins (Newport)	National; Republican	Oct 31, 1825 – Mar 3, 1839	Re-elected in 1833. [data missing]	9	23rd	8	Re-elected in 1829.	Jan 9, 1821 – Mar 3, 1841	National; Republican	Nehemiah R. Knight (Providence)	9
8	Asher Robbins (Newport)	National; Republican	Oct 31, 1825 – Mar 3, 1839	Re-elected in 1833. [data missing]	9	24th	9	Re-elected in 1835. [data missing]	Jan 9, 1821 – Mar 3, 1841	National; Republican	Nehemiah R. Knight (Providence)	9
8	Asher Robbins (Newport)	Whig	Oct 31, 1825 – Mar 3, 1839	Re-elected in 1833. [data missing]	9	25th	9	Re-elected in 1835. [data missing]	Jan 9, 1821 – Mar 3, 1841	Whig	Nehemiah R. Knight (Providence)	9
9	Nathan F. Dixon I (Westerly)	Whig	Mar 4, 1839 – Jan 29, 1842	Election date unknown. Died.	10	26th	9	Re-elected in 1835. [data missing]	Jan 9, 1821 – Mar 3, 1841	Whig	Nehemiah R. Knight (Providence)	9
9	Nathan F. Dixon I (Westerly)	Whig	Mar 4, 1839 – Jan 29, 1842	Election date unknown. Died.	10	27th	10	Elected in 1841. Lost re-election.	Mar 4, 1841 – Mar 3, 1847	Whig	James F. Simmons (Providence)	10
Vacant			Jan 29, 1842 – Feb 18, 1842		10	27th	10	Elected in 1841. Lost re-election.	Mar 4, 1841 – Mar 3, 1847	Whig	James F. Simmons (Providence)	10
10	William Sprague III (West Warwick)	Whig	Feb 18, 1842 – Jan 17, 1844	Elected in 1842 to finish Dixon's term. Resigned.	10	27th	10	Elected in 1841. Lost re-election.	Mar 4, 1841 – Mar 3, 1847	Whig	James F. Simmons (Providence)	10
10	William Sprague III (West Warwick)	Whig	Feb 18, 1842 – Jan 17, 1844	Elected in 1842 to finish Dixon's term. Resigned.	10	28th	10	Elected in 1841. Lost re-election.	Mar 4, 1841 – Mar 3, 1847	Whig	James F. Simmons (Providence)	10
Vacant			Jan 17, 1844 – Jan 25, 1844		10	28th	10	Elected in 1841. Lost re-election.	Mar 4, 1841 – Mar 3, 1847	Whig	James F. Simmons (Providence)	10
11	John Brown Francis (Providence)	Law and Order	Jan 25, 1844 – Mar 3, 1845	Elected in 1844 to finish Sprague's term. Retired.	10	28th	10	Elected in 1841. Lost re-election.	Mar 4, 1841 – Mar 3, 1847	Whig	James F. Simmons (Providence)	10
12	Albert C. Greene (Providence)	Whig	Mar 4, 1845 – Mar 3, 1851	Election date unknown. Retired.	11	29th	10	Elected in 1841. Lost re-election.	Mar 4, 1841 – Mar 3, 1847	Whig	James F. Simmons (Providence)	10
12	Albert C. Greene (Providence)	Whig	Mar 4, 1845 – Mar 3, 1851	Election date unknown. Retired.	11	30th	11	Election date unknown. [data missing]	Mar 4, 1847 – Mar 3, 1853	Whig	John Hopkins Clarke (Providence)	11
12	Albert C. Greene (Providence)	Whig	Mar 4, 1845 – Mar 3, 1851	Election date unknown. Retired.	11	31st	11	Election date unknown. [data missing]	Mar 4, 1847 – Mar 3, 1853	Whig	John Hopkins Clarke (Providence)	11
13	Charles T. James (Providence)	Democratic	Mar 4, 1851 – Mar 3, 1857	Election date unknown. Retired.	12	32nd	11	Election date unknown. [data missing]	Mar 4, 1847 – Mar 3, 1853	Whig	John Hopkins Clarke (Providence)	11
13	Charles T. James (Providence)	Democratic	Mar 4, 1851 – Mar 3, 1857	Election date unknown. Retired.	12	33rd	12		Mar 4, 1853 – Jul 20, 1853	Vacant		
13	Charles T. James (Providence)	Democratic	Mar 4, 1851 – Mar 3, 1857	Election date unknown. Retired.	12	33rd	12	Elected late. Retired.	Jul 20, 1853 – Mar 3, 1859	Democratic	Philip Allen (Providence)	12
13	Charles T. James (Providence)	Democratic	Mar 4, 1851 – Mar 3, 1857	Election date unknown. Retired.	12	34th	12	Elected late. Retired.	Jul 20, 1853 – Mar 3, 1859	Democratic	Philip Allen (Providence)	12
14	James F. Simmons (Providence)	Republican	Mar 4, 1857 – Aug 15, 1862	Elected in 1856. Resigned.	13	35th	12	Elected late. Retired.	Jul 20, 1853 – Mar 3, 1859	Democratic	Philip Allen (Providence)	12
14	James F. Simmons (Providence)	Republican	Mar 4, 1857 – Aug 15, 1862	Elected in 1856. Resigned.	13	36th	13	Elected in 1858.	Mar 4, 1859 – Sep 2, 1884	Republican	Henry B. Anthony (Providence)	13
14	James F. Simmons (Providence)	Republican	Mar 4, 1857 – Aug 15, 1862	Elected in 1856. Resigned.	13	37th	13	Elected in 1858.	Mar 4, 1859 – Sep 2, 1884	Republican	Henry B. Anthony (Providence)	13
Vacant			Aug 15, 1862 – Dec 1, 1862		13	37th	13	Elected in 1858.	Mar 4, 1859 – Sep 2, 1884	Republican	Henry B. Anthony (Providence)	13
15	Samuel G. Arnold (Providence)	Constitutional Union	Dec 1, 1862 – Mar 3, 1863	Elected in 1862 to finish Simmons's term. [data missing]	13	37th	13	Elected in 1858.	Mar 4, 1859 – Sep 2, 1884	Republican	Henry B. Anthony (Providence)	13
16	William Sprague IV (Providence)	Republican	Mar 4, 1863 – Mar 3, 1875	Elected in 1862.	14	38th	13	Elected in 1858.	Mar 4, 1859 – Sep 2, 1884	Republican	Henry B. Anthony (Providence)	13
16	William Sprague IV (Providence)	Republican	Mar 4, 1863 – Mar 3, 1875	Elected in 1862.	14	39th	14	Re-elected in 1864.	Mar 4, 1859 – Sep 2, 1884	Republican	Henry B. Anthony (Providence)	13
16	William Sprague IV (Providence)	Republican	Mar 4, 1863 – Mar 3, 1875	Elected in 1862.	14	40th	14	Re-elected in 1864.	Mar 4, 1859 – Sep 2, 1884	Republican	Henry B. Anthony (Providence)	13
16	William Sprague IV (Providence)	Republican	Mar 4, 1863 – Mar 3, 1875	Re-elected in 1868. Retired.	15	41st	14	Re-elected in 1864.	Mar 4, 1859 – Sep 2, 1884	Republican	Henry B. Anthony (Providence)	13
16	William Sprague IV (Providence)	Republican	Mar 4, 1863 – Mar 3, 1875	Re-elected in 1868. Retired.	15	42nd	15	Re-elected in 1870.	Mar 4, 1859 – Sep 2, 1884	Republican	Henry B. Anthony (Providence)	13
16	William Sprague IV (Providence)	Republican	Mar 4, 1863 – Mar 3, 1875	Re-elected in 1868. Retired.	15	43rd	15	Re-elected in 1870.	Mar 4, 1859 – Sep 2, 1884	Republican	Henry B. Anthony (Providence)	13
17	Ambrose Burnside (Providence)	Republican	Mar 4, 1875 – Sep 13, 1881	Elected in 1874.	16	44th	15	Re-elected in 1870.	Mar 4, 1859 – Sep 2, 1884	Republican	Henry B. Anthony (Providence)	13
17	Ambrose Burnside (Providence)	Republican	Mar 4, 1875 – Sep 13, 1881	Elected in 1874.	16	45th	16	Re-elected in 1876.	Mar 4, 1859 – Sep 2, 1884	Republican	Henry B. Anthony (Providence)	13
17	Ambrose Burnside (Providence)	Republican	Mar 4, 1875 – Sep 13, 1881	Elected in 1874.	16	46th	16	Re-elected in 1876.	Mar 4, 1859 – Sep 2, 1884	Republican	Henry B. Anthony (Providence)	13
17	Ambrose Burnside (Providence)	Republican	Mar 4, 1875 – Sep 13, 1881	Re-elected in 1880. Died.	17	47th	16	Re-elected in 1876.	Mar 4, 1859 – Sep 2, 1884	Republican	Henry B. Anthony (Providence)	13
Vacant			Sep 13, 1881 – Oct 5, 1881		17	47th	16	Re-elected in 1876.	Mar 4, 1859 – Sep 2, 1884	Republican	Henry B. Anthony (Providence)	13
18	Nelson W. Aldrich (Providence)	Republican	Oct 5, 1881 – Mar 3, 1911	Elected in 1881 to finish Burnside's term.	17	47th	16	Re-elected in 1876.	Mar 4, 1859 – Sep 2, 1884	Republican	Henry B. Anthony (Providence)	13
18	Nelson W. Aldrich (Providence)	Republican	Oct 5, 1881 – Mar 3, 1911	Elected in 1881 to finish Burnside's term.	17	48th	17	Re-elected in 1882. Died.	Mar 4, 1859 – Sep 2, 1884	Republican	Henry B. Anthony (Providence)	13
18	Nelson W. Aldrich (Providence)	Republican	Oct 5, 1881 – Mar 3, 1911	Elected in 1881 to finish Burnside's term.	17	48th	17		Sep 2, 1884 – Nov 19, 1884	Vacant		
18	Nelson W. Aldrich (Providence)	Republican	Oct 5, 1881 – Mar 3, 1911	Elected in 1881 to finish Burnside's term.	17	48th	17	Appointed to continue Anthony's term.	Nov 19, 1884 – Jan 20, 1885	Republican	William P. Sheffield (Newport)	14
18	Nelson W. Aldrich (Providence)	Republican	Oct 5, 1881 – Mar 3, 1911	Elected in 1881 to finish Burnside's term.	17	48th	17	Elected in 1885 to finish Anthony's term.	Jan 20, 1885 – Apr 9, 1889	Republican	Jonathan Chace (Providence)	15
18	Nelson W. Aldrich (Providence)	Republican	Oct 5, 1881 – Mar 3, 1911	Elected in 1881 to finish Burnside's term.	17	49th	17	Elected in 1885 to finish Anthony's term.	Jan 20, 1885 – Apr 9, 1889	Republican	Jonathan Chace (Providence)	15
18	Nelson W. Aldrich (Providence)	Republican	Oct 5, 1881 – Mar 3, 1911	Re-elected in 1886.	18	50th	17	Elected in 1885 to finish Anthony's term.	Jan 20, 1885 – Apr 9, 1889	Republican	Jonathan Chace (Providence)	15
18	Nelson W. Aldrich (Providence)	Republican	Oct 5, 1881 – Mar 3, 1911	Re-elected in 1886.	18	51st	18	Re-elected in 1888. Resigned.	Jan 20, 1885 – Apr 9, 1889	Republican	Jonathan Chace (Providence)	15
18	Nelson W. Aldrich (Providence)	Republican	Oct 5, 1881 – Mar 3, 1911	Re-elected in 1886.	18	51st	18	Elected in 1889 to finish Chace's term. Retired.	Apr 10, 1889 – Mar 3, 1895	Republican	Nathan F. Dixon III (Westerly)	16
18	Nelson W. Aldrich (Providence)	Republican	Oct 5, 1881 – Mar 3, 1911	Re-elected in 1886.	18	52nd	18	Elected in 1889 to finish Chace's term. Retired.	Apr 10, 1889 – Mar 3, 1895	Republican	Nathan F. Dixon III (Westerly)	16
18	Nelson W. Aldrich (Providence)	Republican	Oct 5, 1881 – Mar 3, 1911	Re-elected in 1892.	19	53rd	18	Elected in 1889 to finish Chace's term. Retired.	Apr 10, 1889 – Mar 3, 1895	Republican	Nathan F. Dixon III (Westerly)	16
18	Nelson W. Aldrich (Providence)	Republican	Oct 5, 1881 – Mar 3, 1911	Re-elected in 1892.	19	54th	19	Elected in 1894.	Mar 4, 1895 – Mar 3, 1907	Republican	George P. Wetmore (Newport)	17
18	Nelson W. Aldrich (Providence)	Republican	Oct 5, 1881 – Mar 3, 1911	Re-elected in 1892.	19	55th	19	Elected in 1894.	Mar 4, 1895 – Mar 3, 1907	Republican	George P. Wetmore (Newport)	17
18	Nelson W. Aldrich (Providence)	Republican	Oct 5, 1881 – Mar 3, 1911	Re-elected in 1898.	20	56th	19	Elected in 1894.	Mar 4, 1895 – Mar 3, 1907	Republican	George P. Wetmore (Newport)	17
18	Nelson W. Aldrich (Providence)	Republican	Oct 5, 1881 – Mar 3, 1911	Re-elected in 1898.	20	57th	20	Re-elected in 1900.	Mar 4, 1895 – Mar 3, 1907	Republican	George P. Wetmore (Newport)	17
18	Nelson W. Aldrich (Providence)	Republican	Oct 5, 1881 – Mar 3, 1911	Re-elected in 1898.	20	58th	20	Re-elected in 1900.	Mar 4, 1895 – Mar 3, 1907	Republican	George P. Wetmore (Newport)	17
18	Nelson W. Aldrich (Providence)	Republican	Oct 5, 1881 – Mar 3, 1911	Re-elected Jan 18, 1905. Retired.	21	59th	20	Re-elected in 1900.	Mar 4, 1895 – Mar 3, 1907	Republican	George P. Wetmore (Newport)	17
18	Nelson W. Aldrich (Providence)	Republican	Oct 5, 1881 – Mar 3, 1911	Re-elected Jan 18, 1905. Retired.	21	60th	21	Legislature failed to elect.	Mar 4, 1907 – Jan 22, 1908	Vacant		17
18	Nelson W. Aldrich (Providence)	Republican	Oct 5, 1881 – Mar 3, 1911	Re-elected Jan 18, 1905. Retired.	21	60th	21	Elected in 1908 to finish the vacant term. Retired.	Jan 22, 1908– Mar 3, 1913	Republican	George P. Wetmore (Newport)	17
18	Nelson W. Aldrich (Providence)	Republican	Oct 5, 1881 – Mar 3, 1911	Re-elected Jan 18, 1905. Retired.	21	61st	21	Elected in 1908 to finish the vacant term. Retired.	Jan 22, 1908– Mar 3, 1913	Republican	George P. Wetmore (Newport)	17
19	Henry F. Lippitt (Providence)	Republican	Mar 4, 1911 – Mar 3, 1917	Elected in 1910. Lost re-election.	22	62nd	21	Elected in 1908 to finish the vacant term. Retired.	Jan 22, 1908– Mar 3, 1913	Republican	George P. Wetmore (Newport)	17
19	Henry F. Lippitt (Providence)	Republican	Mar 4, 1911 – Mar 3, 1917	Elected in 1910. Lost re-election.	22	63rd	22	Elected in 1913.	Mar 4, 1913 – Aug 18, 1924	Republican	LeBaron Bradford Colt (Bristol)	18
19	Henry F. Lippitt (Providence)	Republican	Mar 4, 1911 – Mar 3, 1917	Elected in 1910. Lost re-election.	22	64th	22	Elected in 1913.	Mar 4, 1913 – Aug 18, 1924	Republican	LeBaron Bradford Colt (Bristol)	18
20	Peter G. Gerry (Warwick)	Democratic	Mar 4, 1917 – Mar 3, 1929	Elected in 1916.	23	65th	22	Elected in 1913.	Mar 4, 1913 – Aug 18, 1924	Republican	LeBaron Bradford Colt (Bristol)	18
20	Peter G. Gerry (Warwick)	Democratic	Mar 4, 1917 – Mar 3, 1929	Elected in 1916.	23	66th	23	Re-elected in 1918. Died.	Mar 4, 1913 – Aug 18, 1924	Republican	LeBaron Bradford Colt (Bristol)	18
20	Peter G. Gerry (Warwick)	Democratic	Mar 4, 1917 – Mar 3, 1929	Elected in 1916.	23	67th	23	Re-elected in 1918. Died.	Mar 4, 1913 – Aug 18, 1924	Republican	LeBaron Bradford Colt (Bristol)	18
20	Peter G. Gerry (Warwick)	Democratic	Mar 4, 1917 – Mar 3, 1929	Re-elected in 1922. Lost re-election.	24	68th	23	Re-elected in 1918. Died.	Mar 4, 1913 – Aug 18, 1924	Republican	LeBaron Bradford Colt (Bristol)	18
20	Peter G. Gerry (Warwick)	Democratic	Mar 4, 1917 – Mar 3, 1929	Re-elected in 1922. Lost re-election.	24	68th	23		Aug 18, 1924 – Nov 4, 1924	Vacant		
20	Peter G. Gerry (Warwick)	Democratic	Mar 4, 1917 – Mar 3, 1929	Re-elected in 1922. Lost re-election.	24	68th	23	Elected in 1924 to finish Colt's term.	Nov 4, 1924 – Jan 3, 1937	Republican	Jesse H. Metcalf (Providence)	19
20	Peter G. Gerry (Warwick)	Democratic	Mar 4, 1917 – Mar 3, 1929	Re-elected in 1922. Lost re-election.	24	69th	24	Elected in 1924.	Nov 4, 1924 – Jan 3, 1937	Republican	Jesse H. Metcalf (Providence)	19
20	Peter G. Gerry (Warwick)	Democratic	Mar 4, 1917 – Mar 3, 1929	Re-elected in 1922. Lost re-election.	24	70th	24	Elected in 1924.	Nov 4, 1924 – Jan 3, 1937	Republican	Jesse H. Metcalf (Providence)	19
21	Felix Hebert (West Warwick)	Republican	Mar 4, 1929 – Jan 3, 1935	Elected in 1928. Lost re-election.	25	71st	24	Elected in 1924.	Nov 4, 1924 – Jan 3, 1937	Republican	Jesse H. Metcalf (Providence)	19
21	Felix Hebert (West Warwick)	Republican	Mar 4, 1929 – Jan 3, 1935	Elected in 1928. Lost re-election.	25	72nd	25	Re-elected in 1930 Lost re-election.	Nov 4, 1924 – Jan 3, 1937	Republican	Jesse H. Metcalf (Providence)	19
21	Felix Hebert (West Warwick)	Republican	Mar 4, 1929 – Jan 3, 1935	Elected in 1928. Lost re-election.	25	73rd	25	Re-elected in 1930 Lost re-election.	Nov 4, 1924 – Jan 3, 1937	Republican	Jesse H. Metcalf (Providence)	19
22	Peter G. Gerry (Providence)	Democratic	Jan 3, 1935 – Jan 3, 1947	Elected in 1934.	26	74th	25	Re-elected in 1930 Lost re-election.	Nov 4, 1924 – Jan 3, 1937	Republican	Jesse H. Metcalf (Providence)	19
22	Peter G. Gerry (Providence)	Democratic	Jan 3, 1935 – Jan 3, 1947	Elected in 1934.	26	75th	26	Elected in 1936.	Jan 3, 1937 – Jan 3, 1961	Democratic	Theodore F. Green (Providence)	20
22	Peter G. Gerry (Providence)	Democratic	Jan 3, 1935 – Jan 3, 1947	Elected in 1934.	26	76th	26	Elected in 1936.	Jan 3, 1937 – Jan 3, 1961	Democratic	Theodore F. Green (Providence)	20
22	Peter G. Gerry (Providence)	Democratic	Jan 3, 1935 – Jan 3, 1947	Re-elected in 1940. Retired.	27	77th	26	Elected in 1936.	Jan 3, 1937 – Jan 3, 1961	Democratic	Theodore F. Green (Providence)	20
22	Peter G. Gerry (Providence)	Democratic	Jan 3, 1935 – Jan 3, 1947	Re-elected in 1940. Retired.	27	78th	27	Re-elected in 1942.	Jan 3, 1937 – Jan 3, 1961	Democratic	Theodore F. Green (Providence)	20
22	Peter G. Gerry (Providence)	Democratic	Jan 3, 1935 – Jan 3, 1947	Re-elected in 1940. Retired.	27	79th	27	Re-elected in 1942.	Jan 3, 1937 – Jan 3, 1961	Democratic	Theodore F. Green (Providence)	20
23	J. Howard McGrath (Providence)	Democratic	Jan 3, 1947 – Aug 23, 1949	Elected in 1946. Resigned to become U.S. Attorney General.	28	80th	27	Re-elected in 1942.	Jan 3, 1937 – Jan 3, 1961	Democratic	Theodore F. Green (Providence)	20
23	J. Howard McGrath (Providence)	Democratic	Jan 3, 1947 – Aug 23, 1949	Elected in 1946. Resigned to become U.S. Attorney General.	28	81st	28	Re-elected in 1948.	Jan 3, 1937 – Jan 3, 1961	Democratic	Theodore F. Green (Providence)	20
24	Edward L. Leahy (Bristol)	Democratic	Aug 24, 1949 – Dec 10, 1950	Appointed to continue McGrath's term. Retired.	28	81st	28	Re-elected in 1948.	Jan 3, 1937 – Jan 3, 1961	Democratic	Theodore F. Green (Providence)	20
Vacant			Dec 10, 1950 – Dec 19, 1950		28	81st	28	Re-elected in 1948.	Jan 3, 1937 – Jan 3, 1961	Democratic	Theodore F. Green (Providence)	20
25	John Pastore (Cranston)	Democratic	Dec 19, 1950 – Dec 28, 1976	Elected in 1950 to finish McGrath's term.	28	81st	28	Re-elected in 1948.	Jan 3, 1937 – Jan 3, 1961	Democratic	Theodore F. Green (Providence)	20
25	John Pastore (Cranston)	Democratic	Dec 19, 1950 – Dec 28, 1976	Elected in 1950 to finish McGrath's term.	28	82nd	28	Re-elected in 1948.	Jan 3, 1937 – Jan 3, 1961	Democratic	Theodore F. Green (Providence)	20
25	John Pastore (Cranston)	Democratic	Dec 19, 1950 – Dec 28, 1976	Re-elected in 1952.	29	83rd	28	Re-elected in 1948.	Jan 3, 1937 – Jan 3, 1961	Democratic	Theodore F. Green (Providence)	20
25	John Pastore (Cranston)	Democratic	Dec 19, 1950 – Dec 28, 1976	Re-elected in 1952.	29	84th	29	Re-elected in 1954. Retired.	Jan 3, 1937 – Jan 3, 1961	Democratic	Theodore F. Green (Providence)	20
25	John Pastore (Cranston)	Democratic	Dec 19, 1950 – Dec 28, 1976	Re-elected in 1952.	29	85th	29	Re-elected in 1954. Retired.	Jan 3, 1937 – Jan 3, 1961	Democratic	Theodore F. Green (Providence)	20
25	John Pastore (Cranston)	Democratic	Dec 19, 1950 – Dec 28, 1976	Re-elected in 1958.	30	86th	29	Re-elected in 1954. Retired.	Jan 3, 1937 – Jan 3, 1961	Democratic	Theodore F. Green (Providence)	20
25	John Pastore (Cranston)	Democratic	Dec 19, 1950 – Dec 28, 1976	Re-elected in 1958.	30	87th	30	Elected in 1960.	Jan 3, 1961 – Jan 3, 1997	Democratic	Claiborne Pell (Newport)	21
25	John Pastore (Cranston)	Democratic	Dec 19, 1950 – Dec 28, 1976	Re-elected in 1958.	30	88th	30	Elected in 1960.	Jan 3, 1961 – Jan 3, 1997	Democratic	Claiborne Pell (Newport)	21
25	John Pastore (Cranston)	Democratic	Dec 19, 1950 – Dec 28, 1976	Re-elected in 1964.	31	89th	30	Elected in 1960.	Jan 3, 1961 – Jan 3, 1997	Democratic	Claiborne Pell (Newport)	21
25	John Pastore (Cranston)	Democratic	Dec 19, 1950 – Dec 28, 1976	Re-elected in 1964.	31	90th	31	Re-elected in 1966.	Jan 3, 1961 – Jan 3, 1997	Democratic	Claiborne Pell (Newport)	21
25	John Pastore (Cranston)	Democratic	Dec 19, 1950 – Dec 28, 1976	Re-elected in 1964.	31	91st	31	Re-elected in 1966.	Jan 3, 1961 – Jan 3, 1997	Democratic	Claiborne Pell (Newport)	21
25	John Pastore (Cranston)	Democratic	Dec 19, 1950 – Dec 28, 1976	Re-elected in 1970. Retired and resigned early to give successor preferential seniority.	32	92nd	31	Re-elected in 1966.	Jan 3, 1961 – Jan 3, 1997	Democratic	Claiborne Pell (Newport)	21
25	John Pastore (Cranston)	Democratic	Dec 19, 1950 – Dec 28, 1976	Re-elected in 1970. Retired and resigned early to give successor preferential seniority.	32	93rd	32	Re-elected in 1972.	Jan 3, 1961 – Jan 3, 1997	Democratic	Claiborne Pell (Newport)	21
25	John Pastore (Cranston)	Democratic	Dec 19, 1950 – Dec 28, 1976	Re-elected in 1970. Retired and resigned early to give successor preferential seniority.	32	94th	32	Re-elected in 1972.	Jan 3, 1961 – Jan 3, 1997	Democratic	Claiborne Pell (Newport)	21
26	John Chafee (Warwick)	Republican	Dec 29, 1976 – Oct 24, 1999	Appointed to finish Pastore's term, having been elected to the next term.	32	94th	32	Re-elected in 1972.	Jan 3, 1961 – Jan 3, 1997	Democratic	Claiborne Pell (Newport)	21
26	John Chafee (Warwick)	Republican	Dec 29, 1976 – Oct 24, 1999	Elected in 1976.	33	95th	32	Re-elected in 1972.	Jan 3, 1961 – Jan 3, 1997	Democratic	Claiborne Pell (Newport)	21
26	John Chafee (Warwick)	Republican	Dec 29, 1976 – Oct 24, 1999	Elected in 1976.	33	96th	33	Re-elected in 1978.	Jan 3, 1961 – Jan 3, 1997	Democratic	Claiborne Pell (Newport)	21
26	John Chafee (Warwick)	Republican	Dec 29, 1976 – Oct 24, 1999	Elected in 1976.	33	97th	33	Re-elected in 1978.	Jan 3, 1961 – Jan 3, 1997	Democratic	Claiborne Pell (Newport)	21
26	John Chafee (Warwick)	Republican	Dec 29, 1976 – Oct 24, 1999	Re-elected in 1982.	34	98th	33	Re-elected in 1978.	Jan 3, 1961 – Jan 3, 1997	Democratic	Claiborne Pell (Newport)	21
26	John Chafee (Warwick)	Republican	Dec 29, 1976 – Oct 24, 1999	Re-elected in 1982.	34	99th	34	Re-elected in 1984.	Jan 3, 1961 – Jan 3, 1997	Democratic	Claiborne Pell (Newport)	21
26	John Chafee (Warwick)	Republican	Dec 29, 1976 – Oct 24, 1999	Re-elected in 1982.	34	100th	34	Re-elected in 1984.	Jan 3, 1961 – Jan 3, 1997	Democratic	Claiborne Pell (Newport)	21
26	John Chafee (Warwick)	Republican	Dec 29, 1976 – Oct 24, 1999	Re-elected in 1988.	35	101st	34	Re-elected in 1984.	Jan 3, 1961 – Jan 3, 1997	Democratic	Claiborne Pell (Newport)	21
26	John Chafee (Warwick)	Republican	Dec 29, 1976 – Oct 24, 1999	Re-elected in 1988.	35	102nd	35	Re-elected in 1990. Retired.	Jan 3, 1961 – Jan 3, 1997	Democratic	Claiborne Pell (Newport)	21
26	John Chafee (Warwick)	Republican	Dec 29, 1976 – Oct 24, 1999	Re-elected in 1988.	35	103rd	35	Re-elected in 1990. Retired.	Jan 3, 1961 – Jan 3, 1997	Democratic	Claiborne Pell (Newport)	21
26	John Chafee (Warwick)	Republican	Dec 29, 1976 – Oct 24, 1999	Re-elected in 1994. Died. (Note: Chafee died after having already announced his intention to retire at the end of the term.)	36	104th	35	Re-elected in 1990. Retired.	Jan 3, 1961 – Jan 3, 1997	Democratic	Claiborne Pell (Newport)	21
26	John Chafee (Warwick)	Republican	Dec 29, 1976 – Oct 24, 1999	Re-elected in 1994. Died.	36	105th	36	Elected in 1996.	Jan 3, 1997 – present	Democratic	Jack Reed (Jamestown)	22
26	John Chafee (Warwick)	Republican	Dec 29, 1976 – Oct 24, 1999	Re-elected in 1994. Died.	36	106th	36	Elected in 1996.	Jan 3, 1997 – present	Democratic	Jack Reed (Jamestown)	22
Vacant			Oct 24, 1999 – Nov 2, 1999		36	106th	36	Elected in 1996.	Jan 3, 1997 – present	Democratic	Jack Reed (Jamestown)	22
27	Lincoln Chafee (Warwick)	Republican	Nov 2, 1999 – Jan 3, 2007	Appointed to finish his father's term.	36	106th	36	Elected in 1996.	Jan 3, 1997 – present	Democratic	Jack Reed (Jamestown)	22
27	Lincoln Chafee (Warwick)	Republican	Nov 2, 1999 – Jan 3, 2007	Elected in 2000 to a full term. Lost re-election.	37	107th	36	Elected in 1996.	Jan 3, 1997 – present	Democratic	Jack Reed (Jamestown)	22
27	Lincoln Chafee (Warwick)	Republican	Nov 2, 1999 – Jan 3, 2007	Elected in 2000 to a full term. Lost re-election.	37	108th	37	Re-elected in 2002.	Jan 3, 1997 – present	Democratic	Jack Reed (Jamestown)	22
27	Lincoln Chafee (Warwick)	Republican	Nov 2, 1999 – Jan 3, 2007	Elected in 2000 to a full term. Lost re-election.	37	109th	37	Re-elected in 2002.	Jan 3, 1997 – present	Democratic	Jack Reed (Jamestown)	22
28	Sheldon Whitehouse (Newport)	Democratic	Jan 3, 2007 – present	Elected in 2006.	38	110th	37	Re-elected in 2002.	Jan 3, 1997 – present	Democratic	Jack Reed (Jamestown)	22
28	Sheldon Whitehouse (Newport)	Democratic	Jan 3, 2007 – present	Elected in 2006.	38	111th	38	Re-elected in 2008.	Jan 3, 1997 – present	Democratic	Jack Reed (Jamestown)	22
28	Sheldon Whitehouse (Newport)	Democratic	Jan 3, 2007 – present	Elected in 2006.	38	112th	38	Re-elected in 2008.	Jan 3, 1997 – present	Democratic	Jack Reed (Jamestown)	22
28	Sheldon Whitehouse (Newport)	Democratic	Jan 3, 2007 – present	Re-elected in 2012.	39	113th	38	Re-elected in 2008.	Jan 3, 1997 – present	Democratic	Jack Reed (Jamestown)	22
28	Sheldon Whitehouse (Newport)	Democratic	Jan 3, 2007 – present	Re-elected in 2012.	39	114th	39	Re-elected in 2014.	Jan 3, 1997 – present	Democratic	Jack Reed (Jamestown)	22
28	Sheldon Whitehouse (Newport)	Democratic	Jan 3, 2007 – present	Re-elected in 2012.	39	115th	39	Re-elected in 2014.	Jan 3, 1997 – present	Democratic	Jack Reed (Jamestown)	22
28	Sheldon Whitehouse (Newport)	Democratic	Jan 3, 2007 – present	Re-elected in 2018.	40	116th	39	Re-elected in 2014.	Jan 3, 1997 – present	Democratic	Jack Reed (Jamestown)	22
28	Sheldon Whitehouse (Newport)	Democratic	Jan 3, 2007 – present	Re-elected in 2018.	40	117th	40	Re-elected in 2020.	Jan 3, 1997 – present	Democratic	Jack Reed (Jamestown)	22
28	Sheldon Whitehouse (Newport)	Democratic	Jan 3, 2007 – present	Re-elected in 2018.	40	118th	40	Re-elected in 2020.	Jan 3, 1997 – present	Democratic	Jack Reed (Jamestown)	22
28	Sheldon Whitehouse (Newport)	Democratic	Jan 3, 2007 – present	Re-elected in 2024.	41	119th	40	Re-elected in 2020.	Jan 3, 1997 – present	Democratic	Jack Reed (Jamestown)	22
28	Sheldon Whitehouse (Newport)	Democratic	Jan 3, 2007 – present	Re-elected in 2024.	41	120th	41	Re-elected in 2026.	Jan 3, 1997 – present	Democratic	Jack Reed (Jamestown)	22
28	Sheldon Whitehouse (Newport)	Democratic	Jan 3, 2007 – present	Re-elected in 2024.	41	121st	41	Re-elected in 2026.	Jan 3, 1997 – present	Democratic	Jack Reed (Jamestown)	22
To be determined in the 2030 election.					42	122nd	41	Re-elected in 2026.	Jan 3, 1997 – present	Democratic	Jack Reed (Jamestown)	22
To be determined in the 2030 election.					42	123rd	42	To be determined in the 2032 election.				

== See also ==
- Elections in Rhode Island
- List of United States representatives from Rhode Island
- Rhode Island's congressional delegations
