= 1972 United States Senate election in Rhode Island =

- November 7, 1972
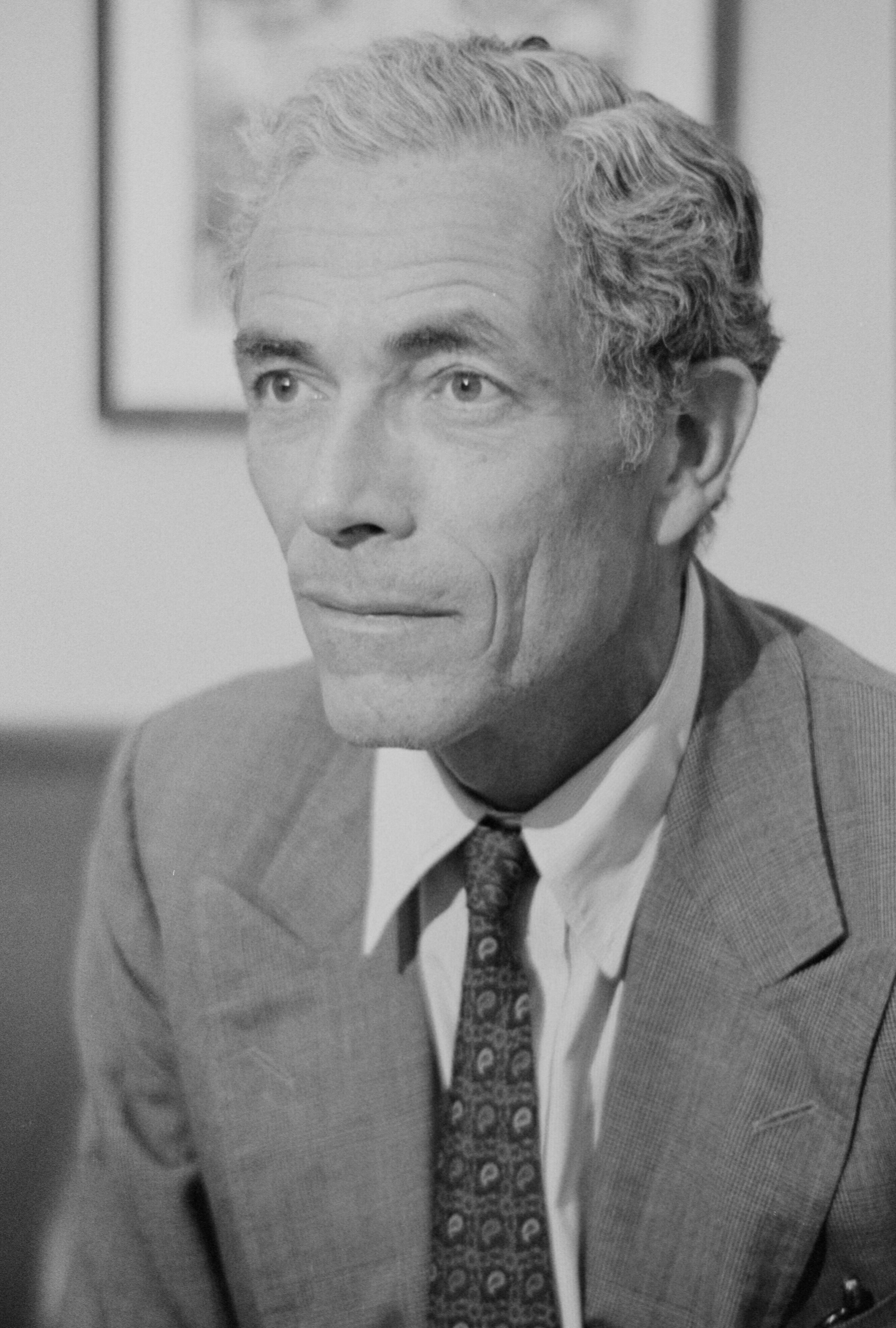

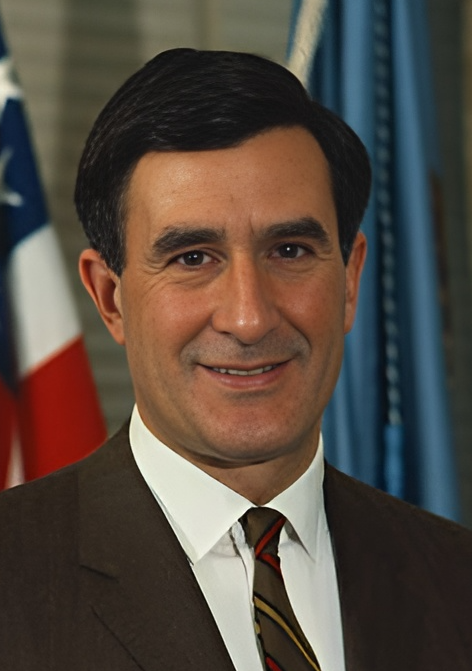
Nominee	Claiborne Pell	John Chafee
Party	Democratic	Republican
Popular vote	221,942	188,990
Percentage	53.68%	45.71%
- Pell: 40–50% 50–60% 60–70% Chafee: 40–50% 50–60% 60–70%
U.S. senator before election
Claiborne Pell
Democratic
Elected U.S. Senator
Claiborne Pell
Democratic

The 1972 United States Senate election in Rhode Island took place on November 7, 1972. Incumbent Democratic U.S. Senator Claiborne Pell successfully sought re-election, defeating Republican John Chafee in the closest race of Pell's Senate career. Chafee was elected to Rhode Island's other Senate seat in 1976, and was colleagues with Pell until the latter's retirement in 1996. This was Pell's only Senate election in which he won by single digits, and the only election in which he did not carry every county in Rhode Island. That same year, Rhode Island was one of fifteen states that voted for Republican President Richard Nixon in his landslide re-election victory, while simultaneously electing Democrats to the United States Senate.

== Democratic primary ==
=== Candidates ===
- Claiborne Pell, incumbent U.S. senator

== Republican primary ==
=== Candidates ===
- John Chafee, former governor of Rhode Island and former United States secretary of the Navy

== General election ==
=== Results ===
General election results
Party	Candidate	Votes	%
Democratic	Claiborne Pell (incumbent)	221,942	53.68%
Republican	John Chafee	188,990	45.71%
Independent	John Quattrocchi	2,041	0.49%
Socialist Workers	Patrick M. DeTemple	458	0.11%
Majority		32,952	7.97%
Total votes		413,431	100.00%
Democratic hold			
