= 1978 United States Senate election in Rhode Island =

- November 7, 1978
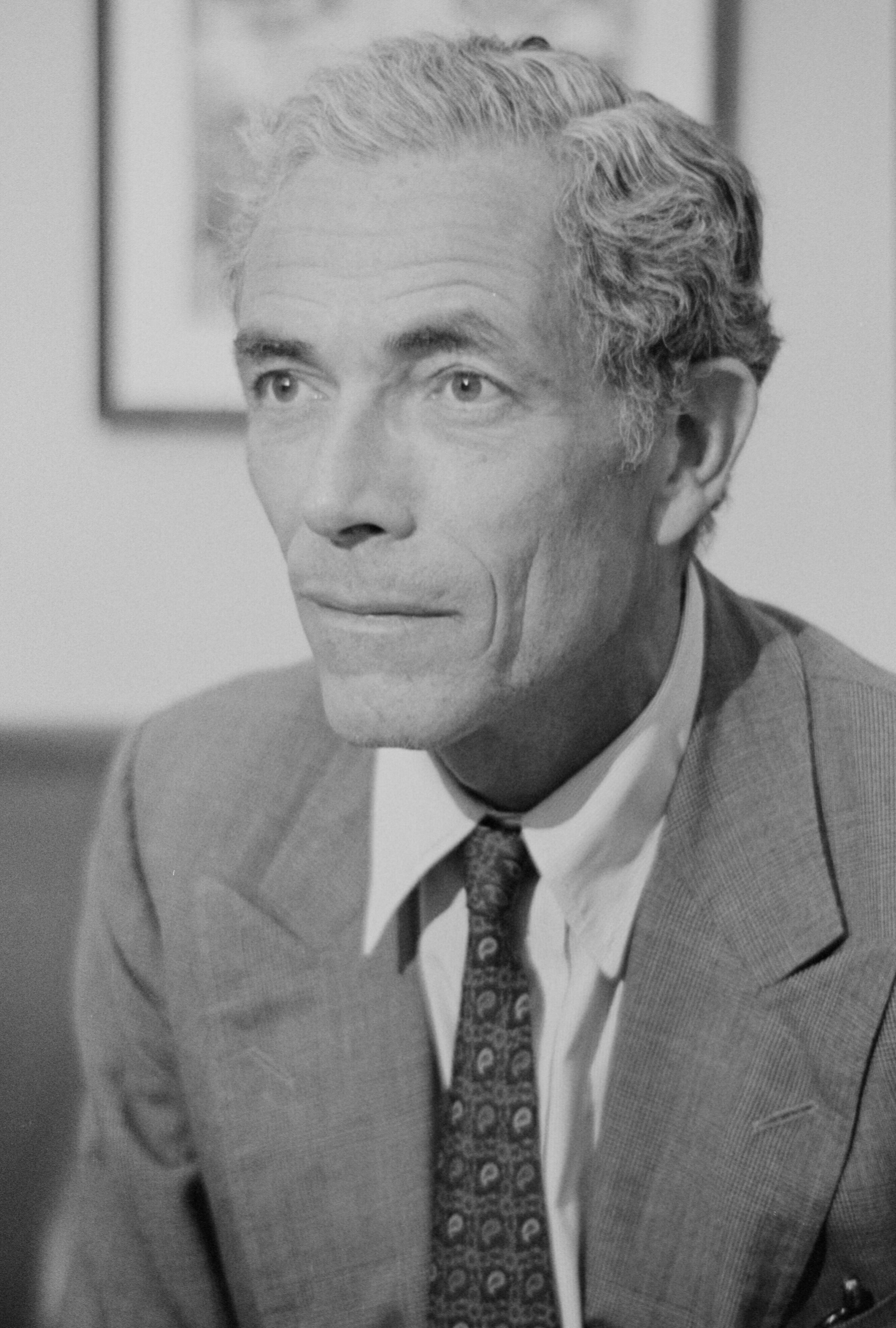

Nominee	Claiborne Pell	James Reynolds
Party	Democratic	Republican
Popular vote	229,557	76,061
Percentage	75.11%	24.89%
- Pell: 50–60% 60–70% 70–80% 80–90%
U.S. senator before election
Claiborne Pell
Democratic
Elected U.S. Senator
Claiborne Pell
Democratic

The 1978 United States Senate election in Rhode Island took place on November 7, 1978. Incumbent Democratic U.S. Senator Claiborne Pell successfully sought re-election, defeating Republican James G. Reynolds.

== Democratic primary ==
=== Candidates ===
- Claiborne Pell, incumbent U.S. Senator
- Raymond J. Greiner
- Francis P. Kelley

=== Results ===
Democratic primary results
Party	Candidate	Votes	%
Democratic	Claiborne Pell (incumbent)	69,729	87.01%
Democratic	Raymond J. Greiner	6,076	7.58%
Democratic	Francis P. Kelley	4,330	5.41%
Majority		63,653	79.43%
Total votes		80,135	100.00%

== Republican primary ==
=== Candidates ===
- James G. Reynolds

== General election ==
=== Results ===
General election results
Party	Candidate	Votes	%
Democratic	Claiborne Pell (incumbent)	229,557	75.11%
Republican	James Reynolds	76,061	24.89%
Majority		153,496	50.22%
Total votes		305,618	100.00%
Democratic hold			

== See also ==
- 1978 United States Senate elections
