= Claudine Schneider =

American politician (born 1947)

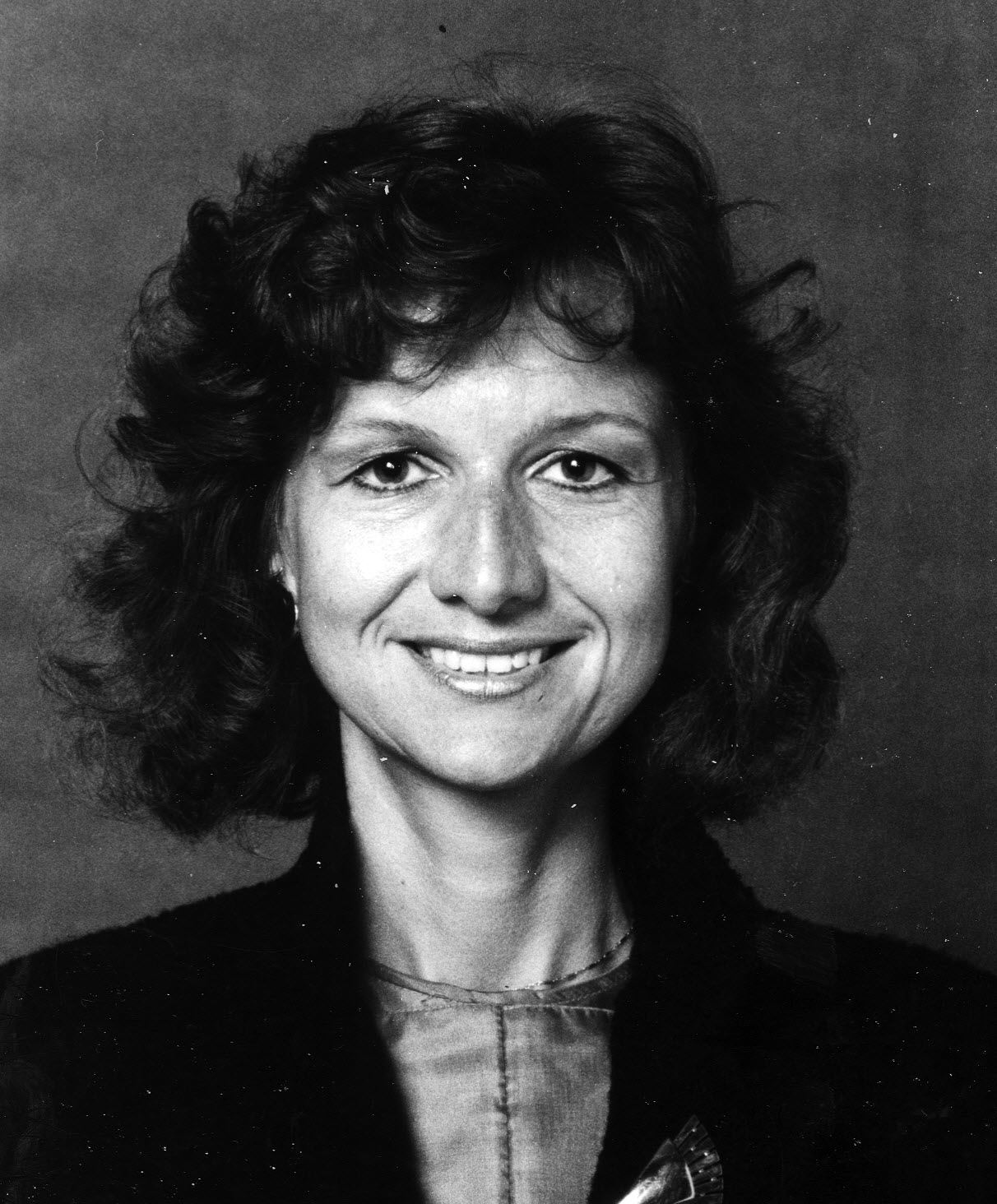

Member of the U.S. House of Representatives from Rhode Island's 2nd district
- In office January 3, 1981 – January 3, 1991
- Preceded by: Edward Beard
- Succeeded by: Jack Reed

Personal details
- Born: Claudine Cmarada; March 25, 1947 (age 79) Clairton, Pennsylvania, U.S.
- Party: Republican
- Spouse: Eric Schneider (m. 1972; div. 1985)
- Education: Rosemont College (attended); Windham College (BA); University of Rhode Island (attended)

Claudine Schneider (née Cmarada; born March 25, 1947) is an American politician and executive who served five terms as a Republican U.S. representative from Rhode Island from 1981 to 1991. She was the first, and to date only, woman elected to Congress from Rhode Island.

She is the founder of Republicans for Integrity, which describes itself as a network of "Republican former Members of Congress who feel compelled to remind Republican voters about the fundamentals of [the Republican] party and to provide the facts about incumbents' voting records."

== Life and career ==
Schneider was born Claudine Cmarada in Clairton, Pennsylvania. On her father's side, she is of Slovak descent. Schneider attended parochial schools. She studied at the University of Barcelona, Spain, and Rosemont College (Pennsylvania). She obtained a B.A. degree from Windham College (Vermont) in 1969. She also attended the University of Rhode Island Program in Community Planning. She married Eric Schneider in 1972 and they divorced in 1985.

She was the founder of the Rhode Island Committee on Energy in 1973, and was appointed executive director of the Conservation Law Foundation in 1974. She became Federal coordinator of Rhode Island Coastal Zone Management Program in 1978. She worked as a producer and host of a public affairs television program in Providence from 1978 to 1979.

=== Congress ===
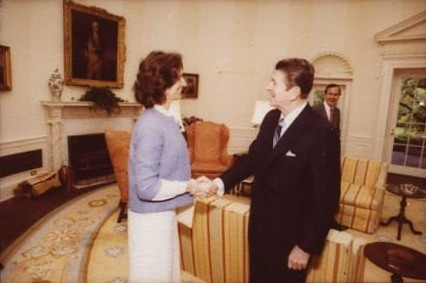
Schneider with President Ronald Reagan in 1981

Schneider was elected as a Republican to the 97th Congress and was re-elected to the four succeeding Congresses, serving from January 3, 1981, to January 3, 1991 for Rhode Island's 2nd congressional district.

==== Clean energy and climate change ====
Schneider’s hallmark legislative initiatives in Congress centered on promoting clean energy (especially energy efficiency) policies and preventing global warming through federal action and international cooperation. Her 1989 Global Warming Prevention Act established the goal of a 20% reduction in atmospheric CO_{2} levels from 1988 levels by 2000 through a mix of federal and state energy policies. This comprehensive omnibus bill was revenue-neutral and enjoyed bipartisan support from 144 Members of Congress. Although it did not pass into law in its entirety, two of the bill’s titles were subsequently incorporated into federal energy regulatory policies: creation of the nation’s first appliance energy efficiency standards (which became the Energy Star program) in the bill’s Title II and the creation of least-cost electric utility planning in the bill's Title I.

As a freshman Member of Congress in 1981, Schneider led a bipartisan House coalition and an unusual alliance of conservative groups and environmental advocacy organizations in opposition to the proposed Clinch River Breeder Reactor project during debate in the House Science Committee. In subsequent House floor debate on the project, she called it a “boondoggle” pushed by corporate special interests, costing taxpayers billions of dollars.

In 1984, Schneider introduced legislation to halt all fishing for striped bass to protect dwindling stocks of this popular sport fish along the U.S. Atlantic coast for three years. This bill kicked off the legislative process that resulted in the passage into law of the Atlantic Striped Bass Conservation Act of 1984, illustrating the “successes that can be achieved when state and federal agencies and Congress join forces to rebuild coastal fisheries.”

A longtime advocate of environmental protection and hazardous waste-prevention measures, Schneider was responsible in 1985 for creating the first economic incentive to reduce hazardous waste production. Her measure, the “waste-end” tax – was endorsed by the White House and included in the House version of the Superfund Bill.

Schneider was the prime Republican House sponsor of the Ocean Dumping Ban Act of 1988 to prohibit dumping of sewage sludge and industrial waste into the ocean after 1991.

Schneider’s other legislative initiatives included the cofounding of the Congressional Competitiveness Caucus in 1987 together with Hewlett Packard CEO John Young. The caucus hosted briefings by top corporate CEOs. In 1994, she was appointed by President Bill Clinton to the Competitiveness Policy Council.

In 1986, Schneider organized a series of television debates and exchanges between Members of Congress and the Soviet parliament (the Supreme Soviet) through satellite hookup between the capitals of the two superpowers. Initially dubbed “CongressBridge,” the goal of Schneider and her congressional colleague Rep. George Brown was “to break the 27-year public silence between Soviet and American politicians since the 1959 Moscow ‘kitchen debate’ between Richard Nixon and Nikita Khrushchev.” In the United States, the series of forums between the two countries’ legislators aired on ABC in 1987 as "Capital to Capital," and Schneider went on to receive an Emmy Award for her role in initiating and co-producing with Peter Jennings these live and unedited programs.

In 1988, Schneider sponsored legislation requiring U.S. cooperation with foreign countries on biodiversity and environmental protection. Her bill was signed into law on October 25, 1988, by President Ronald Reagan.

Noteworthy environmental and clean energy leaders who had worked on her Congressional staff include Ian Bowles, who later became Massachusetts Secretary of Energy and Environmental Affairs, and Michael P. Totten.

=== Senate campaign ===
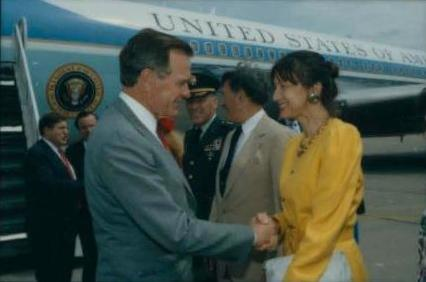
Schneider with President George H. W. Bush in 1990

She did not stand for re-election to her House seat in 1990, instead running in the concurrent U.S. Senate election. However, she was defeated by long-time incumbent Senator Claiborne Pell, losing 61.8% to 38.2%.

=== Later career ===
After leaving Congress, Schneider served as a member of the faculty of the John F. Kennedy School of Government of Harvard University.

In 1992, Schneider co-founded Energia Global, an international energy efficiency and renewable energy development company with a joint venture in Costa Rica, helping make it one of a handful of nearly carbon-neutral countries. Fulfilling a ten-year exit strategy, the company was sold to ERGA, which at the time was the world's largest producer of energy from renewable sources.

She then moved to Colorado and became the senior vice president of Econergy International, a multi-service energy and carbon markets consultancy and owner/operator of renewable energy projects throughout the Americas.

Schneider enlisted 50 Fortune 500 corporations, including Raytheon, Bank of America, Target and Tiffany’s, as partners in the U.S. Environmental Protection Agency’s (EPA) Climate Leaders Program, leading to her nomination by EPA as a “Climate Leader.”

Schneider has served on the boards of various companies and advocacy groups, and her consulting clients have included National Grid and other utilities, EPA, DOE, INBio (Costa Rica), the Policy Center for Marine Biosciences and Technology, Wheelabrator Technologies as well as the Smithsonian Institution and the U.S. Air Force.

Areas of focus throughout her consulting work include strategic planning, futures-scenario design, policy development and implementation, organizational development, ecological economics, lobbying, marketing and communications. She has provided keynote speeches at events around the world, occasionally in French or Spanish.

Schneider has contributed to numerous journals and books, including “The Planetary Interest’ from Oxford University Press, in which former elected officials from a variety of countries were asked to address a particular challenge. As the only American among the book’s contributors, she was commissioned to address “consumption."

In 2023 Schneider was one of six petitioners represented by Citizens for Responsibility and Ethics in Washington in Trump v. Anderson, a successful case before the Colorado Supreme Court, ruling Donald Trump ineligible for the 2024 presidential election on grounds of violating the 14th Amendment to the United States Constitution.^{[14][15]} The case went to the United States Supreme Court, which reversed the Colorado Supreme Court’s decision.

== See also ==
- Women in the United States House of Representatives

== Sources ==
- United States Congress. "Claudine Schneider (id: S000136)". Biographical Directory of the United States Congress.
- Appearances on C-SPAN

U.S. House of Representatives
| Preceded by Edward Beard | Member of the U.S. House of Representatives from Rhode Island's 2nd congressional district 1981–1991 | Succeeded by Jack Reed |
Party political offices
| Preceded by Barbara Leonard | Republican nominee for U.S. Senator from Rhode Island (Class 2); 1990 | Succeeded by Nancy Mayer |
U.S. order of precedence (ceremonial)
| Preceded by Brad Miller as Former U.S. Representative | Order of precedence of the United States as Former U.S. Representative | Succeeded by Anne Northup as Former U.S. Representative |
