= 1976 United States Senate election in Rhode Island =

- November 2, 1976
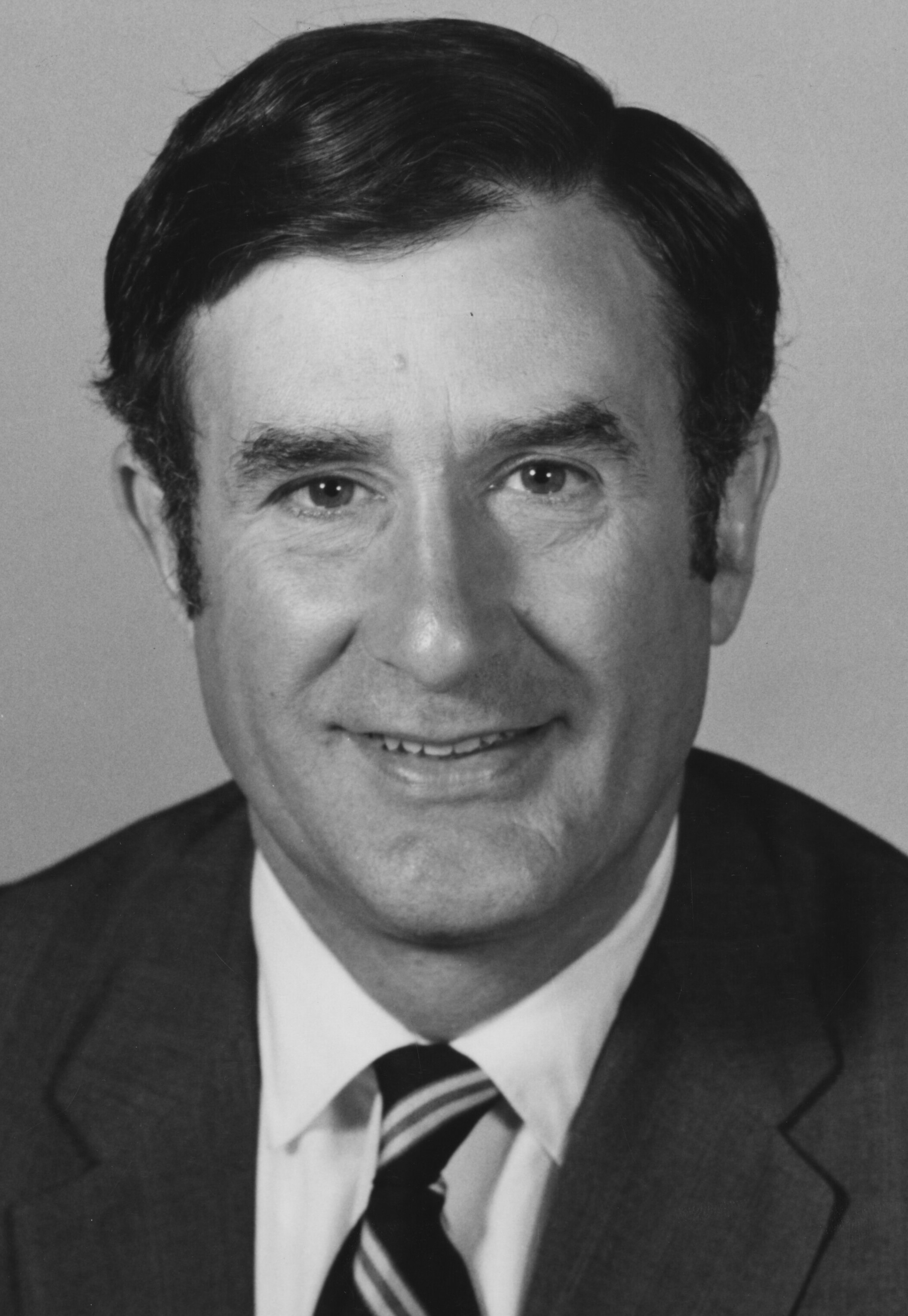

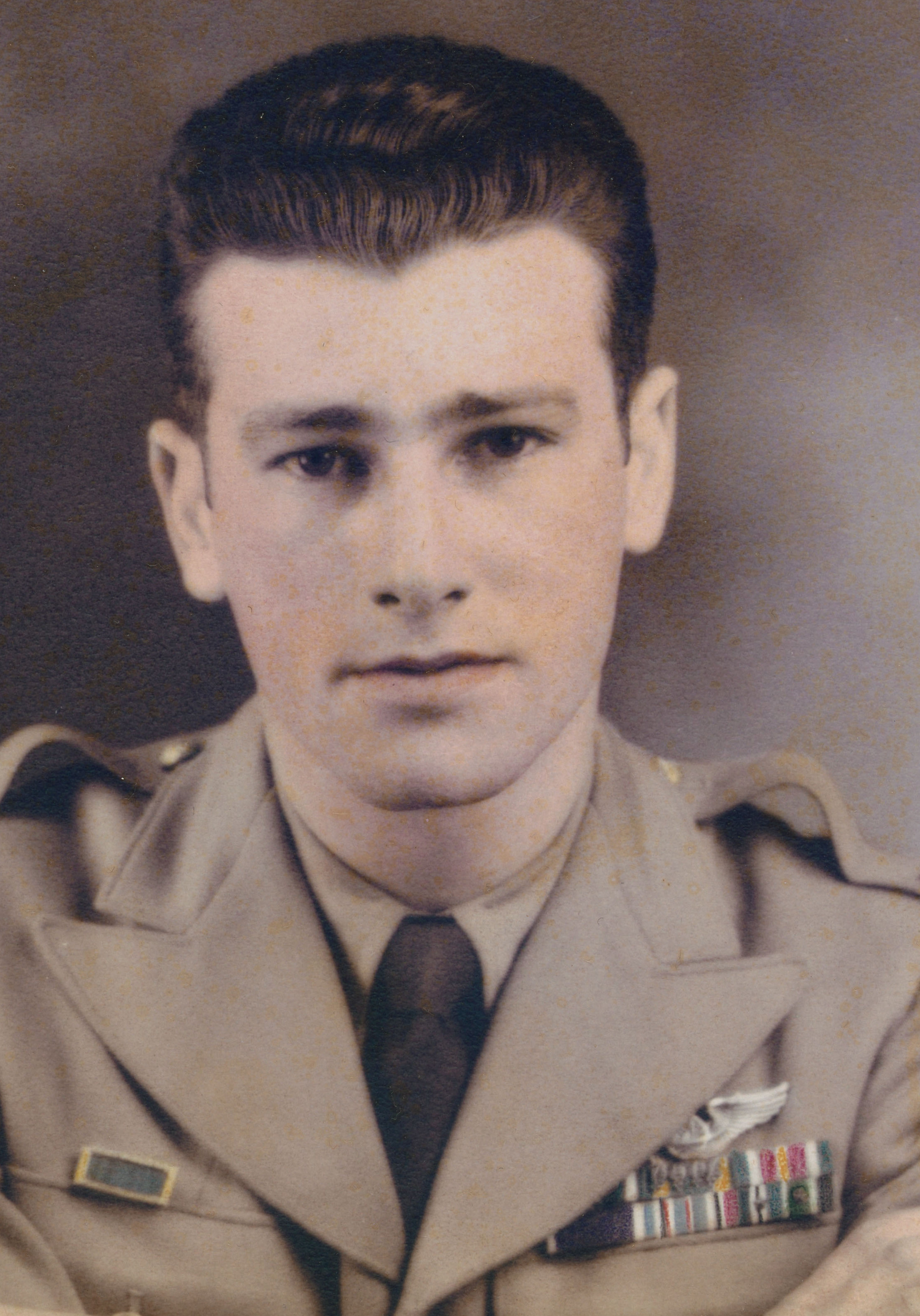
Nominee	John Chafee	Richard Lorber
Party	Republican	Democratic
Popular vote	230,329	167,665
Percentage	57.74%	42.03%
- Chafee: 50–60% 60–70% 70–80% Lorber: 50–60%
U.S. senator before election
John O. Pastore
Democratic
Elected U.S. Senator
John Chafee
Republican

The 1976 United States Senate election in Rhode Island took place on November 2, 1976. Incumbent Democratic U.S. Senator John O. Pastore did not seek re-election. Republican John Chafee won the seat, defeating Democrat Richard P. Lorber. Chafee was the first Republican to win a U.S. Senate race in Rhode Island since 1930.

== Democratic primary ==
=== Candidates ===
- John E. Caddick
- Paul E. Goulding
- John P. Hawkins, Rhode Island Senate Majority Leader
- Richard P. Lorber, car dealer and decorated World War II veteran
- Arthur E. Marley
- Philip W. Noel, Governor of Rhode Island
- Earl F. Pasbach
- Ralph J. Perrotta

=== Results ===
Incumbent Governor of Rhode Island Noel was favored in the primary but ultimately lost by 100 votes to the less known Lorber. This was partly due to the candidacy of Senate Majority leader John Hawkins, which split the establishment vote. Lorber was a political novice.

Democratic primary results
Party	Candidate	Votes	%
Democratic	Richard P. Lorber	60,118	37.78
Democratic	Philip W. Noel	60,018	37.71
Democratic	John P. Hawkins	25,456	16.00
Democratic	Paul E. Goulding	5,500	3.46
Democratic	Ralph J. Perrotta	4,481	2.82
Democratic	John E. Caddick	2,160	1.36
Democratic	Earl F. Pasbach	962	0.60
Democratic	Arthur E. Marley	447	0.28
Majority		100	0.06%
Total votes		159,142	100.00

== Republican primary ==
=== Candidates ===
- John Chafee, former U.S. Secretary of the Navy, former Governor and nominee for the United States Senate in 1972.

==== Declined ====
- Buddy Cianci, Mayor of Providence

== General election ==
=== Results ===
Republican Chafee defeated Lorber in a landslide with 58% of the vote, becoming the first Republican Senator from Rhode Island since 1930. Chafee would continue to be re-elected even as Rhode Island trended more Democratic into the 1990s, and he served until his death in 1999.

General election results
Party	Candidate	Votes	%
Republican	John Chafee	230,329	57.74
Democratic	Richard P. Lorber	167,665	42.03
Communist	Margaret Cann	912	0.23
Majority		62,664	15.71%
Total votes		398,906	100.00
Republican gain from Democratic			

== See also ==
- 1976 United States Senate elections
