= Claiborne Pell =

American politician (1918–2009)

Claiborne Pell GCC GCM
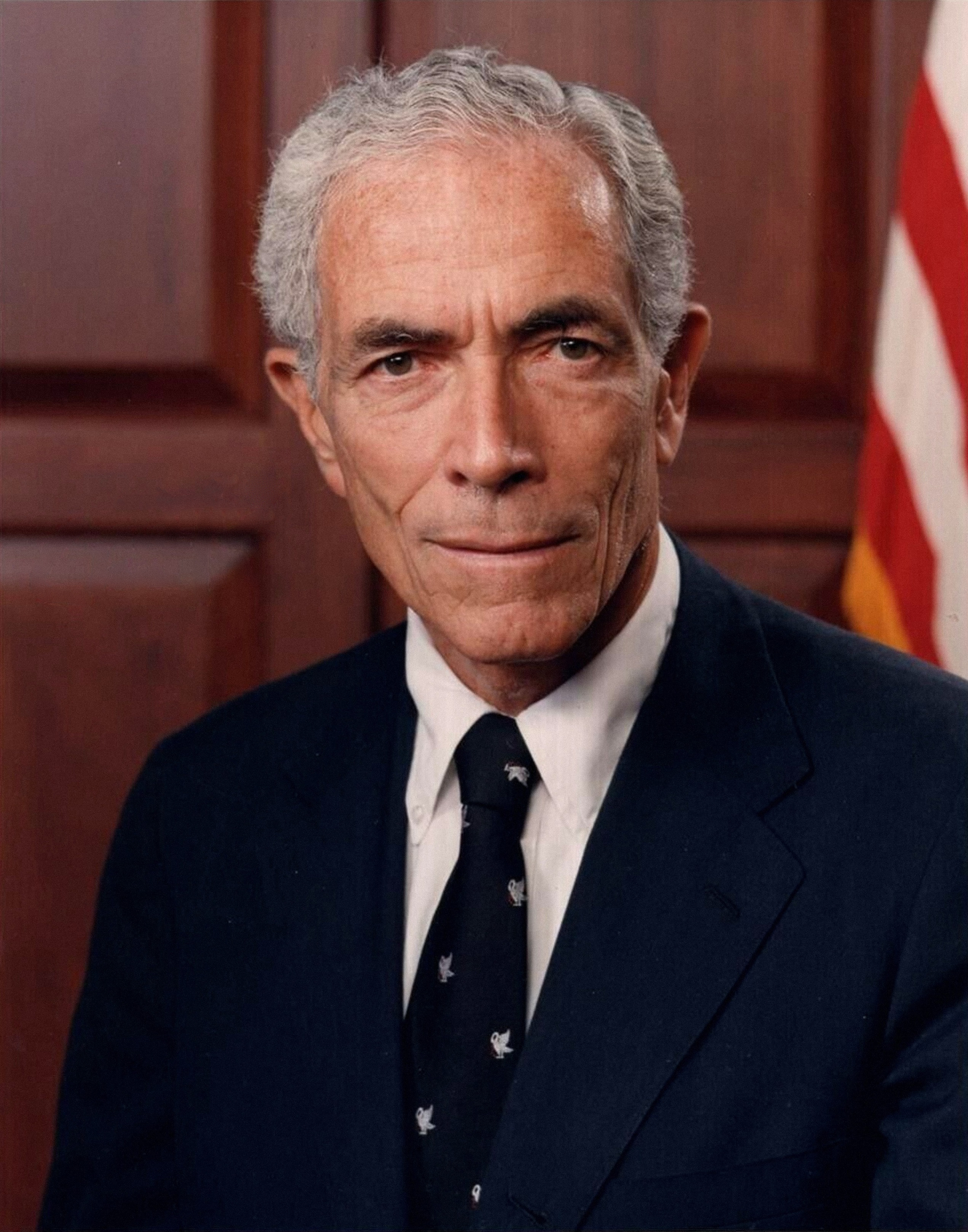

Chair of the Senate Foreign Relations Committee
- In office January 3, 1987 – January 3, 1995
- Preceded by: Richard Lugar
- Succeeded by: Jesse Helms

Chair of the Senate Rules Committee
- In office January 3, 1978 – January 3, 1981
- Preceded by: Howard Cannon
- Succeeded by: Charles Mathias

United States Senator from Rhode Island
- In office January 3, 1961 – January 3, 1997
- Preceded by: Theodore Green
- Succeeded by: Jack Reed

Personal details
- Born: Claiborne de Borda Pell; November 22, 1918 New York City, New York, U.S.
- Died: January 1, 2009 (aged 90) Newport, Rhode Island, U.S.
- Party: Democratic
- Spouse: Nuala O'Donnell (m. 1944)
- Children: 4
- Parent: Herbert Pell (father)
- Relatives: John Pell (ancestor); William C. C. Claiborne (great-great-great-granduncle); Clay Pell (grandson)
- Education: Princeton University (AB); Columbia University (MA)

Military service
- Allegiance: United States
- Branch/service: United States Coast Guard
- Years of service: 1941–1945 (active); 1945–1978 (reserve)
- Rank: Lieutenant (active); Captain (reserve)
- Unit: United States Coast Guard Reserve
- Battles/wars: World War II
- Claiborne Pell's voice Pell, as chair of the Senate Foreign Relations Committee, speaks in support of confirming James Baker as United States secretary of state Recorded January 25, 1989

Claiborne de Borda Pell GCC GCM (November 22, 1918 – January 1, 2009) was an American politician and writer who served as a U.S. senator from Rhode Island for six terms from 1961 to 1997. He was the sponsor of the 1972 bill that reformed the Basic Educational Opportunity Grant, which provides financial aid funding to American college students; the grant was given Pell's name in 1980 in honor of his work in education legislation.

A member of the Democratic Party, Pell remains the longest serving U.S. senator from Rhode Island.

== Early life and education ==
Claiborne Pell was born on November 22, 1918, in New York City, the son of Matilda Bigelow and diplomat and congressman Herbert Pell.

Pell's family members included John Francis Hamtramck Claiborne, George Mifflin Dallas, and Nathaniel Herbert Claiborne. He was a direct descendant of English mathematician John Pell and a descendant of Senator William C. C. Claiborne. The Congressional Record also reports that he was a direct descendant of Wampage I, a Siwanoy chieftain.

In 1927, Pell's parents divorced and his mother remarried Hugo W. Koehler of St. Louis, a commander in the United States Navy. Following World War I, Koehler served as an Office of Naval Intelligence and State Department operative in Russia during its civil war, and later as naval attaché to Poland. Said to be the "richest officer in the Navy" during the 1920s, Koehler was rumored to be the illegitimate son of Rudolf, Crown Prince of Austria and to have assisted the Romanovs to flee the Russian Empire following the Russian Revolution of 1917. Pell was close to his stepfather, who died when Pell was 22. In later years, he made a concerted effort to determine the veracity of the rumors surrounding Koehler's past, but was only partly successful.

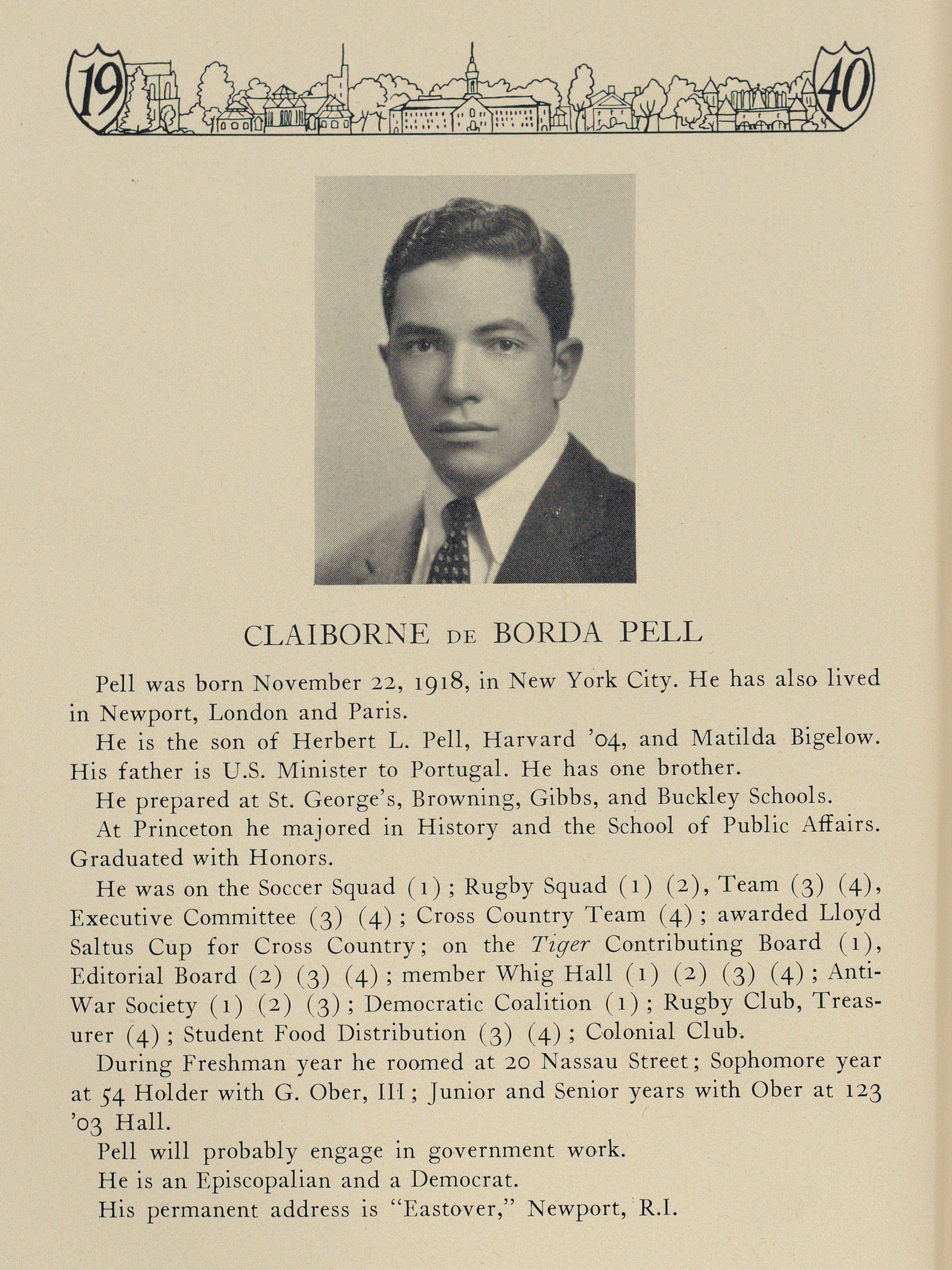
Pell in the Princeton University yearbook, 1940

Pell attended The Buckley School in New York City and St. George's School in Middletown, Rhode Island. He graduated with a Bachelor of Arts in history from Princeton University in 1940. Pell's senior thesis was titled "Macaulay and the Slavery Issue." While at Princeton, he was a member of Colonial Club and the American Whig-Cliosophic Society, and played on the rugby team.

== Post-college life ==
After graduating from Princeton, Pell worked as an oil field roustabout in Oklahoma. He then served as private secretary for his father, who was United States Ambassador to Portugal. At the start of World War II he was with his father, who was then United States Ambassador to Hungary. Claiborne Pell drove trucks carrying emergency supplies to prisoners of war in Germany, and was detained several times by the Nazi government.

=== Uniformed service ===
Pell enlisted in the U.S. Coast Guard as a seaman second class on August 12, 1941, four months before the Japanese attack on Pearl Harbor. Pell served as a ship's cook, was promoted to seaman first class on October 31, and then was commissioned as an ensign on December 17, 1941. During the war, Pell's ships served as North Atlantic convoy escorts, and also in amphibious warfare during the allied invasion of Sicily and the allied invasion of the Italian mainland.

Pell was promoted to lieutenant (junior grade) on October 1, 1942, and then to lieutenant in May 1943. Due to his fluency in Italian, Pell was assigned as a civil affairs officer in Sicily, where he became ill from drinking unpasteurized milk. He was sent home for recuperation during the summer of 1944, but returned to active service later in the war. Pell was discharged from active duty on September 5, 1945.

After the end of World War II, he remained in the U.S. Coast Guard Reserve. He attained the rank of captain and retired in 1978.

=== Personal life and family ===
In December 1944, Pell married Nuala O'Donnell, daughter of Charles Oliver O'Donnell and Josephine Hartford. They had four children: Herbert Claiborne Pell III, Christopher Thomas Hartford Pell, Nuala Dallas Pell, and Julia Lorillard Wampage Pell. Herbert (September 11, 1945 – September 24, 1999) and Julia (May 9, 1953 – April 13, 2006) predeceased their parents. His grandson Clay Pell (son of Herbert) was an unsuccessful contender in the 2014 Democratic primary for Governor of Rhode Island.

=== Diplomatic work, further education ===
From 1945 to 1952, he served in the United States Department of State as a Foreign Service Officer in Czechoslovakia, Italy, and Washington, D.C. He was fluent in French, Italian, and Portuguese.

In 1945, Pell was a participant in the United Nations Conference on International Organization in San Francisco that drafted the United Nations Charter.

In 1946 he completed graduate studies in International Relations at Columbia University and received a Master of Arts degree.

=== Post-diplomatic career ===
In 1954, Pell was appointed vice president and member of the board of directors of the International Fiscal Corporation. He also served as a vice president and director of the North American Newspaper Alliance. He was also a director of the Franklin D. Roosevelt Foundation, Fort Ticonderoga Association, and General Rochambeau Commission of Rhode Island. He also served as a fundraiser and consultant for the Democratic National Committee. He served as Vice President of the International Rescue Committee. Stationed in Austria, he was responsible for assisting refugees from the Hungarian Revolution of 1956 to leave the country and resettle.

During Pell's diplomatic career and other international activities in the 1940s and 1950s, he was arrested and jailed at least six times, including detentions by both fascist and communist governments.

== Political career ==
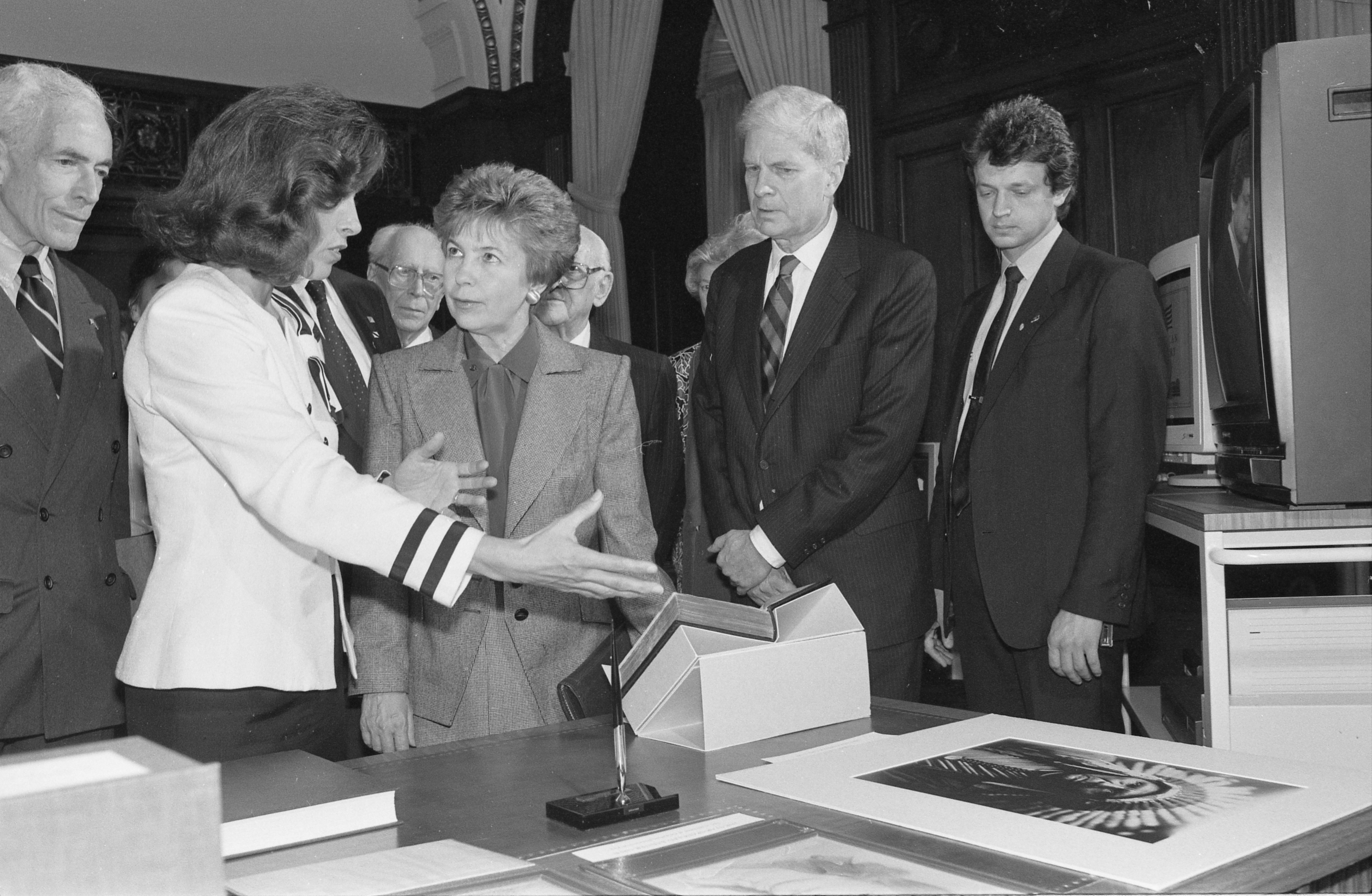
Pell watches as Raisa Gorbachev listens to Marilyn Quayle at a display of books and other items at the Library of Congress

In 1960, Pell won the seat of retiring U.S. Senator Theodore Francis Green, defeating former Governor Dennis J. Roberts and former Governor and U.S. Senator J. Howard McGrath in the Democratic primary, and former Rhode Island Republican Party Chairman Raoul Archambault in the general election.

Despite being called "the least electable man in America" by John F. Kennedy because of his many odd habits and beliefs, Pell proved a durable politician. He won reelection five times, including victories over Ruth M. Briggs in 1966, John Chafee in 1972, James G. Reynolds in 1978, Barbara Leonard in 1984, and Claudine Schneider in 1990.

Often considered by his opponents to be too easygoing, Pell demonstrated his effectiveness as a campaigner. During his first campaign, when he was accused of carpetbagging, Pell published newspaper advertisements featuring a photograph of his grand-uncle Duncan Pell, who had served as Lieutenant Governor of Rhode Island during the 1860s, thus demonstrating Pell's association with the state. When Briggs called him a "creampuff" during their 1966 campaign, Pell turned that to his advantage and mocked Briggs by obtaining an endorsement from a local baker's union.

During his first campaign, Pell also used his foreign experience to great advantage, impressing some largely immigrant audiences in person and on the radio by campaigning in their native languages.

=== Personality and beliefs ===
Pell was known for unusual beliefs and behaviors, including wearing threadbare suits, using public transportation and purchasing cheap used automobiles despite his wealth, and an interest in the paranormal. His interest in the paranormal was critiqued by author Martin Gardner: "In my opinion, however, no one in Washington has rivaled Senator Pell in combining of science with extreme gullibility toward the performances of psychics." He also wore his father's belt as a memento, despite the fact that Herbert Pell was stouter than the rail-thin Claiborne Pell, requiring Claiborne Pell to wrap the belt around his waist twice to make it fit. Pell would also wear unique clothing while jogging, including a tweed suit jacket. According to another story about Pell's eccentricities, at the conclusion of a meeting with Fidel Castro, Pell took Castro's cigar because he thought it was a gift for him.

=== Arrest allegation ===
In 1972's The Washington Pay-Off, author and former lobbyist Robert N. Winter-Berger wrote about Pell's alleged arrest during a raid on a Greenwich Village homosexual bar in 1964. Pell denied the allegation and there were no police records, witness statements or other sources to corroborate Winter-Berger. Despite legal advice to sue for defamation, Pell declined, deciding that it would draw undue publicity to the allegations.

=== Senate career ===
Pell voted in favor of the 24th Amendment to the U.S. Constitution, the Civil Rights Act of 1964, the Voting Rights Act of 1965, the Medicare program, the Civil Rights Act of 1968, and the confirmation of Thurgood Marshall to the U.S. Supreme Court.

Early in his Senate tenure, Pell was a major legislative sponsor of the National Sea Grant College Program in 1965 and 1966 that served to support marine research, and develop maritime industries. The Sea Grant program supported considerable growth of the oceanography and other marine science disciplines during the mid-20th Century.

Pell was largely responsible for the creation of "Basic Educational Opportunity Grants" in 1973, renamed Pell Grants in 1980, to provide financial aid funds to U.S. college students. Pell Grants initially provided for grants for prisoners, but Congress later eliminated that provision. For some years there was more money available than was applied for. Pell also co-sponsored the Family Education Rights & Privacy Act (abbreviated as FERPA), in 1974, with fellow Senator James Buckley of New York.

He was the main sponsor of the bill that created the National Endowment for the Arts and the National Endowment for the Humanities, and was active as an advocate for mass transportation initiatives and domestic legislation facilitating and conforming to the United Nations Convention on the Law of the Sea. Pell was one of twenty-five Senators to co-sponsor the Health Security Act, a bipartisan universal health care bill that advocated the creation of a health insurance program run by the federal government to provide coverage to every person in America.

Pell served as Chairman of the Senate Foreign Relations Committee from 1987 to 1995. In 1990 he was re-elected to his sixth and last term in the Senate.

In 1996, his last full year in the Senate, Pell voted against the Defense of Marriage Act, which banned the federal government from legally recognizing same-sex marriage.

Pell declined to seek re-election in 1996 and retired on January 3, 1997. Pell served in the Senate for thirty-six continuous years, making him the longest-serving U.S. Senator in the history of Rhode Island. He was succeeded by Jack Reed.

== Retirement and death ==
After retirement, Pell lived in Newport and was a communicant of St. Columba's Chapel in Middletown. He occasionally attended public functions of organizations with which he was affiliated. He was also a distinguished visiting professor at Salve Regina University. Towards the end of his life, he was diagnosed with Parkinson's disease.

Claiborne Pell died at home on January 1, 2009, at the age of 90. His funeral was held at Trinity Church (Newport, Rhode Island). In addition to members of his family, Pell was eulogized by former President Bill Clinton, Senators Edward Kennedy and Jack Reed, and then-Vice President-elect Joe Biden. He was buried at St. Columba's (Episcopal) Chapel (Berkeley Memorial Chapel) in Middletown, Rhode Island, near the graves of his son Herbert and his daughter Julia, who had predeceased him.

In an obituary, The New York Times called Pell "the most formidable politician in Rhode Island history."

== Authorship, recognition, organizations ==
=== Published works ===
Senator Pell authored three books, Megalopolis Unbound: The Supercity and the Transportation of Tomorrow (1966), A Challenge of the Seven Seas (1966), (co-author), and "Power and Policy: America's Role in World Affairs" (1972).

=== Awards and honors ===
Senator Pell received more than 50 honorary college degrees, including recognition from Johnson & Wales University, the University of Vermont and the University of Massachusetts.

In 1983 Pell was awarded American Library Association Honorary Membership.

In 1987 Pell was among those selected for the United Nations Environment Programme's Global 500 Roll of Honour, during the first year that award was established.

In 1988, Pell received the Foreign Language Advocacy Award from the Northeast Conference on the Teaching of Foreign Languages in recognition of his work in establishing the NEA, the NEH, and the Pell Grant Program.

On October 14, 1994, President Bill Clinton presented Pell with the Presidential Citizens Medal.

Rhode Island's Newport Bridge was renamed the Claiborne Pell Bridge and the Pell Center of International Relations and Public Policy was established at Salve Regina University. In addition, Newport's Claiborne Pell Elementary School, which opened in 2013, was named in his honor.

Pell was a Chevalier of the French Legion of Honor. He also received the Knight Grand Cross of the Order of the Crown of Italy.

His awards for service in the Coast Guard during the Second World War included the American Defense Service Medal, American Campaign Medal, European-African-Middle Eastern Campaign Medal and the World War Two Victory Medal.

=== Memberships ===
In 1956, Pell was elected a member of the Rhode Island Society of the Cincinnati by right of his descent from Surgeon's Mate John Wilkins, Jr. He was also an honorary life member of the Rhode Island Society of Colonial Wars as well as a member of Spouting Rock Beach Association (Bailey's Beach) and the Newport Reading Room.

== Honors ==
- Presidential Citizens Medal (1994)
- American Defense Service Medal
- American Campaign Medal
- European-African-Middle Eastern Campaign Medal
- World War II Victory Medal
- Armed Forces Reserve Medal
- Grand Cross of the Order of Christ, Portugal (May 31, 1979)
- Grand Cross of the Order of Merit, Portugal (October 7, 1994)
- Knight Grand Cross, Order of the Crown of Italy
- Chevalier, Legion of Honor (France)

Party political offices
Preceded by Theodore Green	Democratic nominee for U.S. Senator from Rhode Island (Class 2); 1960, 1966, 1972, 1978, 1984, 1990	Succeeded by Jack Reed
Preceded by Les AuCoin, Joe Biden, Bill Bradley, Robert Byrd, Tom Daschle, Bill Hefner, Barbara B. Kennelly, George Miller, Tip O'Neill, Paul Tsongas, Tim Wirth	Response to the State of the Union address 1984; Served alongside: Max Baucus, Joe Biden, David Boren, Barbara Boxer, Robert Byrd, Dante Fascell, Bill Gray, Tom Harkin, Dee Huddleston, Carl Levin, Tip O'Neill	Succeeded by Bill Clinton; Bob Graham; Tip O'Neill
U.S. Senate
Preceded by Theodore Green	U.S. Senator (Class 2) from Rhode Island; 1961–1997; Served alongside: John O. Pastore, John Chafee	Succeeded by Jack Reed
Preceded by Howard Cannon	Chair of the Senate Rules Committee; 1978–1981	Succeeded by Charles Mathias
Preceded by Richard Lugar	Chair of the Senate Foreign Relations Committee; 1987–1995	Succeeded by Jesse Helms
