= 1960 United States Senate election in Rhode Island =

- November 8, 1960
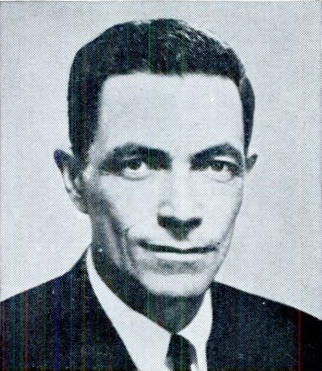

Nominee	Claiborne Pell	Raoul Archambault Jr.
Party	Democratic	Republican
Popular vote	275,575	124,408
Percentage	68.90%	31.10%
- Pell: 50–60% 60–70% 70–80% 80–90% Archambault: 50–60% 60–70%
U.S. senator before election
Theodore F. Green
Democratic
Elected U.S. Senator
Claiborne Pell
Democratic

The 1960 United States Senate election in Rhode Island took place on November 8, 1960. Incumbent Democratic U.S. Senator Theodore F. Green did not seek re-election. Democrat Claiborne Pell won the seat, defeating Republican Raoul Archambault Jr.

== Primary elections ==
The Republican primary was held on September 19, 1960, and the Democratic primary was held on September 28, 1960.

=== Democratic primary ===
==== Candidates ====
- Claiborne Pell, vice president of the International Rescue Committee and the North American Newspaper Alliance
- Dennis J. Roberts, former Governor of Rhode Island
- J. Howard McGrath, former U.S. Senator and U.S. Attorney General

==== Results ====
Democratic primary results
Party	Candidate	Votes	%
Democratic	Claiborne Pell	83,184	61.33%
Democratic	Dennis J. Roberts	44,924	33.12%
Democratic	J. Howard McGrath	7,535	5.56%
Total votes		135,643	100.00%

=== Republican primary ===
==== Candidates ====
- Raoul Archambault Jr., Republican nominee for Governor in 1952

==== Results ====
Republican primary results
Party	Candidate	Votes	%
Republican	Raoul Archambault Jr.		unopposed

== General election ==
=== Results ===
General election results
Party	Candidate	Votes	%
Democratic	Claiborne Pell	275,575	68.90
Republican	Raoul Archambault Jr.	124,408	31.10
Majority		151,167	37.80
Turnout		399,983	
Democratic hold			

== Bibliography ==
- Congressional Elections, 1946-1996. Washington, D.C.: Congressional Quarterly Inc. 1998. ISBN 1-56802-248-4.
- Official Count of the Ballots Cast for Presidential Electors, United States Senator, Representatives in Congress, General Officers, and Senators and Representatives in the General Assembly etc (PDF). Board of Elections of Rhode Island. 1960.
