= 1990 United States Senate election in Maine =

- November 6, 1990
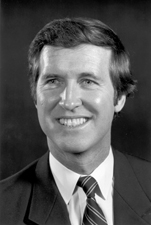

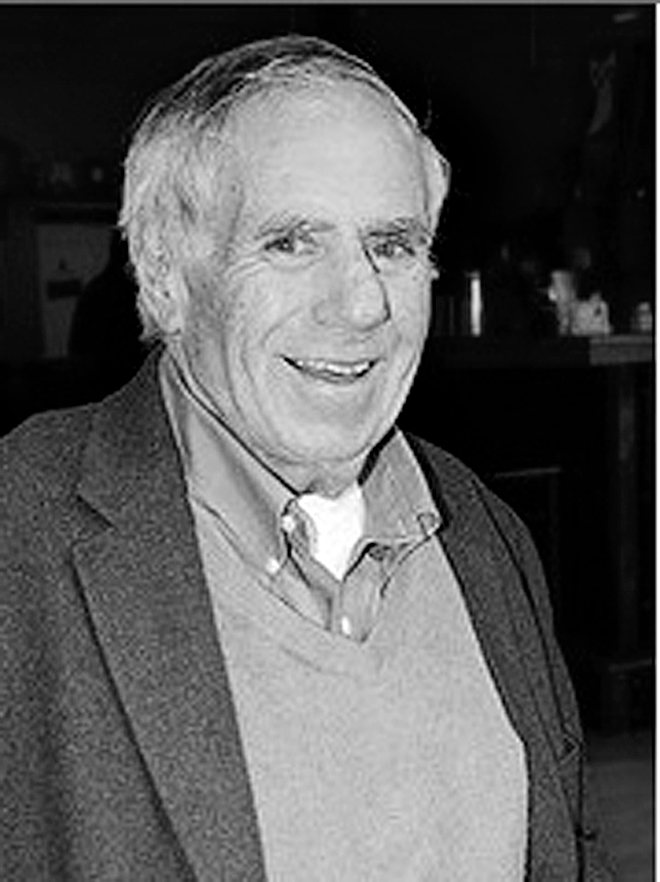
Nominee	William Cohen	Neil Rolde
Party	Republican	Democratic
Popular vote	319,167	201,053
Percentage	61.35%	38.65%
- Cohen: 50–60% 60–70% 70–80% 80–90% >90% Rolde: 50–60% 60–70% 70–80% Tie: 50%
U.S. senator before election
William Cohen
Republican
Elected U.S. Senator
William Cohen
Republican

The 1990 United States Senate election in Maine was held on November 6, 1990. Incumbent Republican U.S. Senator William Cohen won re-election to a third term, defeating Democratic state representative Neil Rolde. Both Cohen and Rolde were unopposed in their respective primaries.

== Major candidates ==
=== Democratic ===
- Neil Rolde, State Representative

=== Republican ===
- William Cohen, incumbent U.S. Senator

== Results ==
General election results
Party	Candidate	Votes	%
Republican	William Cohen (incumbent)	319,167	61.35%
Democratic	Neil Rolde	201,053	38.65%
Total votes		520,220	100.00%
Republican hold			

== See also ==
- 1990 United States Senate elections
