= Neil Rolde =

American politician and historian

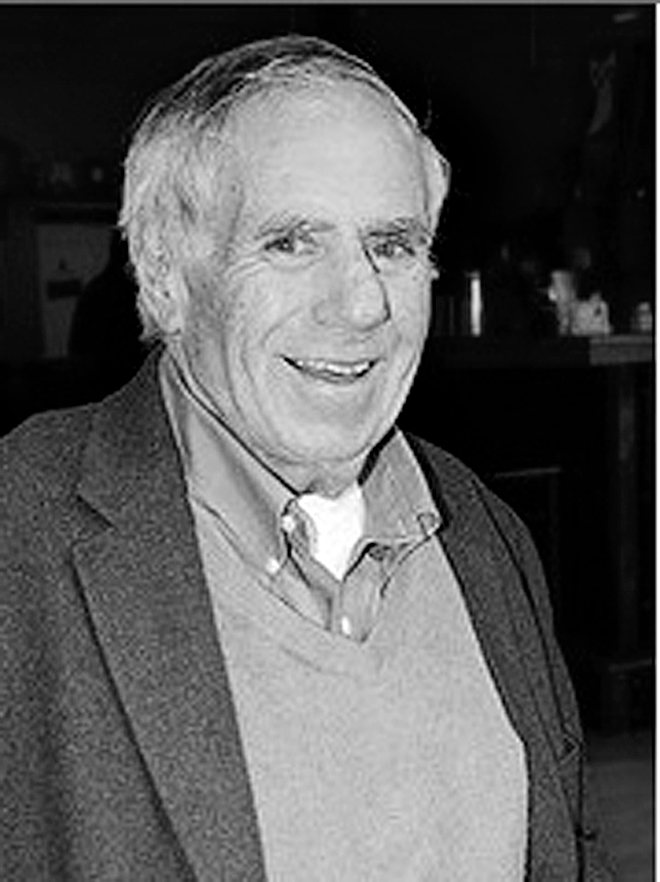

Member of the Maine House of Representatives
- In office 1974–1990

Personal details
- Born: July 25, 1931 Brookline, Massachusetts, U.S.
- Died: May 15, 2017 (aged 85) York, Maine, U.S.
- Party: Democratic
- Education: Yale University (BA); Columbia University (MA)
- Profession: Author, Historian
- Website: Website (Archived)

Neil Rolde (July 25, 1931 – May 15, 2017) was an American historian, author, philanthropist, and politician. Rolde grew up in Brookline, Massachusetts, and attended Phillips Academy in Andover. He earned a BA in English Literature at Yale University and a masters in journalism at Columbia University. He worked as a film scriptwriter before moving to Maine with his wife, Carlotta Florsheim, to raise their family.

== Political career ==
Rolde's many years of public service include being an assistant to Governor Kenneth M. Curtis of Maine for six years (including campaign manager in 1967) and sixteen years from 1974-1990 as elected representative in the Maine Legislature. He represented the district of York and became majority leader of the Maine House during the 107th Legislature from 1975-77.

In 1976, Rolde ran in a seven-candidate primary for the 1976 Democratic nomination for the United States House of Representatives, where he gained 18 percent of the vote and finished third. In 1990, Rolde won the Democratic Party's nomination but lost to the incumbent Republican Senator Bill Cohen.

Rolde served on a number of state boards and commissions, including the Maine Health Care Reform Commission, the Maine Historic Preservation, and the Maine Arts and Humanities Commission; and private, nonprofit boards, where he served as chairman, Maine Public Broadcasting Corporation, vice-chair, University of New England Board of Trustees, chairman, Board of Bigelow Laboratory for Ocean Sciences, chairman, Seacoast Shipyard Association Executive Board, and trustee, the Maine Health Care Access Foundation.

He was very involved in his York community, remained politically active, and continued to serve as chairman of the board of the Save our Shipyard nonprofit that twice successfully fought the potential cuts to the Portsmouth Naval Shipyard proposed by the BRAC federal commission.

== Writing career ==
Most of Neil Rolde's books are about Maine history and its people. The history and challenges of Maine's Native Americans has been a reoccurring theme since Rolde's childhood, and he helped the tribes while in the Curtis administration. His experiences led him to write one of Maine's definitive historical books: Unsettled Past, Unsettled Future: The Story of Maine Indians.

The author received awards for his books from the Maine Historical Society, the Maine Writers and Publishers Alliance, and the Maine Humanities Council.

== Death ==
Rolde died of natural causes at his home in York, Maine, on May 15, 2017, at the age of 85.

== Publications ==
- More Than a Teardrop in the Ocean; Volume 1, The Tempestuous Story of the War Refugee Board
- More Than a Teardrop in the Ocean; Volume 2, More of the Tempestuous Story of the War Refugee Board
- Real Political Tales: Short Stories by a Veteran Politician
- Breckinridge Long: American Eichmann??? An Enquiry into the Character of the Man Who Denied Visas to the Jews
- York Is Living History
- Maine: A Narrative History, Harpswell Press, 1990
- O. Murray Carr: A Novel
- Maine in the World: Stories of Some of Those From Here Who Went Away
- Continental Liar From the State of Maine: James G. Blaine
- Maine: Downeast and Different, an Illustrated History
- Unsettled Past, Unsettled Future: The Story of Maine Indians
- The Interrupted Forest: A History of Maine’s Wildlands
- The Baxters of Maine: Downeast Visionaries
- Your Money or Your Health: America’s cruel, Bureaucratic, and Horrendously Expensive Health Care System
- So You Think You Know Maine
- Rio Grande Do Norte: The Story of Maine’s Partner State in Brazil
- Sir William Pepperrell of Colonial New England, Harpswell Press, 1982

As coauthor and contributor:

- To Katahdin: The 1876 Adventures of Four Young Men and a Boat
- Greatest Mountain: Katahdin’s Wilderness

Party political offices
Preceded by Libby Mitchell	Democratic nominee for U.S. Senator from Maine (Class 2); 1990	Succeeded by Joseph E. Brennan
