= 1990 United States Senate elections =

- November 6, 1990
- Class 2

35 (Note: 33 Class 2 seats, as well as 2 seats each in Class 1 and Class 3 in special election) of the 100 seats in the United States Senate 51 seats needed for a majority
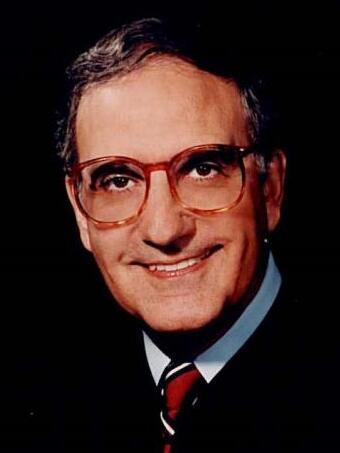

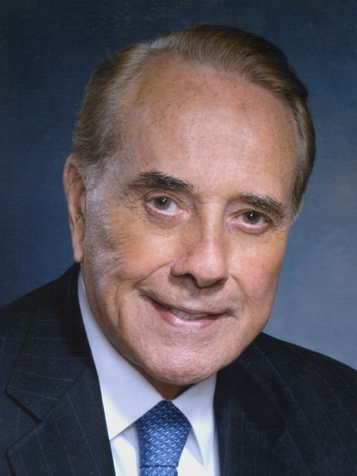
	Majority party	Minority party
Leader	George Mitchell	Bob Dole
Party	Democratic	Republican
Leader since	January 3, 1989	January 3, 1985
Leader's seat	Maine	Kansas
Seats before	55	45
Seats after	56	44
Seat change	▲1	▼1
Popular vote	17,907,544 (Note: As J. Bennett Johnston won Louisiana's jungle primary outright with a majority on October 6, he was listed unopposed for the general election on November 6. State law does not require tabulation of unopposed votes, thus the nationwide vote totals exclude Louisiana.)	16,494,624
Percentage	51.1%	47.1%
Seats up	17	18
Races won	18	17
- Results of the elections: Democratic gain Democratic hold Republican hold No election
Majority Leader before election
George Mitchell
Democratic
Elected Majority Leader
George Mitchell
Democratic

The 1990 United States Senate elections were held on November 6, 1990, with the 33 seats of Class 2 contested in regular elections. Special elections were also held to fill vacancies. The Democratic Party increased its majority with a net gain of one seat from the Republican Party. The election cycle took place in the middle of President George H. W. Bush's term, and as with most other midterm elections, the party not holding the presidency gained seats in Congress. This was the first time since 1980 where any party successfully defended all their own seats, and the first time where Democrats did so since 1958. It was also the last time where the Democrats (or any party) made net gains in three or more election cycles in a row, having last experienced net losses in the Senate in 1980.

These elections, along with 2022, featured the smallest seat change in history since the passage of the Seventeenth Amendment in 1913, with only one seat changing parties. This election featured Democrat Paul Wellstone defeating incumbent Republican Rudy Boschwitz in Minnesota. To date, this is the last cycle in which Democratic candidates won U.S. Senate elections in Oklahoma and Tennessee.

== Background ==
The election was held as part of the midterm election cycle of Republican President George H. W. Bush's term. Historically, the President's party struggles during the midterms.

== Results summary ==
↓
56	44
Democratic	Republican

Parties						Total
Parties	Democratic	Republican	Libertarian	Independent	Other	Total
Last elections (1988) Before these elections	55	45	0	0	0	100
Not up	38	27	—	—	—	65
Up	17	18	—	—	—	35
Class 2 (1984→1990)	16	17	—	—	—	33
Special: Class 1	1	—	—	—	—	1
Special: Class 3	—	1	—	—	—	1
Incumbent retired	0	3	—	—	—	3
Held by same party	0	3	—	—	—	3
Replaced by other party	0	0	—	—	—	0
Result	0	3	—	—	—	3
Incumbent ran	17	15	—	—	—	32
Won election	17	14	—	—	—	31
Lost re-election	▼1 Republican replaced by ▲1 Democrat		—	—	—	1
Lost renomination, but held by same party	0	0	—	—	—	0
Result	18	14	—	—	—	32
Total elected	18	17	—	—	—	35
Net gain/loss	▲1	▼1	Steady	Steady	Steady	1
Nationwide vote	17,907,544	16,494,624	142,003	222,534	260,665	35,027,370
Share	51.12%	47.09%	0.41%	0.64%	0.74%	100%
Result	56	44	0	0	0	100

Source: Clerk of the United States House of Representatives

== Gains, losses, and holds ==
=== Retirements ===
Map of retirements: Republican incumbent Democratic incumbent Republican incumbent retired

Three Republicans retired instead of seeking re-election.

State	Senator	Age at end of term	Assumed office	Replaced by
Colorado	William L. Armstrong	53	1979	Hank Brown
Idaho	James A. McClure	66	1973	Larry Craig
New Hampshire	Gordon J. Humphrey	50	1979	Bob Smith

=== Defeats ===
Despite several candidates being in danger of losing their reelection bid, Minnesota Republican Senator Rudy Boschwitz was the only incumbent who ran for re-election to be defeated.

State	Senator	Assumed office	Replaced by	Ref
Minnesota	Rudy Boschwitz	1978	Paul Wellstone	

== Change in composition ==
D_{#}	Democratic
R_{#}	Republican

=== Before the elections ===
D_{1}	D_{2}	D_{3}	D_{4}	D_{5}	D_{6}	D_{7}	D_{8}	D_{9}	D_{10}
D_{20}	D_{19}	D_{18}	D_{17}	D_{16}	D_{15}	D_{14}	D_{13}	D_{12}	D_{11}
D_{21}	D_{22}	D_{23}	D_{24}	D_{25}	D_{26}	D_{27}	D_{28}	D_{29}	D_{30}
D_{40} Ark. Ran	D_{39} Ala. Ran	D_{38}	D_{37}	D_{36}	D_{35}	D_{34}	D_{33}	D_{32}	D_{31}
D_{41} Del. Ran	D_{42} Ga. Ran	D_{43} Hawaii (sp); Ran	D_{44} Ill. Ran	D_{45} Iowa; Ran	D_{46} La. Ran	D_{47} Mass. Ran	D_{48} Mich. Ran	D_{49} Mont. Ran	D_{50} Neb. Ran
Majority →									D_{51} N.J. Ran
R_{41} S.C. Ran	R_{42} S.D. Ran	R_{43} Texas; Ran	R_{44} Va. Ran	R_{45} Wyo. Ran	D_{55} W.Va. Ran	D_{54} Tenn. Ran	D_{53} R.I. Ran	D_{52} Okla. Ran	D_{51} N.J. Ran
R_{40} Ore. Ran	R_{39} N.C. Ran	R_{38} N.M. Ran	R_{37} N.H. Retired	R_{36} Miss. Ran	R_{35} Minn. Ran	R_{34} Me. Ran	R_{33} Ky. Ran	R_{32} Kan. Ran	R_{31} Ind. (sp); Ran
R_{21}	R_{22}	R_{23}	R_{24}	R_{25}	R_{26}	R_{27}	R_{28} Alaska; Ran	R_{29} Colo. Retired	R_{30} Idaho; Retired
R_{20}	R_{19}	R_{18}	R_{17}	R_{16}	R_{15}	R_{14}	R_{13}	R_{12}	R_{11}
R_{1}	R_{2}	R_{3}	R_{4}	R_{5}	R_{6}	R_{7}	R_{8}	R_{9}	R_{10}

=== Result of the elections ===
D_{1}	D_{2}	D_{3}	D_{4}	D_{5}	D_{6}	D_{7}	D_{8}	D_{9}	D_{10}
D_{20}	D_{19}	D_{18}	D_{17}	D_{16}	D_{15}	D_{14}	D_{13}	D_{12}	D_{11}
D_{21}	D_{22}	D_{23}	D_{24}	D_{25}	D_{26}	D_{27}	D_{28}	D_{29}	D_{30}
D_{40} Ark. Re-elected	D_{39} Ala. Re-elected	D_{38}	D_{37}	D_{36}	D_{35}	D_{34}	D_{33}	D_{32}	D_{31}
D_{41} Del. Re-elected	D_{42} Ga. Re-elected	D_{43} Hawaii (sp); Elected (Note: Appointee elected)	D_{44} Ill. Re-elected	D_{45} Iowa; Re-elected	D_{46} La. Re-elected	D_{47} Mass. Re-elected	D_{48} Mich. Re-elected	D_{49} Mont. Re-elected	D_{50} Neb. Re-elected
Majority →									D_{51} N.J. Re-elected
R_{41} S.D. Re-elected	R_{42} Texas; Re-elected	R_{43} Va. Re-elected	R_{44} Wyo. Re-elected	D_{56} Minn. Gain	D_{55} W.Va. Re-elected	D_{54} Tenn. Re-elected	D_{53} R.I. Re-elected	D_{52} Okla. Re-elected	D_{51} N.J. Re-elected
R_{40} S.C. Re-elected	R_{39} Ore. Re-elected	R_{38} N.C. Re-elected	R_{37} N.M. Re-elected	R_{36} N.H. Hold	R_{35} Miss. Re-elected	R_{34} Me. Re-elected	R_{33} Ky. Re-elected	R_{32} Kan. Re-elected	R_{31} Ind. (sp); Elected
R_{21}	R_{22}	R_{23}	R_{24}	R_{25}	R_{26}	R_{27}	R_{28} Alaska; Re-elected	R_{29} Colo. Hold	R_{30} Idaho; Hold
R_{20}	R_{19}	R_{18}	R_{17}	R_{16}	R_{15}	R_{14}	R_{13}	R_{12}	R_{11}
R_{1}	R_{2}	R_{3}	R_{4}	R_{5}	R_{6}	R_{7}	R_{8}	R_{9}	R_{10}

== Complete list of races ==
=== Special elections ===
In these special elections, the winners were elected in 1990.

Elections are sorted by date, then state and class.

State	Incumbent			Result	Candidates
State	Senator	Party	Electoral history	Result	Candidates
Hawaii (Class 1)	Daniel Akaka	Democratic	1990 (appointed)	Interim appointee elected November 6, 1990.	▌ ✓ Daniel Akaka (Democratic) 54.0%; ▌Pat Saiki (Republican) 44.6%; ▌Ken Schoolland (Libertarian) 1.4%
Indiana (Class 3)	Dan Coats	Republican	1989 (appointed)	Interim appointee elected November 6, 1990.	▌ ✓ Dan Coats (Republican) 53.7%; ▌Baron Hill (Democratic) 46.3%

=== Elections leading to the next Congress ===
In these general elections, the winners were elected for the term beginning January 3, 1991; ordered by state.

All of the elections involved the Class 2 seats.

State	Incumbent			Result	Candidates
State	Senator	Party	Electoral history	Result	Candidates
Alabama	Howell Heflin	Democratic	1978; 1984	Incumbent re-elected.	▌ ✓ Howell Heflin (Democratic) 60.7%; ▌William J. Cabaniss (Republican) 39.3%
Alaska	Ted Stevens	Republican	1968 (appointed); 1970; 1972; 1978; 1984	Incumbent re-elected.	▌ ✓ Ted Stevens (Republican) 67.2%; ▌Michael Beasley (Democratic) 32.8%
Arkansas	David Pryor	Democratic	1978; 1984	Incumbent re-elected.	▌ ✓ David Pryor (Democratic); Unopposed
Colorado	William L. Armstrong	Republican	1978; 1984	Incumbent retired. Republican hold.	▌ ✓ Hank Brown (Republican) 55.7%; ▌Josie Heath (Democratic) 41.6%; Others: ▌John Heckman (Concerns of People) 1.5%; ▌Earl Dodge (Prohibition) 1.2%
Delaware	Joe Biden	Democratic	1972; 1978; 1984	Incumbent re-elected.	▌ ✓ Joe Biden (Democratic) 62.7%; ▌M. Jane Brady (Republican) 35.8%; ▌Lee Rosenbaum (Libertarian) 1.5%
Georgia	Sam Nunn	Democratic	1972 (special); 1972; 1978; 1984	Incumbent re-elected.	▌ ✓ Sam Nunn (Democratic); Unopposed
Idaho	James A. McClure	Republican	1972; 1978; 1984	Incumbent retired. Republican hold.	▌ ✓ Larry Craig (Republican) 61.3%; ▌Ron J. Twilegar (Democratic) 38.7%
Illinois	Paul Simon	Democratic	1984	Incumbent re-elected.	▌ ✓ Paul Simon (Democratic) 64.9%; ▌Lynn M. Martin (Republican) 35.1%
Iowa	Tom Harkin	Democratic	1984	Incumbent re-elected.	▌ ✓ Tom Harkin (Democratic) 54.5%; ▌Tom Tauke (Republican) 45.4%
Kansas	Nancy Kassebaum	Republican	1978; 1978 (appointed); 1984	Incumbent re-elected.	▌ ✓ Nancy Kassebaum (Republican) 73.6%; ▌Dick Williams (Democratic) 26.4%
Kentucky	Mitch McConnell	Republican	1984	Incumbent re-elected.	▌ ✓ Mitch McConnell (Republican) 52.2%; ▌Harvey I. Sloane (Democratic) 47.8%
Louisiana	J. Bennett Johnston	Democratic	1972 (appointed); 1972; 1978; 1984	Incumbent re-elected.	▌ ✓ J. Bennett Johnston (Democratic) 54.0%; ▌David Duke (Republican) 43.5%
Maine	William Cohen	Republican	1978; 1984	Incumbent re-elected.	▌ ✓ William Cohen (Republican) 61.4%; ▌Neil Rolde (Democratic) 38.6%
Massachusetts	John Kerry	Democratic	1984	Incumbent re-elected.	▌ ✓ John Kerry (Democratic) 56.9%; ▌Jim Rappaport (Republican) 43.1%
Michigan	Carl Levin	Democratic	1978; 1984	Incumbent re-elected.	▌ ✓ Carl Levin (Democratic) 57.5%; ▌Bill Schuette (Republican) 41.2%; ▌Susan Farquhar (Workers World) 1.3%
Minnesota	Rudy Boschwitz	Republican	1978; 1978 (appointed); 1984	Incumbent lost re-election. DFL gain.	▌ ✓ Paul Wellstone (DFL) 50.4%; ▌Rudy Boschwitz (Republican) 47.8%; ▌Russell Bentley (Grassroots) 1.6%
Mississippi	Thad Cochran	Republican	1978; 1978 (appointed); 1984	Incumbent re-elected.	▌ ✓ Thad Cochran (Republican); Unopposed
Montana	Max Baucus	Democratic	1978; 1978 (appointed); 1984	Incumbent re-elected.	▌ ✓ Max Baucus (Democratic) 68.1%; ▌Allen Kolstad (Republican) 29.4%; ▌Westley Deitchler (Libertarian) 2.5%
Nebraska	J. James Exon	Democratic	1978; 1984	Incumbent re-elected.	▌ ✓ J. James Exon (Democratic) 59.1%; ▌Hal Daub (Republican) 40.9%
New Hampshire	Gordon J. Humphrey	Republican	1978; 1984	Incumbent retired. Republican hold. Incumbent resigned December 4, 1990 to take a seat in the New Hampshire Senate. Winner appointed December 7, 1990.	▌ ✓ Bob Smith (Republican) 65.1%; ▌John A. Durkin (Democratic) 31.3%; ▌John Elsnau (Libertarian) 3.3%
New Jersey	Bill Bradley	Democratic	1978; 1984	Incumbent re-elected.	▌ ✓ Bill Bradley (Democratic) 50.4%; ▌Christine Todd Whitman (Republican) 47.4%; Others: ▌John L. Kucek (Populist) 1.0%; ▌Louis M. Stefanelli (Libertarian) 0.7%; ▌Don Mackle (Socialist Workers) 0.4%
New Mexico	Pete Domenici	Republican	1972; 1978; 1984	Incumbent re-elected.	▌ ✓ Pete Domenici (Republican) 72.9%; ▌Tom Benavidez (Democratic) 27.1%
North Carolina	Jesse Helms	Republican	1972; 1978; 1984	Incumbent re-elected.	▌ ✓ Jesse Helms (Republican) 52.6%; ▌Harvey Gantt (Democratic) 47.4%
Oklahoma	David Boren	Democratic	1978; 1984	Incumbent re-elected.	▌ ✓ David Boren (Democratic) 83.2%; ▌Stephen Jones (Republican) 17.8%
Oregon	Mark Hatfield	Republican	1966; 1972; 1978; 1984	Incumbent re-elected.	▌ ✓ Mark Hatfield (Republican) 53.9%; ▌Harry Lonsdale (Democratic) 46.1%
Rhode Island	Claiborne Pell	Democratic	1960; 1966; 1972; 1978; 1984	Incumbent re-elected.	▌ ✓ Claiborne Pell (Democratic) 61.8%; ▌Claudine Schneider (Republican) 38.2%
South Carolina	Strom Thurmond	Republican	1954 (write-in) (Note: Senator Strom Thurmond was originally elected as a Democrat in 1954, but as a write-in candidate, a special election in 1956 and 1960 before switching to a Republican in 1964. Thurmond won re-election as a Republican in 1966, 1972, 1978 and 1984.); 1954 (appointed); 1956 (resigned); 1956 (special); 1960; 1966; 1972; 1978; 1984	Incumbent re-elected.	▌ ✓ Strom Thurmond (Republican) 64.2%; ▌Bob Cunningham (Democratic) 32.5%; Others: ▌William H. Griffin (Libertarian) 1.8%; ▌Marion C. Metts (American) 1.4%
South Dakota	Larry Pressler	Republican	1978; 1984	Incumbent re-elected.	▌ ✓ Larry Pressler (Republican) 52.4%; ▌Ted Muenster (Democratic) 45.1%; ▌Dean L. Sinclair (Independent) 2.5%
Tennessee	Al Gore	Democratic	1984	Incumbent re-elected.	▌ ✓ Al Gore (Democratic) 67.7%; ▌William R. Hawkins (Republican) 29.8%; Others: ▌Bill Jacox (Independent) 1.4%; ▌Charles Gordon Vick (Independent) 1.0%
Texas	Phil Gramm	Republican	1984	Incumbent re-elected.	▌ ✓ Phil Gramm (Republican) 60.2%; ▌Hugh Parmer (Democratic) 37.4%; ▌Gary Johnson (Libertarian) 2.3%
Virginia	John Warner	Republican	1978; 1979 (appointed); 1984	Incumbent re-elected.	▌ ✓ John Warner (Republican) 80.9%; ▌Nancy B. Spannaus (Independent) 18.2%
West Virginia	Jay Rockefeller	Democratic	1984	Incumbent re-elected.	▌ ✓ Jay Rockefeller (Democratic) 68.5%; ▌John Yoder (Republican) 31.5%
Wyoming	Alan Simpson	Republican	1978; 1979 (appointed); 1984	Incumbent re-elected.	▌ ✓ Alan Simpson (Republican) 66.4%; ▌Kathy Helling (Democratic) 33.6%

== Closest races ==
In eight races the margin of victory was under 10%.

State	Party of winner	Margin
Minnesota	Democratic (flip)	2.63%
New Jersey	Democratic	3.04%
Kentucky	Republican	4.38%
North Carolina	Republican	5.19%
South Dakota	Republican	7.32%
Oregon	Republican	7.49%
Iowa	Democratic	9.05%
Hawaii (special)	Democratic	9.37%

Michigan was the tipping point state with a margin of 16.3%.

== Alabama ==
Alabama election
- November 6, 1990
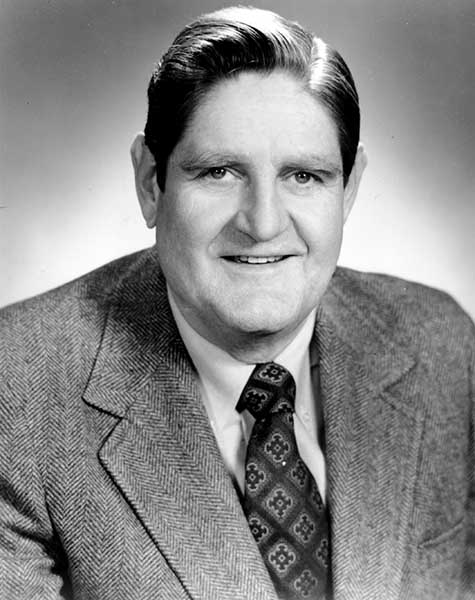

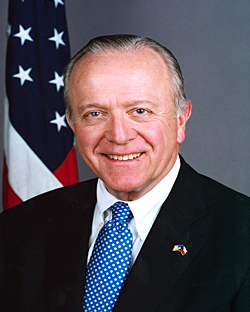
Nominee	Howell Heflin	Bill Cabaniss
Party	Democratic	Republican
Popular vote	717,814	467,190
Percentage	60.6%	39.4%
- County results Heflin: 50–60% 60–70% 70–80% 80–90% Cabaniss: 50–60%
U.S. senator before election
Howell Heflin
Democratic
Elected U.S. Senator
Howell Heflin
Democratic

Incumbent Democrat Howell Heflin won re-election to a third term over Republican Bill Cabaniss, State Senator and former State Representative. This was the last time the Democrats have won the Class 2 Senate Seat from Alabama until Doug Jones won the seat in 2017.

General election results
Party	Candidate	Votes	%	±%
Democratic	Howell Heflin (Incumbent)	717,814	60.67%	−2.00%
Republican	William J. Cabaniss	467,190	39.43%	+3.00%
Total votes		1,184,954	100.00%	
Majority		250,624	21.24%	
Democratic hold		Swing		

== Alaska ==
Alaska election
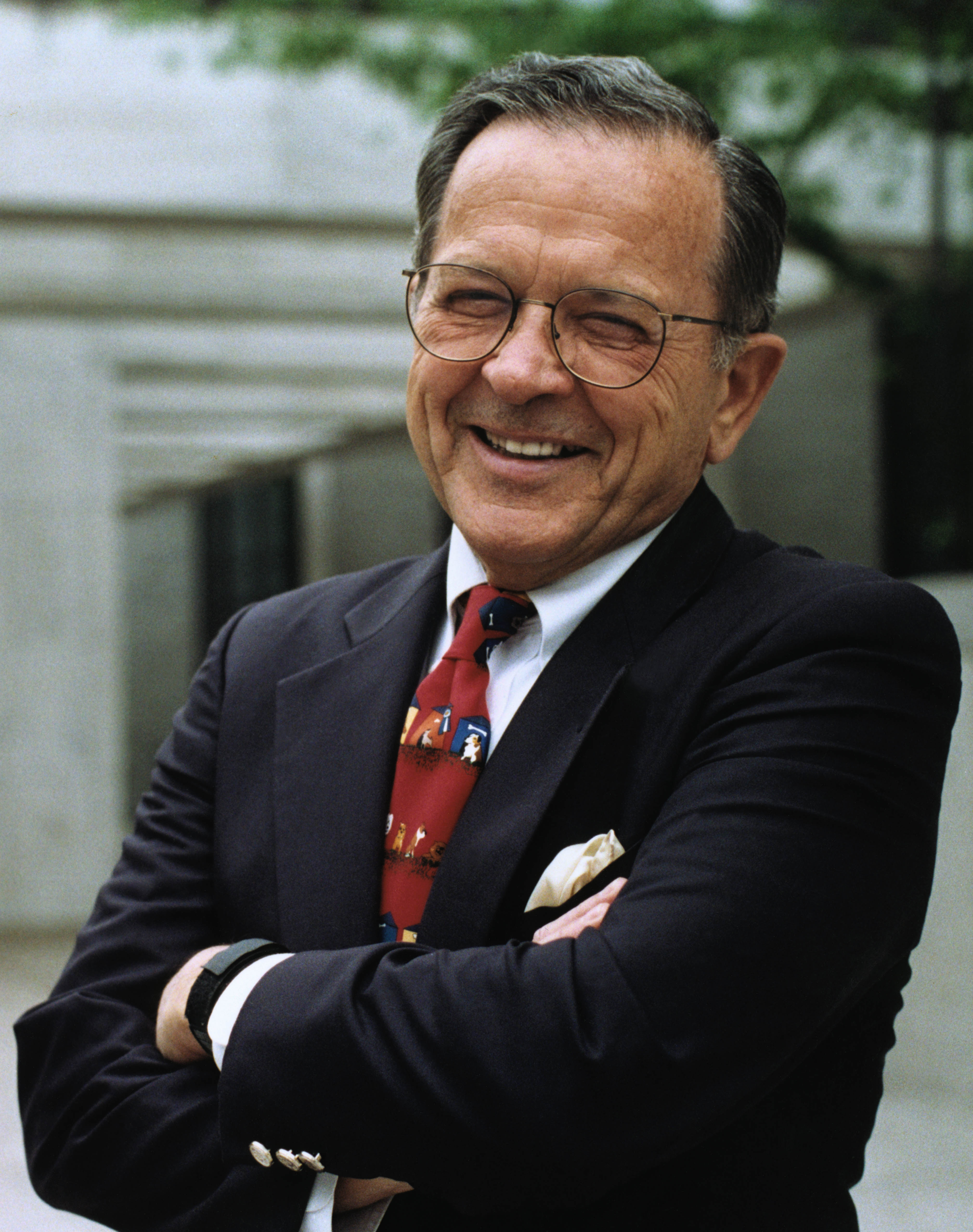

Nominee	Ted Stevens	Michael Beasley
Party	Republican	Democratic
Popular vote	125,806	61,152
Percentage	66.23%	32.19%
- Results by state house district Stevens: 50–60% 60–70% 70–80%
U.S. senator before election
Ted Stevens
Republican
Elected U.S. Senator
Ted Stevens
Republican

Incumbent Republican United States Senator Ted Stevens sought re-election to a fifth term in the United States Senate, which he won easily, besting his opponents in a landslide.

Open primary results
Party	Candidate	Votes	%
Republican	Ted Stevens (Incumbent)	81,968	59.19%
Republican	John Havelock	34,824	25.15%
Democratic	Michael Beasley	12,371	8.93%
Democratic	Tom Taggart	9,329	6.74%
Total votes		138,492	100.00%

1990 United States Senate election in Alaska
Party	Candidate	Votes	%	±%
Republican	Ted Stevens (Incumbent)	125,806	66.23%	−4.94%
Democratic	Michael Beasley	61,152	32.19%	+3.71%
Write-ins		2,999	1.58%	
Majority		64,654	34.04%	−8.65%
Turnout		189,957		
Republican hold		Swing		

== Arkansas ==
Arkansas election
Nominee	David Pryor
Party	Democratic
Popular vote	493,910
Percentage	99.83%
- County results Pryor: 100% No data/No votes
re-election before election
David Pryor
Democratic
Elected re-election
David Pryor
Democratic

Incumbent Democrat David Pryor won re-election uncontested.

1990 Arkansas United States Senate election
Party	Candidate	Votes	%
Democratic	David Pryor (Incumbent)	493,910	99.83%
Independent	Betty White (write-in)	825	0.17%
Majority		493,085	99.67%
Turnout		494,735	
Democratic hold			

== Colorado ==
Colorado election
- November 6, 1990
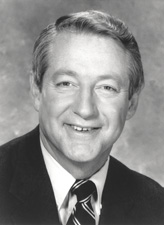

Nominee	Hank Brown	Josie Heath
Party	Republican	Democratic
Popular vote	569,048	425,746
Percentage	55.7%	41.7%
- County results Brown: 50–60% 60–70% 70–80% 80–90% Heath: 40–50% 50–60% 60–70%
U.S. senator before election
William L. Armstrong
Republican
Elected U.S. Senator
Hank Brown
Republican

Incumbent Republican senator William L. Armstrong did not seek re-election to another term. Republican congressman Hank Brown won the open seat, defeating Democratic nominee Josie Heath, former Boulder County Commissioner

General election results
Party	Candidate	Votes	%
Republican	Hank Brown	569,048	55.68%
Democratic	Josie Heath	425,746	41.66%
Concerns of People	John Heckman	15,432	1.51%
Colorado Prohibition	Earl F. Dodge	11,801	1.15%
Write-In	Others	32	0.00%
Majority		143,302	14.02%
Turnout		1,022,059	
Republican hold			

== Delaware ==
Delaware election
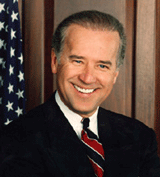

Nominee	Joe Biden	M. Jane Brady
Party	Democratic	Republican
Popular vote	112,918	64,554
Percentage	62.68%	35.83%
- County results Biden: 50–60% 60–70%
U.S. senator before election
Joe Biden
Democratic
Elected U.S. Senator
Joe Biden
Democratic

Incumbent Democratic Joe Biden won re-election to a fourth term, defeating Republican challenger Deputy Attorney General of Delaware M. Jane Brady. Brady decided to run because she felt that Biden's liberal voting record did not reflect the political positions of Delawareans. The election had a turnout rate of under 40% of registered voters. Biden won in a landslide with over 60% of the vote improving on his 1984 margin, winning all three counties and all 41 state house districts.

General election results
Party	Candidate	Votes	%	±%
Democratic	Joe Biden (Incumbent)	112,918	62.68%	+2.57%
Republican	M. Jane Brady	64,554	35.83%	−4.06%
Libertarian	Lee Rosenbaum	2,680	1.49%	
Write-ins		5	0.00%	
Majority		48,364	26.85%	+6.62%
Turnout		180,157		
Democratic hold		Swing		

== Georgia ==
Georgia election
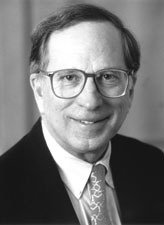
Nominee	Sam Nunn
Party	Democratic
Popular vote	1,033,439
Percentage	100.0%
- County results Nunn: 100%
U.S. senator before election
Sam Nunn
Democratic
Elected U.S. Senator
Sam Nunn
Democratic

Incumbent Democrat Sam Nunn won re-election to a fourth term uncontested.

General election results, 1990
Party	Candidate	Votes	%	±%
Democratic	Sam Nunn (Incumbent)	1,033,439	100.00%	+20.06%
Majority		1,033,439	100.00%	+40.12%
Turnout		1,033,439		
Democratic hold		Swing		

== Hawaii (special) ==
Hawaii special election
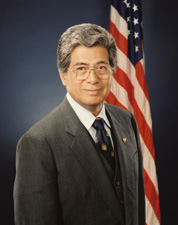

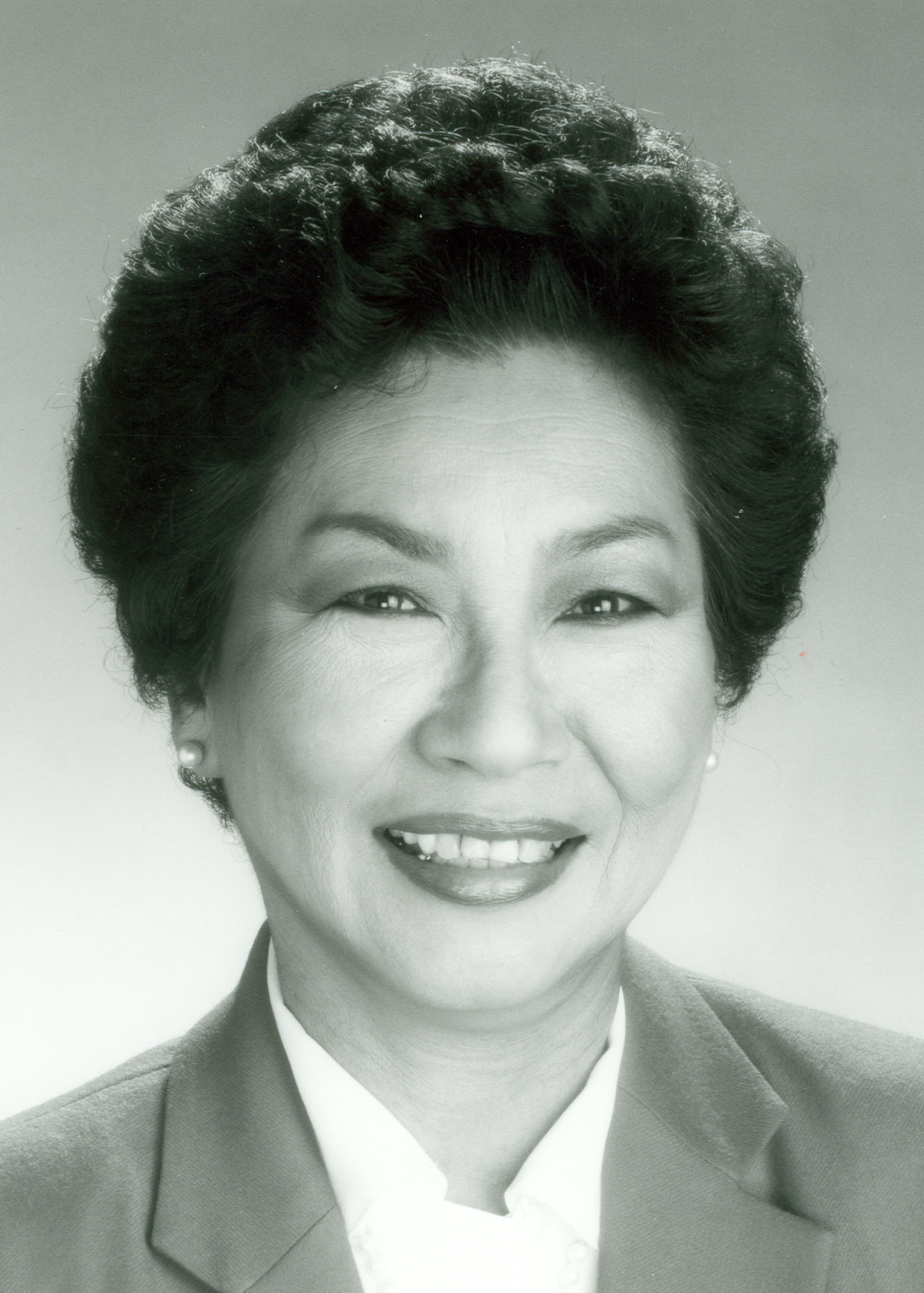
Nominee	Daniel Akaka	Pat Saiki
Party	Democratic	Republican
Popular vote	188,901	155,978
Percentage	54.0%	44.6%
- County results Akaka: 50–60% 60–70%
U.S. senator before election
Daniel Akaka
Democratic
Elected U.S. Senator
Daniel Akaka
Democratic

Incumbent Democrat Daniel Akaka was elected to finish the term ending in 1995 over Republican U.S. Representative Pat Saiki. Akaka had been appointed by Governor John Waihee in April 1990 to fill the vacancy created by the death of Spark Matsunaga.

General election results
Party	Candidate	Votes	%
Democratic	Daniel Akaka (incumbent)	188,901	54.02%
Republican	Pat Saiki	155,978	44.61%
Libertarian	Ken Schoolland	4,787	1.37%
Majority		32,923	9.42%
Turnout		349,666	
Democratic hold			

== Idaho ==
Idaho election
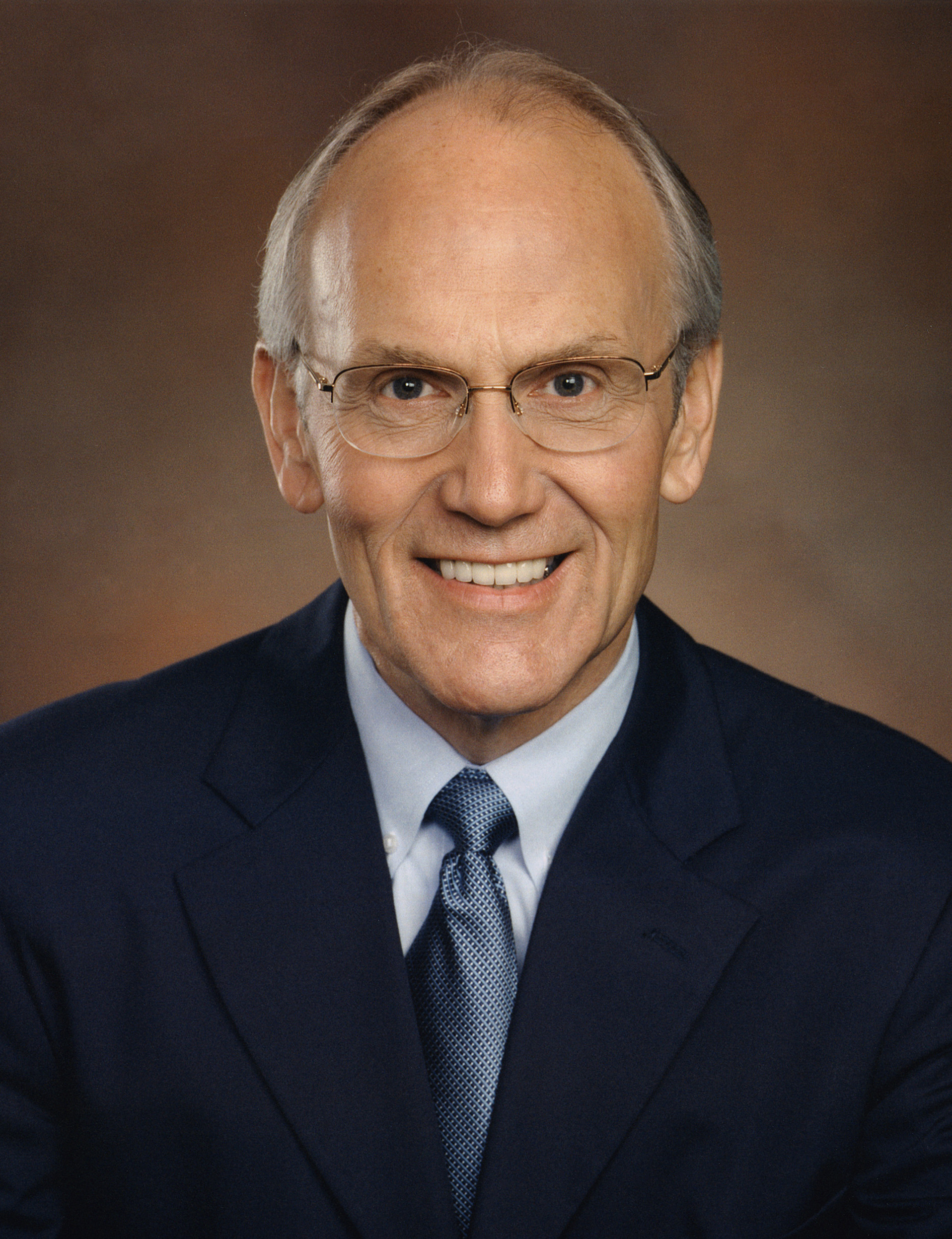

Nominee	Larry Craig	Ron Twilegar
Party	Republican	Democratic
Popular vote	193,641	122,295
Percentage	61.29%	38.71%
- County results Craig: 50–60% 60–70% 70–80% Twilegar: 50–60%
U.S. senator before election
Jim McClure
Republican
Elected U.S. Senator
Larry Craig
Republican

Republican Rep. Larry Craig defeated Democratic former state legislator Ron Twilegar for the seat of U.S. Senator Jim McClure, who did not seek re-election.

General election results
Party	Candidate	Votes	%
Republican	Larry Craig	65,830	59.01%
Republican	Jim Jones	45,733	40.99%

General election results
Party	Candidate	Votes	%
Democratic	Ron Twilegar	30,154	64.51%
Democratic	David C. Steed	16,587	35.49%

General election results
Party	Candidate	Votes	%
Republican	Larry Craig	193,641	61.29%
Democratic	Ron Twilegar	122,295	38.71%
Total votes		315,936	100.00%
Majority		71,346	22.58%
Republican hold			

== Illinois ==
Illinois election
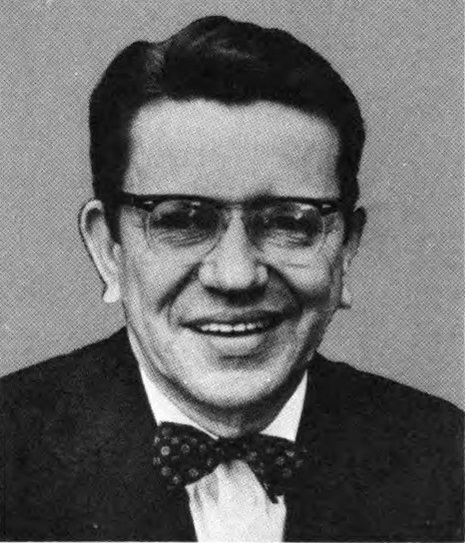

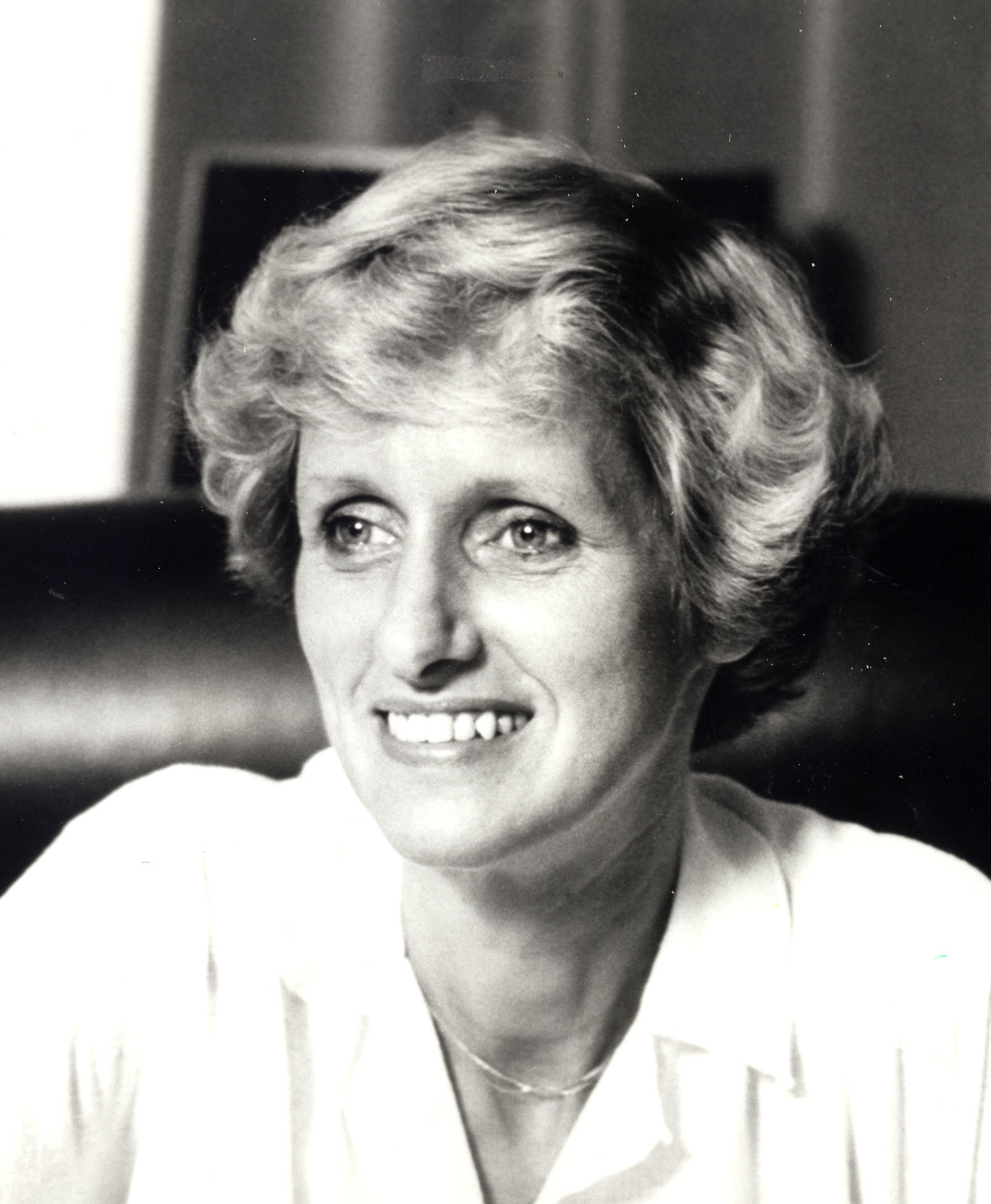
Nominee	Paul Simon	Lynn Morley Martin
Party	Democratic	Republican
Popular vote	2,115,377	1,135,628
Percentage	65.07%	34.93%
- County results Simon: 50–60% 60–70% 70–80% 80–90% Martin: 50–60%
U.S. senator before election
Paul Simon
Democratic
Elected U.S. Senator
Paul Simon
Democratic

Incumbent Democrat Paul Simon sought re-election to the United States Senate. Simon was opposed by Republican nominee Lynn Morley Martin, a United States Congresswoman from Illinois's 16th congressional district, whom he easily defeated to win a second and final term in the Senate.

1990 United States Senate election in Illinois
Party	Candidate	Votes	%	±%
Democratic	Paul Simon (Incumbent)	2,115,377	65.07%	+15.00%
Republican	Lynn Morley Martin	1,135,628	34.93%	−13.28%
Majority		979,749	30.14%	+28.28%
Turnout		3,251,005		
Democratic hold		Swing		

== Indiana (special) ==
Indiana special election
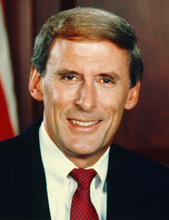

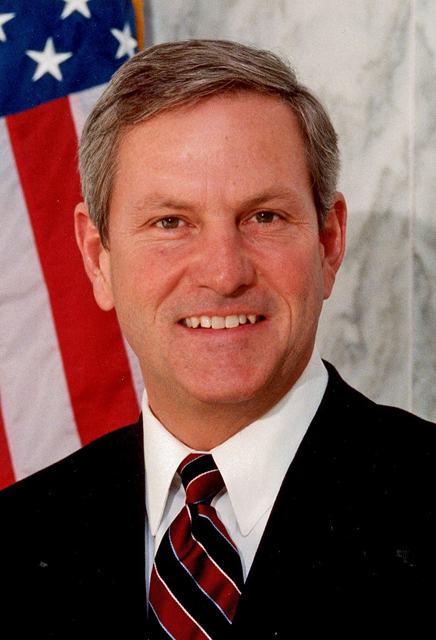
Nominee	Dan Coats	Baron Hill
Party	Republican	Democratic
Popular vote	806,048	696,639
Percentage	53.6%	46.4%
- County results Coats: 50–60% 60–70% 70–80% Hill: 50–60% 60–70%
U.S. senator before election
Dan Coats
Republican
Elected U.S. Senator
Dan Coats
Republican

Incumbent Republican Dan Coats, who was recently appointed to this seat two years prior, won election to serve out the remainder of the term, beating Democratic State Representative Baron Hill.

During the 1988 presidential election, Republican nominee Vice President George H. W. Bush selected U.S. Senator Dan Quayle of Indiana as his vice presidential nominee. The Bush-Quayle ticket defeated the Dukakis–Bentsen ticket in the general election by a 53%-46% margin, capturing 40 states and 426 electoral votes.

In preparation for the pending vacancy, Governor Robert D. Orr appointed four-term U.S. Representative Dan Coats to fill Quayle's seat on December 12, 1988. Coats was a former aide to Quayle, whom he had succeeded as U.S. Representative for Indiana's 4th congressional district in 1981. Quayle eventually resigned his Senate seat on January 3, 1989, and Coats was immediately sworn into office.

Coats used television commercials that raised questions about Hill's consistency in opposing new taxes, and Hill gained notoriety for walking the length of the state to meet voters.

General election results
Party	Candidate	Votes	%	±%
Republican	Dan Coats (Incumbent)	806,048	53.6%	−6.93%
Democratic	Baron Hill	696,639	46.4%	+7.85%
Majority		109,409	7.28%	
Turnout		1,502,687		
Republican hold		Swing		

== Iowa ==
Iowa election
- November 5, 1990
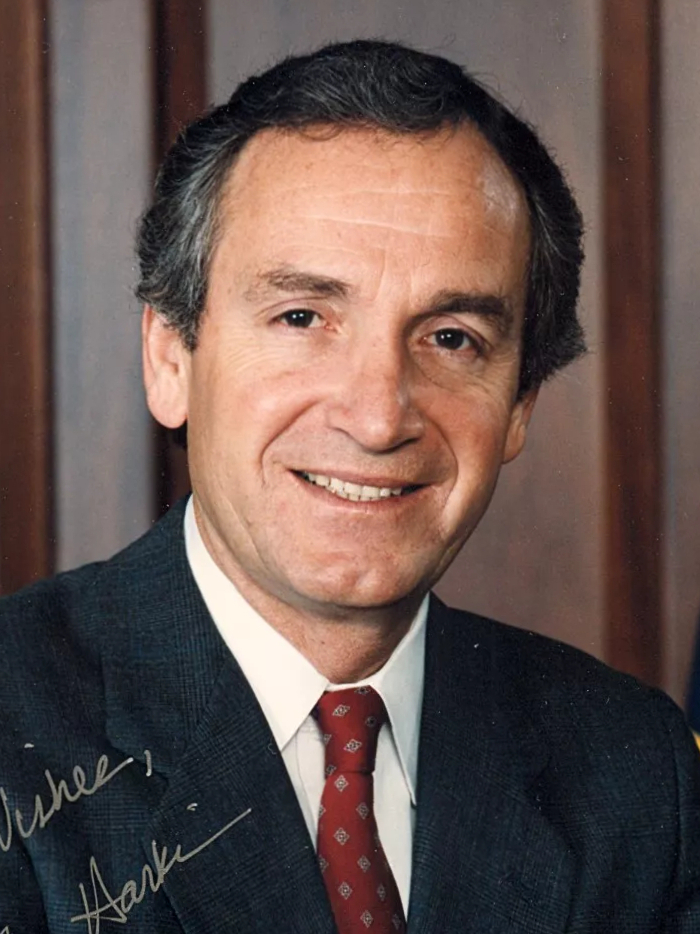

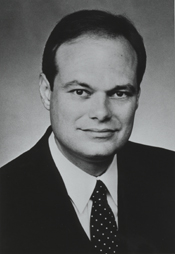
Nominee	Tom Harkin	Tom Tauke
Party	Democratic	Republican
Popular vote	535,975	446,869
Percentage	54.5%	45.4%
- County results Harkin: 50–60% 60–70% Tauke: 50–60% 60–70% 70–80%
U.S. senator before election
Tom Harkin
Democratic
Elected U.S. Senator
Tom Harkin
Democratic

Incumbent Democrat Tom Harkin sought re-election to a second term in the United States Senate. Harkin was opposed by Republican United States Congressman Tom Tauke, from Iowa's 2nd congressional district, and both Harkin and Tauke won their primaries uncontested. Though Harkin performed slightly worse than he had six years earlier, he was successful in his re-election bid and defeated Tauke.

Democratic primary results
Party	Candidate	Votes	%
Democratic	Tom Harkin (Incumbent)	162,661	99.47%
Democratic	Write-ins	867	0.53%
Total votes		163,528	100.00%

Republican primary results
Party	Candidate	Votes	%
Republican	Tom Tauke	91,798	99.81%
Republican	Write-ins	172	0.19%
Total votes		91,970	100.00%

1990 United States Senate election in Iowa
Party	Candidate	Votes	%	±%
Democratic	Tom Harkin (Incumbent)	535,975	54.47%	−0.98%
Republican	Tom Tauke	446,869	45.42%	+1.76%
Write-ins		1,089	0.11%	
Majority		89,106	9.06%	−2.74%
Turnout		983,933		
Democratic hold		Swing		

== Kansas ==
Kansas election
- November 6, 1990
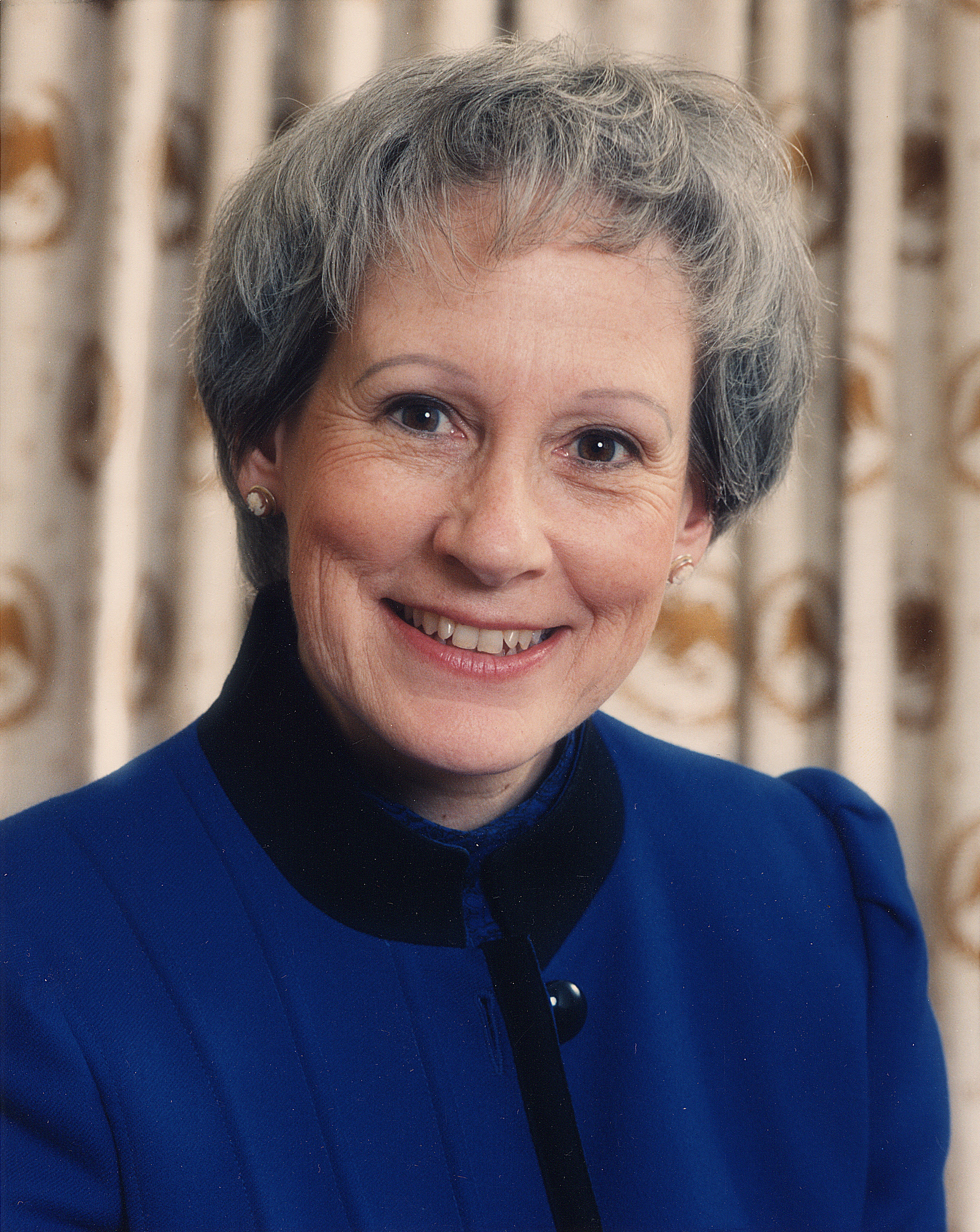

Nominee	Nancy Kassebaum	Dick Williams
Party	Republican	Democratic
Popular vote	578,605	207,491
Percentage	73.6%	26.4%
- County results Kassebaum: 60–70% 70–80% 80–90%
U.S. senator before election
Nancy Kassebaum
Republican
Elected U.S. Senator
Nancy Kassebaum
Republican

Incumbent Republican Nancy Kassebaum won re-election to her third full term, over Democrat Dick Williams, an educator at Wichita State University

General election results
Party	Candidate	Votes	%
Republican	Nancy Kassebaum (Incumbent)	578,605	73.6%
Democratic	Dick Williams	207,491	26.4%
Total votes		786,096	100.00%
Majority		371,114	47.2%
Republican hold			

== Kentucky ==
Kentucky election
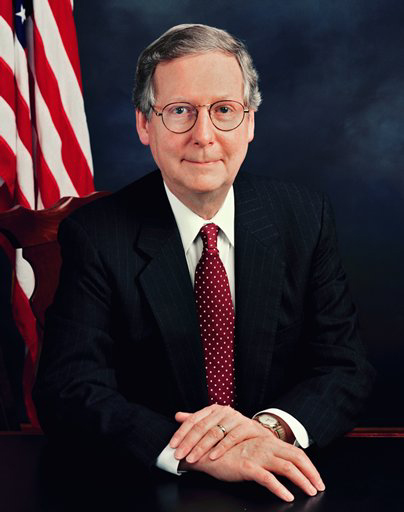

Nominee	Mitch McConnell	Harvey Sloane
Party	Republican	Democratic
Popular vote	478,034	437,976
Percentage	52.2%	47.8%
- County results McConnell: 50–60% 60–70% 70–80% 80–90% Sloane: 50–60% 60–70% 70–80%
U.S. senator before election
Mitch McConnell
Republican
Elected U.S. Senator
Mitch McConnell
Republican

Incumbent Republican Mitch McConnell won re-election to a second term over Democrat Harvey Sloane, former Mayor of Louisville

Democratic primary results
Party	Candidate	Votes	%
Democratic	Harvey I. Sloane	183,789	59.27%
Democratic	John Brock	126,318	40.73%
Total votes		310,107	100.00%

Republican primary results
Party	Candidate	Votes	%
Republican	Mitch McConnell (Incumbent)	64,063	88.52%
Republican	Tommy Klein	8,310	11.48%
Total votes		72,373	100.00%

General election results
Party	Candidate	Votes	%	±%
Republican	Mitch McConnell (Incumbent)	478,034	52.19%	+2.28%
Democratic	Harvey I. Sloane	437,976	47.81%	−1.68%
Majority		40,058	4.37%	+3.97%
Turnout		916,010		
Republican hold		Swing		

== Louisiana ==
Louisiana election
- November 6, 1990
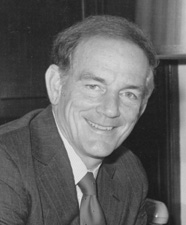

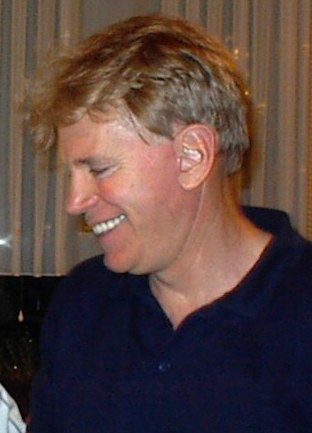
Nominee	J. Bennett Johnston	David Duke
Party	Democratic	Republican
Popular vote	753,198	607,051
Percentage	53.95%	43.48%
- Parish results Johnston: 40–50% 50–60% 60–70% 70–80% Duke: 40–50% 50–60% 60–70%
U.S. senator before election
J. Bennett Johnston
Democratic
Elected U.S. Senator
J. Bennett Johnston
Democratic

Incumbent Democrat J. Bennett Johnston Jr. won re-election to a fourth term and avoided a runoff, beating Republican David Duke, State Representative and former Grand Wizard of the Ku Klux Klan.

This election was viewed at the onset as potentially competitive, as Senator Johnston was viewed as vulnerable in light of Louisiana's economic troubles at the time and Senator Johnston's voting record viewed by Republicans as too liberal. The Republican Party leadership endorsed the candidacy of State Senator Ben Bagert, who was picked over Secretary of State Fox McKeithen, State Representative Quentin Dastugue and State Representative David Duke. David Duke, however, continued his candidacy and slowly overtook Bagert in attention and in the polls. Duke attracted national attention to the race with his involvement with white supremacist groups and his appeals to white resentment over affirmative-action programs. With Bagert failing to gain traction, the National Republican Senatorial Committee tried to recruit former Governor David Treen to jump into the race. When Treen passed, the effort turned from supporting Bagert to stopping Duke.

As the election drew near, polls showed Johnston firmly in first place, with Duke in second place and Bagert trailing far behind at third. National Republicans grew fearful that Bagert's candidacy would only serve to force a runoff and that a potential runoff election with Duke being the de facto Republican nominee would hurt the national brand. On October 4, eight Republican Senators endorsed Johnston, with Senator John Danforth saying at the press conference that "all of us would be embarrassed and mortified to have to serve in the United States Senate with David Duke masquerading as a Republican." Bagert dropped out of the race the next day, announcing that "it became more and more apparent, that instead of forcing a runoff between myself and Bennett Johnston, I might very well be forcing a runoff between somebody else and Bennett Johnston." He announced he would "reluctantly" vote for Johnston. Bagert's name remained on the ballot, but under state law his votes could not be counted as part of the official tally. After Bagert dropped out, HUD Secretary Jack Kemp endorsed Johnston, saying "there's no place in the Republican Party for someone who has practiced and practices racism, bigotry and anti-Semitism."

United States Senate Election, 1990
Party	Candidate	Votes	%
Democratic	J. Bennett Johnston Jr. (Incumbent)	753,198	53.95%
Republican	David Duke	607,091	43.48%
Democratic	Nick Joseph Accardo	21,578	1.55%
Democratic	Larry Crowe	14,345	1.03%
Majority		146,107	10.47%
Total votes		1,396,212	100.00%
Democratic hold			

== Maine ==
Maine election
- November 6, 1990
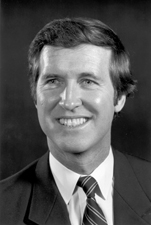

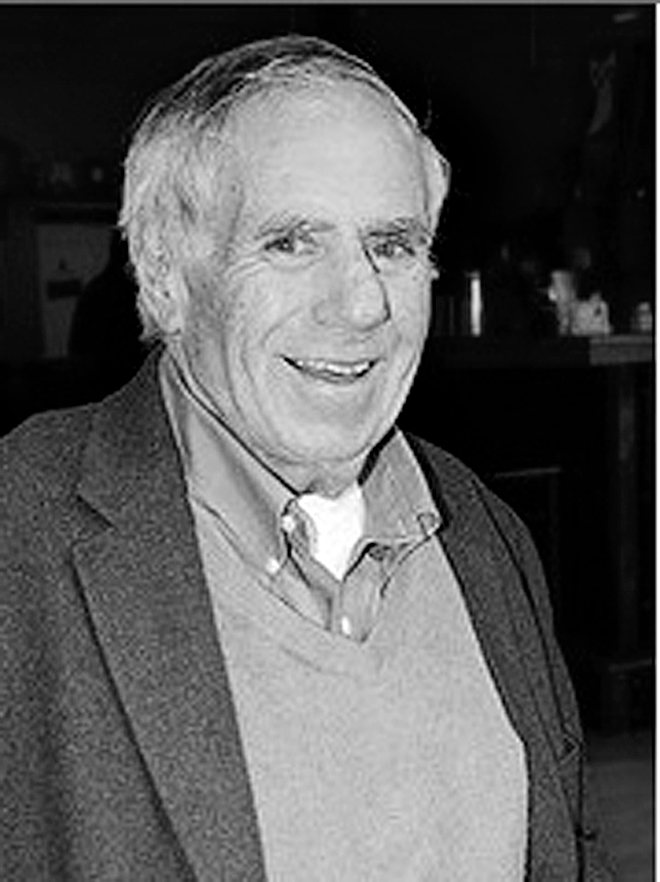
Nominee	William Cohen	Neil Rolde
Party	Republican	Democratic
Popular vote	319,167	201,053
Percentage	61.3%	38.6%
- County results Cohen: 50–60% 60–70%
U.S. senator before election
William Cohen
Republican
Elected U.S. Senator
William Cohen
Republican

Incumbent Republican William Cohen won re-election to a third term over Democratic State Representative Neil Rolde.

General election results
Party	Candidate	Votes	%
Republican	William Cohen (Incumbent)	319,167	61.3%
Democratic	Neil Rolde	201,053	38.6%
Total votes		520,220	100.00%
Majority		118,114	22.7%
Republican hold			

== Massachusetts ==
Massachusetts election
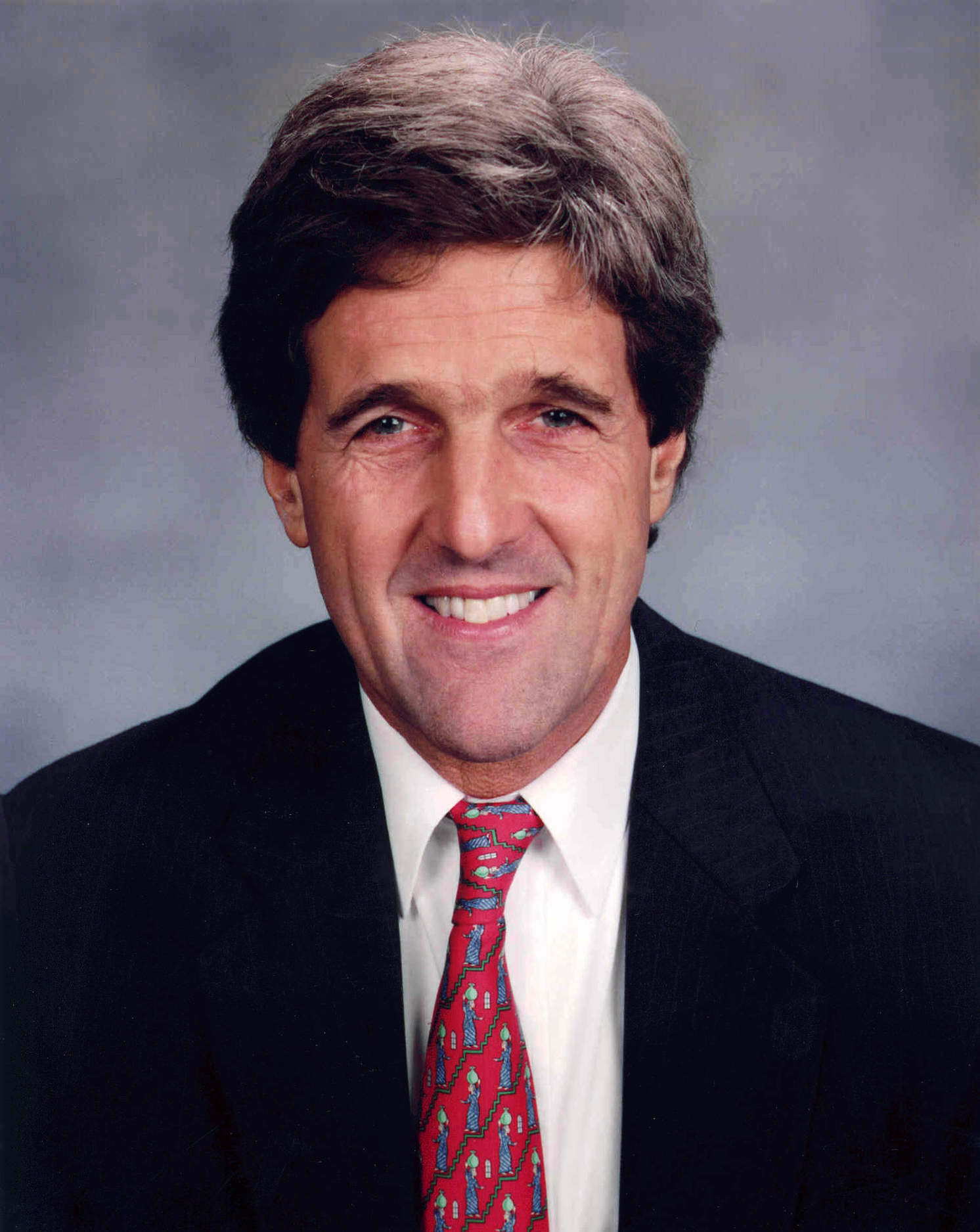

Nominee	John Kerry	Jim Rappaport
Party	Democratic	Republican
Popular vote	1,321,712	992,917
Percentage	54.5%	41.0%

Kerry
40–50%
50–60%
60–70%
70–80%
80–90%
Rappaport
50–60%
60–70%
70–80%
Tie
40–50%
U.S. senator before election
John Kerry
Democratic
Elected U.S. Senator
John Kerry
Democratic

Incumbent Democratic U.S. Senator John Kerry was re-elected to his second term over Republican real estate developer Jim Rappaport.

Massachusetts United States Senate Republican primary, 1990
Party	Candidate	Votes	%
Republican	Jim Rappaport	265,093	66.12%
Republican	Daniel W. Daly	135,647	33.38%
	All others	202	0.05%

General election results
Party	Candidate	Votes	%
Democratic	John Kerry (Incumbent)	1,321,712	54.51%
Republican	Jim Rappaport	992,917	40.95%
Independent	David Pover	109,950	4.54%
Turnout		2,424,579	100.00%
Majority		328,795	13.56%
Democratic hold			

== Michigan ==
Michigan election
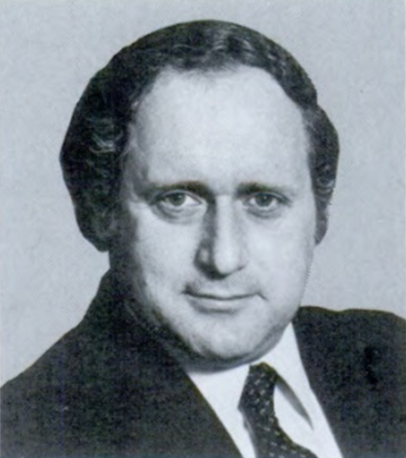

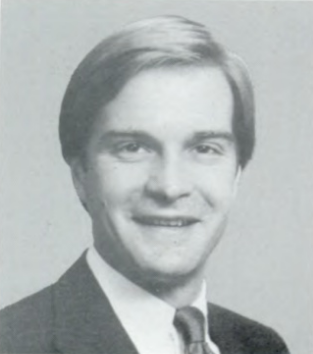
Nominee	Carl Levin	Bill Schuette
Party	Democratic	Republican
Popular vote	1,471,753	1,055,695
Percentage	57.5%	41.2%
- County results Levin: 40–50% 50–60% 60–70% 70–80% Schuette: 40–50% 50–60% 60–70%
U.S. senator before election
Carl Levin
Democratic
Elected U.S. Senator
Carl Levin
Democratic

Incumbent Democrat Carl Levin won re-election to a third term, beating Republican U.S. Representative Bill Schuette.

General election results
Party	Candidate	Votes	%
Democratic	Carl Levin (Incumbent)	1,471,753	57.4%
Republican	Bill Schuette	1,055,695	41.2%
Workers World	Susan Farquhar	32,796	1.3%
Total votes		2,560,244	100.00%
Majority		416,058	16.2%
Democratic hold			

== Minnesota ==
Minnesota election
- November 6, 1990
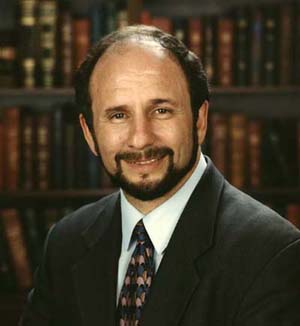

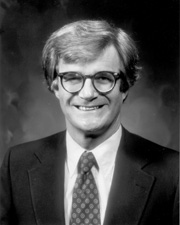
Nominee	Paul Wellstone	Rudy Boschwitz
Party	Democratic (DFL)	Ind.-Republican
Popular vote	911,999	864,375
Percentage	50.5%	47.9%
- County results Wellstone: 40–50% 50–60% 60–70% Boschwitz: 40–50% 50–60% 60–70%
U.S. senator before election
Rudy Boschwitz
Ind.-Republican
Elected U.S. Senator
Paul Wellstone
Democratic (DFL)

Incumbent Republican Rudy Boschwitz was defeated by Democratic challenger Paul Wellstone in a tight race. Widely considered an underdog and outspent by a 7-to-1 margin, Wellstone, a professor at Carleton College and nominee for Minnesota State Auditor in 1982 was the only candidate to defeat an incumbent senator in the 1990 election cycle and gained national attention after his upset victory.

General election results
Party	Candidate	Votes	%
Democratic (DFL)	Paul Wellstone	911,999	50.49%
Ind.-Republican	Rudy Boschwitz (Incumbent)	864,375	47.86%
Grassroots	Russell B. Bentley	29,820	1.65%
Total votes		1,806,194	100.00%
Majority		47,624	2.63%
Democratic (DFL) gain from Republican			

== Mississippi ==
Mississippi election
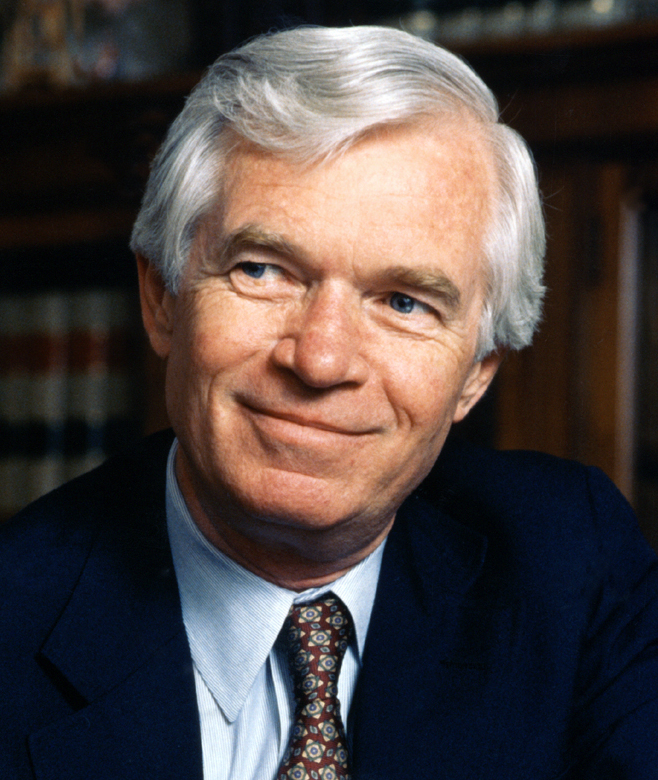
Nominee	Thad Cochran
Party	Republican
Popular vote	274,244
Percentage	100.0%
- County results Cochran: >90% No votes
U.S. senator before election
Thad Cochran
Republican
Elected U.S. Senator
Thad Cochran
Republican

Incumbent Republican Thad Cochran won re-election to a third term. Cochran won unanimously, with 100% of the vote like Sam Nunn in Georgia the same year. Other elections like the 1958 senate race for Mississippi's senate seat resulted in the same margin of victory via John Stennis, and John Thune in the 2010 race in South Dakota.

1990 Mississippi United States Senate election
Party	Candidate	Votes	%
Republican	Thad Cochran (Incumbent)	274,244	100.00%
Total votes		274,244	100.00%
Republican hold			

== Montana ==
Montana election
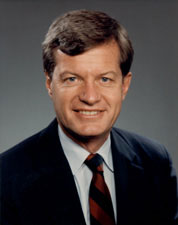

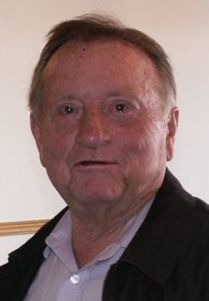
Nominee	Max Baucus	Allen Kolstad
Party	Democratic	Republican
Popular vote	217,563	93,836
Percentage	68.13%	29.38%
- County results Baucus: 50–60% 60–70% 70–80% 80–90% Kostad: 40–50%
U.S. senator before election
Max Baucus
Democratic
Elected U.S. Senator
Max Baucus
Democratic

Incumbent United States Senator Max Baucus, who was first elected in 1978 and was re-elected in 1984, ran for re-election. After winning the Democratic primary, he moved on to the general election, where he was opposed by Allen Kolstad, the Lieutenant Governor of Montana and the Republican nominee. Baucus ultimately ended up defeating Kolstad in a landslide, winning his third term with ease.

Democratic Party primary results
Party	Candidate	Votes	%
Democratic	Max Baucus (Incumbent)	80,622	82.60%
Democratic	John Driscoll	12,616	12.93%
Democratic	"Curly" Thornton	4,367	4.47%
Total votes		97,605	100.00%

Republican Primary results
Party	Candidate	Votes	%
Republican	Allen Kolstad	38,097	43.59%
Republican	Bruce Vorhauer	30,837	35.28%
Republican	Bill Farrell	11,820	13.52%
Republican	John Domenech	6,648	7.61%
Total votes		87,402	100.00%

1990 United States Senate election in Montana
Party	Candidate	Votes	%	±%
Democratic	Max Baucus (Incumbent)	217,563	68.13%	+11.24%
Republican	Allen Kolstad	93,836	29.38%	−11.31%
Libertarian	Westley F. Deitchler	7,937	2.49%	+0.07%
Majority		123,727	38.75%	+22.55%
Turnout		319,336		
Democratic hold		Swing		

== Nebraska ==
Nebraska election
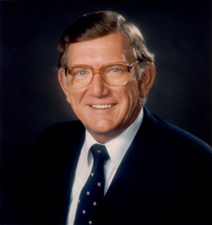

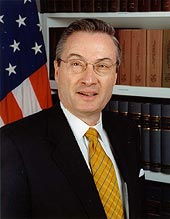
Nominee	J. James Exon	Hal Daub
Party	Democratic	Republican
Popular vote	349,779	243,013
Percentage	58.9%	40.9%
- County results Exon: 50–60% 60–70% 70–80% Daub: 50-60% 60-70% 70-80% 80-90%
U.S. senator before election
J. James Exon
Democratic
Elected U.S. Senator
J. James Exon
Democratic

Incumbent Democrat J. James Exon won re-election to a third term, beating Republican U.S. Representative Hal Daub.

General election results
Party	Candidate	Votes	%	±%
Democratic	J. James Exon (Incumbent)	379,933	58.90%	+6.97%
Republican	Hal Daub	243,013	40.92%	−7.09%
Write-ins		1,036	0.17%	
Majority		106,766	17.98%	+14.06%
Turnout		593,828		
Democratic hold		Swing		

== New Hampshire ==
New Hampshire election
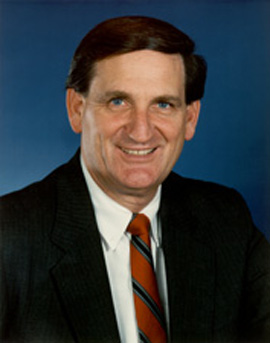

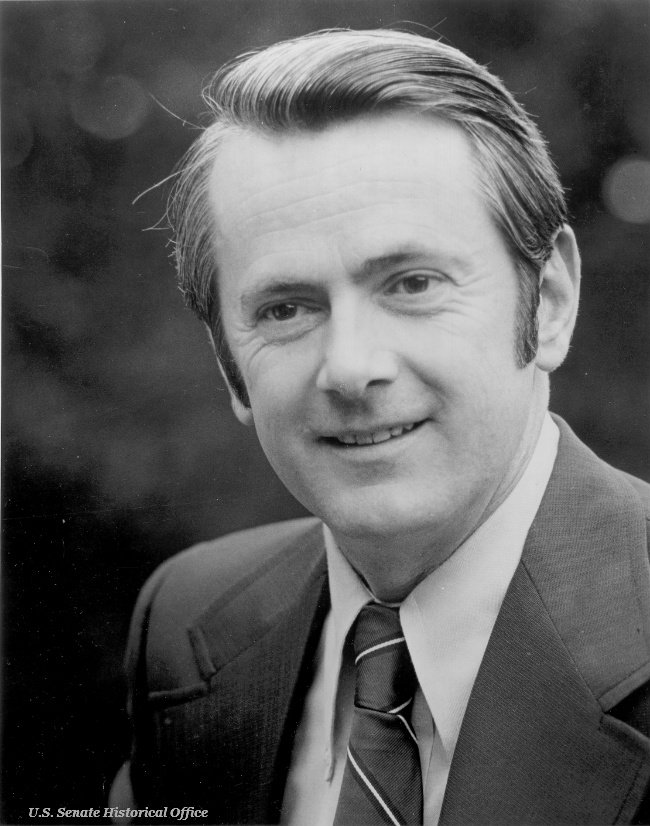
Nominee	Bob Smith	John A. Durkin
Party	Republican	Democratic
Popular vote	189,792	91,299
Percentage	65.1%	31.3%
- Smith: 40–50% 50–60% 60–70% 70–80% 80–90% >90% Durkin: 40–50% 50–60% >90%
U.S. senator before election
Gordon J. Humphrey
Republican
Elected U.S. Senator
Bob Smith
Republican

Incumbent Republican Gordon J. Humphrey decided to retire and not run for re-election to a third term. Republican Bob Smith won the open seat, beating Democratic former Senator John A. Durkin.

General election results
Party	Candidate	Votes	%
Republican	Bob Smith	189,792	65.13%
Democratic	John A. Durkin	91,299	31.33%
Libertarian	John G. Elsnau	9,102	3.34%
	Write-In Candidates	585	0.20%
Majority		98,493	33.80%
Turnout		291,393	
Republican hold			

== New Jersey ==
New Jersey election
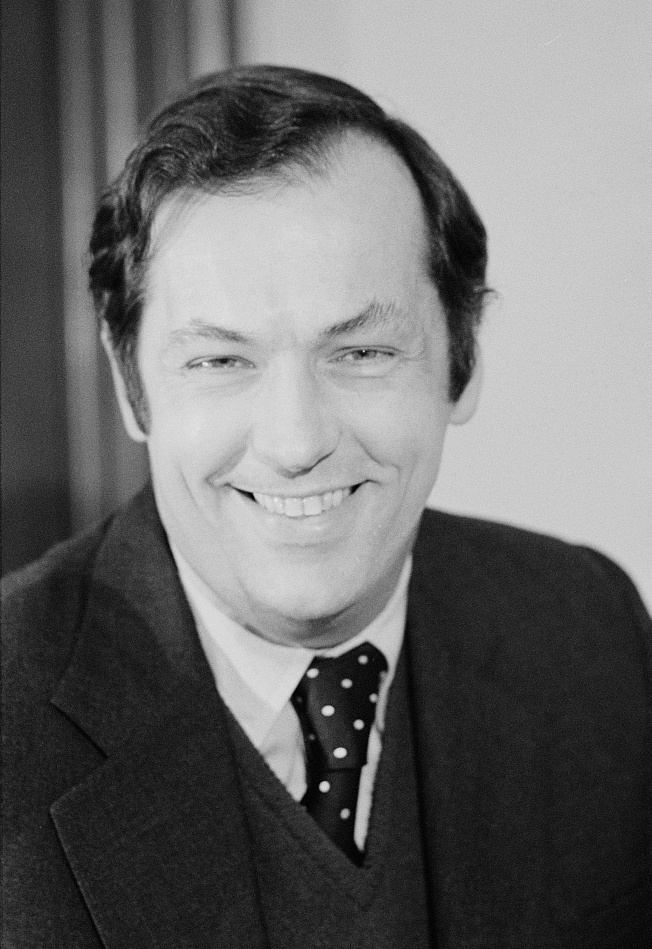

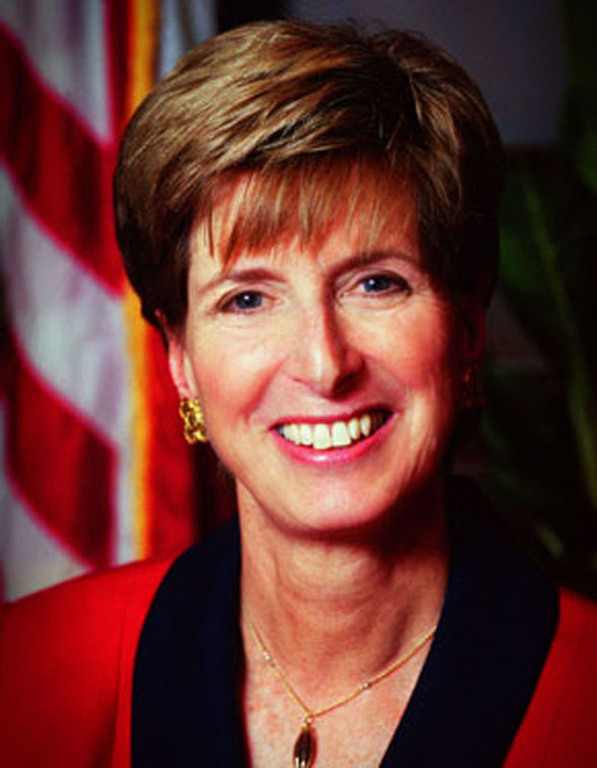
Nominee	Bill Bradley	Christine Todd Whitman
Party	Democratic	Republican
Popular vote	977,810	918,874
Percentage	50.44%	47.40%
- County results Bradley: 40–50% 50–60% 60–70% Whitman: 40–50% 50–60% 60–70%
U.S. senator before election
Bill Bradley
Democratic
Elected U.S. Senator
Bill Bradley
Democratic

Democratic Senator Bill Bradley decided to seek re-election and narrowly edged out little-known Republican Christine Todd Whitman, President of the New Jersey Board of Public Utilities.

Senator Bill Bradley didn't realize he was in trouble of winning re-election and the New Jersey voters' anger over taxes and economy until the week prior to the election.

The senator had a major image problem. In the early part of the campaign Bradley was winning easily in the polls, so his staffers told him to play it safe. He sent out television advertisements of himself walking on the beach, shooting a perfect shot on the court, and sitting back in his office with his basketball shoes onto his desk. The advertisements backfired as voters were turned off and thought that he hadn't taken his job as Senator seriously, at a time when New Jersey voters were suffering.

Another major problem with Bradley was how Democratic Governor Jim Florio implemented a $2.8 billion tax increase, hurting the state's economy. In addition, Bradley refused to answer questions pertaining to Florio's tax policies.

After Bradley realized he was in trouble he released negative advertisements. They attacked Whitman's own record on taxes, accusing her of favoring tax increases when she was a Somerset County Freeholder. Bradley's image may have been further damaged by his newer advertisements.

1990 New Jersey United States Senate election
Party	Candidate	Votes	%
Democratic	Bill Bradley (Incumbent)	977,810	50.4%
Republican	Christine Todd Whitman	918,874	47.4%
Populist	John Kucek	19,978	1.0%
Libertarian	Louis Stefanelli	13,988	0.7%
Socialist Workers	Don Mackle	7,804	0.4%
Total votes		1,938,454	100.0%
Democratic hold			

== New Mexico ==
New Mexico election
- November 5, 1990
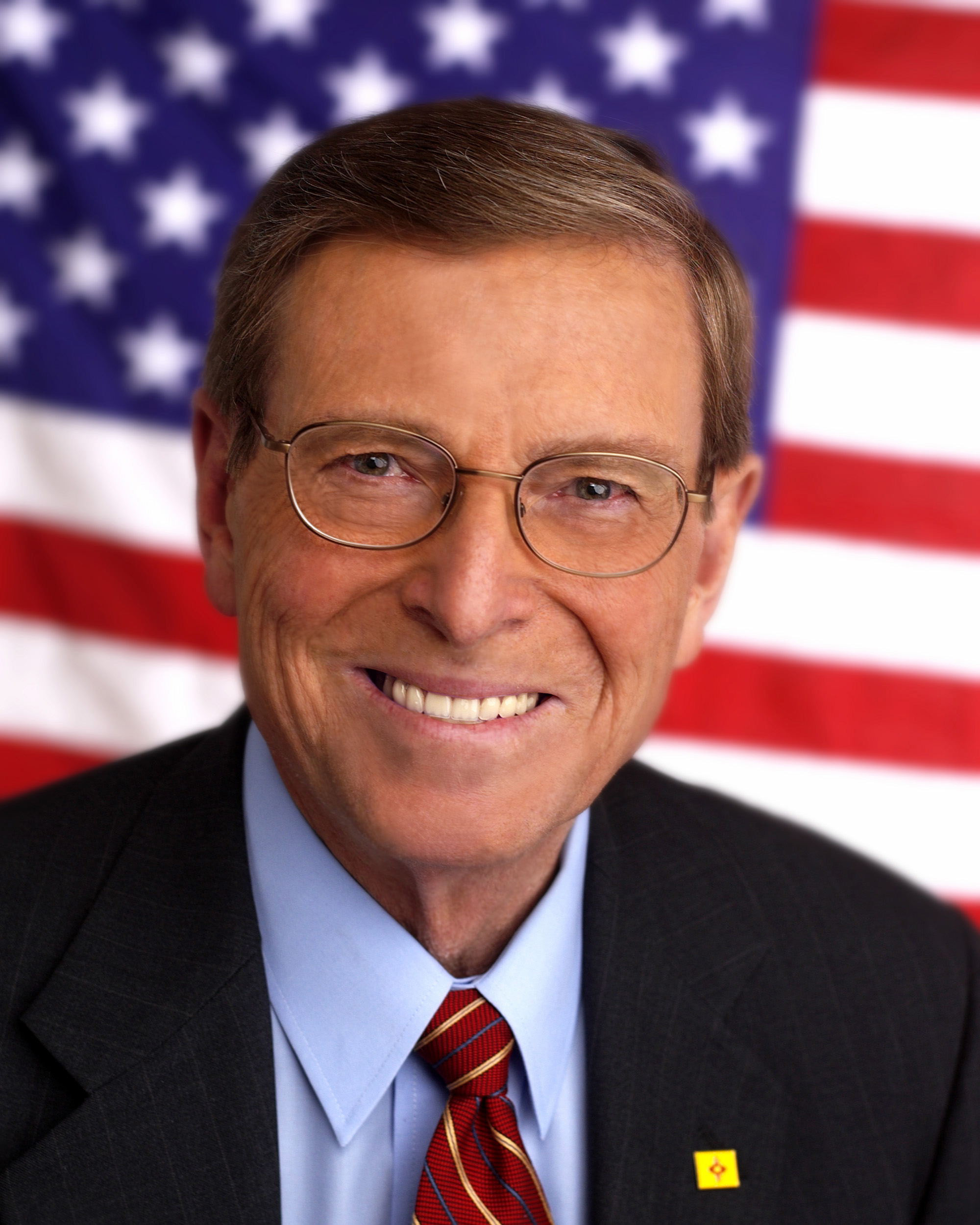

Nominee	Pete Domenici	Tom Benavidez
Party	Republican	Democratic
Popular vote	296,712	110,033
Percentage	72.9%	27.0%
- County results Domenici: 50–60% 60–70% 70–80% 80–90%
U.S. senator before election
Pete Domenici
Republican
Elected U.S. Senator
Pete Domenici
Republican

Incumbent Republican Pete Domenici won re-election to a fourth term over Democratic State Senator Tom Benavidez.

General election results
Party	Candidate	Votes	%
Republican	Pete Domenici (Incumbent)	296,712	72.9%
Democratic	Tom Benavidez	110,033	27.0%
Total votes		406,745	100.00%
Majority		186,679	45.9%
Republican hold			

== North Carolina ==
North Carolina election
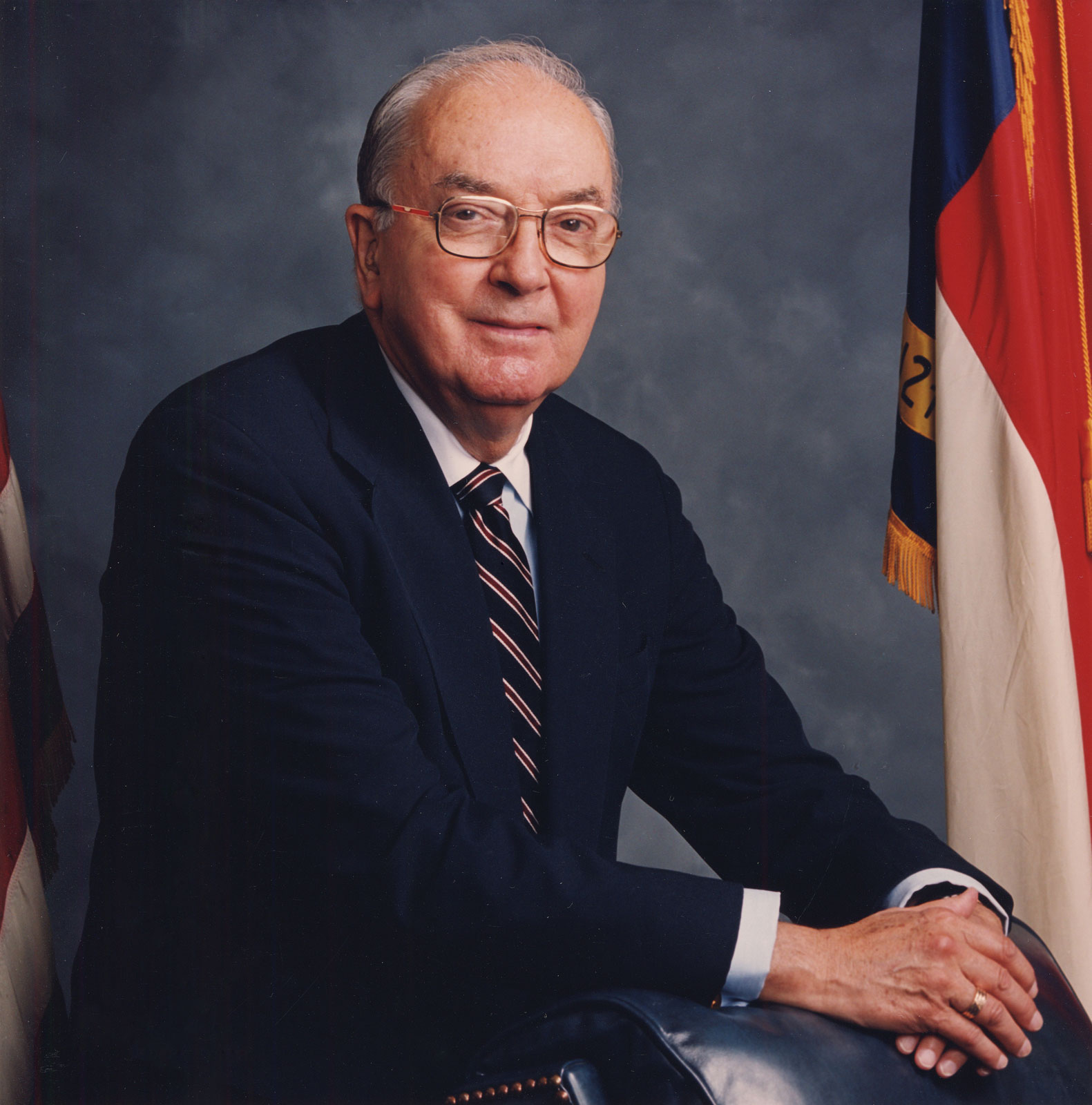

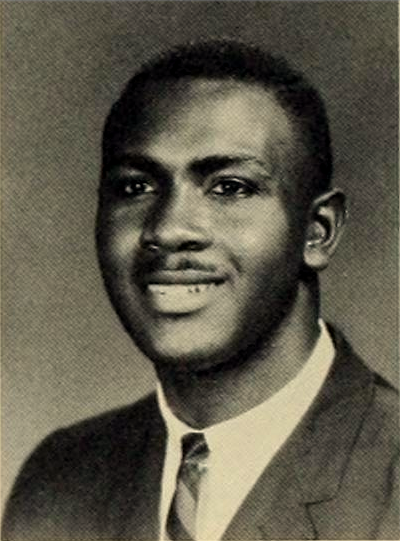
Nominee	Jesse Helms	Harvey Gantt
Party	Republican	Democratic
Popular vote	1,089,012	981,573
Percentage	52.58%	47.39%
- Helms: 50–60% 60–70% 70–80% Gantt: 50–60% 60–70% 70–80%
U.S. senator before election
Jesse Helms
Republican
Elected U.S. Senator
Jesse Helms
Republican

The election was fought between the Republican incumbent Jesse Helms and the Democratic nominee Mayor of Charlotte Harvey Gantt. Helms won re-election to a fourth term by a slightly wider margin than the close election in 1984.

Helms drew controversy for airing what became known as the "Hands" ad produced by Alex Castellanos. It showed a pair of white hands with the voiceover saying "You needed that job, and you were the best qualified. But they had to give it to a minority because of a racial quota." The ad prompted allegations of racism.

1990 North Carolina U.S. Senate Republican primary election
Party	Candidate	Votes	%	±%
Republican	Jesse Helms (Incumbent)	157,345	84.32%	−6.33%
Republican	L. C. Nixon	15,355	8.23%	N/A
Republican	George Wimbish	13,895	7.45%	−1.90%
Turnout		186,595		

1990 North Carolina U.S. Senate Democratic primary election – First round
Party	Candidate	Votes	%	±%
Democratic	Harvey Gantt	260,179	37.52%	N/A
Democratic	Mike Easley	209,934	30.27%	N/A
Democratic	John Ingram	120,990	17.45%	−8.78%
Democratic	R. P. Thomas	82,883	11.95%	N/A
Democratic	Lloyd Gardner	11,528	1.66%	N/A
Democratic	Robert Hannan	7,982	1.15%	N/A
Turnout		693,496		

1990 North Carolina U.S. Senate Democratic primary election – Second round
Party	Candidate	Votes	%	±%
Democratic	Harvey Gantt	273,567	56.89%	+19.37%
Democratic	Mike Easley	207,283	43.11%	+12.84%
Turnout		480,850		

1990 North Carolina U.S. Senate election
Party	Candidate	Votes	%	±%
Republican	Jesse Helms (Incumbent)	1,089,012	52.58%	+0.92%
Democratic	Harvey Gantt	981,573	47.39%	−0.42%
Socialist Workers	Rich Stuart	681	0.03%	−0.08%
Turnout		2,071,266		
Majority		107,439	5.19%	
Republican hold				

== Oklahoma ==
Oklahoma election
- November 6, 1990
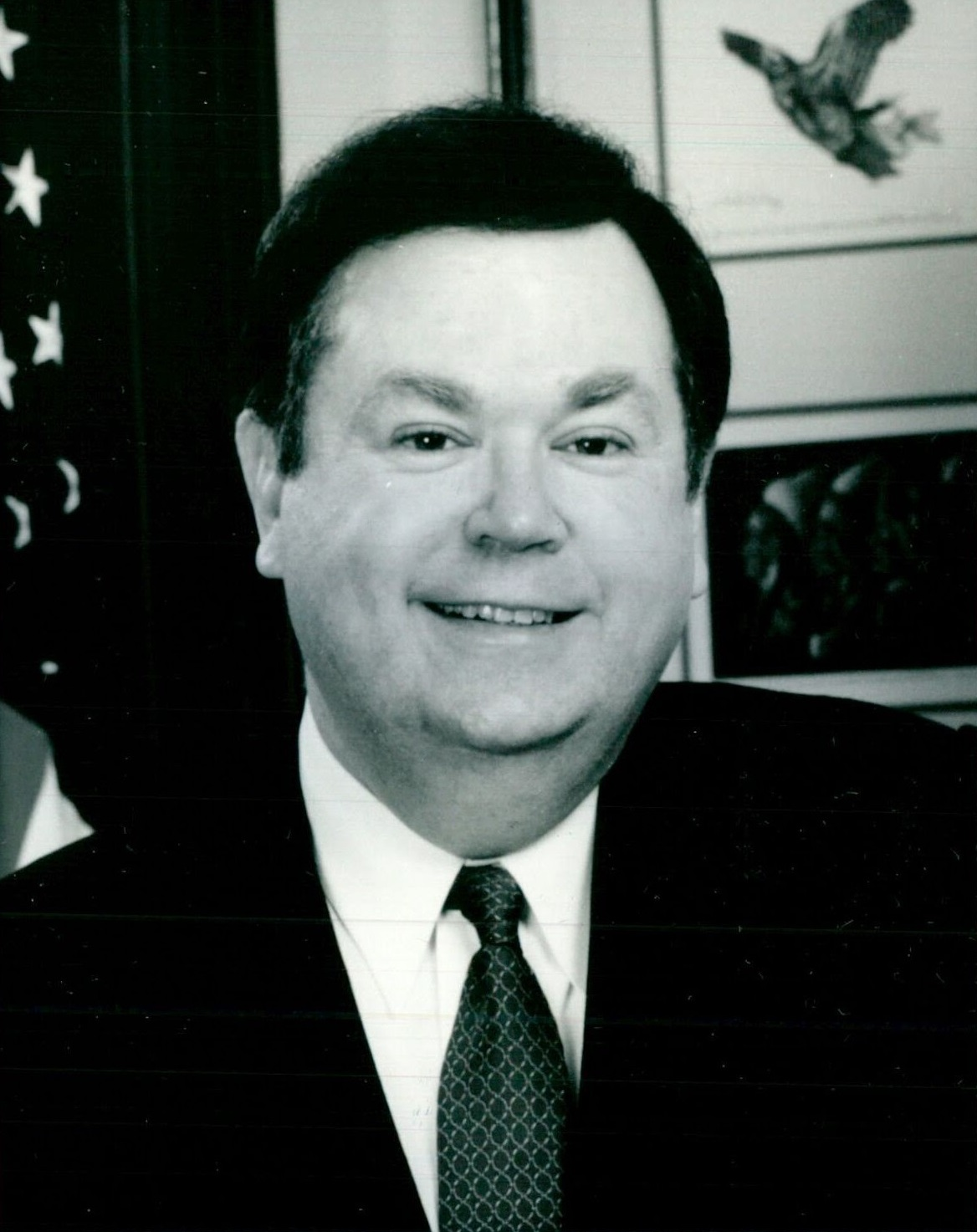

Nominee	David Boren	Stephen Jones
Party	Democratic	Republican
Popular vote	735,684	148,814
Percentage	83.2%	16.8%
- County results Boren: 60–70% 70–80% 80–90% >90%

Incumbent Democrat David Boren won re-election to a third term over Republican nominee attorney Stephen Jones. Boren won over 80 percent of the vote and all of the states counties.

With his victory Boren became the last Democrat to represent Oklahoma in the Senate.

1990 United States Senate election in Oklahoma
Party	Candidate	Votes	%
Democratic	David Boren (Incumbent)	735,684	83.2%
Republican	Stephen Jones	148,814	16.8%
Majority		586,870	66.4%
Total votes		884,498	100.00%
Democratic hold			

== Oregon ==
Oregon election
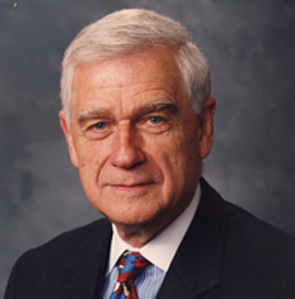

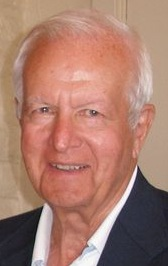
Nominee	Mark Hatfield	Harry Lonsdale
Party	Republican	Democratic
Popular vote	590,095	507,743
Percentage	53.7%	46.2%
- County results Hatfield: 40-50% 50-60% 60-70% Lonsdale: 40–50% 50–60%
U.S. senator before election
Mark Hatfield
Republican
Elected U.S. Senator
Mark Hatfield
Republican

Republican Mark Hatfield was re-elected to a fifth term, defeating Democratic businessman Harry Lonsdale. Hatfield faced minimal opposition in the Republican primary, his only major competition was from environmentalist and former Eugene, Oregon mayoral candidate Randy Prince. Hatfield easily defeated Prince receiving nearly eighty percent of the vote. Lonsdale, who had founded the biotechnology company Bend Research, announced in early 1990 that he intended to challenge Hatfield over his ties to special interest groups, and his opposition to abortion rights. During the primary, Lonsdale largely ignored his Democratic opposition opting to directly criticize Hattfield. Despite close polling, Hatfield won all but four counties and won the popular vote by over seven points.

1990 United States Senate election in Oregon
Party	Candidate	Votes	%
Republican	Mark Hatfield (Incumbent)	590,095	53.68%
Democratic	Harry Lonsdale	507,743	46.19%
Write-In	Misc.	1,417	0.13%
Total votes		1,099,255	100.00%
Republican hold			

== Rhode Island ==
Rhode Island election
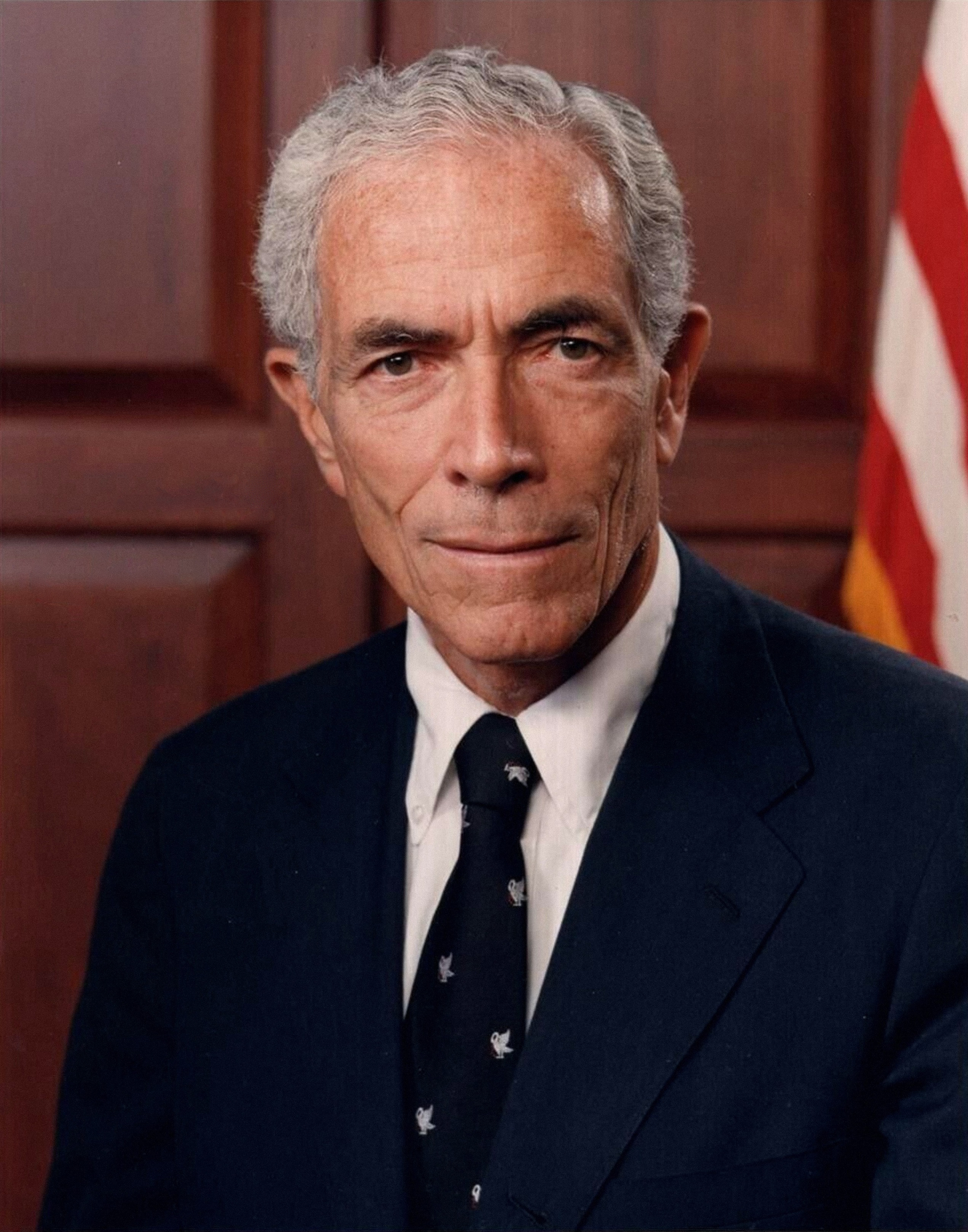

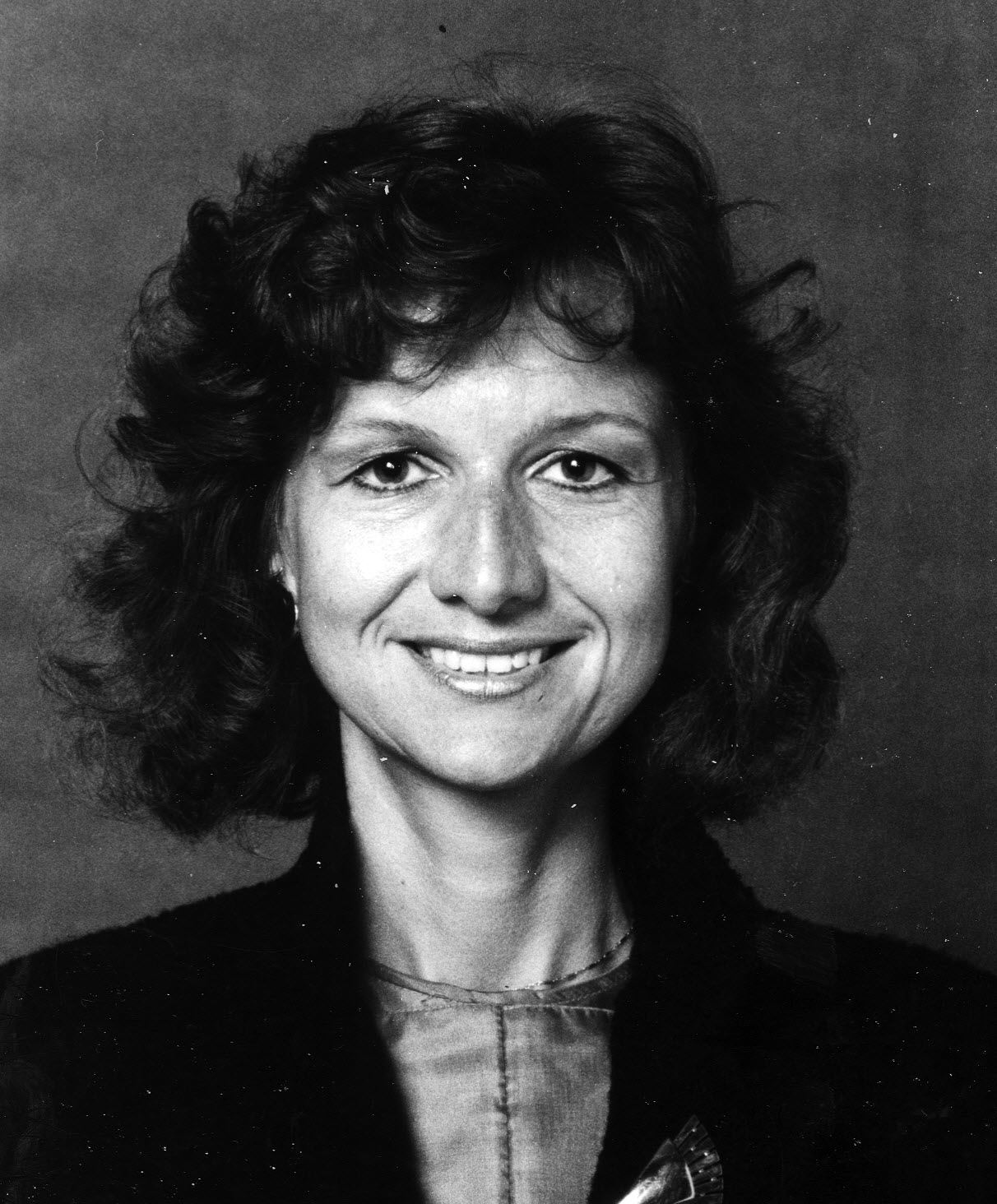
Nominee	Claiborne Pell	Claudine Schneider
Party	Democratic	Republican
Popular vote	225,105	138,947
Percentage	61.8%	38.2%
- Pell: 50–60% 60–70% 70–80% Schneider: 50–60%
U.S. senator before election
Claiborne Pell
Democratic
Elected U.S. Senator
Claiborne Pell
Democratic

Democratic Incumbent Claiborne Pell defeated Republican Representative Claudine Schneider in a landslide.

1990 United States Senate election in Rhode Island
Party	Candidate	Votes	%	±%
Democratic	Claiborne Pell (Incumbent)	225,105	61.83%	−10.83%
Republican	Claudine Schneider	138,947	38.17%	+10.83%
Majority		86,158	23.67%	−21.65%
Turnout		364,062		
Democratic hold		Swing		

== South Carolina ==
South Carolina election
- November 6, 1990
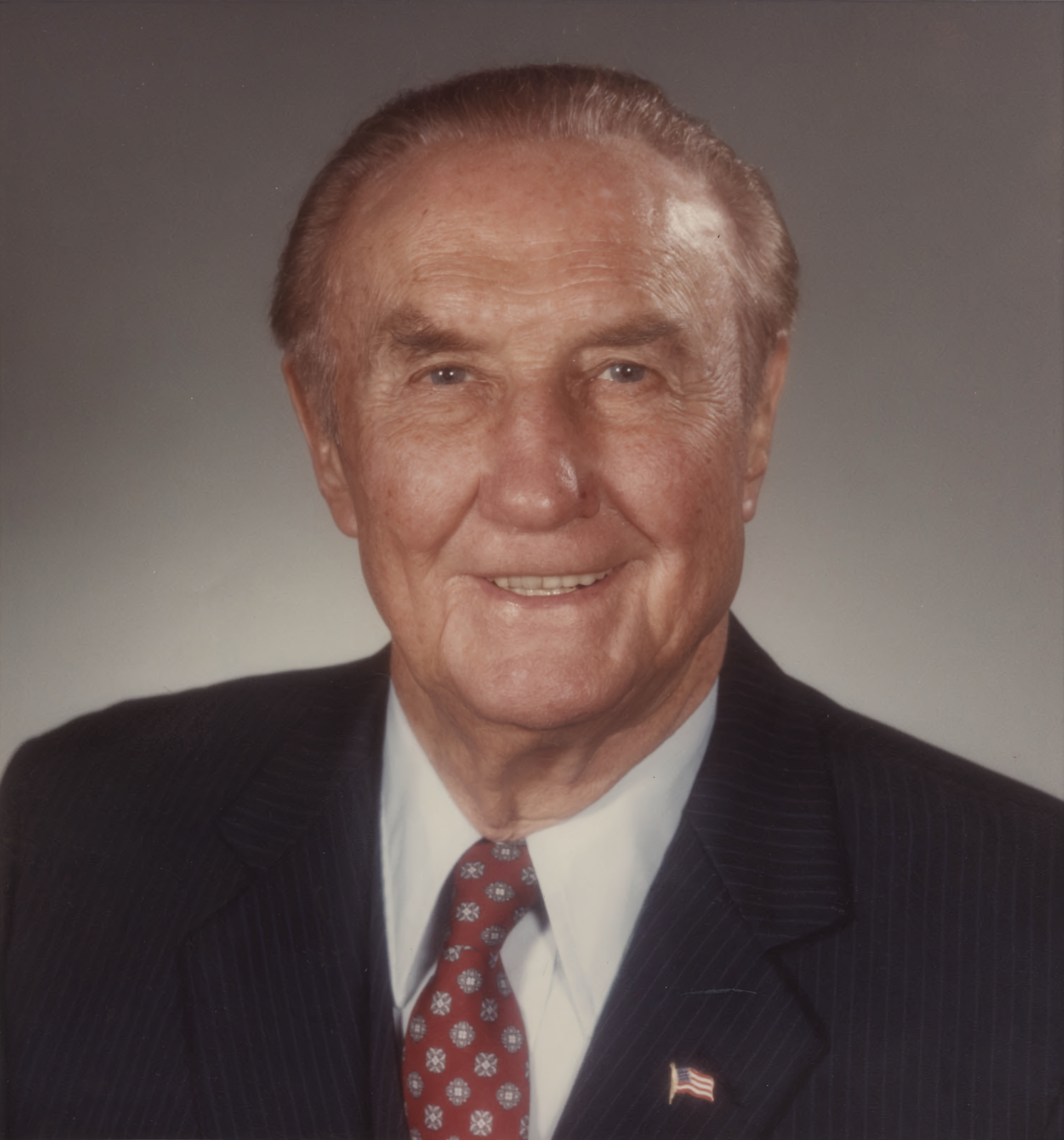

Nominee	Strom Thurmond	Bob Cunningham
Party	Republican	Democratic
Popular vote	482,032	244,112
Percentage	64.2%	32.5%
- County results Thurmond: 50–60% 60–70% 70–80% Cunningham: 50–60%
U.S. senator before election
Strom Thurmond
Republican
Elected U.S. Senator
Strom Thurmond
Republican

Popular incumbent Republican Strom Thurmond cruised to re-election against Democratic challenger and perennial candidate Bob Cunningham.

Senator Strom Thurmond faced no opposition from South Carolina Republicans and avoided a primary election. The state Democrats saw this as an unwinnable race so when Bob Cunningham sought the Democratic nomination, he was unopposed in his bid.

Cunningham launched his second bid to unseat Republican Sen. Strom Thurmond after switching from the GOP to the Democratic Party in early 1990. Though he faced a formidable opponent, Cunningham planned no fund-raising activities. "I don't plan to ask for anything and I won't accept any money from PACs", he said. Cunninghman said his campaign strategy was to "go to places where I was invited and spread out my ideas." If elected, Cummingham said he would push to limit consecutive congressional service to 12 years and reform the tax system. He supported greater environmental activism. "I think we're going at it in much too lukewarm a fashion. I think we should work hard to find a substitute for the internal combustion engine."

The election was never a serious contest. Thurmond overwhelmingly outspent Cunningham in his re-election campaign.

South Carolina U.S. Senate Election, 1990
Party	Candidate	Votes	%	±%
Republican	Strom Thurmond (Incumbent)	482,032	64.2%	−2.6%
Democratic	Bob Cunningham	244,112	32.5%	+0.7%
Libertarian	William H. Griffin	13,804	1.8%	+0.4%
American	Marion C. Metts	10,317	1.4%	+1.4%
No party	Write-Ins	464	0.1%	+0.1%
Majority		237,920	31.7%	−3.3%
Turnout		750,729	55.2%	−13.5%
Republican hold		Swing		

== South Dakota ==
South Dakota election
- November 6, 1990
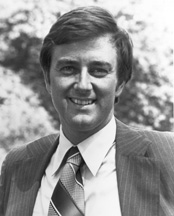

Nominee	Larry Pressler	Ted Muenster
Party	Republican	Democratic
Popular vote	135,682	116,727
Percentage	52.4%	45.1%
- County results Pressler: 40-50% 50-60% 60-70% 70-80% Muenster: 40–50% 50–60%

Incumbent Republican Larry Pressler won a narrow re-election battle against Democratic opponent Ted Muenster and Independent candidate Dean Sinclair, in contrast to his easy win in 1984.

South Dakota U.S. Senate Election, 1990
Party	Candidate	Votes	%	±%
Republican	Larry Pressler (Incumbent)	135,682	52.39%	−22.1%
Democratic	Theodore 'Ted' Muenster	116,727	45.07%	+19.56%
Independent	Dean L. Sinclair	6,567	2.54%	N/A
Majority		18,955	7.32%	−41.66%
Turnout		258,976	61.6%	−9.7%
Republican hold		Swing		

== Tennessee ==
Tennessee election
- November 6, 1990
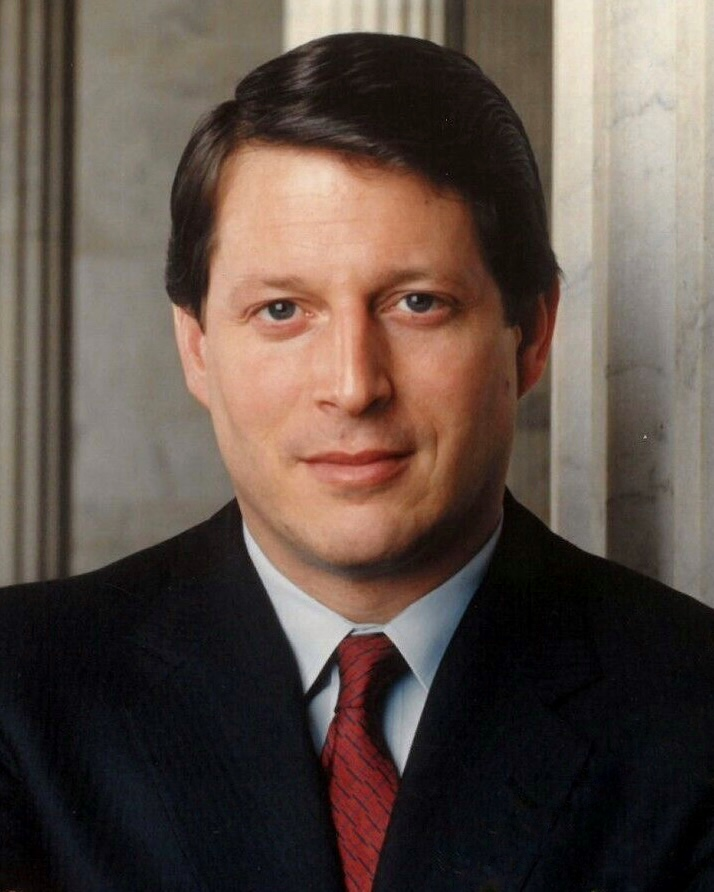

Nominee	Al Gore	William R. Hawkins
Party	Democratic	Republican
Popular vote	530,898	233,703
Percentage	67.73%	29.81%
- County results Gore: 50–60% 60–70% 70–80% 80–90%
U.S. senator before election
Al Gore
Democratic
Elected U.S. Senator
Al Gore
Democratic

Incumbent Democratic Senator Al Gore defeated Republican challenger William R. Hawkins, winning a second term. The election had a turnout rate of just over 20% of registered voters. Gore won in a landslide with over 67% of the vote improving on his 1984 margin, winning all of the state's counties.

1990 United States Senate election in Tennessee
Party	Candidate	Votes	%
Democratic	Al Gore (incumbent)	530,898	67.73%
Republican	William R. Hawkins	233,703	29.81%
Independent	Bill Jacox	11,172	1.43%
Independent	Charles Gordon Vick	7,995	1.02%
Write-in		109	0.01%
Total votes		783,877	100.00%
Democratic hold			

== Texas ==
Texas election
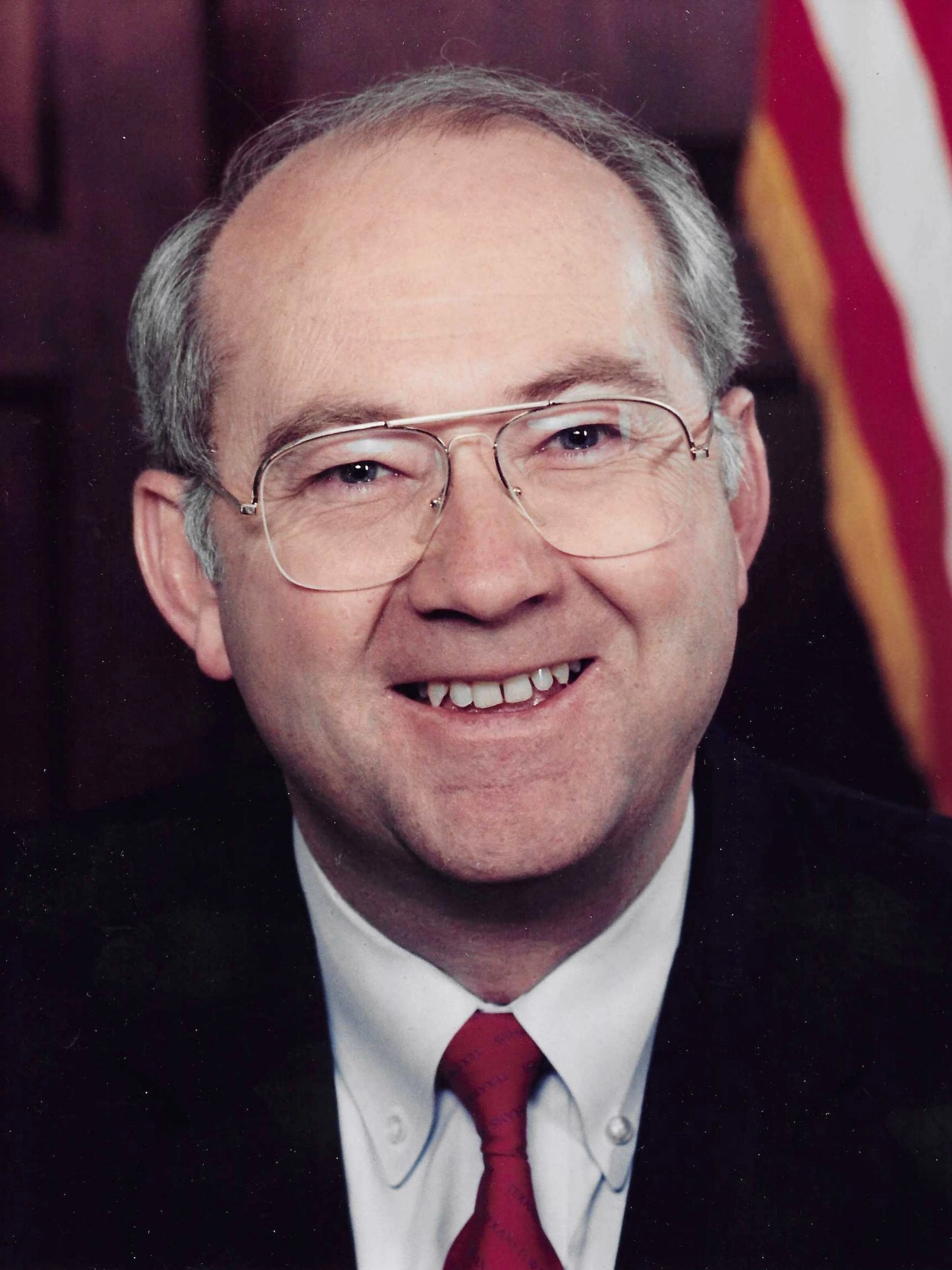

Nominee	Phil Gramm	Hugh Parmer
Party	Republican	Democratic
Popular vote	2,302,357	1,429,986
Percentage	60.2%	37.4%
- County results Gramm: 40–50% 50–60% 60–70% 70–80% 80–90% Parmer: 40–50% 50–60% 60–70% 70–80% Tie: 50–60%
U.S. senator before election
Phil Gramm
Republican
Elected U.S. Senator
Phil Gramm
Republican

Incumbent Republican Phil Gramm won re-election to a second term, beating Hugh Parmer, State Senator and former Mayor of Fort Worth

Gramm, a popular incumbent who switched parties a few years prior, had over $5 million on hand.

General election results
Party	Candidate	Votes	%
Republican	Phil Gramm (incumbent)	2,302,357	60.2%
Democratic	Hugh Parmer	1,429,986	37.4%
Libertarian	Gary Johnson	89,089	2.4%
Write In	Ira Calkins	725	0.0%
Total votes		3,822,157	100.00%
Majority		872,371	22.8%
Republican hold			

== Virginia ==
Virginia election
- Turnout: 25.5% (voting eligible)
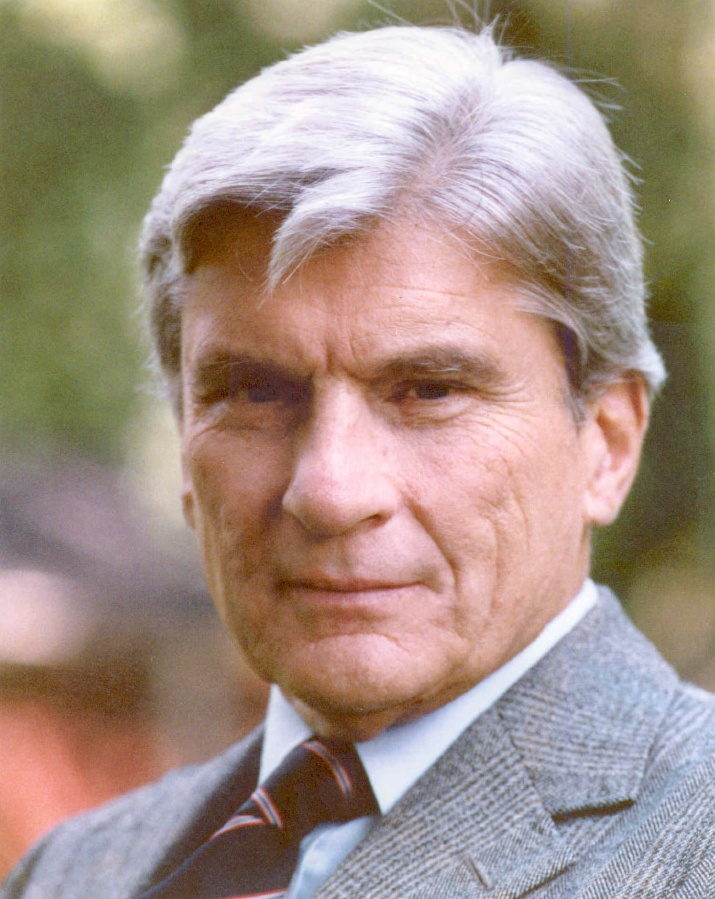

Nominee	John Warner	Nancy Spannaus
Party	Republican	Independent
Popular vote	876,782	196,755
Percentage	80.9%	18.2%
- County and independent city results Warner: 60–70% 70–80% 80–90% >90%
U.S. senator before election
John Warner
Republican
Elected U.S. Senator
John Warner
Republican

Incumbent Republican John W. Warner won re-election to a third term. No Democrat filed to run against him as he won every single county and city in the state with over 60% of the vote. Independent Nancy B. Spannaus (an affiliate of the controversial Lyndon LaRouche) got 18% of the vote, as she was the only other candidate on the ballot besides Warner.

1990 United States Senate election in Virginia
Party	Candidate	Votes	%	±%
Republican	John Warner (Incumbent)	876,782	80.91%	+10.86%
Independent	Nancy Spannaus	196,755	18.16%	
Write-ins		10,153	0.94%	+0.93%
Majority		680,027	62.75%	+22.65%
Turnout		1,083,690		
Republican hold		Swing		

== West Virginia ==
West Virginia election
- November 6, 1990
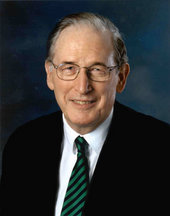

Nominee	Jay Rockefeller	John C. Yoder
Party	Democratic	Republican
Popular vote	276,234	128,071
Percentage	68.32%	31.68%
- County results Rockefeller: 50–60% 60–70% 70–80% 80–90% Yoder: 50–60%
U.S. senator before election
Jay Rockefeller
Democratic
Elected U.S. Senator
Jay Rockefeller
Democratic

The 1990 United States Senate election in West Virginia was held November 6, 1990. Incumbent Democratic U.S. Senator Jay Rockefeller won re-election to a second term.

General election results
Party	Candidate	Votes	%	±%
Democratic	Jay Rockefeller (Incumbent)	276,234	68.32%	+16.50%
Republican	John C. Yoder	128,071	31.68%	−16.05%
Majority		148,163	36.64%	+32.55%
Turnout		404,305	≈35%	
Democratic hold		Swing		

== Wyoming ==
Wyoming election
- November 6, 1990
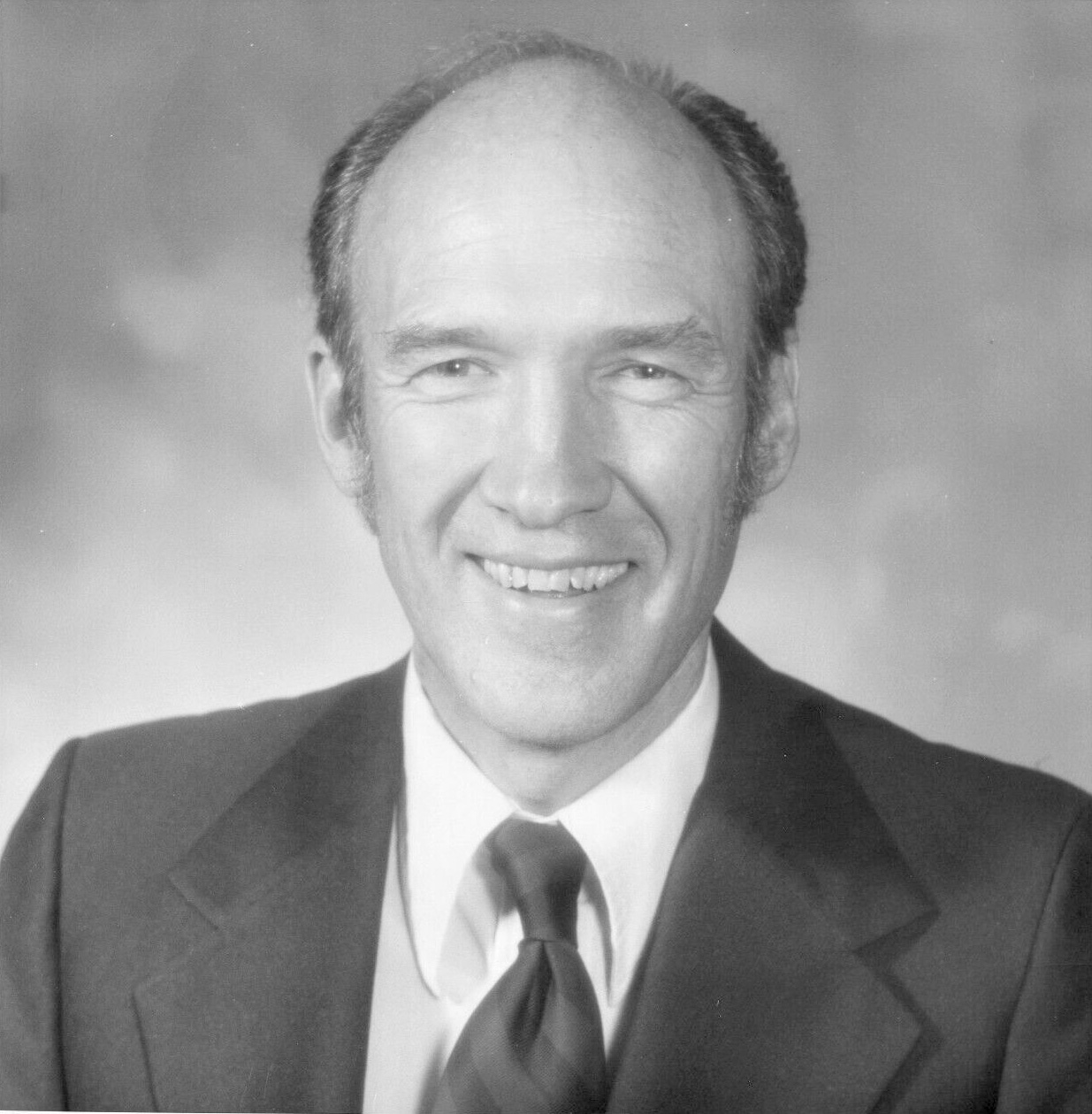

Nominee	Alan K. Simpson	Kathy Helling
Party	Republican	Democratic
Popular vote	100,784	56,848
Percentage	63.94%	36.06%
- County Results; Simpson: 50-60% 60-70% 70-80%
U.S. senator before election
Alan K. Simpson
Republican
Elected U.S. Senator
Alan K. Simpson
Republican

Incumbent Republican Alan Simpson easily won re-election to a third term over Democratic challenger Kathy Helling.

1990 United States Senate election in Wyoming
Party	Candidate	Votes	%	±%
Republican	Alan Simpson (Incumbent)	100,784	63.94%	
Democratic	Kathy Helling	56,848	36.06%	
Majority		43,936	27.88%	
Turnout		157,632		
Republican hold		Swing		

== See also ==
- 1990 United States elections
  - 1990 United States gubernatorial elections
  - 1990 United States House of Representatives elections
- 101st United States Congress
- 102nd United States Congress

== Bibliography ==
- Dennis, Virginia M. (January 16, 1985). State of Delaware: Official Results of General Election 1984 (PDF). Delaware Department of Elections.
- Harper, Richard B. (March 27, 1991). State of Delaware: Official Results of General Election 1990 (PDF). Delaware Department of Elections.
- State Election Commission (1991). South Carolina Election Commission Annual Report 1990-1991. Columbia, South Carolina: The Commission. p. 91.
