= 2014 United States Senate election in Rhode Island =

- November 4, 2014
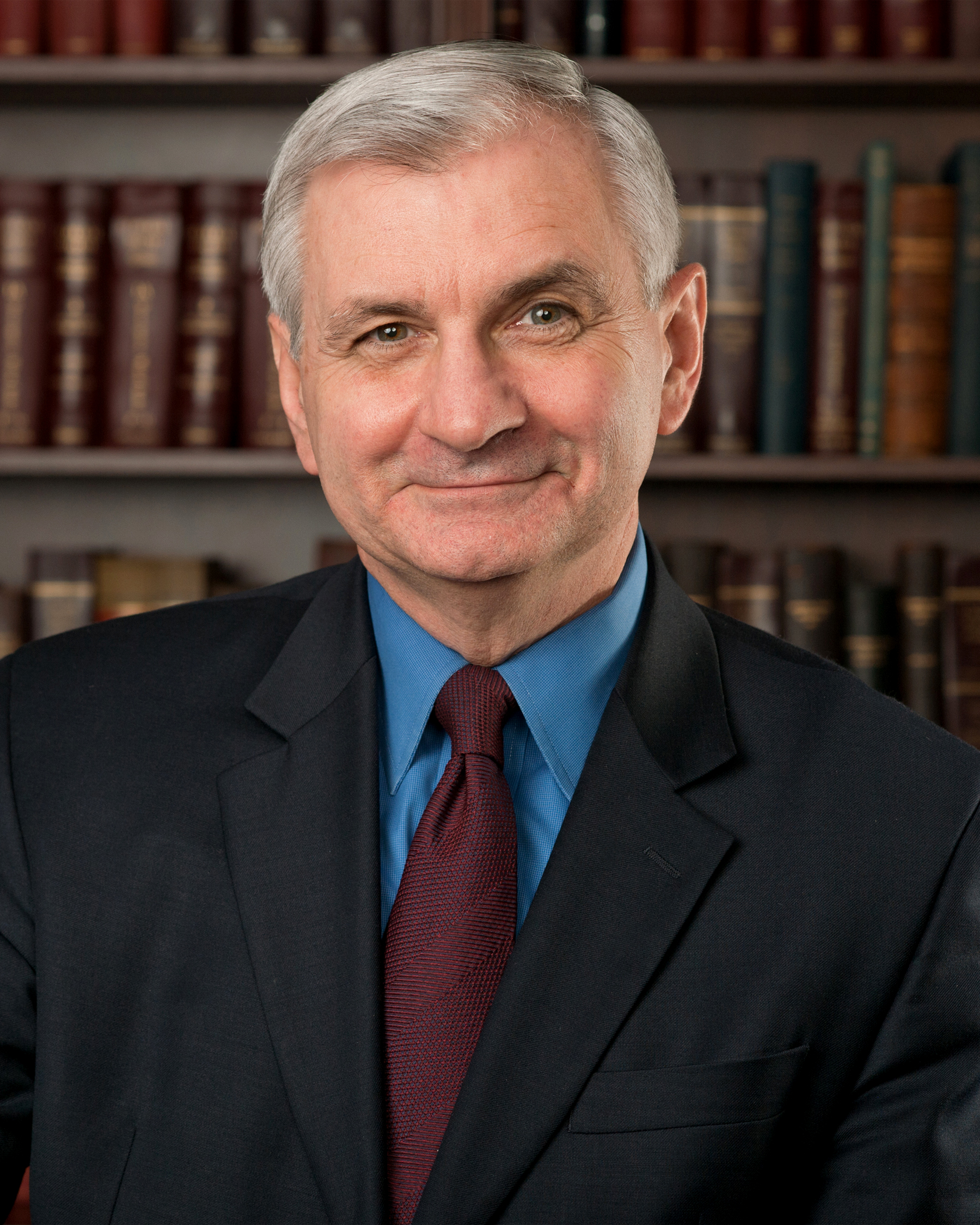

Nominee	Jack Reed	Mark Zaccaria
Party	Democratic	Republican
Popular vote	223,675	92,684
Percentage	70.58%	29.25%
- Reed: 50–60% 60–70% 70–80% 80–90%
U.S. senator before election
Jack Reed
Democratic
Elected U.S. Senator
Jack Reed
Democratic

The 2014 United States Senate election in Rhode Island was held on November 4, 2014, to elect a member of the United States Senate from the State of Rhode Island, concurrently with the election of the governor of Rhode Island, as well as other elections to the United States Senate in other states and elections to the United States House of Representatives and various state and local elections.

Incumbent Democratic senator Jack Reed ran for and won reelection to a fourth term in office. Reed won a higher share of the overall vote in his state than any other Democratic Senate candidate or incumbent Democratic United States Senator during the 2014 elections. On the same day that Reed won a fourth term in the United States Senate with more than 70 percent of the vote, national Democrats lost nine seats in the concurrent U.S. Senate elections, thereby costing them control of the chamber.

== Background ==
Then-U.S. Representative Jack Reed was first elected to the U.S. Senate in 1996 to succeed retiring Democratic incumbent Claiborne Pell, the longest-serving senator in Rhode Island's history. Reed defeated Treasurer of Rhode Island Nancy Mayer in a landslide and was re-elected by even larger majorities against casino pit manager Robert Tingle in 2002 and 2008.

Rhode Island has elected U.S. Senators into the majority party of the subsequent Congress more than any other state in the nation over the last 100 years at 77 percent of the time.

== Democratic primary ==
=== Candidates ===
==== Declared ====
- Jack Reed, incumbent U.S. Senator

=== Primary results ===
Democratic primary results
Party	Candidate	Votes	%
Democratic	Jack Reed (incumbent)	98,610	100.00%

== Republican primary ==
=== Candidates ===
==== Declared ====
- Mark Zaccaria, former chairman of the Rhode Island Republican Party, former North Kingstown town councilman and nominee for RI-02 in 2008 and 2010

==== Withdrew ====
- Raymond McKay, City of Warwick network administrator, president of the Rhode Island Republican Assembly and nominee for the state senate in 1998
- Kara Young, conservative activist and perennial candidate

==== Declined ====
- Scott Avedisian, Mayor of Warwick
- Brendan Doherty, former superintendent of the Rhode Island State Police and nominee for Rhode Island's 1st congressional district in 2012
- Allan Fung, Mayor of Cranston (running for Governor)

=== Primary results ===
Republican primary results
Party	Candidate	Votes	%
Republican	Mark Zaccaria	23,780	100.00%

== General election ==
=== Predictions ===
Source	Ranking	As of
The Cook Political Report	Solid D	November 3, 2014
Sabato's Crystal Ball	Safe D	November 3, 2014
Rothenberg Political Report	Safe D	November 3, 2014
Real Clear Politics	Safe D	November 3, 2014

=== Polling ===
Poll source	Date(s) administered	Sample size	Margin of error	Jack Reed (D)	Mark Zaccaria (R)	Other	Undecided
CBS News/NYT/YouGov	July 5–24, 2014	922	± 3.4%	63%	—	12%	25%
CBS News/NYT/YouGov	August 18 – September 2, 2014	764	± 4%	52%	32%	1%	15%
Rasmussen Reports	September 23–25, 2014	750	± 4%	61%	26%	0%	13%
CBS News/NYT/YouGov	September 20 – October 1, 2014	724	± 4%	64%	22%	0%	14%
CBS News/NYT/YouGov	October 16–23, 2014	866	± 6%	65%	20%	0%	15%

Hypothetical polling

Poll source	Date(s) administered	Sample size	Margin of error	Jack Reed (D)	Scott Avedisian (R)	Undecided
Public Policy Polling	January 28–30, 2013	614	± 4%	60%	30%	10%

Poll source	Date(s) administered	Sample size	Margin of error	Jack Reed (D)	Donald Carcieri (R)	Undecided
Public Policy Polling	January 28–30, 2013	614	± 4%	66%	25%	9%

Poll source	Date(s) administered	Sample size	Margin of error	Jack Reed (D)	Brendan Doherty (R)	Undecided
Public Policy Polling	January 28–30, 2013	614	± 4%	63%	34%	3%

Poll source	Date(s) administered	Sample size	Margin of error	Jack Reed (D)	Allan Fung (R)	Undecided
Public Policy Polling	January 28–30, 2013	614	± 4%	63%	29%	8%

Poll source	Date(s) administered	Sample size	Margin of error	Jack Reed (D)	Curt Schilling (R)	Undecided
Public Policy Polling	January 28–30, 2013	614	± 4%	75%	10%	16%

=== Results ===

United States Senate election in Rhode Island, 2014
Party	Candidate	Votes	%	±%
Democratic	Jack Reed (incumbent)	223,675	70.58%	−2.82%
Republican	Mark Zaccaria	92,684	29.25%	+2.65%
Write-in		539	0.17%	N/A
Total votes		316,898	100%	N/A
Democratic hold				

==== By county ====
	Jack Reed Democratic		Mark Zaccaria Republican		Others	
County	Votes	%	Votes	%	Votes	%
Bristol	12,856	72.1%	4,940	27.7%	29	0.2%
Kent	38,320	66.0%	19,663	33.9%	80	0.1%
Newport	20,532	70.7%	8,472	29.2%	33	0.1%
Providence	121,097	73.3%	43,866	26.5%	531	0.2%
Washington	30,849	66.1%	15,742	33.7%	66	0.1%

== See also ==
- 2014 United States Senate elections
- 2014 United States elections
- 2014 United States House of Representatives elections in Rhode Island
- 2014 Rhode Island gubernatorial election
