= East Side Trolley Tunnel =

American mass transit tunnel

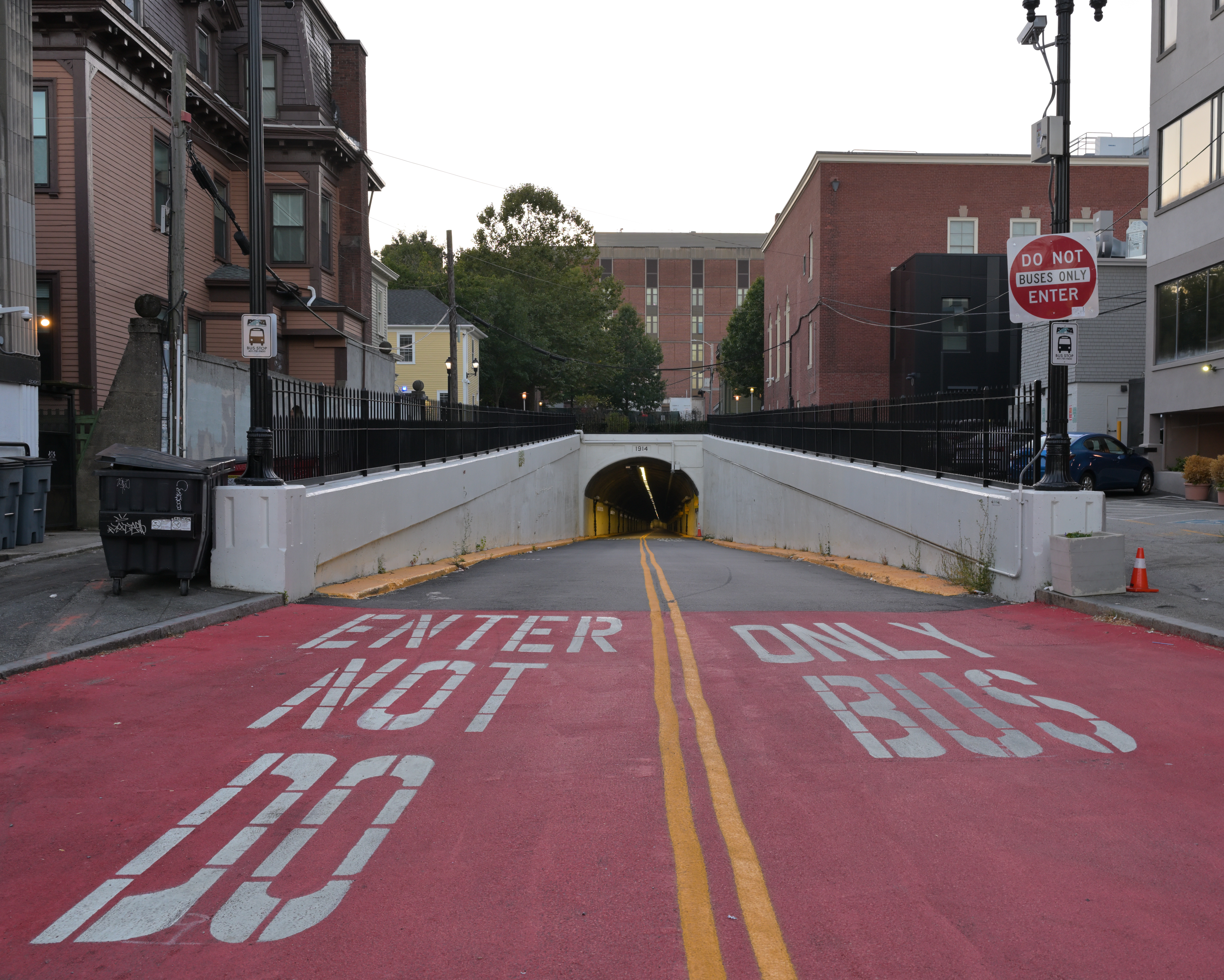
- The east portal of the tunnel opens onto Thayer Street, with Brown University buildings visible in the background (2025)

Overview
- Other names: East Side Transit Tunnel, College Hill Tunnel
- Location: Providence, Rhode Island, US
- Start: Thayer Street (41°49′39.2″N 71°24′06.2″W)
- End: North Main Street (41°49′37.0″N 71°24′29.5″W)

Operation
- Opened: 1914
- Rebuilt: 1948

Technical
- Length: 2,160 feet (660 m)

Route map
- East Side Trolley Tunnel (Providence)

The East Side Trolley Tunnel, also known as the East Side Transit Tunnel or the College Hill Tunnel, is a bi-directional tunnel in Providence, Rhode Island, United States, originally built for trolley use in 1914, and now used for public transit buses. The East Side Trolley Tunnel could be considered the first bus rapid transit link in North America, because of its exclusive and continuous bus use since 1948.

== Description ==
The tunnel runs for 2,160 feet (660 m) under College Hill on Providence's East Side, with its east portal at Thayer Street, the busy commercial district near Brown University, leading to its west portal at North Main Street near the Rhode Island School of Design. It provides a gentler 4% to 5% grade compared to the steeper 10% grade of the city streets above it, while also allowing public-transit vehicles to bypass traffic and stoplights. The tunnel traverses a 100-foot (30 m) drop in elevation from its east portal to its west portal.

The tunnel is reserved exclusively for buses—currently the RIPTA routes 1, 32, 33, 34, 40, 49, and 61. Police and Fire Department vehicles also may make use of the tunnel. The facility carries around 4,500 riders daily (almost 10% of RIPTA ridership), via approximately 1,680 buses per week. The Thayer Street stop is the 6th-busiest of the 4,000 stops in the statewide RIPTA system. The tunnel allows faster transit access from College Hill to Downtown Providence and the RIPTA transit hub at Kennedy Plaza.

Despite signs explicitly forbidding trespassing or use of skateboards in the tunnel, fast skateboarding through the tunnel is fairly common.

== History ==
Prior to the construction of the Trolley Tunnel, the steepness of the streets climbing College Hill led to the 1888 construction of a cable-car line by the Providence Cable Tramway Company, the only such system ever to be built in New England.

The west portal of the tunnel was built directly under the Waterman Building (1893), the original classroom and museum gallery structure of the Rhode Island School of Design. Extensive and complex construction methods were required to support the building as the tunnel was bored underneath it.

In 1948 the tracks were removed, and the tunnel was paved for use by buses and trackless trolleys. The tunnel was used by two trackless trolley routes, Elmgrove Avenue and Hope Street, from fall 1948 to fall 1953. The trackless trolley system in Providence was dismantled in the mid-1950s, the last route closing on June 24, 1955.

In 2018, US Senator Jack Reed (RI-D) toured the tunnel with RIPTA officials, and announced a $903,000 federal grant for planning repairs and improvements to the heavily-used transit structure. As of 2022, planning was in process for construction related to the tunnel.

== Gallery ==
The Waterman Building (1893) of the Rhode Island School of Design is visible directly above the west portal openings.

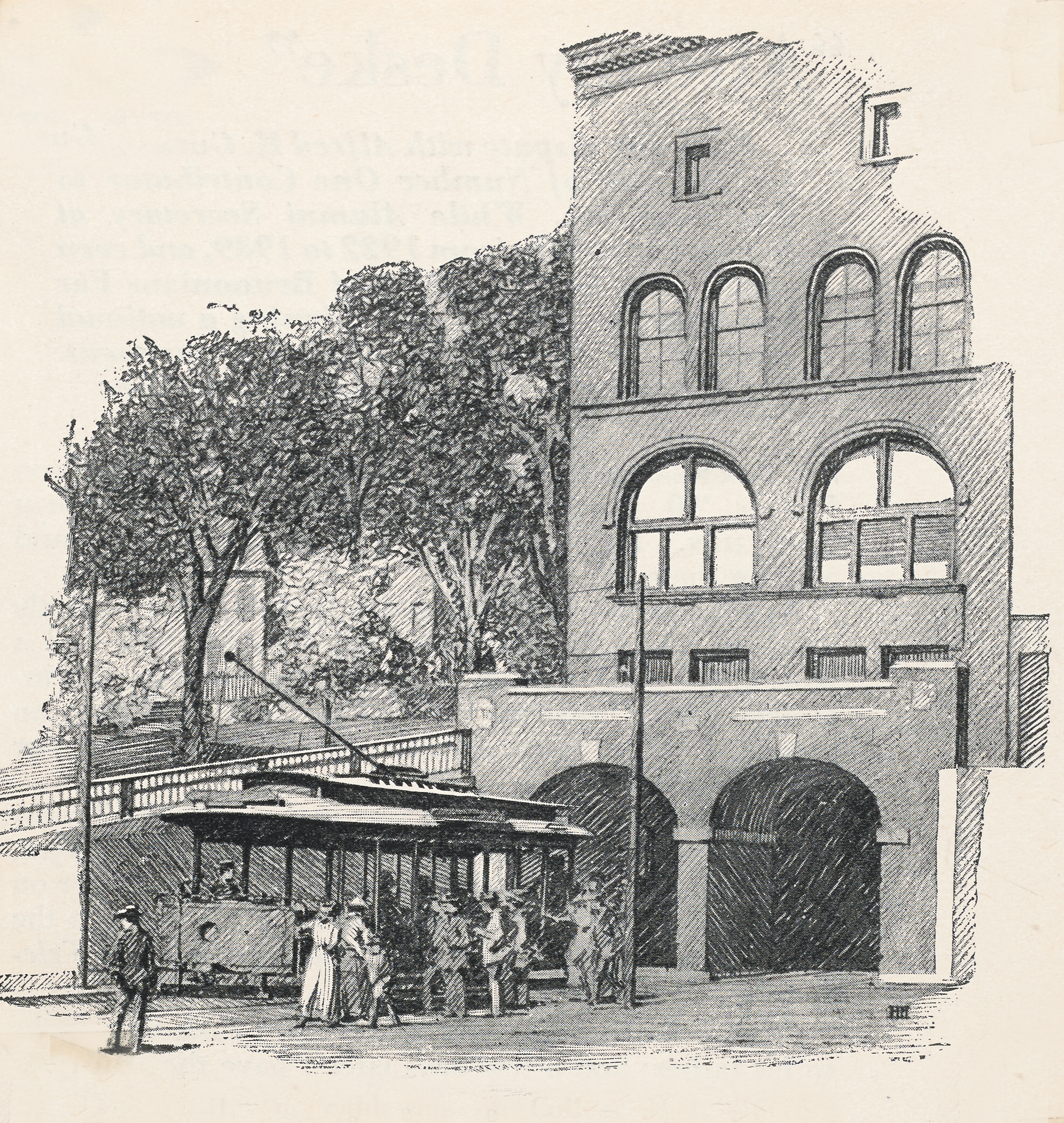
Illustration of the west portal (c.1914)

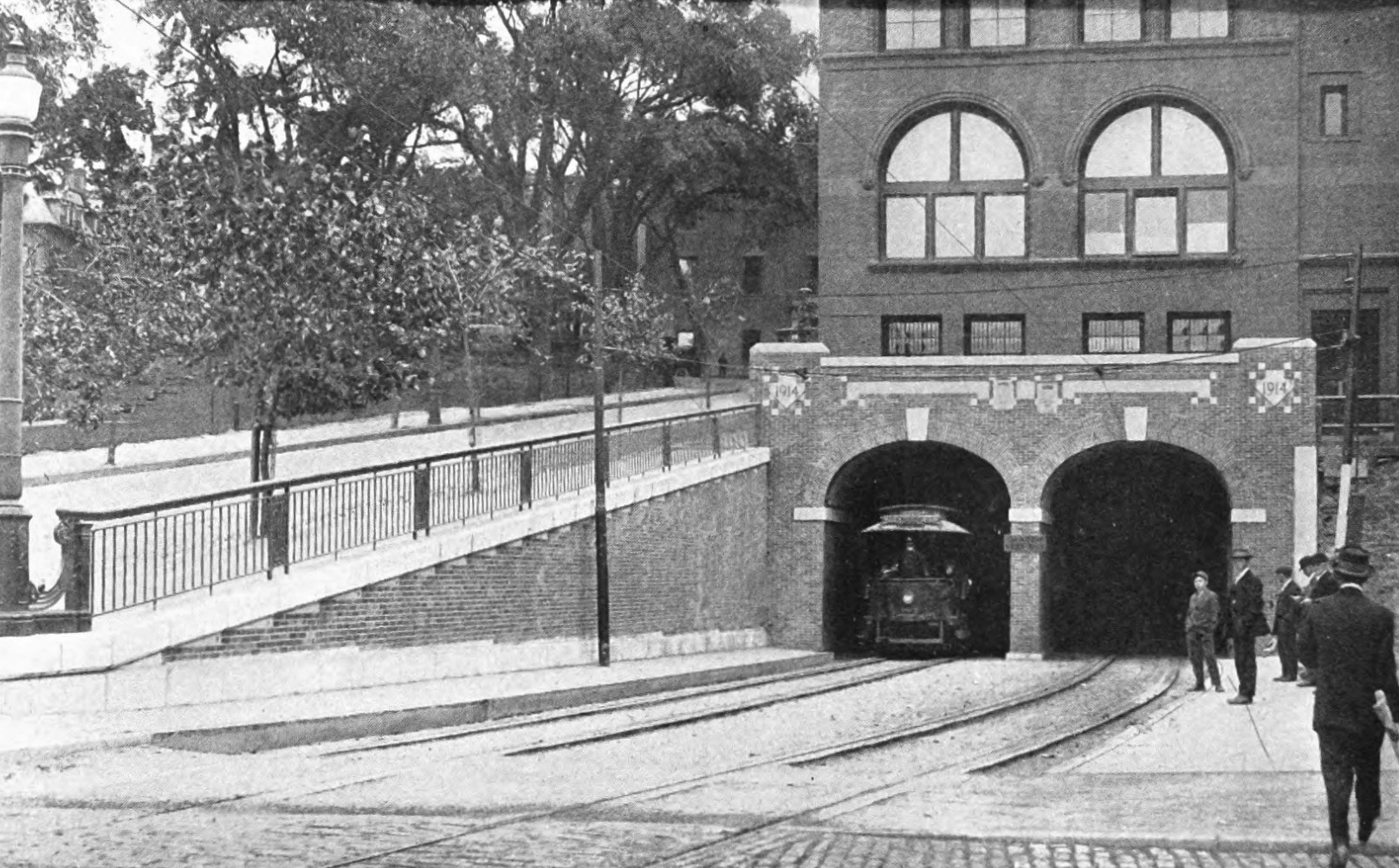
Newly-opened west portal (1915)

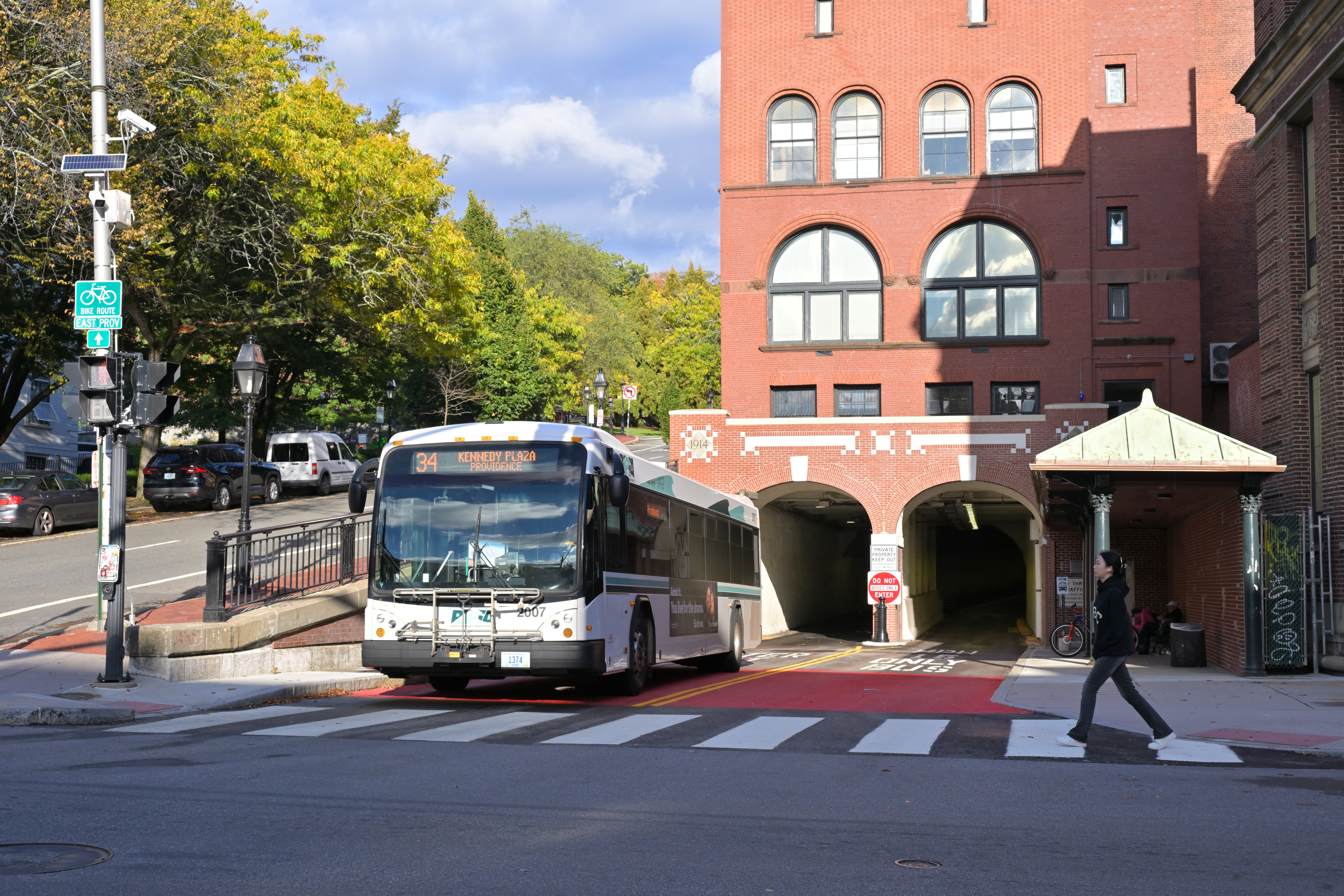
A bus emerges from the west portal in 2025.

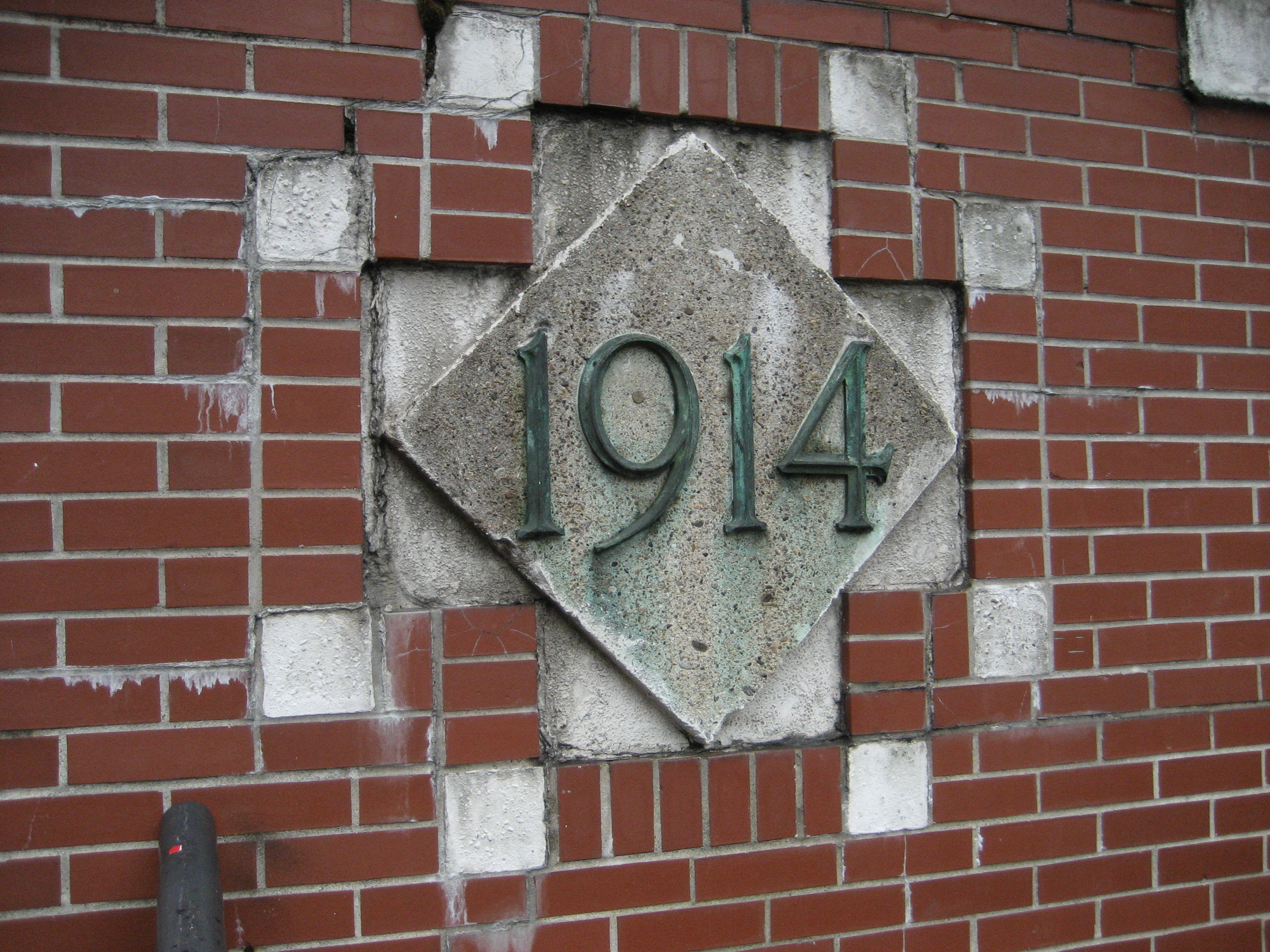
Tile on the tunnel's west portal marks year of opening
