= 2008 United States House of Representatives elections in Rhode Island =

- November 4, 2008

Both Rhode Island seats to the United States House of Representatives
	Majority party	Minority party
Party	Democratic	Republican
Last election	2	0
Seats won	2	0
Seat change	Steady	Steady
Popular vote	303,670	118,773
Percentage	69.29%	27.10%
Swing	▼1.71%	▲15.89%

Democratic
50–60%
60–70%
70–80%
80–90%

The 2008 congressional elections in Rhode Island were held on November 4, 2008 to determine who will represent Rhode Island in the United States House of Representatives, coinciding with the presidential and senatorial elections. Representatives are elected for two-year terms; those elected will serve in the 111th Congress from January 3, 2009 until January 3, 2011.

Rhode Island has two seats in the House, apportioned according to the 2000 United States census. Its 2007-2008 congressional delegation consisted of two Democrats, both of whom were re-elected in 2008.

== Overview ==
United States House of Representatives elections in Rhode Island, 2006
Party	Votes	Percentage	Seats	+/–
Democratic	303,670	69.29%	2	—
Republican	118,773	27.10%	0	—
Independents	15,789	3.60%	0	—
Totals	438,232	100.00%	2	—

== District 1 ==
2008 Rhode Island's 1st congressional district election
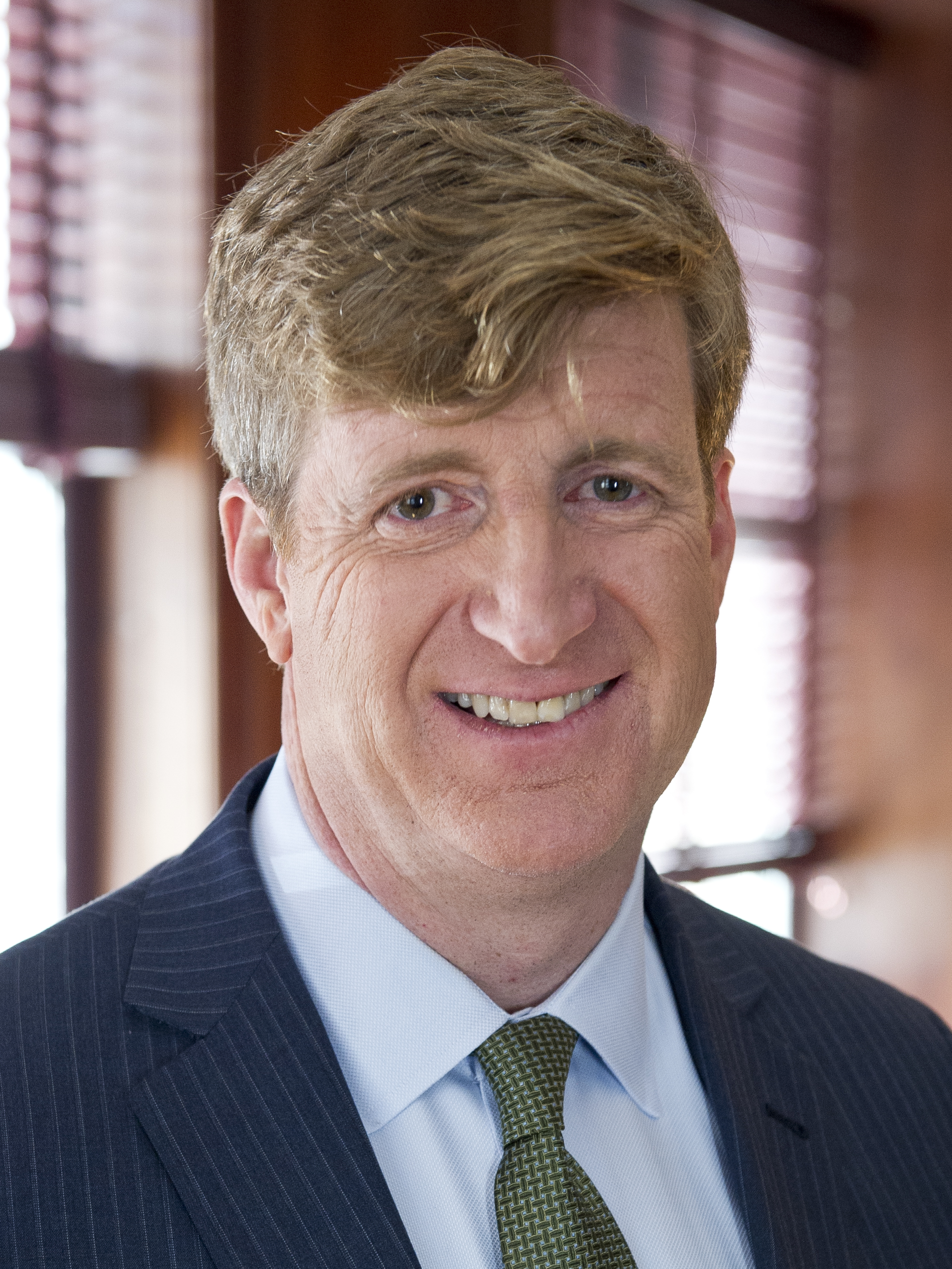

Nominee	Patrick J. Kennedy	Jonathon P. Scott	Kenneth A. Capalbo
Party	Democratic	Republican	Independent
Popular vote	145,254	51,340	15,108
Percentage	68.5%	24.2%	7.1%
- County results Kennedy: 60–70% 70–80%
U.S. Representative before election
Patrick J. Kennedy
Democratic
Elected U.S. Representative
Patrick J. Kennedy
Democratic

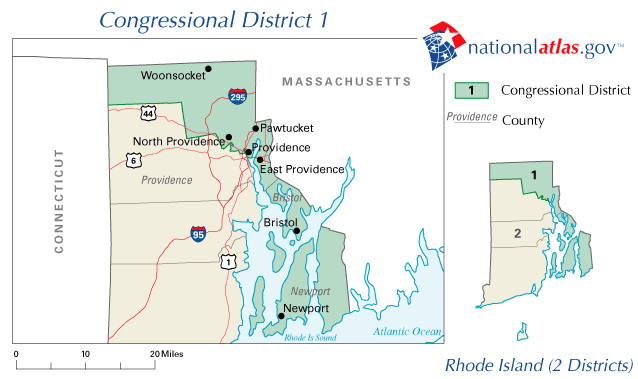

This district covers the northern and East Bay sections of the state. Democratic incumbent Patrick J. Kennedy, who has represented this seat since 1995, won against Republican nominee Jonathan Scott.

=== Predictions ===
Source	Ranking	As of
The Cook Political Report	Safe D	November 6, 2008
Rothenberg	Safe D	November 2, 2008
Sabato's Crystal Ball	Safe D	November 6, 2008
Real Clear Politics	Safe D	November 7, 2008
CQ Politics	Safe D	November 6, 2008

Rhode Islands's 1st congressional district election, 2008
Party	Candidate	Votes	%
Democratic	Patrick J. Kennedy (incumbent)	145,254	68.52
Republican	Jonathon P. Scott	51,340	24.22
Independent	Kenneth A. Capalbo	15,108	7.13
Write-ins		296	0.14
Total votes		211,998	100.00
Democratic hold			

== District 2 ==
2008 Rhode Island's 2nd congressional district election
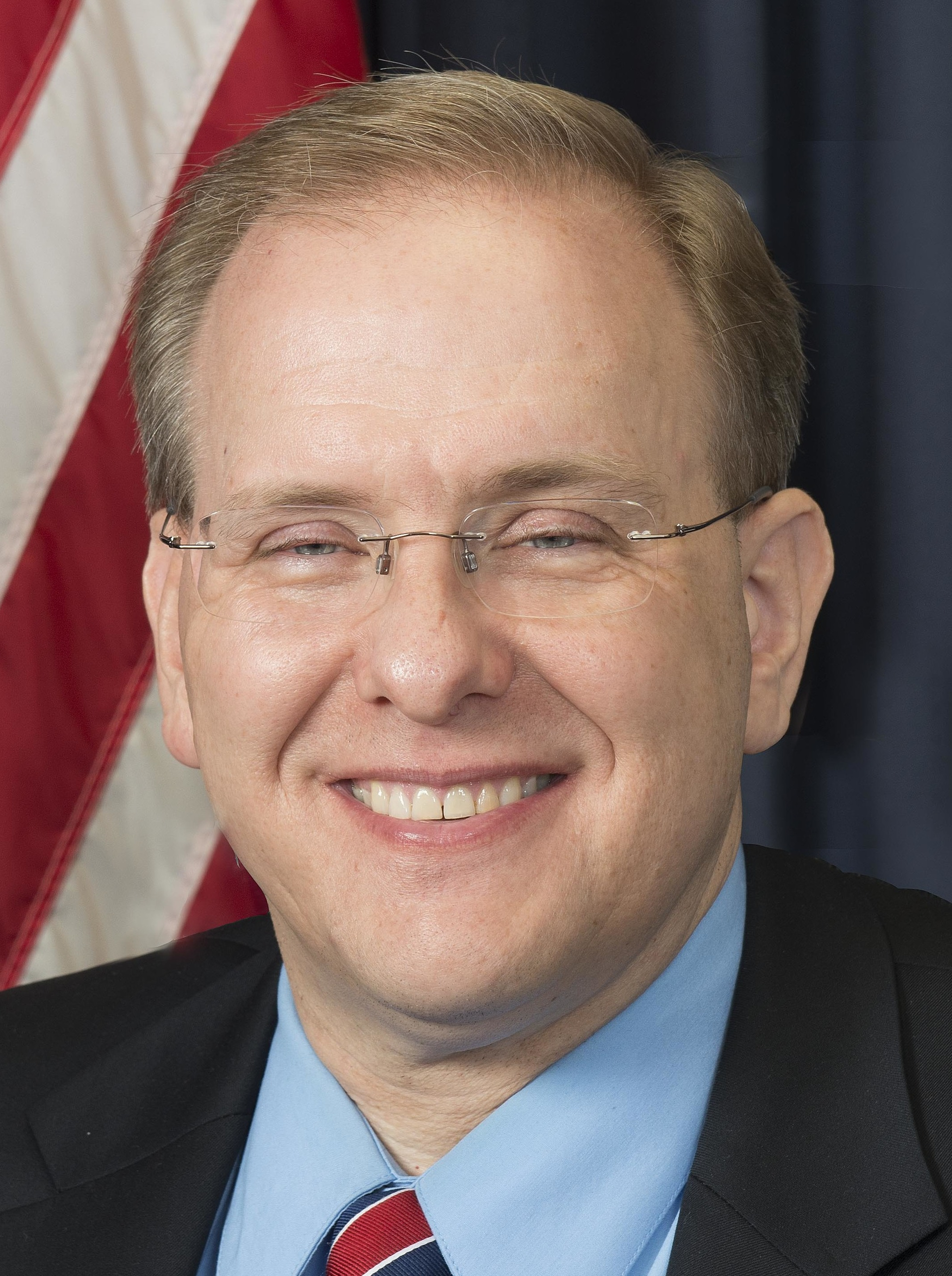

Nominee	James Langevin	Mark Zaccaria
Party	Democratic	Republican
Popular vote	158,416	67,433
Percentage	70.0%	29.8%
- County results Langevin: 60–70% 70–80%
U.S. Representative before election
James Langevin
Democratic
Elected U.S. Representative
James Langevin
Democratic

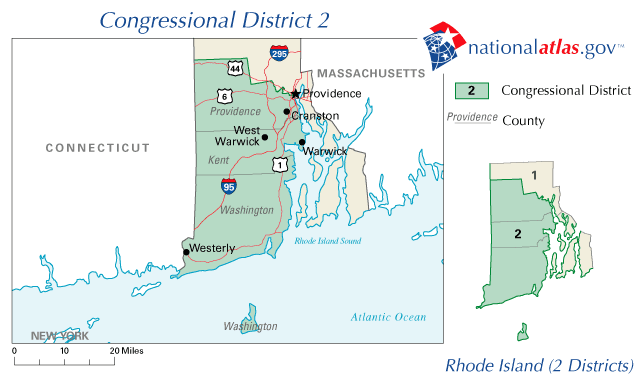

This district covers the areas roughly south and west of Providence. Democratic incumbent Jim Langevin, who has represented this seat since 2001, won against Republican nominee Mark Zaccaria.

=== Predictions ===
Source	Ranking	As of
The Cook Political Report	Safe D	November 6, 2008
Rothenberg	Safe D	November 2, 2008
Sabato's Crystal Ball	Safe D	November 6, 2008
Real Clear Politics	Safe D	November 7, 2008
CQ Politics	Safe D	November 6, 2008

Rhode Island's 2nd congressional district election, 2010
Party	Candidate	Votes	%
Democratic	James Langevin (incumbent)	158,416	70.02
Republican	Mark Zaccaria	67,433	29.81
Write-ins		385	0.17
Total votes		226,234	100.00
Democratic hold			

Preceded by 2006 elections	United States House of Representatives elections in Rhode Island; 2008	Succeeded by 2010 elections
