= Rhode Island Center for Freedom and Prosperity =

American think tank

- Abbreviation: RICFP
- Formation: 2011
- Founded at: Providence, Rhode Island
- Type: Nonprofit 501(c)(3)
- Methods: Public policy research
- President: Mike Stenhouse
- Revenue: $150,000 (2024)
- Expenses: $230,000 (2024)
- Website: rifreedom.org

The Rhode Island Center for Freedom and Prosperity (RICFP) is a public policy think tank located in Rhode Island that seeks to advance free market ideas. According to the organization, it "is dedicated to providing concerned citizens, the media, and public officials with empirical research data, while also advancing free-market solutions to public policy issues in the state."

RICFP is headed by former major league baseball player Mike Stenhouse. Stenhouse formerly ran the Ocean State Policy Research Institute, a Rhode Island think tank that ceased operations in 2011.

The organization is active in policy areas including tax policy, business climate, health care, pension reform and job growth. In June 2012, the organization issued a report arguing that Rhode Island should eliminate its 7-percent tax to stimulate the state's struggling economy. RICFP later worked with Democratic state legislator Jan Malik on tax reduction proposals in the Rhode Island Legislature. The organization publishes government transparency data, including municipal and school district spending as well as public employee compensation. The Ocean State Current is the organization's "media arm".

== See also ==
- State Policy Network
