= Ocean State Policy Research Institute =

American think tank

Ocean State Policy Research Institute (OSPRI) was a free market-oriented, Rhode Island–based think tank that was active from July 2007 until July 2011. The group's stated mission was to "craft sound public policy based on the principles of free enterprise, limited government, and traditional American values". OSPRI's CEO was former major league baseball player Mike Stenhouse. After OSPRI was dissolved, Stenhouse and several members of OSPRI's board of directors went on to found another think tank, the Rhode Island Center for Freedom and Prosperity.
