= 2006 United States House of Representatives elections in Rhode Island =

- November 7, 2006

Both Rhode Island seats to the United States House of Representatives
	Majority party	Minority party
Party	Democratic	Republican
Last election	2	0
Seats won	2	0
Seat change	Steady	Steady
Popular vote	264,949	41,836
Percentage	71.00%	11.21%

Democratic
60–70%
70–80%

The 2006 United States House of Representatives elections in Rhode Island were held on November 7, 2006, to determine who will represent the state of Rhode Island in the United States House of Representatives. Rhode Island has two seats in the House, apportioned according to the 2000 United States census. Representatives are elected for two-year terms.

== Overview ==
United States House of Representatives elections in Rhode Island, 2006
Party	Votes	Percentage	Seats	+/–
Democratic	264,949	71.00%	2	—
Independents	66,363	17.78%	0	—
Republican	41,836	11.21%	0	—
Totals	373,148	100.00%	2	—

== District 1 ==
2006 Rhode Island's 1st congressional district election
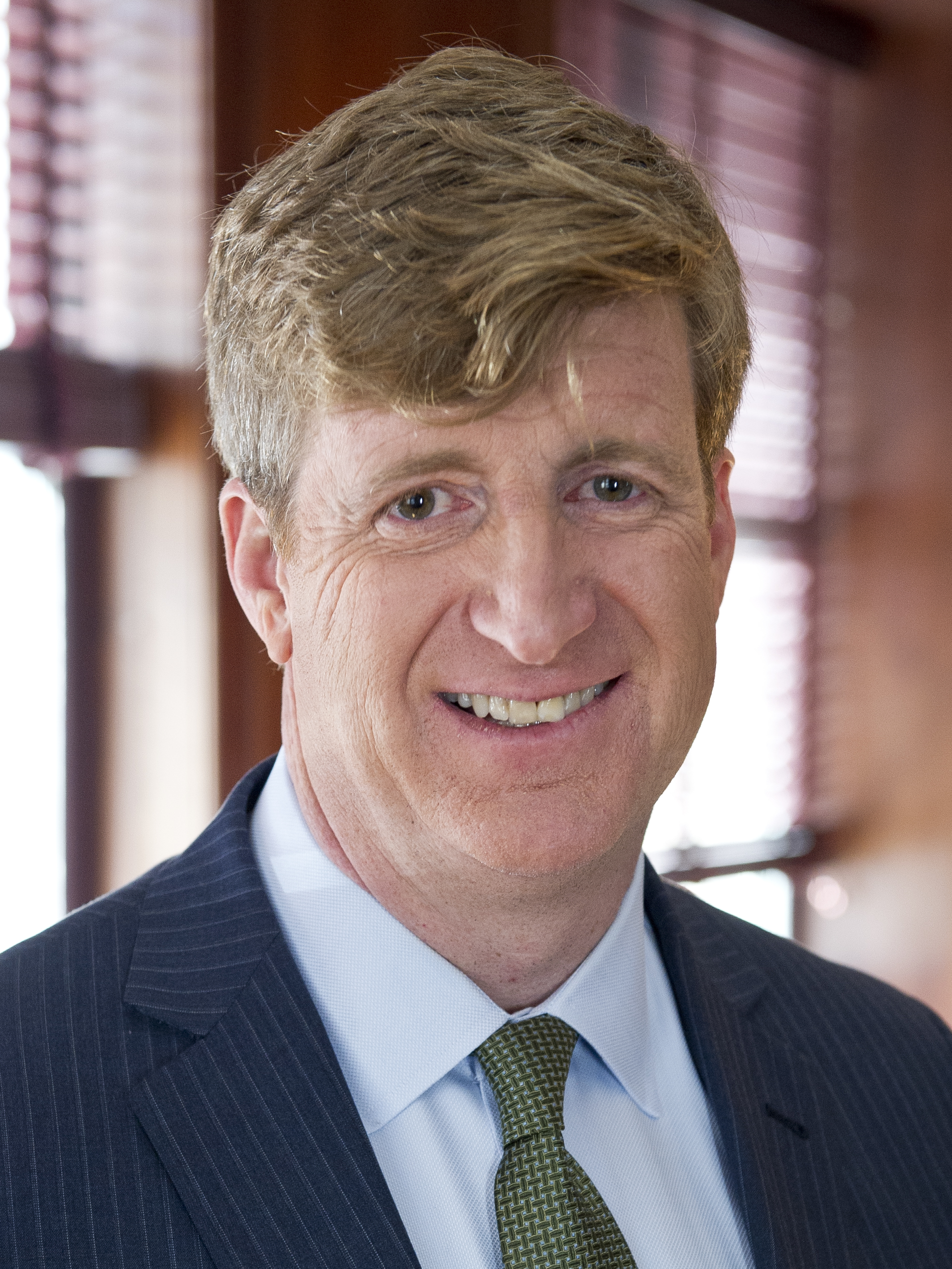

Nominee	Patrick J. Kennedy	Jonathon P. Scott	Kenneth A. Capalbo
Party	Democratic	Republican	Independent
Popular vote	124,634	41,836	13,634
Percentage	69.2%	23.2%	7.6%
- County results Kennedy: 60–70% 70–80%
U.S. Representative before election
Patrick J. Kennedy (inc.)
Democratic
Elected U.S. Representative
Patrick J. Kennedy
Democratic

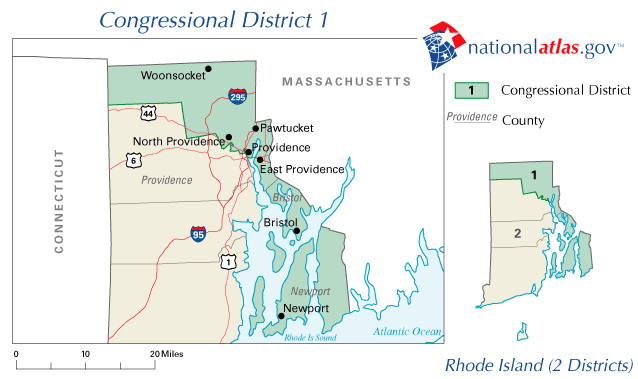

Incumbent Democrat Patrick J. Kennedy defeated Republican Jon Scott, a member of the Ocean State Policy Research Institute. This district covers the northern part of the state.

=== Predictions ===
Source	Ranking	As of
The Cook Political Report	Safe D	November 6, 2006
Rothenberg	Safe D	November 6, 2006
Sabato's Crystal Ball	Safe D	November 6, 2006
Real Clear Politics	Safe D	November 7, 2006
CQ Politics	Safe D	November 7, 2006

Rhode Islands's 1st congressional district election, 2006
Party	Candidate	Votes	%
Democratic	Patrick J. Kennedy (inc.)	124,634	69.20
Republican	Jonathon P. Scott	41,836	23.23
Independent	Kenneth A. Capalbo	13,634	7.57
Total votes		180,104	100.00
Democratic hold			

== District 2 ==
2006 Rhode Island's 2nd congressional district election
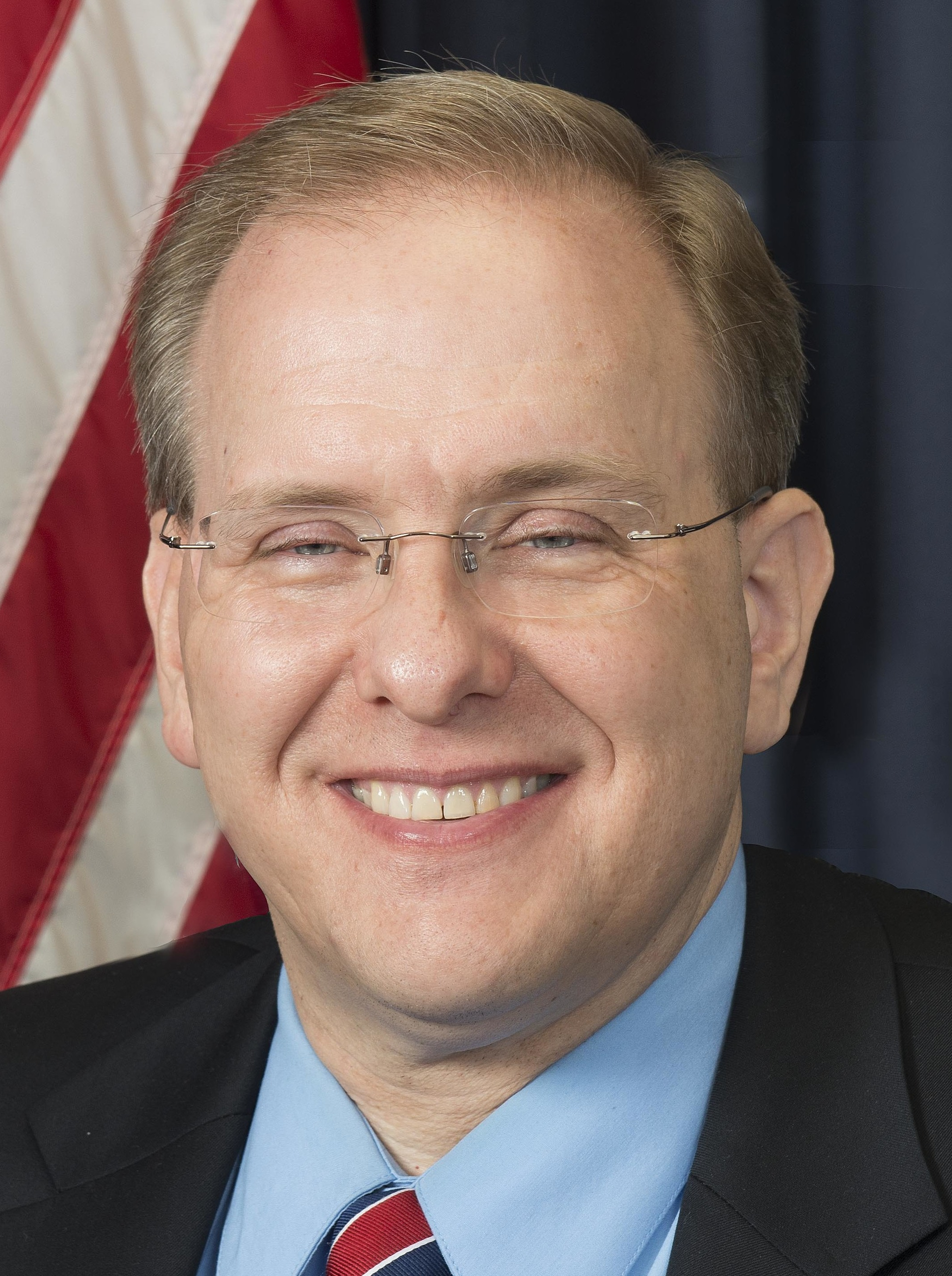

Nominee	James Langevin	Rod Driver
Party	Democratic	Independent
Popular vote	140,315	52,729
Percentage	72.7%	27.3%
- County results Langevin: 60–70% 70–80%
U.S. Representative before election
James Langevin (inc.)
Democratic
Elected U.S. Representative
James Langevin
Democratic

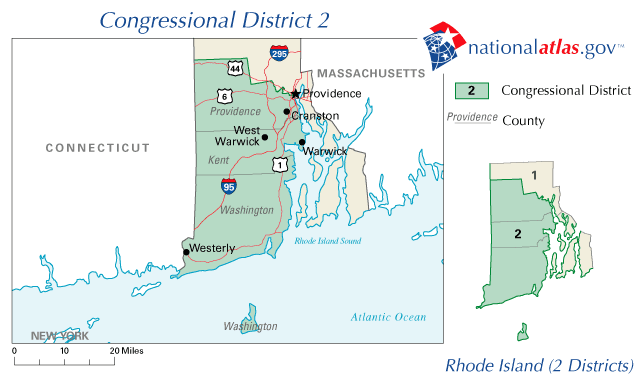

Incumbent Democrat Jim Langevin defeated independent Rod Driver. The district covers the southern part of the state.

=== Predictions ===
Source	Ranking	As of
The Cook Political Report	Safe D	November 6, 2006
Rothenberg	Safe D	November 6, 2006
Sabato's Crystal Ball	Safe D	November 6, 2006
Real Clear Politics	Safe D	November 7, 2006
CQ Politics	Safe D	November 7, 2006

Rhode Islands's 1st congressional district election, 2006
Party	Candidate	Votes	%
Democratic	James Langevin (inc.)	140,315	72.69
Independent	Rod Driver	52,729	27.31
Total votes		193,044	100.00
Democratic hold			
