= Avon Cinema =

Movie theater in Providence, Rhode Island

Coordinates: 41°49′43.9″N 71°24′3″W

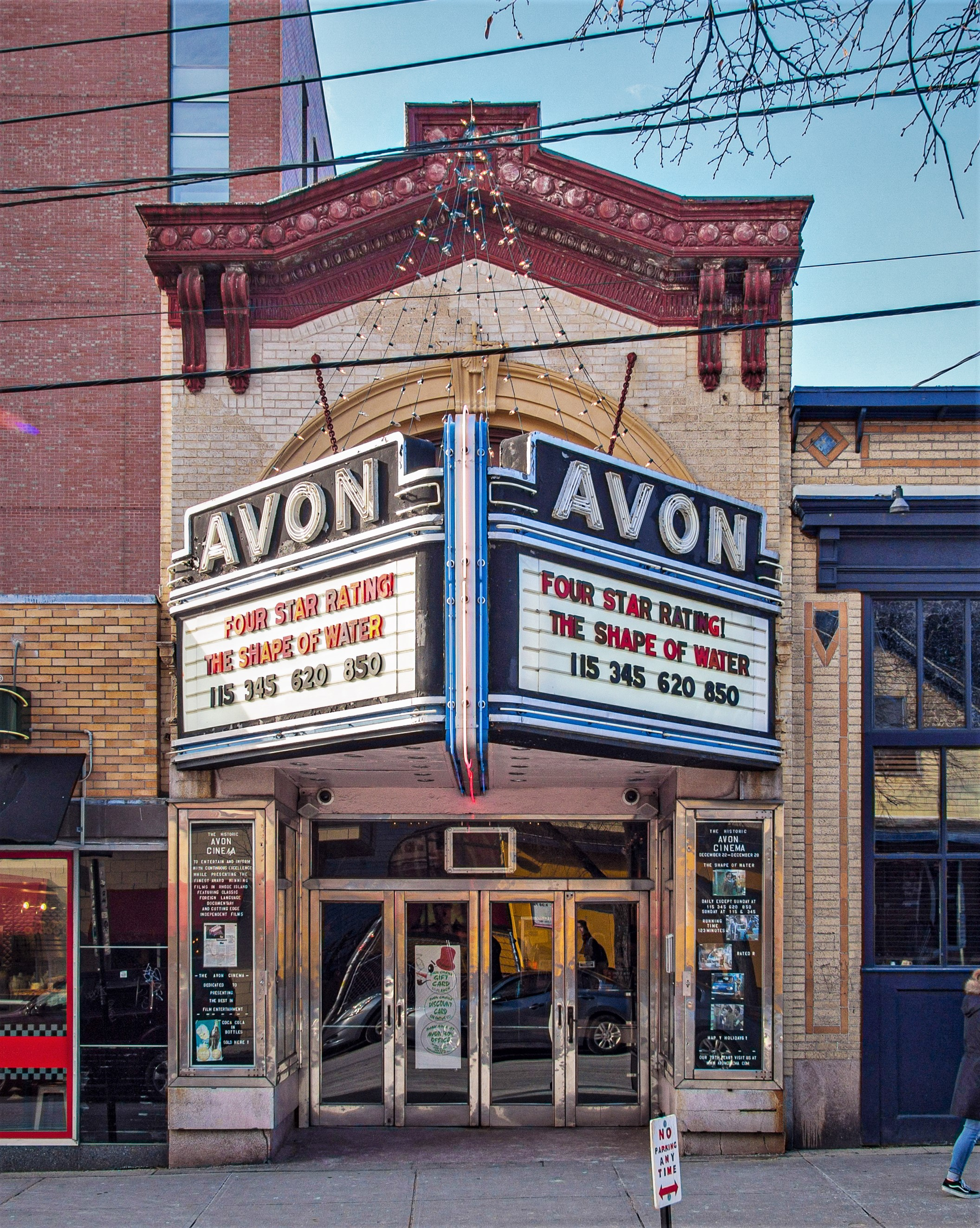
- (2017)

General information
- Status: Active
- Architectural style: Art Deco
- Location: 260 Thayer Street
- Completed: 1915
- Opened: February 1938 (as a cinema)
- Renovated: 1988
- Owner: Kenneth & Richard Dulgarian
- Landlord: Dulgarian Properties

Technical details
- Floor count: 2

Design and construction
- Known for: Independent cinema

Other information
- Seating capacity: 486
- Parking: None (street parking only)

Website
- Avon Cinema

The Avon Cinema is an independent movie theater near Brown University on the East Side of Providence, Rhode Island. The Avon's Art Deco styling dates from its opening in February 1938. The theater primarily screens independent, art house, and foreign films. The theatre has been owned by the same family since 1938. It seats 486 and has one screen.

== History ==
=== Toy Theater ===
The building at 260 Thayer Street began as the Toy Theater in 1915. The theater soon closed and possibly served as an amateur theatre or gymnasium with parking garage for a few years.

=== Dulgarian family ownership ===
The Dulgarian family purchased the theatre in 1938, advertising it as devoted to "the showing of unusual pictures." The new cinema debuted on February 15, 1938, with the French film Beethoven's Great Love (titled "The Life and Loves of Beethoven" in the U.S.). Tickets cost 50 cents for evening shows, 40 cents for matinees, and 25 cents before 2pm. In 1937, Louis Gordon Theatres Inc. leased the property from the Dulgarian Brothers with the intention of turning it back into a theater. Since then, any renovations have been minor and the property remains in the hands of the Dulgarians.

According to Cinema Treasures, the movie Marty premiered here, among others. They had what was also described as a "first-run 'class' policy" continuing through the 1960s. In the 1970s, the Avon became a repertory house and was known as the Avon Repertory Cinema. During the Blizzard of 1978, the Avon retained power despite a widespread outage.

In 1983, they returned to showing "first run foreign and domestic films of distinction." The owners kept the heat on, and allowed patrons to stay the night. A heavy maroon curtain to cover the screen was added in the 1970s, and in the 1980s a false ceiling was removed from the lobby to uncover the original arched ceiling. The theatre held a grand re-opening party in 1988 to celebrate the renovation.

A digital projector was installed in 2014, as distributors moved away from distributing films on 35mm reels. In 2018, the cinema celebrated 80 years of continuous operation in the hands of a single family. The owners said they try to "keep the experience as close to how our grandparents saw movies as possible."
