= Jack Reed (Rhode Island politician) =

American politician (born 1949)

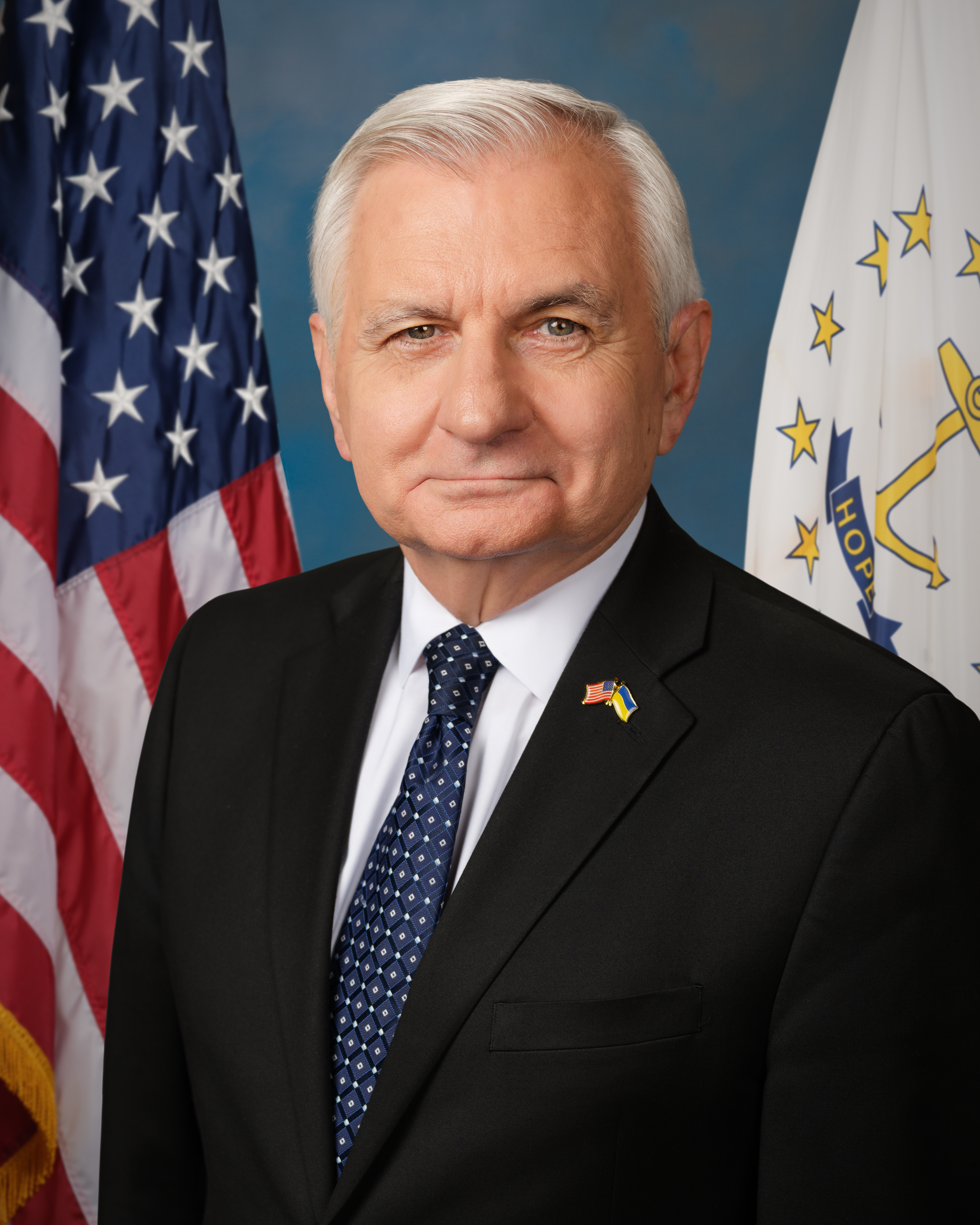
- Official portrait, 2025

Ranking Member of the Senate Armed Services Committee
- Incumbent
- Assumed office January 3, 2025
- Preceded by: Roger Wicker
- In office January 3, 2015 – February 3, 2021
- Preceded by: Jim Inhofe
- Succeeded by: Jim Inhofe

Chair of the Senate Armed Services Committee
- In office February 3, 2021 – January 3, 2025
- Preceded by: Jim Inhofe
- Succeeded by: Roger Wicker

United States Senator from Rhode Island
- Incumbent
- Assumed office January 3, 1997 Serving with Sheldon Whitehouse
- Preceded by: Claiborne Pell

Member of the U.S. House of Representatives from Rhode Island's 2nd district
- In office January 3, 1991 – January 3, 1997
- Preceded by: Claudine Schneider
- Succeeded by: Robert Weygand

Member of the Rhode Island Senate from the 12th district
- In office January 1, 1985 – January 1, 1991
- Preceded by: Robert Moretti
- Succeeded by: John O'Leary

Personal details
- Born: John Francis Reed; November 12, 1949 (age 77) Providence, Rhode Island, U.S.
- Party: Democratic
- Spouse: Julia Hart (m. 2005)
- Children: 1
- Education: United States Military Academy (BS); Harvard University (MPP, JD)
- Website: Senate website Campaign website

Military service
- Branch: United States Army; Army Reserve
- Service years: 1971–1979 (active); 1979–1991 (reserve)
- Rank: Major
- Unit: 82nd Airborne Division; 504th Infantry
- Reed's voice Reed supporting the 2022 NDAA. Recorded December 15, 2021

John Francis Reed (born November 12, 1949) is an American politician, lawyer, and former Army officer serving as the senior United States senator from Rhode Island, a seat he was first elected to in 1996. A member of the Democratic Party, he was the U.S. representative for Rhode Island's 2nd congressional district from 1991 to 1997. Reed graduated from the United States Military Academy and Harvard University. He served in the U.S. Army on active duty as an infantry officer in the 82nd Airborne Division from 1971 to 1979 and as a reservist from 1979 to 1991, retiring with the rank of major. He has been the dean of Rhode Island's congressional delegation since John Chafee died in 1999.

== Early life, education and career ==
Reed was born in Providence, the son of Mary Louise (née Monahan) and Joseph Anthony Reed. His father's family was Anglo-American but had become Catholic, and his mother's family was Irish-American. Reed graduated from La Salle Academy and the United States Military Academy at West Point, where he received a Bachelor of Science degree in 1971. After graduating, he spent several years in active duty military service. Reed earned the Ranger Tab and was a paratrooper. He served as a paratrooper in the 2nd Battalion, 504th Parachute Infantry Regiment, 82nd Airborne Division where he was a platoon leader, company commander and battalion staff officer.

Reed attended the John F. Kennedy School of Government at Harvard University, where he received a Master of Public Policy. He returned to West Point in 1978 as an associate professor in the Department of Social Sciences. He left active duty in 1979 after earning the rank of captain. He served in the United States Army Reserve until 1991, and retired as a major. After leaving active duty, Reed enrolled in Harvard Law School, where he became a member of the Board of Student Advisers. In 1982, he graduated with his Juris Doctor and worked as an associate at the Washington, D.C. office of law firm of Sutherland Asbill & Brennan. Afterward, he returned to Rhode Island and worked for the Providence law firm Edwards and Angell until 1990.

Reed was elected as a state senator in 1984 and served three terms.

== U.S. House of Representatives ==
In 1990, Reed was elected to the United States House of Representatives, receiving 59% of the vote in the general election. For the next six years, he focused on education and health care.

== U.S. Senate ==
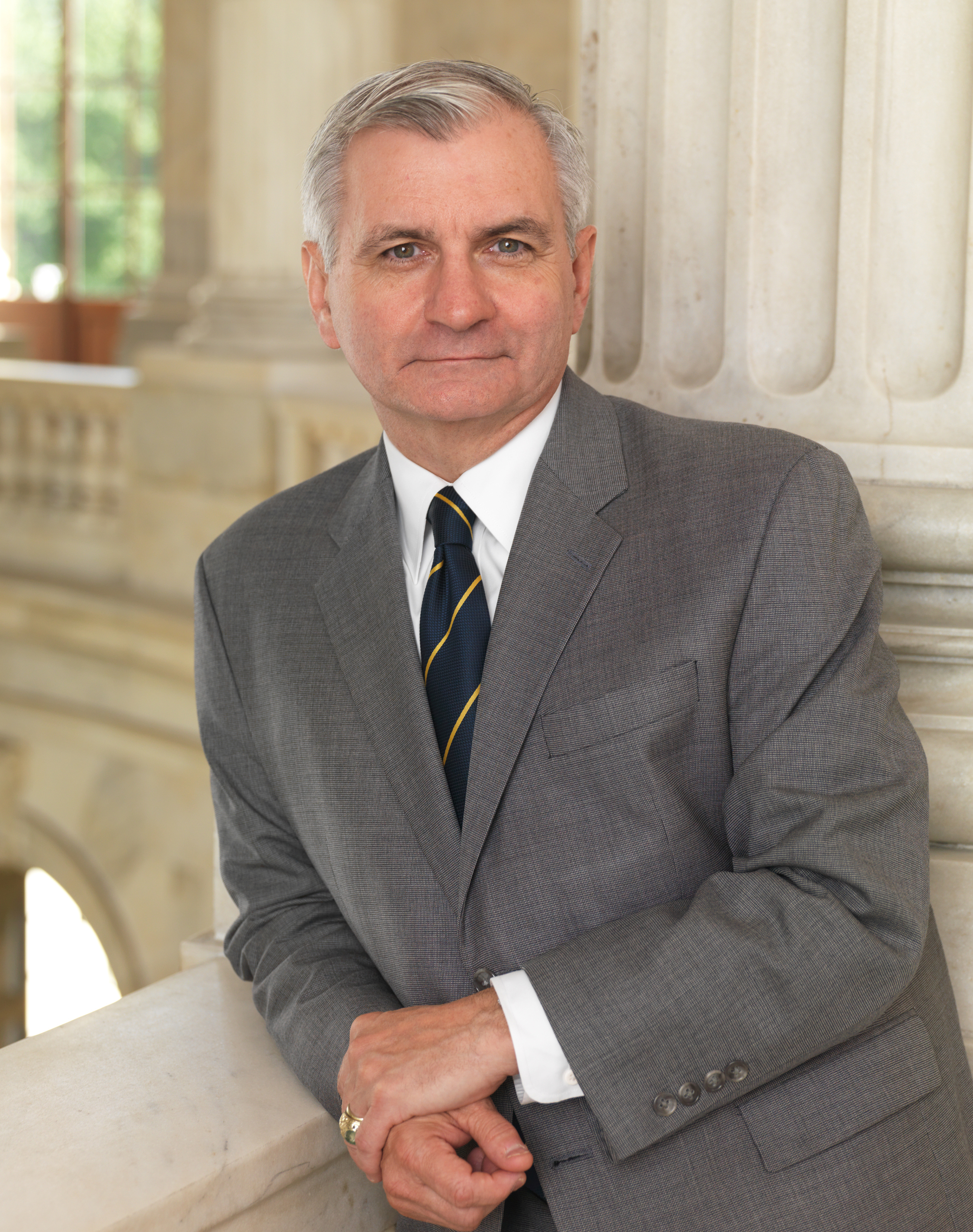
Reed during the 112th Congress

=== Elections ===
==== 1996 ====
When Senator Claiborne Pell, the longest-serving senator in Rhode Island's history and the 13th longest-serving senator in US history, announced his retirement in 1996, Reed declared his candidacy. Reed won the Democratic primary with 86% of the vote and beat the Republican nominee, Rhode Island General Treasurer Nancy Mayer, 63% to 35%.

==== 2002 ====
Reed ran for a second term. He was unopposed in the Democratic primary and his Republican opponent was Robert Tingle, a casino pit manager and the unsuccessful Republican nominee for the state's 2nd congressional district in 2000. Reed won by 78% to 22%.

==== 2008 ====
Reed ran for a third term. He won the Democratic primary with 87% of the vote. In the general election, he faced a rematch with Tingle, again winning in a landslide, 73% to 27%.

==== 2014 ====
Reed ran for a fourth term. Polling showed him leading prospective Republican opponents by margins of between 29% and 65%. Unopposed in the Democratic primary, Reed faced former congressional nominee and former Rhode Island Republican Party Chairman Mark Zaccaria in the general election. Reed won in another landslide, 71% to 29%.

==== 2020 ====
Reed ran for a fifth term. He won the Democratic primary unopposed. In the general election, he faced investment consultant Allen R. Waters and won in yet another landslide, 67% to 33%.

==== 2026 ====
Reed won a sixth Senate term.

=== Executive branch rumors ===
In 2008, Reed was mentioned as a potential vice presidential running mate for Barack Obama, but that July, Reed announced he was "not interested".

Reed has consistently been mentioned as a possible Secretary of Defense. In late 2010, he turned down Obama's offer to succeed Robert Gates as Secretary of Defense. The position was ultimately filled by Leon Panetta. After Obama was reelected in 2012 and Panetta announced his decision to retire, Reed was again mentioned as a possible nominee for the position, as well as for Director of the Central Intelligence Agency. Once again, he denied interest in either position.

When Panetta's successor Chuck Hagel announced his resignation in December 2014, Reed was again said to be on Obama's shortlist. Despite the Republican takeover of the Senate in the 2014 elections, it was said that Reed's confirmation would be a "foregone conclusion". He again denied interest, with a spokesman saying, "Senator Reed loves his job and wants to continue serving the people of Rhode Island in the United States Senate. He has made it very clear that he does not wish to be considered for Secretary of Defense or any other cabinet position. He just asked the people of Rhode Island to hire him for another six-year term and plans on honoring that commitment."

On November 24, 2014, Ted Nesi of WPRI-TV gave some reasons that Reed might be uninterested in cabinet positions, citing his "safe seat", his status as one of the most popular politicians in the state, his fondness for working in the Senate and his passion for housing policy. He concluded that "no matter how many times Reed's aides privately groan about another flareup of defense secretary speculation, they surely appreciate that each recurrence is a sign of the senator's positive reputation in Washington and Obama's esteem for him."

=== Committee assignments ===
Reed's committee assignments for the 118th Congress are as follows:

- Committee on Appropriations
  - Subcommittee on Commerce, Justice, Science, and Related Agencies
  - Subcommittee on Defense
  - Subcommittee on Interior, Environment, and Related Agencies
  - Subcommittee on Labor, Health and Human Services, Education, and Related Agencies
  - Subcommittee on the Legislative Branch (Chair)
  - Subcommittee on Military Construction, Veterans Affairs, and Related Agencies
  - Subcommittee on Transportation, Housing and Urban Development, and Related Agencies
- Committee on Armed Services (Chair)
  - As Chair, Reed is an ex officio member of all subcommittees.
- Committee on Banking, Housing, and Urban Affairs
  - Subcommittee on Financial Institutions and Consumer Protection
  - Subcommittee on Housing, Transportation, and Community Development
  - Subcommittee on Securities, Insurance, and Investment
- Select Committee on Intelligence (ex officio)

=== Caucus memberships ===
- Afterschool Caucuses

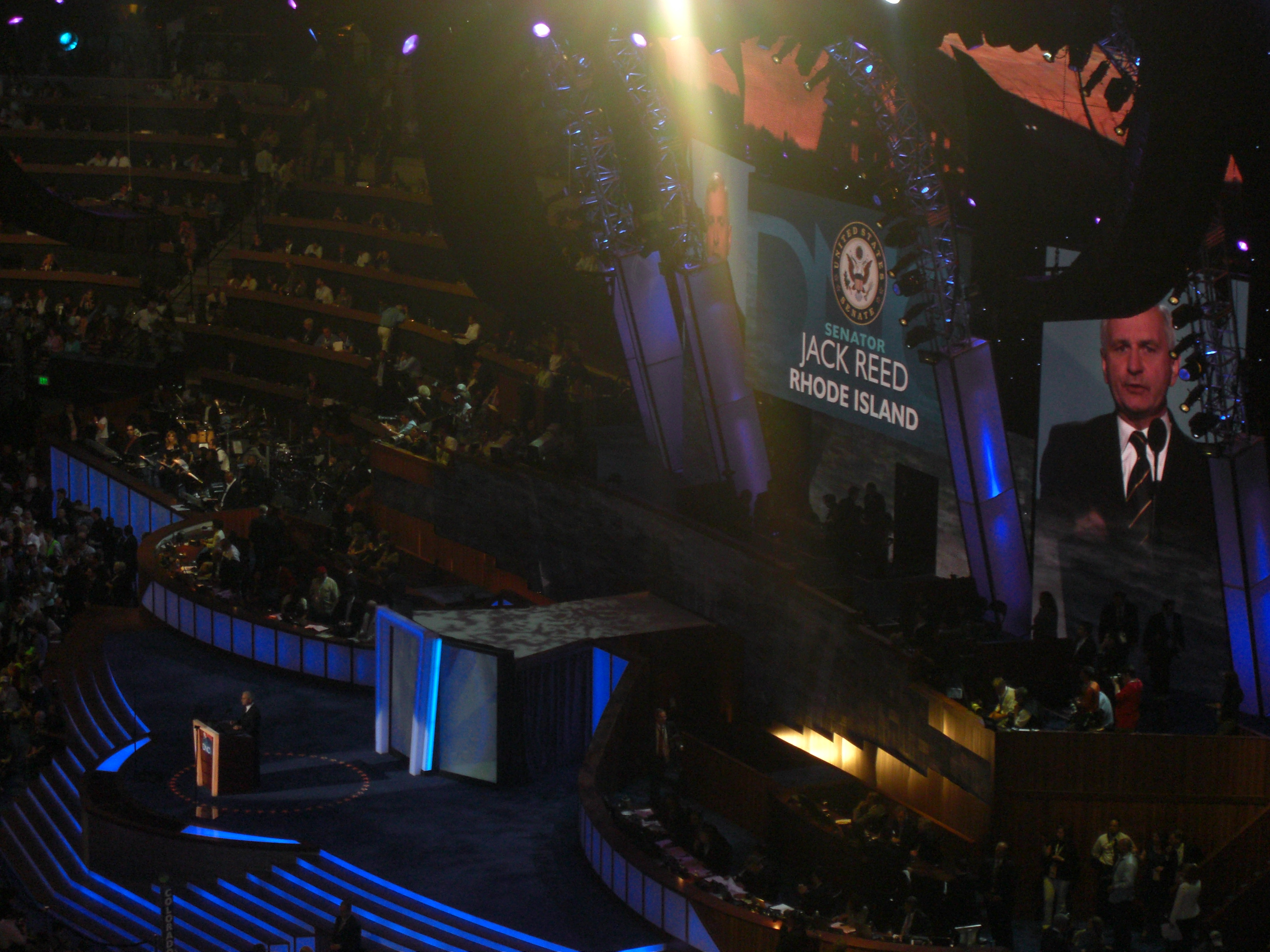
Reed speaking during the third night of the 2008 Democratic National Convention in Denver, Colorado.

=== Legislation sponsored ===
The following is an incomplete list of legislation that Reed has sponsored:

- Affordable College Textbook Act (S. 1864; 115th Congress)

== Political positions ==
Since his election to Congress, Reed has consistently voted in a similar manner to other New England Democrats, holding generally liberal positions on social and economic issues. He has voted with his party 94.7% of the time. Reed was rated among the Top 10 most popular senators in a Morning Consult poll from April 2024.

=== Abortion ===
Reed strongly supports abortion rights, and has rejected proposals to limit late-term abortion, ban such procedures from occurring on military installations, and deny minors the right to cross state lines to obtain abortions.

=== Civil rights ===
Reed supports affirmative action. He has voted to expand such policies and to set aside money for women and minorities from the highway fund. He also supported LGBTQ rights, voting against a proposed constitutional amendment to ban same-sex marriage and in favor of measures that prevent job discrimination and hate crimes against LGBTQ people.

=== Economy and jobs ===
Reed has generally supported fair trade policies over similar ones advocating free trade. He voted against renewing presidential authority to "fast-track" normalized trade relations. Reed opposed the Dominican Republic–Central America Free Trade Agreement and similar free trade proposals for Chile, Singapore, Peru, and Oman, but voted in favor of normalizing trade relations with China. He has also been a strong supporter of unionizing workers, and has criticized government and business interference with these groups. Reed supports increasing the minimum wage and unemployment compensation.

Reed serves on the Senate Banking Committee, which has held hearings into JP Morgan Chase bank's activities. He has accepted campaign contributions from its CEO Jamie Dimon.

=== Foreign policy ===
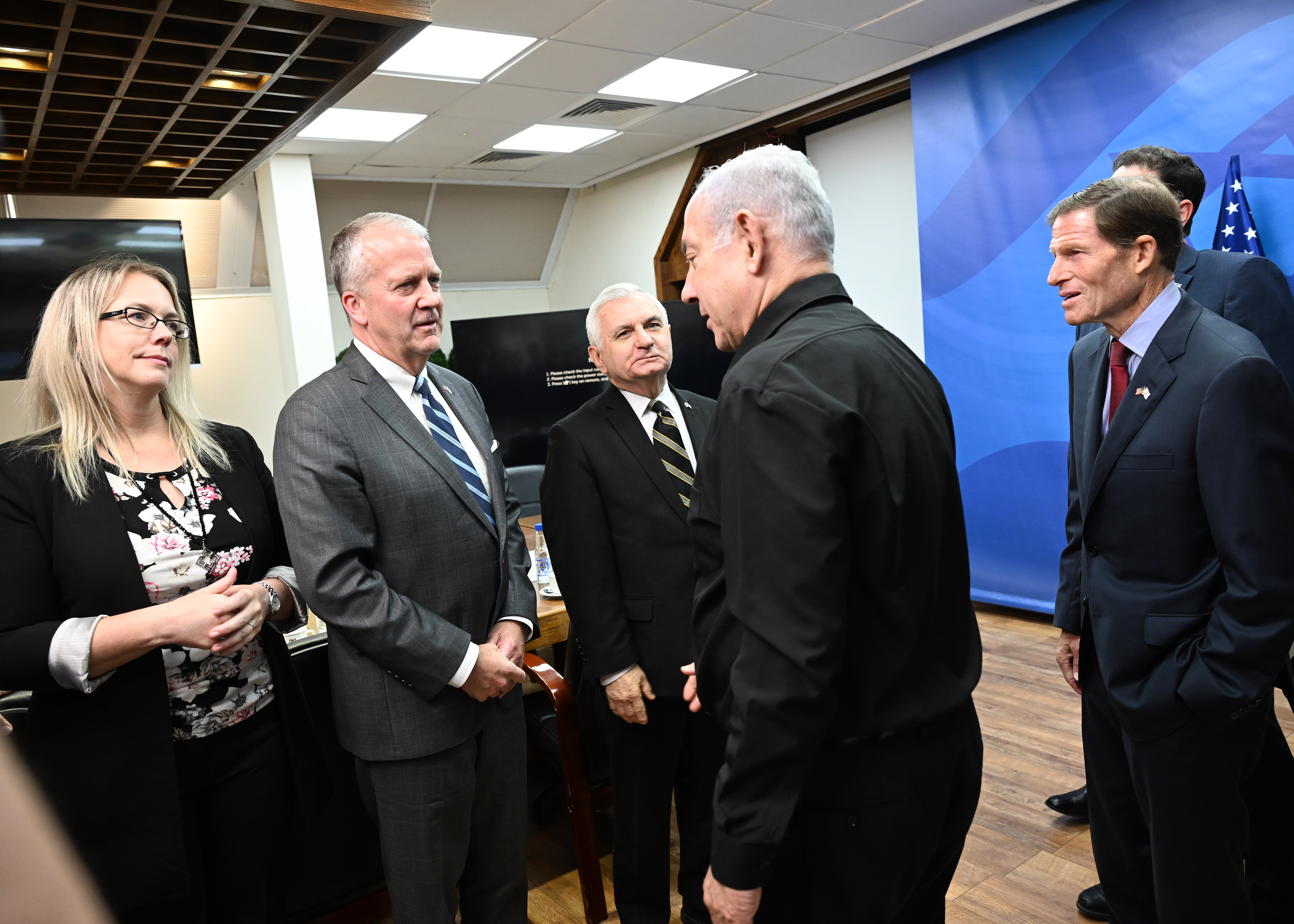
Reed with Israeli Prime Minister Benjamin Netanyahu on October 22, 2023

During the Twelve-Day War, in 2025, Reed said: "Israel's alarming decision to launch airstrikes on Iran is a reckless escalation that risks igniting regional violence".

In April 2026, Reed joined most Senate Democrats in supporting a resolution to block a sale of bulldozers to Israel, but was one of 11 to vote against another resolution the same day to block another sale to Israel of 1,000-pound bombs.

=== Election security ===
In July 2019, Reed and Minnesota Senator Amy Klobuchar sent a letter to Acting Homeland Security Secretary Kevin McAleenan requesting an explanation of the actions the Department of Homeland Security took in response to "unexpected behavior" of voting equipment in Durham County, North Carolina during the 2016 presidential election and writing that it was "critical that we learn as much as we can about the extent of the attacks we faced in 2016, and that these lessons be shared as widely as possible so that our nation is fully prepared for the 2020 elections."

=== Energy ===
Reed supports limiting American oil use and expanding alternative energy. He opposes Arctic National Wildlife Refuge drilling and federal subsidies for oil exploration, while favoring a 40% reduction in oil use by 2025 and funding for hydrogen automobiles. Reed has voted to end discussions on Corporate Average Fuel Economy standards, and has been an outspoken proponent of stronger restrictions of mercury use, as well as an end to commercial whaling.

=== Gun control ===
Reed supports gun control. He also supports a national assault weapon ban.

=== Healthcare ===
Reed has been an advocate of preventive healthcare. Like many other Democrats, he supports increasing Medicare funding, enrolling more Americans into programs that help the uninsured, allowing prescription drugs to be imported from Canada, and negotiating bulk medication purchases for Medicare in order to lower costs. Reed does not support Medicare for All. Instead, in 2019 he proposed the Choose Medicare Act, which he claims increases "access, competition, and choice."

=== Immigration ===
Even though he voted for the 1996 Immigration Reform Bill, Reed has generally supported allowing undocumented immigrants and foreign workers to enter the path to citizenship. He supports Guest Worker programs and giving immigrants access to Social Security. He opposed establishing English as the nation's official language and has been critical of the effort to fence the US-Mexican border. He is the author of the Reed Amendment, which permits former U.S. citizens to be denied entry to the country if they are believed to have renounced their citizenship for tax reasons. On February 23, 2010, Reed co-sponsored the DREAM Act, legislation that would allow undocumented students living in the United States from a very young age to gain legal status.

=== LGBTQIA+ rights ===
In October 2018, Reed was one of 20 senators to sign a letter to then Secretary of State Mike Pompeo urging him to reverse the rollback of a policy that granted visas to same-sex partners of LGBTQ diplomats who had unions that were not recognized by their home countries, writing that too many places around the world have seen LGBTQIA+ individuals "subjected to discrimination and unspeakable violence, and receive little or no protection from the law or local authorities", and that the US refusing to let LGBTQIA+ diplomats bring their partners to the US would be tantamount to upholding "the discriminatory policies of many countries around the world."

Reed supports transgender rights. He opposes a ban in the military that prevents military recruits and transgender troops from transitioning to another gender.

=== War in Iraq ===
Reed was one of 23 US senators to vote against H.J. Resolution 114, which authorized President George W. Bush to use force against Iraq in 2002. In 2007, he elaborated on his sentiments, saying, "It was a flawed strategy that diverted attention and resources away from hunting down Osama bin Laden's terrorist network." Like David Petraeus, Reed said he believed the real problems in Iraq were political and unrelated to the military.

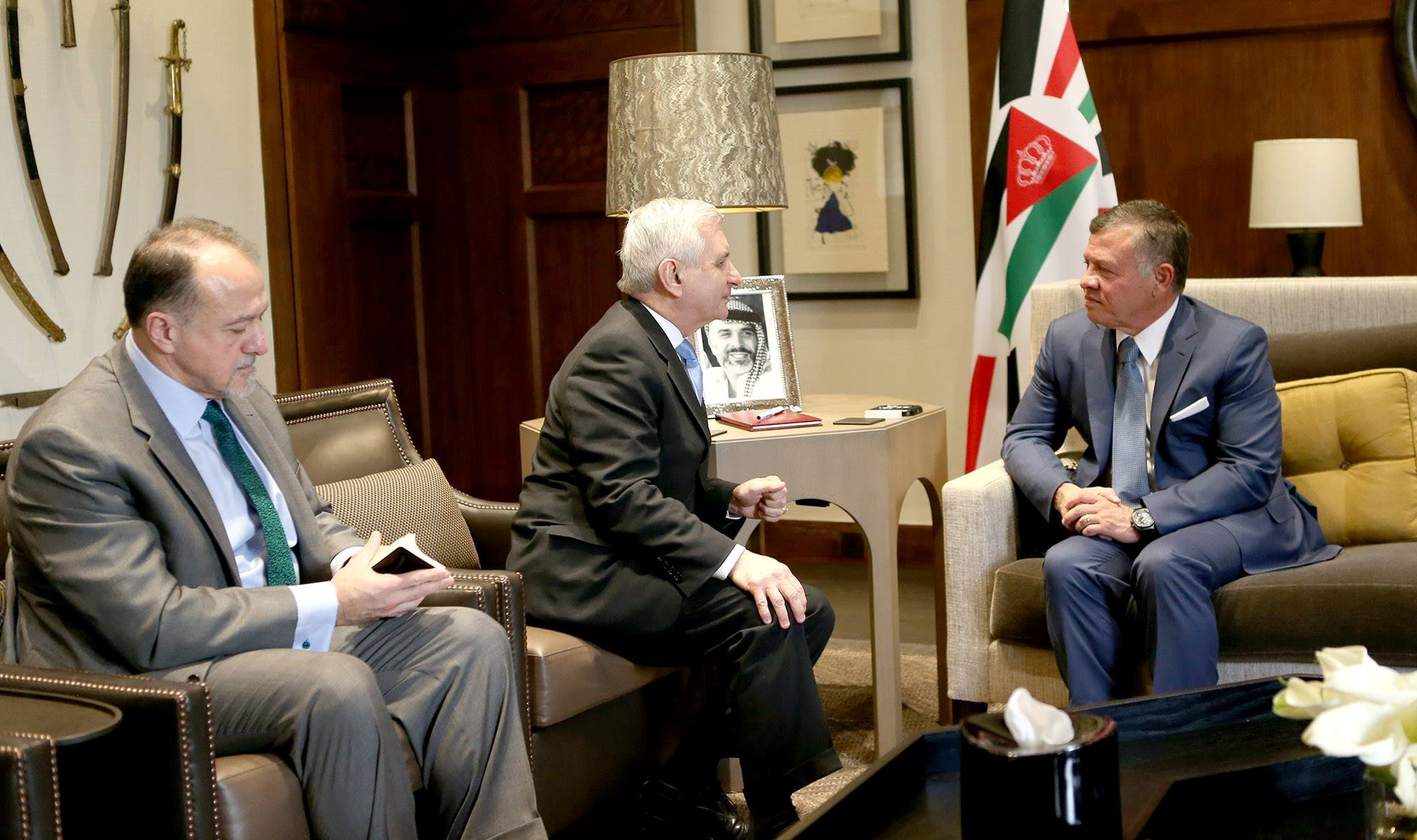
Reed and King Abdullah II of Jordan in February 2018

=== War in Yemen ===
In 2018, Reed was one of a few Democrats to support U.S. backing of the Saudi-led coalition fighting in Yemen. By 2019 he reversed his position, saying that he wanted to end U.S. support for the coalition. A network of progressive groups, including Demand Progress, Working Families Party, and Chapo Trap House, urged Reed to ensure that the 2020 National Defense Authorization Act withdrew support for the war.

=== Nagorno–Karabakh conflict ===
On October 1, 2020, Reed co-signed a letter to then Secretary of State Mike Pompeo that condemned Azerbaijan’s offensive operations against the Republic of Artsakh, denounced Turkey’s role in the Nagorno-Karabakh conflict and called for an immediate ceasefire. Reed said, "Armenians have a right to defend themselves when attacked."

=== War in Afghanistan ===
Reed supported President Joe Biden's decision to withdraw all U.S. troops from Afghanistan by September 2021. He said that "the president made a difficult, but the best of many poor choices."

=== Artificial intelligence ===
In June 2024, Reed joined Senators Mitt Romney, Jerry Moran, and Angus King in proposing a framework to mitigate the existential risk from artificial general intelligence. They said the framework "would apply to only the very largest and most advanced models" and would guard against threats to humans posed by AI.

== Personal life ==
Reed is Catholic. He married Senate staffer Julia Hart in the Catholic chapel on the United States Military Academy campus on April 16, 2005. On January 5, 2007, their daughter, Emily, was born.

== Electoral history ==
United States House of Representatives 2nd district Democratic primary election in Rhode Island, 1990

- √ Jack Reed 49.0%
- Edward Beard, Sr. 27.4%
- Charles Gifford, III 14.7%
- Rodney Driver 8.9%

United States House of Representatives 2nd district election in Rhode Island, 1990

- √ Jack Reed (D) 59.2%
- Gertrude Coxe (R) 40.8%

United States House of Representatives 2nd district Democratic primary election in Rhode Island, 1992

- √ Jack Reed (Incumbent) 76.4%
- Spencer Dickinson 23.6%

United States House of Representatives 2nd district election in Rhode Island, 1992

- √ Jack Reed (D) (Incumbent) 70.7%
- James Bell (R) 24.5%
- Thomas Ricci (I) 3.3%
- John Turnbull (IT) 1.6%

United States House of Representative 2nd district election in Rhode Island, 1994

- √ Jack Reed (D) (Incumbent) 68.0%
- John Elliot (R) 32.0%

United States Senate Democratic primary election in Rhode Island, 1996

- √ Jack Reed 86.1%
- Don Gil 13.9%

United States Senate election in Rhode Island, 1996

- √ Jack Reed (D) 63.3%
- Nancy Mayer (R) 35.0%
- Donald W. Lovejoy (I) 1.7%

United States Senate election in Rhode Island, 2002

- √ Jack Reed (D) (Incumbent) 78.4%
- Robert G. Tingle (R) 21.6%

United States Senate Democratic primary election in Rhode Island, 2008

- √ Jack Reed (incumbent) 86.8%
- Christopher Young 13.2%

United States Senate election in Rhode Island, 2008

- √ Jack Reed (D) (Incumbent) 73.4%
- Robert G. Tingle (R) 27.6%

United States Senate election in Rhode Island, 2014

- √ Jack Reed (D) (Incumbent) 71%
- Mark Zaccaria (R) 29%

United States Senate election in Rhode Island, 2020

- √ Jack Reed (D) (Incumbent) 66.5%
- Allen Waters (R) 33.4%

== Honors ==
- Grand-Officer of the Order of Prince Henry, Portugal (June 1, 1998)
- 2012. American Library Association Honorary Membership

U.S. House of Representatives
Preceded by Claudine Schneider	Member of the U.S. House of Representatives from Rhode Island's 2nd congressional district 1991–1997	Succeeded by Robert Weygand
Party political offices
Preceded by Claiborne Pell	Democratic nominee for U.S. Senator from Rhode Island (Class 2); 1996, 2002, 2008, 2014, 2020, 2026	Most recent
U.S. Senate
Preceded by Claiborne Pell	U.S. Senator (Class 2) from Rhode Island; 1997–present Served alongside: John Chafee, Lincoln Chafee, Sheldon Whitehouse	Incumbent
Preceded by Jim Inhofe	Ranking Member of the Senate Armed Services Committee; 2015–2021	Succeeded by Jim Inhofe
Preceded by Jim Inhofe	Chair of the Senate Armed Services Committee; 2021–2025	Succeeded by Roger Wicker
Preceded by Roger Wicker	Ranking Member of the Senate Armed Services Committee; 2025–present	Incumbent
U.S. order of precedence (ceremonial)
Preceded by Ron Wyden	Order of precedence of the United States as United States Senator	Succeeded by Susan Collins
Preceded by Dick Durbin	United States senators by seniority 6th	Succeeded by Susan Collins
