= 2002 United States Senate election in Rhode Island =

- November 5, 2002
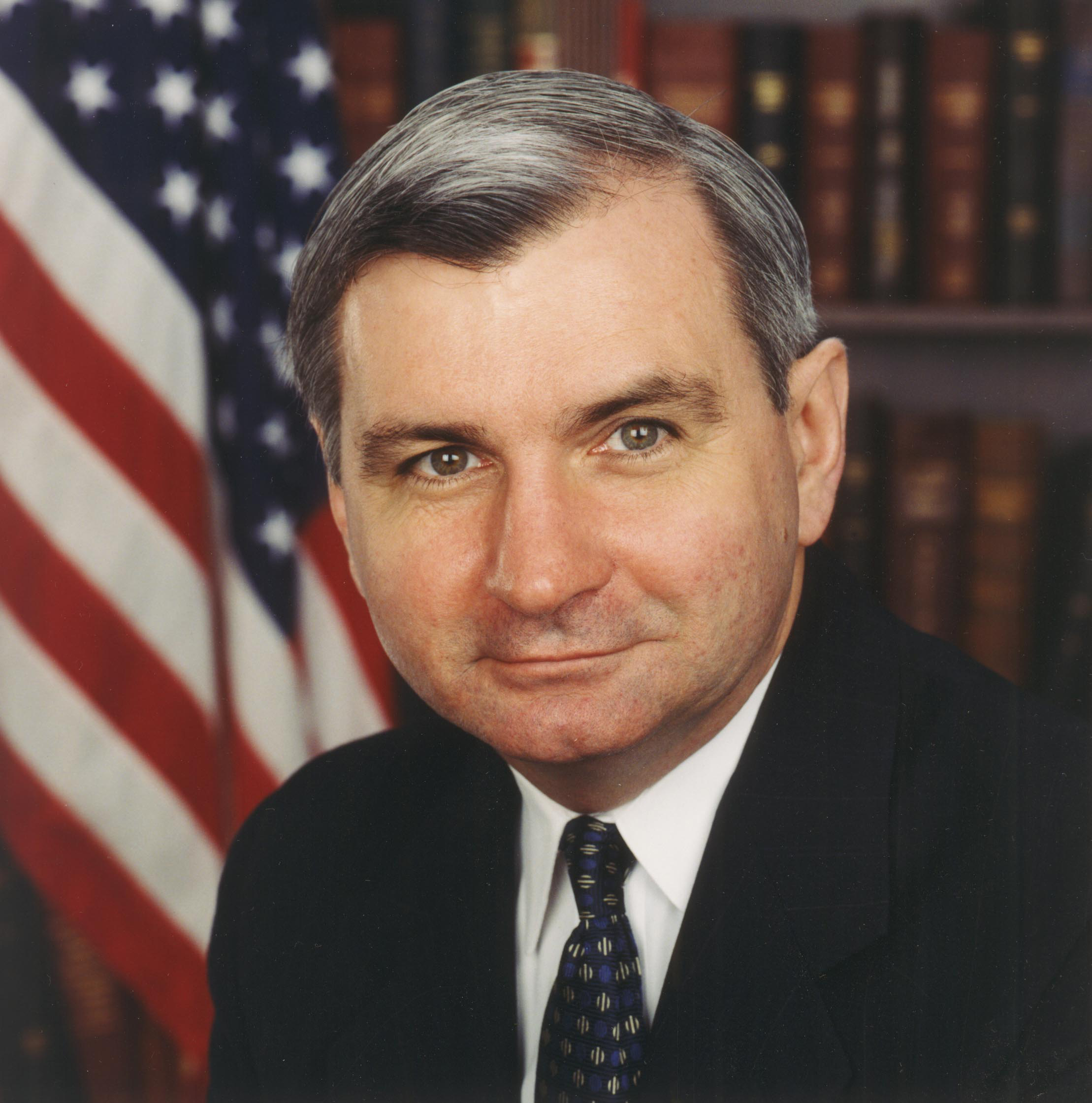

Nominee	Jack Reed	Robert Tingle
Party	Democratic	Republican
Popular vote	253,922	69,881
Percentage	78.43%	21.57%
- Reed: 60–70% 70–80% 80–90%
U.S. senator before election
Jack Reed
Democratic
Elected U.S. Senator
Jack Reed
Democratic

The 2002 United States Senate election in Rhode Island took place on November 5, 2002. Incumbent Democratic U.S. Senator Jack Reed won re-election to a second term with nearly 80% of the vote, marking the best performance in his senatorial career as of 2026. Reed's best performance was in Providence County, where he won with over 80% of the vote.

== Democratic primary ==
=== Candidates ===
- Jack Reed, incumbent U.S. Senator

=== Results ===
Democratic primary results
Party	Candidate	Votes	%
Democratic	Jack Reed (incumbent)	85,315	100.00%
Total votes		85,315	100.00%

== Republican primary ==
=== Candidates ===
- Robert Tingle, casino pit boss and nominee for RI-02 in 2000

=== Results ===
Republican Party primary results
Party	Candidate	Votes	%
Republican	Robert Tingle	16,041	100.00%
Total votes		16,041	100.00%

== General election ==
=== Candidates ===
- Jack Reed (D), incumbent U.S. Senator
- Robert Tingle (R), casino pit boss and nominee for RI-02 in 2000

=== Campaign ===
Reed was an extremely popular senator who got token opposition in the general election. A May Brown University poll showed the incumbent with a 73% approval rating, higher than any other elected lawmaker in the state. In June 2002, Tingle announced his candidacy. Tingle described himself as a working man with a family, while Reed is single and a veteran politician. In an October poll, Reed was up 61% to 14%.

=== Predictions ===
Source	Ranking	As of
Sabato's Crystal Ball	Safe D	November 4, 2002

=== Results ===
General election results
Party	Candidate	Votes	%	±%
Democratic	Jack Reed (incumbent)	253,922	78.43%	+15.12%
Republican	Robert Tingle	69,881	21.57%	−13.38%
Majority		183,966	56.85%	+28.50%
Turnout		323,803		
Democratic hold		Swing		

==== By county ====
	Jack Reed Democratic		Robert Tingle Republican	
County	Votes	%	Votes	%
Bristol	13,489	75.79%	4,308	24.21%
Kent	45,381	76.16%	14,209	23.84%
Newport	21,345	74.17%	7,435	25.83%
Providence	140,443	81.47%	31,948	18.53%
Washington	33,264	73.52%	11,981	26.48%

== See also ==
- 2002 United States Senate election
