= Thayer Street =

Road in Rhode Island, United States

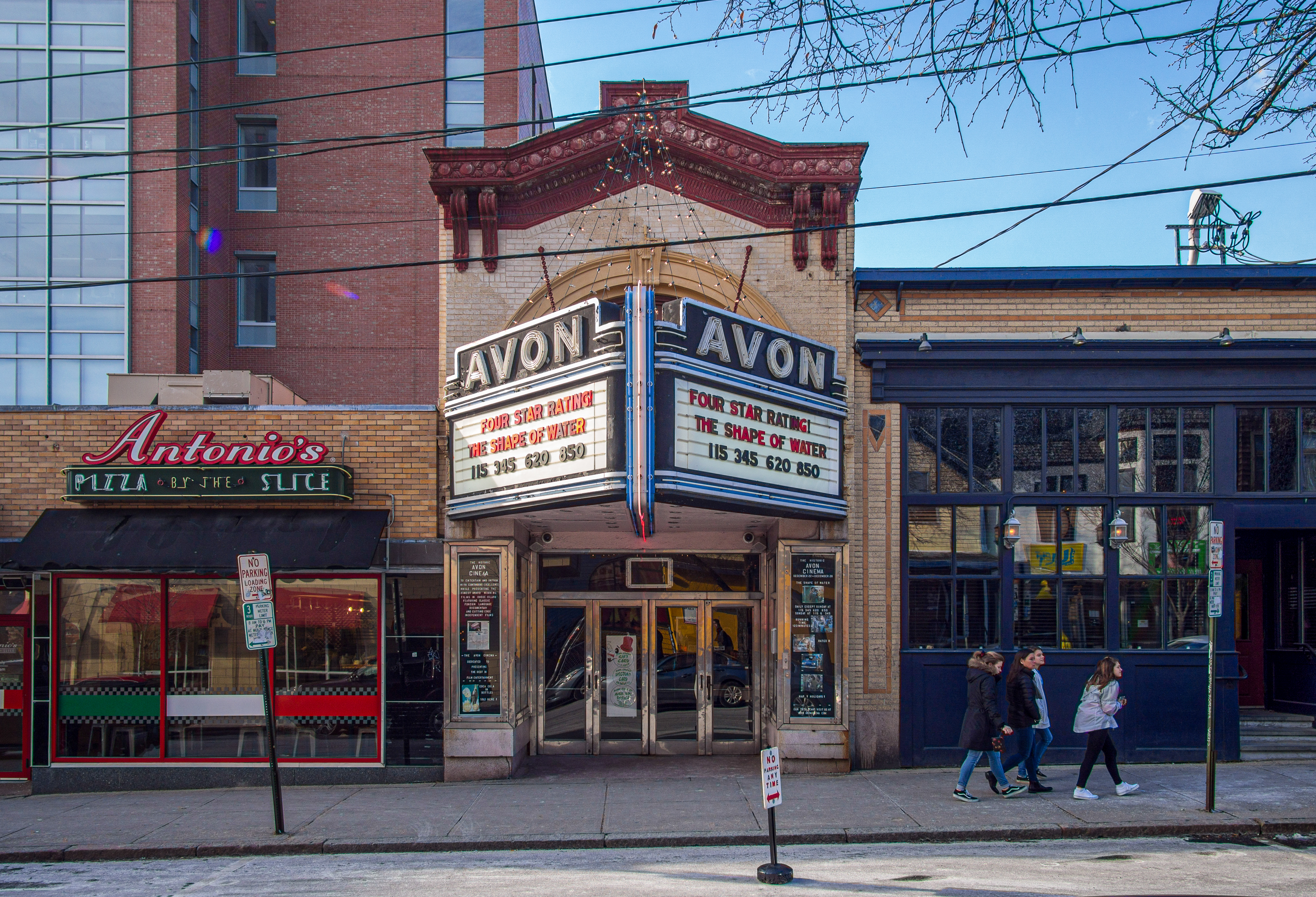
- Former name: Cross Street
- Location: College Hill, Providence, Rhode Island

Thayer Street in Providence, Rhode Island is a popular destination for students of the area's nearby schools of Brown University, Moses Brown School, Hope High School, Wheeler School, Rhode Island School of Design, Providence College, Johnson & Wales University, and Rhode Island College.

== History ==
Thayer was initially designated in 1799 as Cross Street. In 1823, the street's name was changed to Thayer after Dr. Williams Thayer, great-great-grandson of Roger Williams. It was once the home to the Thayer Street Grammar School (built in 1866–1867), located at the corner of Thayer and Meeting streets.

== Neighborhood information ==
Thayer Street is located in the College Hill neighborhood on the East Side of Providence. Some Brown University student housing and academic buildings are on Thayer Street.

Similar to Harvard Square in Cambridge, Massachusetts, Nassau Street in Princeton, New Jersey, and Telegraph Avenue in Berkeley, California, Thayer Street hosts independent shops and restaurants that serve as a communal center for students and locals. While Harvard Square has long been dominated by chain restaurants and stores, many businesses on Thayer remain independent, such as Avon Cinema.

Starting in the mid-2000s, there has been a general increase in the proportion of Thayer Street businesses that serve food. Neighborhood residents and some other community members argue that landlords should try to lease space to retail stores instead of new restaurants. This preference is due in part to the limited parking currently available on College Hill. City zoning regulations require far fewer off-street parking spaces for retail businesses than for restaurants. Residents also complain of noise late at night and the College Hill Neighborhood Association, an organization representing College Hill residents, generally fights against applications for liquor licenses on Thayer Street.

== Images ==
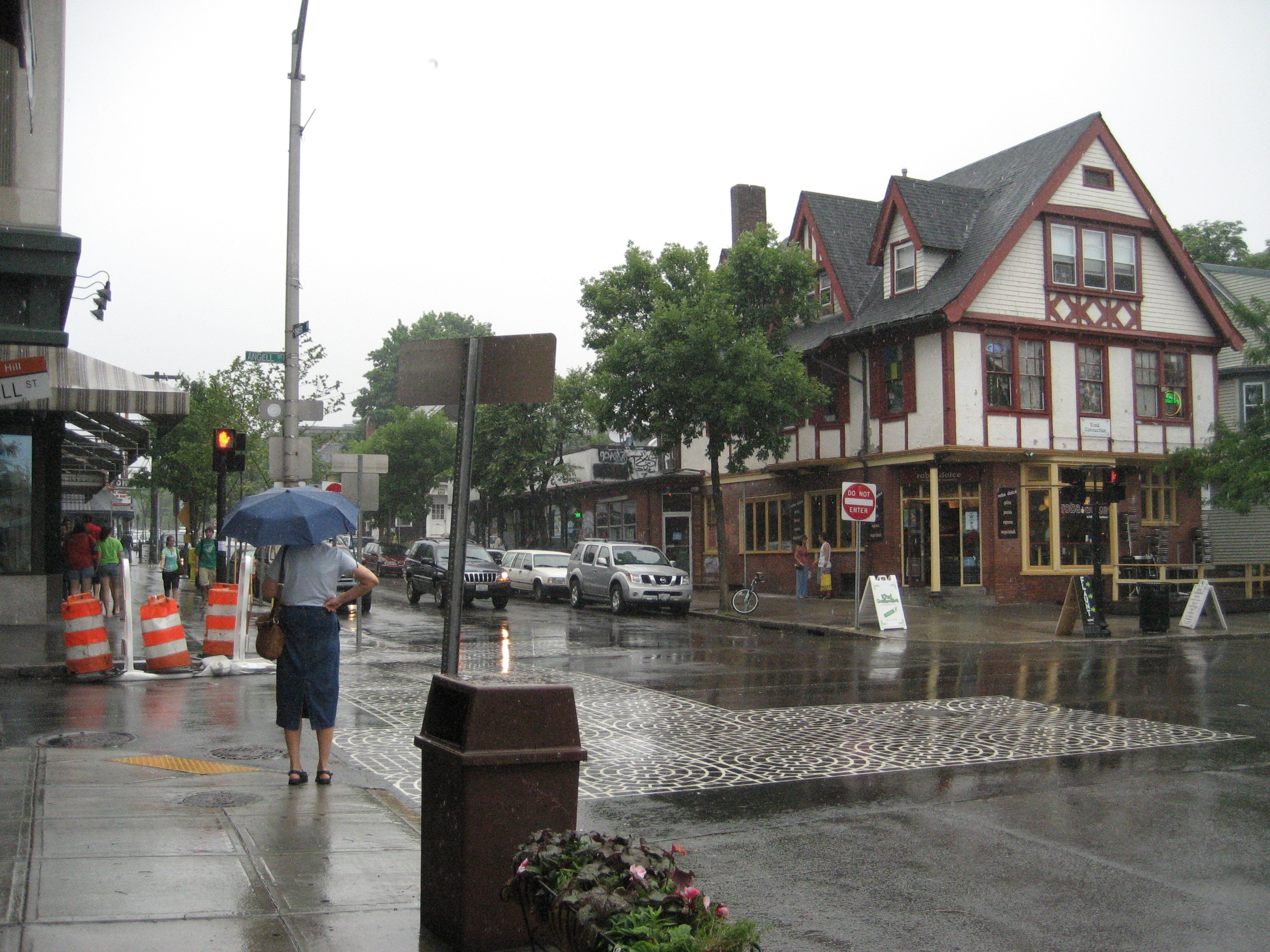

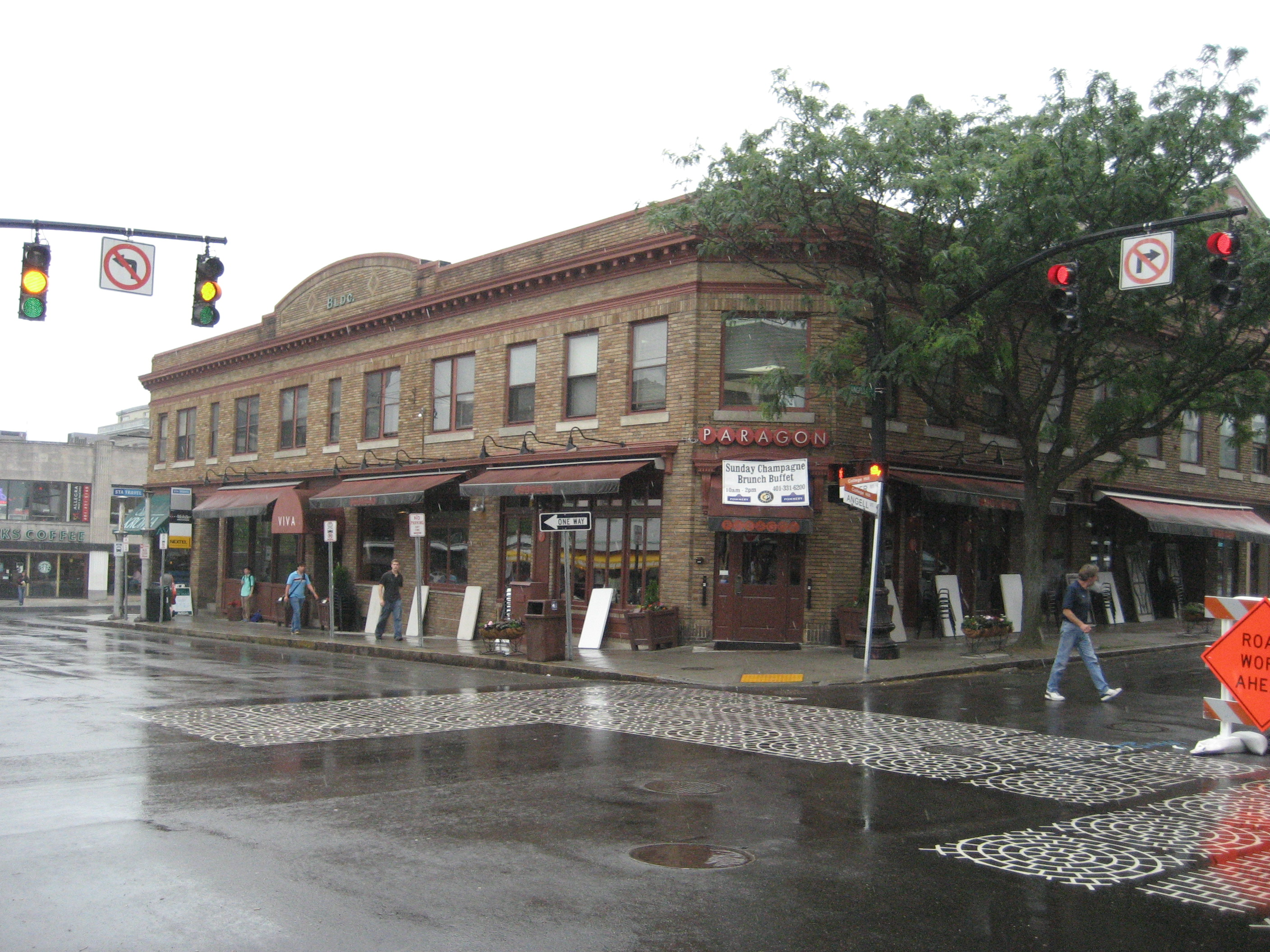

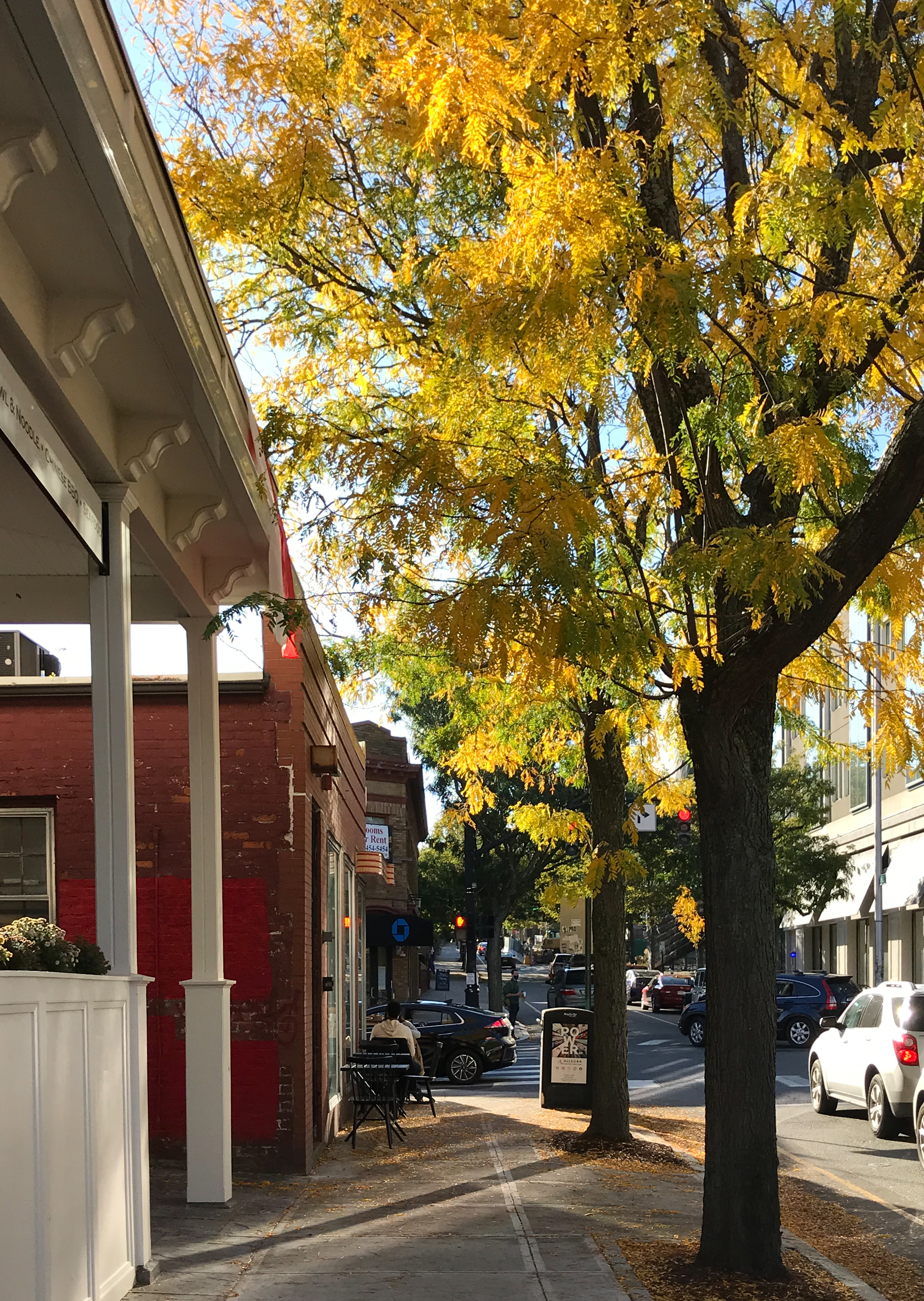

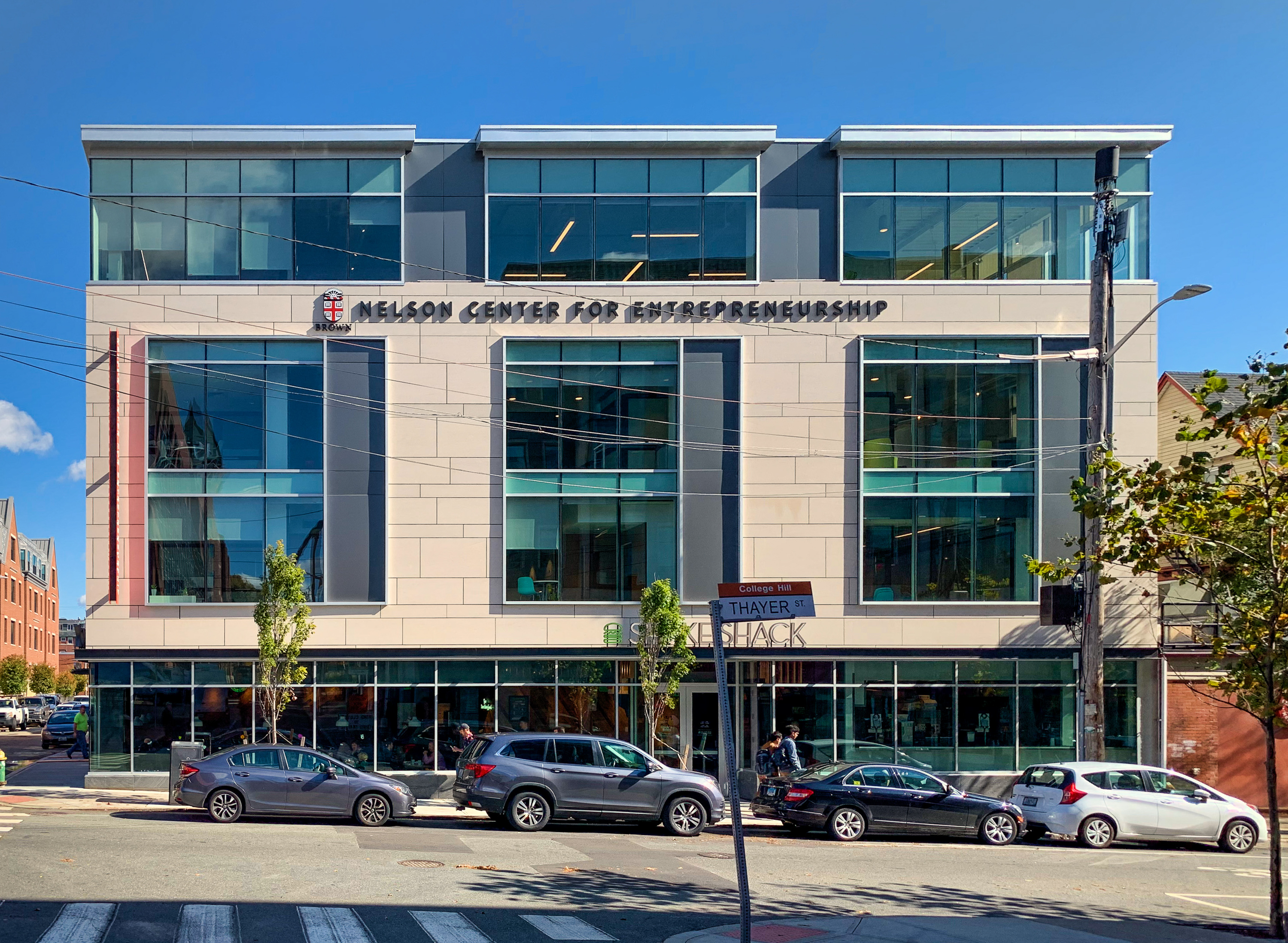

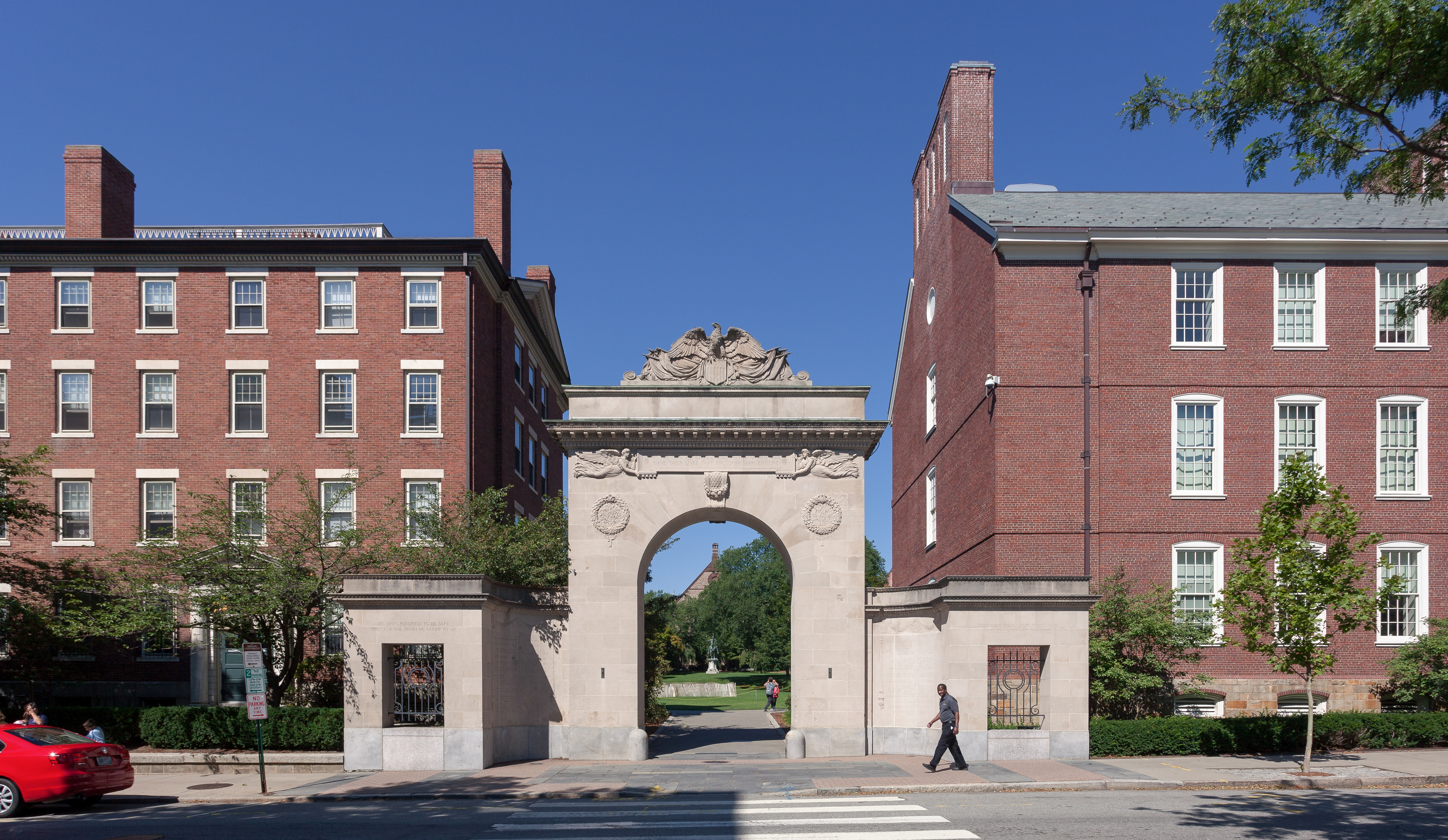
