= Mike Stenhouse =

American baseball player (born 1958)

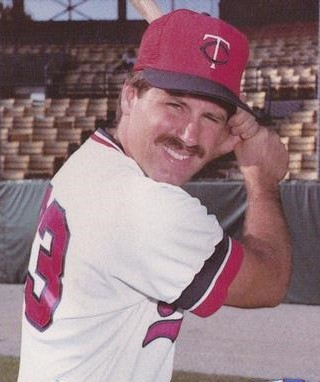
- Outfielder
- Born: May 29, 1958 (age 68); Pueblo, Colorado, U.S.
- Batted: Left Threw: Right

MLB debut
- October 3, 1982, for the Montreal Expos

Last MLB appearance
- July 23, 1986, for the Boston Red Sox

MLB statistics
- Batting average: .190
- Home runs: 9
- Runs batted in: 40
- Stats at Baseball Reference

Teams
- Montreal Expos (1982–1984); Minnesota Twins (1985); Boston Red Sox (1986)

Michael Steven Stenhouse (born May 29, 1958) is an American former outfielder, first baseman, and designated hitter in Major League Baseball who played for the Montreal Expos from 1982-1984, the Minnesota Twins in 1985, and the Boston Red Sox in 1986. Stenhouse is the CEO of the Rhode Island Center for Freedom and Prosperity, a public policy think tank. Listed at 6'1", 195 lb., Stenhouse batted left-handed and threw right-handed. He is the son of pitcher Dave Stenhouse.

A star in high school, Mike turned down opportunities at some of the top baseball colleges, including Arizona State University, in order to attend Harvard. He played three seasons for the school's baseball program (1977–1979) and was a two time All-Ivy Leaguer and hit .475 as a freshman in 1977, second-best in NCAA Division I. He was an American Baseball Coaches Association All-American, joining Kirk Gibson, Hubie Brooks and Bob Horner.

In 1977–79, Stenhouse played collegiate summer baseball for the Chatham A's of the Cape Cod Baseball League (CCBL). He hit .426 with 6 home runs in 13 games in 1978 before an injury cut short his season, and was a league all-star in 1979. Stenhouse was inducted into the CCBL Hall of Fame in 2008.

He was drafted by the Oakland Athletics with the 26th overall pick of the 1979 Major League Baseball draft. He was offered only $12,000 by Charlie Finley and opted to return to college when the commissioner's office refused to make him a free agent. Finley later offered the same amount of money with the stipulation of a September call-up, but Mike backed out when this was not put in writing. Stenhouse was selected fourth overall in the 1980 January draft by the Montreal Expos. He signed for a $32,000 bonus this time.

He was called up for the first time in 1982, striking out in his only at bat. After two sub-par seasons, he was traded by the Expos to the Minnesota Twins for Jack O'Connor. There he had career highs in games played (81), at bats (179), runs (23) hits (40), home runs (5), RBI (21), stolen bases (1), walks (29), and batting average (.223). That December he was traded by the Twins to the Boston Red Sox for Charlie Mitchell. In his final major league season he went 2 for 21 (.095), but walked 12 times and had an on-base percentage of .424.

In 1996, Stenhouse was an announcer for the Expos on CIQC. He had previously been an analyst for the Pawtucket Red Sox.

== See also ==
- List of second-generation Major League Baseball players
