= 2008 United States Senate election in Rhode Island =

- November 4, 2008
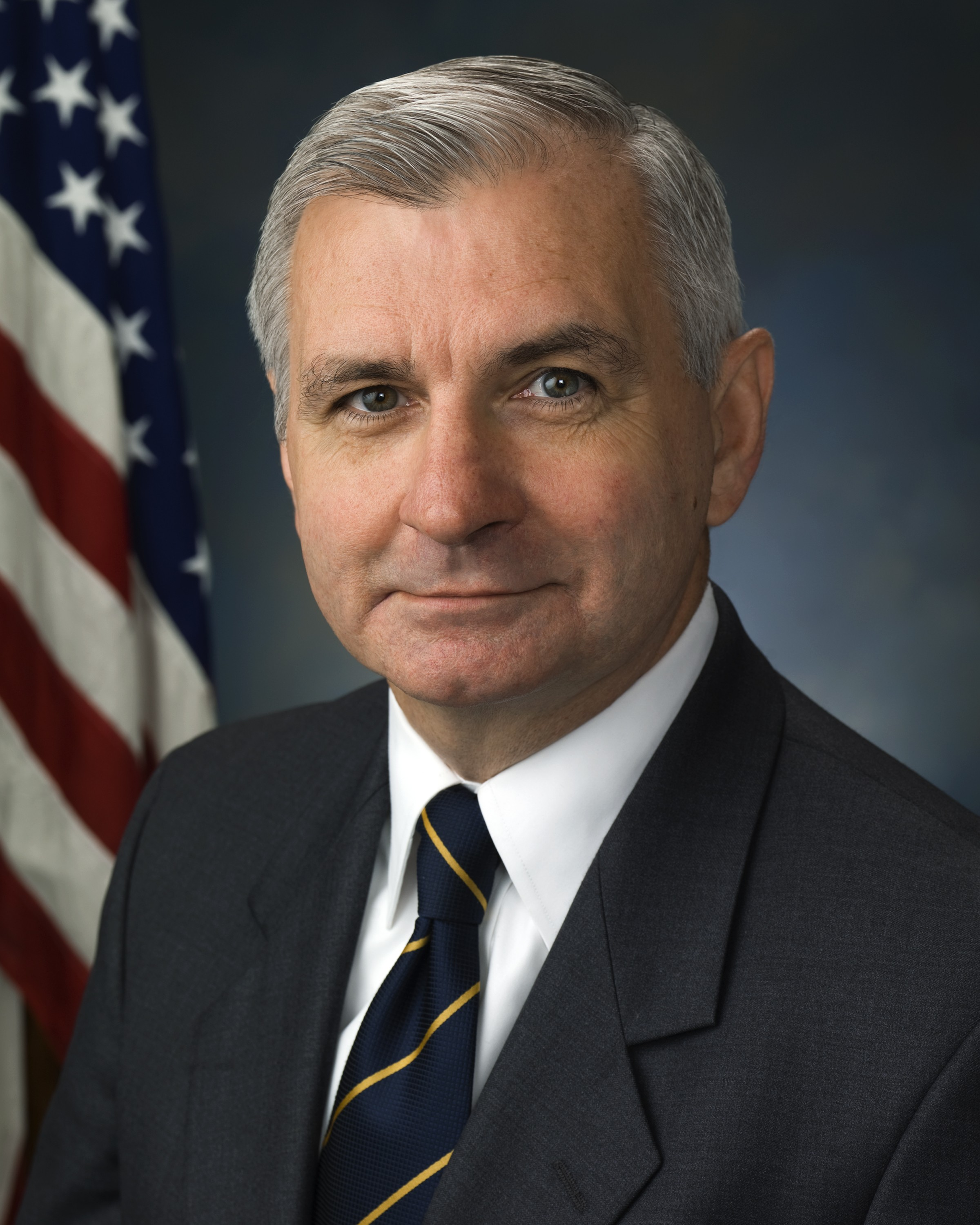

Nominee	Jack Reed	Robert Tingle
Party	Democratic	Republican
Popular vote	320,644	116,174
Percentage	73.40%	26.60%
- Reed: 50–60% 60–70% 70–80% 80–90%
U.S. senator before election
Jack Reed
Democratic
Elected U.S. Senator
Jack Reed
Democratic

The 2008 United States Senate election in Rhode Island took place on November 4, 2008, to elect a member of the United States Senate to represent the state of Rhode Island. Democratic incumbent Jack Reed won re-election to a third term, defeating Republican nominee Robert Tingle.

== Democratic primary ==
=== Candidates ===
==== Nominee ====
- Jack Reed, incumbent U.S. senator (1997–present)

==== Eliminated in primary ====
- Chris Young, perennial candidate

=== Results ===
2008 Rhode Island U.S. Senator Democratic primary election
Party	Candidate	Votes	%	±%
Democratic	Jack Reed (incumbent)	48,038	86.8	
Democratic	Christopher Young	7,277	13.2	

== General election ==
=== Candidates ===
- Jack Reed (D), incumbent U.S. Senator
- Robert Tingle (R), 2002 nominee, 2000 U.S. House nominee, and pit boss at Foxwoods Resort Casino

=== Predictions ===
Source	Ranking	As of
The Cook Political Report	Safe D	October 23, 2008
CQ Politics	Safe D	October 31, 2008
Rothenberg Political Report	Safe D	November 2, 2008
Real Clear Politics	Safe D	November 4, 2008

=== Polling ===
Poll source	Date(s) administered	Sample size (Note: Key: A – all adults RV – registered voters LV – likely voters V – unclear)	Margin of error	Jack Reed (D)	Robert Tingle (D)	Undecided
Rasmussen Reports	July 1, 2008	500 (LV)	± 4.5%	72%	20%	8%

=== Results ===
2008 Rhode Island U.S. Senator general election
Party	Candidate	Votes	%	±%
Democratic	Jack Reed (incumbent)	320,644	73.40%	−5.03%
Republican	Bob Tingle	116,174	26.60%	+5.03%
Majority		204,470	46.81%	−10.05%
Turnout		436,818		
Democratic hold		Swing		

==== By county ====
	Jack Reed Democratic		Robert Tingle Republican		Others	
County	Votes	%	Votes	%	Votes	%
Bristol	17,507	72.2%	6,657	27.5%	84	0.3%
Kent	55,643	69.6%	23,885	29.9%	401	0.5%
Newport	27,981	71.4%	11,121	28.4%	114	0.3%
Providence	176,273	75.6%	55,607	23.9%	1,140	0.5%
Washington	43,240	69.3%	18,904	30.3%	255	0.4%

== See also ==
- 2008 United States Senate elections
