= List of presidential trips made by George H. W. Bush (1990) =

This is a list of presidential trips made by George H. W. Bush during 1990, the second year of his presidency as the 41st president of the United States. International trips are highlighted in blue.

This list excludes trips made within Washington, D.C., the U.S. federal capital in which the White House, the official residence and principal workplace of the president, is located. It also excludes the capital's immediate surroundings in Maryland and Virginia, such as Andrews Air Force Base in Maryland, where the president typically boards Air Force One for all trips outside the area. Also excluded are trips to Camp David, the country residence of the president, and to the Bush family compound in Kennebunkport, Maine.

== January ==
State or country	Areas visited	Dates	Details
Texas	Houston	January 1	Stayed at The Houstonian Hotel.
Alabama	Montgomery	January 1	Went bass fishing with Ray Scott.
Massachusetts	Lincoln	January 2	Attended the funeral of his brother-in-law Alexander Ellis II at St. Joseph's Catholic Church.
Florida	Orlando, Lake Buena Vista	January 8	Addressed the American Farm Bureau Federation at the Orange County Convention Center. Toured EPCOT Center at Walt Disney World Resort.
Ohio	Cincinnati	January 12	Visited Robert A. Taft High School. Addressed the Greater Cincinnati Chamber of Commerce at the Hyatt hotel.
Georgia	Atlanta	January 19	Addressed the National Association of Home Builders convention at the Omni Coliseum.
Florida	Miami	January 19	Toured Everglades National Park. Campaigned for Governor Bob Martinez at the Omni hotel.
Missouri	Kansas City	January 23	Met with the AdHoc Group Against Crime at Metropolitan Missionary Baptist Church. Visited a former crack house on Park Avenue. Addressed law enforcement officials at Municipal Auditorium.

== February ==
State or country	Areas visited	Dates	Details
North Carolina	Raleigh	February 2	Visited a semiconductor laboratory at North Carolina State University's Cox Hall.
Tennessee	Knoxville	February 2	Spoke at the University of Tennessee's Alumni Memorial Gymnasium.
California	Barstow, Los Angeles, Livermore, San Francisco	February 6–7	Addressed troops at the Fort Irwin National Training Center. Attended a Republican Party fundraiser at the Century Plaza Hotel. Stayed at the JW Marriott hotel in Los Angeles. Toured Lawrence Livermore National Laboratory. Took questions from the Commonwealth Club of California at the Hilton San Francisco Union Square.
Nebraska	Omaha	February 7–8	Stayed at the Marriott hotel. Campaigned for Governor Kay Orr at Peony Park. Toured Strategic Air Command headquarters at Offutt Air Force Base.
Ohio	Columbus	February 8	Met with local Head Start volunteers at St. Aloysius Family Service Center. Attended an Ohio Republican Party fundraiser at the Hyatt Regency Columbus.
Colombia	Cartagena	February 15	Attended the Summit Meeting on the Control of Illicit Drug Trafficking with the president Virgilio Barco Vargas, Bolivian president Jaime Paz Zamora and Peruvian president Alan García Pérez.
Maryland	Baltimore	February 22	Attended a celebration of the centennial of the Johns Hopkins School of Medicine.
New York	New York	February 28	Campaigned for Susan Molinari for Congress at Shalimar Hall on Staten Island.
California	San Francisco, Los Angeles, Beverly Hills, Santa Ana, Palm Springs, Rancho Mirage, Palm Desert	February 28–March 4	Campaigned for Pete Wilson for governor at the City Club Library in San Francisco. Stayed at the Century Plaza Hotel in Los Angeles. Attended the dedication ceremony of the North County Correctional Facility. Addressed a Republican Governors Association luncheon at Jimmy's restaurant in Beverly Hills. Visited former president Ronald Reagan at Fox Plaza. Addressed the California Chamber of Commerce at the Century Plaza Hotel. Addressed the Academy of Television Arts & Sciences at the Century Plaza Hotel. Attended a "Drug Use is Life Abuse" rally at the Santa Ana Bowl. Hosted Japanese prime minister Toshiki Kaifu at Morningside Country Club in Palm Springs and at Sunnylands. Attended service at St. Margaret's Episcopal Church. Presented a donation to the United Negro College Fund at Sunnylands.

== March ==
No trips made

== April ==
State or country	Areas visited	Dates	Details
Georgia	Atlanta	April 2	Addressed the National Association of Broadcasters convention at Georgia World Congress Center.
Ohio	Evendale, Cincinnati	April 2–3	Toured the GE Aerospace plant. Campaigned for George Voinovich for governor at the Westin Hotel, where he stayed overnight. Visited Derrick Turnbow, a Taft High School student present at his January 12 visit who had since been paralyzed in a shooting, at the Drake Center in Hartwell.
Indiana	Indianapolis	April 3	Planted a tree, as part of a local "Trees for Tomorrow" initiative, at a spot near the City-County Building that has since been known as Presidential Place Park. Campaigned for Senator Dan Coats at the Indianapolis Convention Center.
Michigan	Dearborn	April 3	Attended a Republican fundraiser at the Ritz-Carlton Hotel.
Canada	Toronto	April 10	Informal meeting with Prime Minister Brian Mulroney.
United Kingdom	Hamilton, Bermuda	April 13–14	Informal meeting with Prime Minister Margaret Thatcher.
Florida	Key Largo	April 19–20	Hosted French president François Mitterrand at the Ocean Reef Club and at the homes of Carl Lindner Jr. and Richard T. Farmer.
Alabama	Birmingham	April 20	Campaigned for Bill Cabaniss for Senate at the Birmingham–Jefferson Civic Center. Presented a Point of Light award to the Birmingham–Southern College Conservancy. Signed Proclamation 6117, declaring National Recycling Month, at the Tutwiler Hotel.
Florida	Orlando, Islamorada	April 20–22	Toured SeaWorld Orlando, where he presented a Point of Light award to research biologist Daniel K. Odell. Stayed at the Tarpon Flats Inn. Toured Everglades National Park.

== May ==
State or country	Areas visited	Dates	Details
Oklahoma	Stillwater, Tulsa	May 4	Gave the commencement address at Oklahoma State University. Addressed the Oklahoma Foundation for Excellence Dinner at the Doubletree Hotel in Tulsa.
Texas	Kingsville	May 11	Gave the commencement address at Texas A&I University's Javelina Stadium.
South Carolina	Columbia	May 11–12	Campaigned for Governor Carroll A. Campbell Jr. at the South Carolina Governor's Mansion. Stayed at the Marriott hotel. Gave the commencement address at the University of South Carolina's Carolina Coliseum and visited Williams–Brice Stadium.
Virginia	Lynchburg	May 12	Gave the commencement address at Liberty University's Willard May Stadium.
Texas	Dallas, Houston, Livingston, Austin	May 18–20	Attended a Republican fundraiser at the Loews Anatole Hotel. Stayed at The Houstonian Hotel. Visited the Livingston Dam on the Trinity River, where severe flooding had recently taken place. Participated in the Doug Sanders Kingwood Celebrity Classic golf tournament at the Deerwood Country Club in Houston. Gave the commencement address at the University of Texas at Austin's Vernon F. "Doc" Neuhaus–Darrell K Royal Athletic Center. Attended service at St. Martin's Episcopal Church.
Oregon	Portland	May 20–21	Dedicated the Fallen Law Enforcement Officers Memorial at Veterans Memorial Coliseum. Attended a Republican fundraiser at the Hilton Portland Hotel, where he stayed overnight.
California	Los Angeles	May 21	Presented a Point of Light award to the Oakwood Beautification Committee. Attended a fundraiser at the home of David H. Murdock.

== June ==
State or country	Areas visited	Dates	Details
Wisconsin	Milwaukee	June 7	Campaigned for Governor Tommy Thompson at the Milwaukee Auditorium.
Illinois	Chicago	June 7	Visited a third-grade classroom at Farnsworth Elementary School. Campaigned for Jim Edgar for governor at the Hyatt Regency Chicago.
Iowa	Des Moines	June 7–8	Stayed at the Des Moines Marriott Hotel, where he campaigned for Governor Terry Branstad.
Nebraska	Omaha	June 8	Campaigned for Hal Daub for Senate at Peony Park. Visited the Men Against Destruction Defending Against Drugs and Social Disorder (MAD-DADS) Information Center.
Alabama	Huntsville	June 20	Campaigned for Governor H. Guy Hunt at the Von Braun Civic Center; Visited the Marshall Space Flight Center.

== July ==
State or country	Areas visited	Dates	Details
United Kingdom	London	July 5–6	Attended the 1990 London NATO summit.
Texas	Houston	July 6–11	Attended the 16th G7 summit at Rice University. Stayed at The Houstonian Hotel.
California	Anaheim, Yorba Linda	July 18–19	Stayed at the Hilton Anaheim. Attended the opening and dedication of the Richard Nixon Presidential Library and Museum.
Idaho	Boise	July 19	Met with Mayor Dirk Kempthorne's Drug Task Force at City Hall. Campaigned for Larry Craig for Senate at the Boise Convention Center.
Montana	Billings	July 19–20	Stayed at the Holiday Inn. Campaigned for Lieutenant Governor Allen Kolstad for Senate at the Billings Plaza Trade Center. Addressed an anti-drug rally at Daylis Stadium.
Wyoming	Cheyenne	July 20	Attended Cheyenne Frontier Days and a parade marking the 100th anniversary of Wyoming statehood. Toured Francis E. Warren Air Force Base.
Pennsylvania	Philadelphia	July 24	Attended a Republican fundraiser at the Wyndham Franklin Plaza Hotel. Addressed an anti-drug rally at the West Philadelphia Community Center.
New York	New York	July 24	Attended a Republican fundraiser at the Waldorf Astoria New York.

== August ==
State or country	Areas visited	Dates	Details
Colorado	Aspen	August 2	Met with British prime minister Margaret Thatcher at the home of U.S. ambassador to the U.K. Henry E. Catto Jr. Bush and Thatcher both addressed the Aspen Institute Symposium.
Maryland	Baltimore	August 20	Addressed the Veterans of Foreign Wars convention at Baltimore Arena.
Rhode Island	North Kingstown	August 20	Attended a Republican fundraiser at Quidnesset Country Club.
Maine	Falmouth	August 21	Participated in Governor John R. McKernan Jr.'s 1990 Golf Classic at Woodlands Country Club.

== September ==
State or country	Areas visited	Dates	Details
Kansas	Topeka	September 6	Campaigned for Governor Mike Hayden at the Kansas Expocentre.
Florida	Tallahassee	September 6	Visited the Florida Governor's Mansion. Campaigned for Representative Bill Grant at Tom Brown Park.
Finland	Helsinki	September 8–9	Attended the Helsinki Summit with Soviet president Mikhail Gorbachev. Issued joint statement on the Persian Gulf crisis. Also met with President Mauno Koivisto.
Colorado	Denver	September 18	Attended a Republican fundraiser at the Colorado Convention Center.
California	Los Angeles, San Francisco	September 18–19	Stayed at the Westin Bonaventure Hotel. Campaigned for Pete Wilson for governor there and at the Fairmont San Francisco.
Ohio	Akron	September 26	Campaigned for George Voinovich for governor at The Tangiers restaurant.
Illinois	Rosemont	September 26	Met with leaders of local European ethnic communities at the Hyatt Regency O'Hare. Campaigned for Lynn M. Martin for Senate at the Rosemont Horizon.
Minnesota	Minneapolis	September 26–27	Campaigned for Jon Grunseth for governor at the Hyatt Regency Minneapolis.
Ohio	Cleveland	September 27	Campaigned for George Voinovich for governor at the Stouffer Tower City Plaza Hotel.
Michigan	Detroit	September 27	Campaigned for Bill Schuette for Senate at the Westin Renaissance Center.
New York	New York	September 29–October 1	Addressed the opening session of the 45th United Nations General Assembly and the concurrent World Summit for Children at United Nations Headquarters. Stayed at the Waldorf Astoria. Attended service with British prime minister Margaret Thatcher at St. Bartholomew's Episcopal Church. Briefly returned to Washington to negotiate a continuing resolution to postpone the 1990 United States federal government shutdown, before returning to the Waldorf Astoria to sign the resolution. Addressed a ministerial meeting of the Conference on Security and Co-operation in Europe at the Javits Center.

== October ==
State or country	Areas visited	Dates	Details
North Carolina	Raleigh	October 10	Campaigned for Senator Jesse Helms at the Raleigh Civic Center.
Florida	St. Petersburg	October 10	Campaigned for Governor Bob Martinez at Vinoy Park and the St. Petersburg Hilton. Visited Al Lang Stadium.
Georgia	Atlanta	October 10	Campaigned for Johnny Isakson for governor at the Stouffer Waverly Hotel.
Texas	Dallas	October 15	Campaigned for Clayton Williams for governor at the Hyatt Regency Dallas.
Nebraska	Omaha	October 15	Attended a Republican fundraiser at the Red Lion Hotel.
Iowa	Des Moines	October 15–16	Stayed at the JW Marriott hotel. Attended Republican fundraisers at the State Historical Society of Iowa and at the Des Moines Civic Center.
Illinois	Glen Ellyn	October 16	Campaigned for Jim Edgar at the College of DuPage Fieldhouse, where he also presented the Presidential Citizens Medal to Tony Zale.
Michigan	Grand Rapids	October 16	Campaigned for John Engler for governor at the Amway Grand Plaza Hotel
Vermont	Burlington	October 23	Attended a Republican fundraiser at the Sheraton Burlington Hotel Conference Center.
New Hampshire	Manchester	October 23	Attended a Republican fundraiser at the Center of New Hampshire Holiday Inn.
Connecticut	Waterbury, Stamford	October 23	Campaigned for Gary Franks for Congress at the Sheraton hotel in Waterbury. Campaigned for Representative John G. Rowland for governor at the Radisson Tara Stamford Hotel.
California	Irvine, Los Angeles	October 25–26	Stayed at the Hyatt Regency Irvine. Campaigned for Pete Wilson for governor at the Century Plaza Hotel.
Hawaii	Honolulu	October 26–28	Campaigned for Representative Pat Saiki for Senate at the Hilton Hawaiian Village. Hosted the Pacific Island Nations-United States Summit at the East–West Center. Sailed on a catamaran at Sandy Point Coast Guard Station. Golfed with Fijian prime minister Kamisese Mara and Cook Islands prime minister Geoffrey Henry at Hickam Air Force Base.
California	San Francisco	October 28–29	Stayed at the Hyatt Regency San Francisco. Attended a California Republican Party fundraiser at the home of William Sprott Boyd.
Oklahoma	Oklahoma City	October 29	Campaigned for Bill Price for governor at the National Cowboy Hall of Fame and Western Heritage Center.

== November ==
State or country	Areas visited	Dates	Details
Massachusetts	Burlington, Mashpee	November 1	Attended a Republican fundraiser at the Burlington Marriott Hotel. Campaigned for Bill Weld for governor and Jim Rappaport for Senate at Mashpee Middle School.
Florida	Orlando	November 1	Campaigned for Governor Bob Martinez at the Orlando World Center Marriott.
Ohio	Cincinnati	November 1–2	Attended a Republican fundraiser at the Westin Hotel, where he stayed overnight. Visited a Frisch's restaurant.
Minnesota	Rochester	November 2	Attended a Republican fundraiser at John Marshall High School. Took a nap in a suite at the Kahler Hotel.
Iowa	Sioux City	November 2	Met with first responders to the crash of United Airlines Flight 232 in July 1989 at Sioux Gateway Airport. Campaigned for Representative Tom Tauke for Senate at the Sioux City Convention Center.
California	Thousand Oaks	November 2–3	Stayed at the Hyatt Westlake Plaza. Planted a tree in Kingsmen Park on the California Lutheran University campus. Campaigned for Pete Wilson for Governor at the California Lutheran University student union.
New Mexico	Albuquerque	November 3	Spoke at a Republican rally at Albuquerque International Sunport.
Texas	Houston, Tyler, Waco	November 3–6	Stayed at The Houstonian Hotel. Called prospective voters in the 1990 Texas gubernatorial election from a Republican phonebanking office in Uptown Houston. Spoke at Republican rallies at Tyler Junior College, the Waco Convention Center, and the Westin Galleria in Houston. Voted in the midterm election at The Forum at Memorial Woods.
Czechoslovakia	Prague	November 17	Attended ceremonies commemorating the first anniversary of the Velvet Revolution. Addressed the Federal Assembly.
Germany	Speyer, Ludwigshafen	November 18	Met with Chancellor Helmut Kohl.
France	Paris	November 18–21	Attended the CSCE Summit Meeting and the signing of the Treaty on Conventional Armed Forces in Europe.
Saudi Arabia	Jeddah, Dhahran	November 21–22	Met with King Fahd and the Emir of Kuwait. Addressed U.S. and British military personnel in eastern Saudi Arabia.
Egypt	Cairo	November 22–23	Discussed the Persian Gulf crisis with President Hosni Mubarak.
Switzerland	Geneva	November 23	Discussed the Persian Gulf crisis with Syrian president Hafez al-Assad.
Mexico	Monterrey, Agualeguas	November 26–27	State visit. met with President Carlos Salinas de Gortari.

== December ==
State or country	Areas visited	Dates	Details
Brazil	Brasília	December 3–4	Met with President Fernando Collor de Mello. Addressed a Joint Session of the Brazilian Congress.
Uruguay	Montevideo	December 4–5	Met with President Luis Alberto Lacalle. Addressed a Joint Session of the Uruguayan Congress.
Argentina	Buenos Aires	December 5–6	Met with President Carlos Menem. Addressed a Joint Session of the Argentinean Congress.
Chile	Santiago	December 6–7	Met with President Patricio Aylwin. Addressed a Joint Session of the Chilean Congress.
Venezuela	Caracas	December 7–8	Met with President Carlos Andrés Pérez.
