= Albert L. Smith Jr. =

American politician (1931–1997)

Albert Lee Smith Jr.
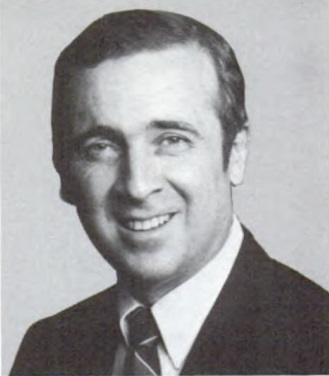

Member of the U.S. House of Representatives from Alabama's 6th district
- In office January 3, 1981 – January 3, 1983
- Preceded by: John Hall Buchanan, Jr.
- Succeeded by: Ben Erdreich

Personal details
- Born: August 31, 1931 Birmingham, Alabama, U.S.
- Died: August 12, 1997 (aged 65) Birmingham, Alabama, U.S.
- Resting place: Elmwood Cemetery in Birmingham
- Party: Republican
- Education: Auburn University
- Occupation: Insurance agent

Military service
- Branch/service: United States Navy

Albert Lee Smith Jr. (August 31, 1931 – August 12, 1997) was an American politician who represented the 6th district in the United States House of Representatives during the 97th Congress (1981–1983).

== Early life ==
Smith was born in 1931 in Birmingham, Alabama. He attended public schools in Jefferson County and graduated from Ramsay High School before he enrolled at Auburn University in Auburn, Alabama. He graduated from Auburn in 1954 with a bachelor of science in agriculture and was commissioned an ensign in the United States Navy He served from 1954 to 1956. He worked thereafter as an insurance agent before entering political life.

== Politics ==
Smith was elected as a delegate to the Republican National Convention in 1968, 1972, and 1984. In 1978, Smith challenged 7-term Republican John Hall Buchanan, Jr. in the primary for the Birmingham-based 6th District. Buchanan was one of the more moderate Republicans in the House, and Smith ran well to his right. Smith lost fairly handily, but took another run at Buchanan in 1980. With support from conservative Christian activists, Smith defeated Buchanan by a surprising 10-point margin. He then narrowly defeated Democrat Pete Clifford by three points.

Smith voted for president Ronald Reagan's Economic Recovery Tax Act of 1981.

Smith served only one term before being defeated by Democratic Jefferson County commissioner Ben Erdreich. To date, Smith is the last Republican congressman to be unseated by a Democrat in Alabama.

In 1984, Smith unsuccessfully ran for the United States Senate against incumbent Democrat Howell Heflin.

== Private life ==
With his wife Eunie, Smith had three children Karen, Albert Lee III, and Meg and six grandchildren Jackson, Reece, Cooper, Caroline, Ella Kate, and Audrey. In 2016, following the death of Phyllis Schlafly, his widow Eunie Smith became President of the conservative campaign group Eagle Forum.

== Later life ==
Smith remained active in a variety of conservative political causes until his death in 1997 at the age of sixty-five. He is buried at Elmwood Cemetery in Birmingham.

U.S. House of Representatives
Preceded by John Hall Buchanan Jr.	Member of the U.S. House of Representatives from Alabama's 6th congressional district 1981–1983	Succeeded by Ben Erdreich
Party political offices
Vacant Title last held by James D. Martin	Republican nominee for U.S. Senator from Alabama (Class 2); 1984	Succeeded by William J. Cabaniss
