= Jack Biddle =

Jack Biddle may refer to:

- Jack Biddle (politician) (1930–2024), American politician for the state of Alabama
- Jack and Ed Biddle, American prison escapees from the state of Pennsylvania
