= Lake Leon =

Lake Leon may refer to:

- Lake Leon (Texas)
- Lake Leon (Florida)
