= J. T. Waggoner =

American politician

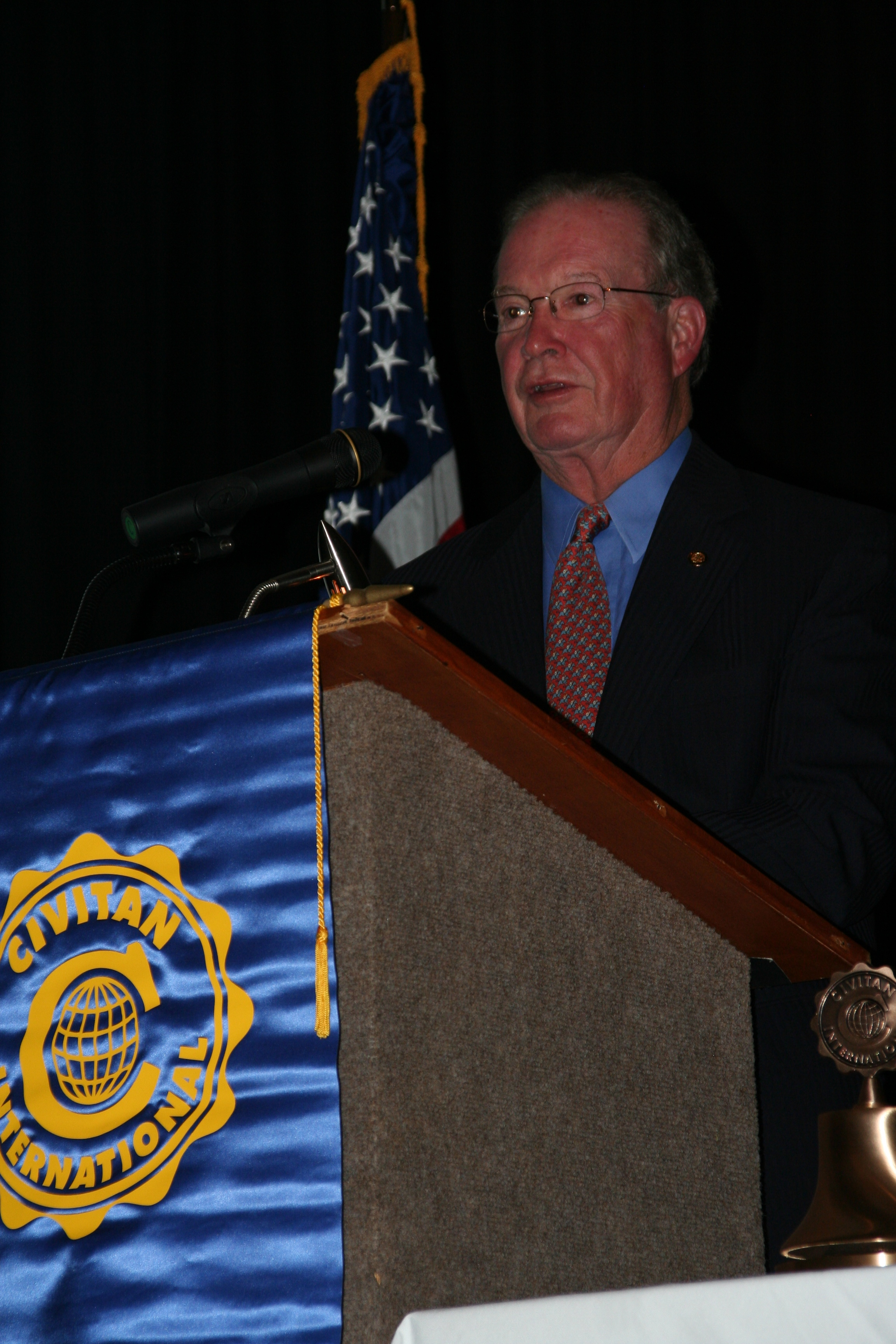

Majority Leader of the Alabama Senate
- In office November 3, 2010 – November 2014
- Preceded by: Zeb Little
- Succeeded by: Greg Reed

Member of the Alabama Senate from the 16th district
- Incumbent
- Assumed office November 7, 1990
- Preceded by: William Cabaniss

Member of the Alabama House of Representatives
- In office November 9, 1966 – November 9, 1983
- Succeeded by: Hoyt Trammell
- Constituency: 14th district (1966–1974); 51st district (1974–1983)

Personal details
- Born: James Thomas Waggoner Jr. January 8, 1937 (age 89) Birmingham, Alabama, U.S.
- Party: Republican (since 1984)
- Other political affiliations: Democratic (until 1984)
- Spouse: Marilyn Waggoner
- Education: Birmingham–Southern College; Birmingham School of Law

James Thomas "Jabo" Waggoner Jr. (born January 8, 1937) is an American politician who is a Republican member of the Alabama Senate, representing the 16th District since 1990. He received his B.A. from Birmingham Southern College and his J.D. from the Birmingham School of Law.

== Career ==
He assumed office in the Alabama State Senate in 1990. He was the Minority Leader from 1999 until the Republicans gained a legislative majority in November 2010 for the first time since Reconstruction, upon which he became the Majority Leader. He was a Democrat and a member of the Alabama House of Representatives from 1966 to 1983. He switched parties the following year to run unsuccessfully against U.S. Congressman Ben Erdreich in the Birmingham-based 6th district in 1984, receiving 40%.

In May 2019, he voted to make abortion a crime at any stage of a pregnancy, with no exemptions for cases of rape or incest.

In the State Legislature's 2021-2022 session, Waggoner was assigned to the following committees:

- Legislative Committee on Public Accounts
- Transportation Committee
- Banking and Insurance Committee
- Confirmations Committee, Vice Chair
- Finance and Taxation Education Committee
- Finance and Taxation General Fund Committee
- Local Legislation Jefferson County Committee, Chair
- Local Legislation Shelby County Committee
- Senate Rules Committee, Chair
