= 1970 Alabama Supreme Court election =

- May 5, 1970 (primary); November 3, 1970 (general)

Chief justice Democratic primary
- May 5, 1970
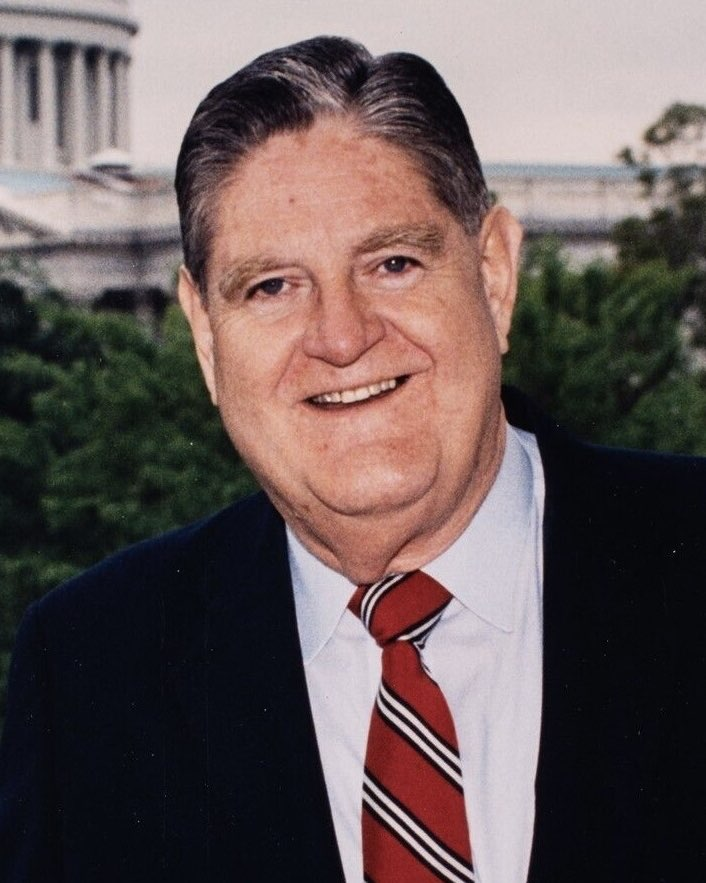

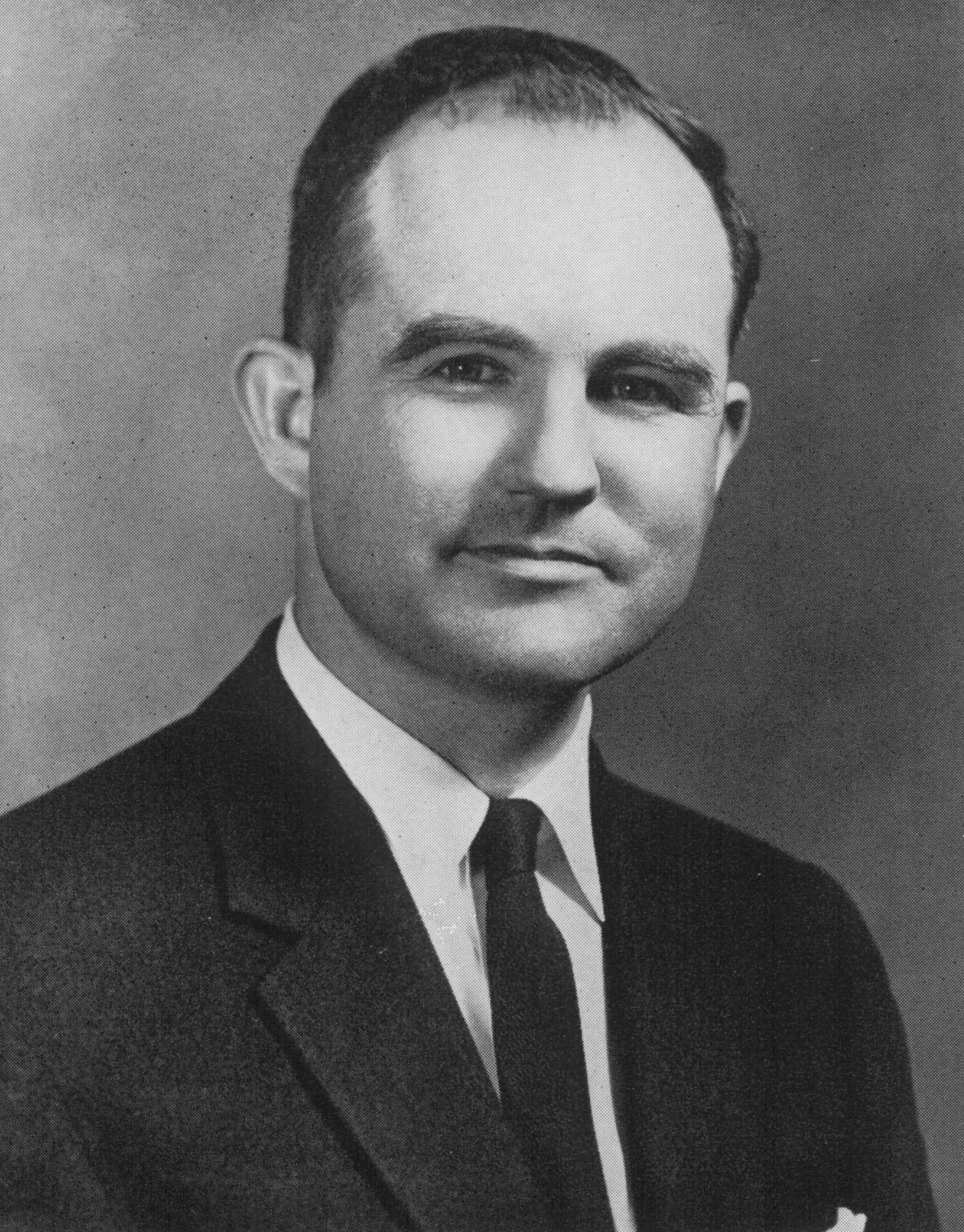
Candidate	Howell Heflin	John M. Patterson
Party	Democratic	Democratic
Popular vote	550,997	287,594
Percentage	65.71%	34.29%
- County results Heflin: 50–60% 60–70% 70–80% 80–90% >90% Patterson: 50–60% 60–70%

The 1970 Alabama Supreme Court election was held on November 3, 1970, to elect the Chief Justice of the Alabama Supreme Court.

== Democratic primary ==
=== Candidates ===
- Howell Heflin, law professor
- John Patterson, Governor of Alabama (1959–1963)

=== Results ===
Democratic primary
Party	Candidate	Votes	%
Democratic	Howell Heflin	550,997	65.71
Democratic	John Patterson	287,594	34.29
Total votes		838,591	100.00

== General election ==
=== Results ===
1970 Alabama Supreme Court chief justice election
Party	Candidate	Votes	%
Democratic	Howell Heflin	496,949	100.00
Total votes		496,949	100.00
