= 1984 United States Senate election in Alabama =

- November 6, 1984
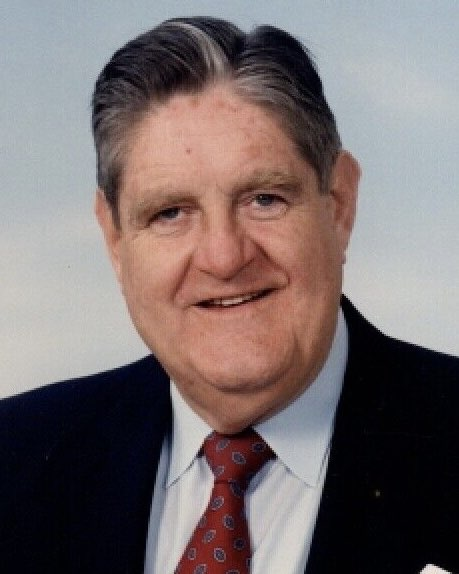

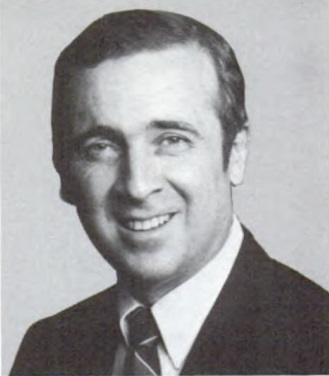
Nominee	Howell Heflin	Albert L. Smith Jr.
Party	Democratic	Republican
Popular vote	857,535	498,508
Percentage	62.68%	36.43%
- County results Heflin: 50–60% 60–70% 70–80% 80–90% Smith: 40–50% 50–60% 60–70%
U.S. senator before election
Howell Heflin
Democratic
Elected U.S. Senator
Howell Heflin
Democratic

Republican primary results by county Smith: 80–90%; 70–80%; 60–70%; 50–60%; 40–50%; 30–40%; Carter: 50–60%; 40–50%; 30–40%; Tie: 30–40%; No Vote

The 1984 United States Senate election in Alabama was held on November 6, 1984.

Incumbent Democratic Senator Howell Heflin was easily re-elected to a second term.

Heflin received 94% of the black vote.

== Democratic primary ==
=== Candidates ===
- Charles W. Borden, dentist
- Howell Heflin, incumbent U.S. Senator
- Margaret Stewart, perennial candidate

=== Results ===
Democratic primary results
Party	Candidate	Votes	%
Democratic	Howell Heflin (incumbent)	399,817	83.23%
Democratic	Charles W. Borden	47,463	9.88%
Democratic	Margaret Stewart	33,114	6.89%
Total votes		480,394	100.00%

== Republican primary ==
=== Candidates ===
- Doug Carter, Birmingham businessman
- Joseph Keith, Montgomery surgeon
- Albert L. Smith Jr., former U.S. Representative
- Clint Wilkes

=== Results ===
Republican primary results
Party	Candidate	Votes	%
Republican	Albert L. Smith Jr.	27,304	61.79%
Republican	Doug Carter	8,067	18.26%
Republican	Joseph Keith	5,171	11.70%
Republican	Clint Wilkes	3,644	8.25%
Total votes		44,186	100.00%

== General election ==
=== Results ===
General election results
Party	Candidate	Votes	%	±%
Democratic	Howell Heflin (incumbent)	857,535	62.68%	▼31.31
Republican	Albert L. Smith Jr.	498,508	36.43%	▲36.43
Libertarian	S. D. Davis	12,191	0.89%	▲0.89
Total votes		1,368,234	100.00%	N/A
Democratic hold				

== See also ==
- 1984 United States Senate elections

== Works cited ==
- Black, Earl; Black, Merle (1992). The Vital South: How Presidents Are Elected. Harvard University Press. ISBN 0674941306.
