= John H. Buchanan Jr. =

American politician (1928–2018)

John H. Buchanan
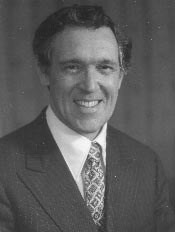

Member of the U.S. House of Representatives from Alabama's 6th district
- In office January 3, 1965 – January 3, 1981
- Preceded by: George Huddleston Jr. (redistricting)
- Succeeded by: Albert L. Smith Jr.

Personal details
- Born: John Hall Buchanan Jr. March 19, 1928 Paris, Tennessee, U.S.
- Died: March 5, 2018 (aged 89) Rockville, Maryland, U.S.
- Party: Republican
- Other political affiliations: Democratic
- Spouse: Betty Buchanan
- Children: 2
- Education: Samford University; University of Virginia; Southern Baptist Theological Seminary
- Occupation: Politician; clergyman

Military service
- Branch/service: United States Navy
- Years of service: 1945–1946

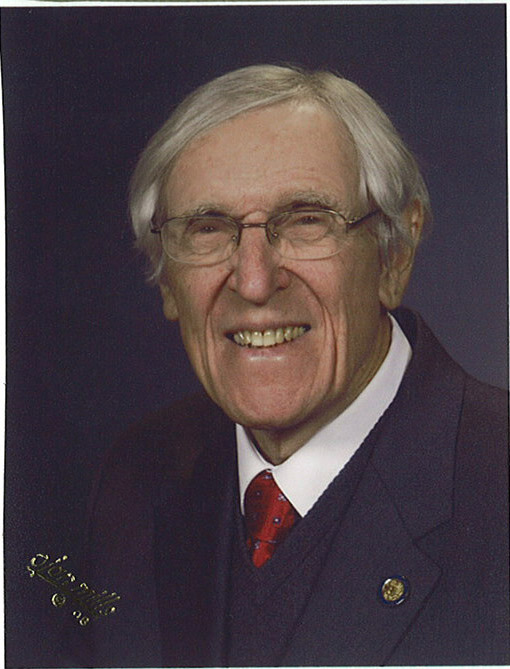
A more recent photo of Buchanan

John Hall Buchanan Jr. (March 19, 1928 – March 5, 2018) was an American military veteran, clergyman, and politician who served as a Republican in the U.S. House of Representatives from 1965 to 1981, representing Alabama's 6th congressional district. He was one of five Republicans elected to the House in 1964, the first Republicans elected to Congress in Alabama since the end of Reconstruction.

Initially an opponent of civil rights legislation like many southern politicians, he became an ardent supporter of civil rights in the 1970s. After his defeat by the more conservative Albert L. Smith Jr. in 1980 primary, would join the board of liberal group People for the American Way and would later join the Democratic Party.

== Early life ==
A native of Paris, Tennessee, Buchanan served in the United States Navy from 1945 to 1946 and then relocated to Alabama to attend Samford University in Birmingham. After his graduation in 1949, Buchanan did graduate work at the University of Virginia at Charlottesville, before he transferred to the Southern Baptist Theological Seminary in Louisville, Kentucky. In 1957, he graduated from the seminary and served as pastor of churches in Tennessee, Alabama, and Virginia.

== Early political campaigns ==
In 1962, Buchanan, while still an active pastor in Birmingham, was one of three unsuccessful Republican candidates for the U.S. House of Representatives. Alabama congressional candidates that year ran statewide. Because state law required that voters support eight candidates for their ballot to count, the Republicans had to back five Democrats, who were technically their at-large opponents, or to write in the names of five Republicans who were not official candidates, a process that proved too burdensome to overcome. The congressional race corresponded with the controversial admission of James Meredith, who became the first African American in history to graduate from the University of Mississippi in neighboring Mississippi. Buchanan said that the Alabama congressional delegation had responded to the desegregation crisis "only after intense pressure from the home folks. ... they nodded their heads 'yes' when the Kennedys asked them to, and have come back home and denied they were national Democrats." Buchanan led the GOP's three-candidate field in 1962 with 141,202 votes but failed to dislodge the eighth-place Democratic candidate, Representative Carl Elliott of Jasper.

Buchanan was also the finance director for the resurgent Alabama Republican Party. In 1964, he was handily elected to Congress from the Birmingham-based 6th district, having unseated the 10-year incumbent Democrat, George Huddleston Jr., by a 21-point margin. This was particularly surprising since the Republican Party had been more or less nonexistent in Alabama for the better part of 80 years. In fact, most of the 6th's living residents had never been represented by a Republican before. However, Alabama voters turned against the Democrats after Lyndon Johnson signed the Civil Rights Act of 1964 into law. Partly as a result, Barry Goldwater easily carried the district en route to winning 69% of Alabama's popular vote. Along with Jack Edwards, William L. Dickinson, Glenn Andrews, and James D. Martin, Buchanan was one of five Republicans elected in 1964, the first Republicans elected to Congress in the state since the end of Reconstruction.

== Congressional tenure ==
During the beginning of his career in the House of Representatives, Buchanan was a conservative Republican, opposing the creation of Medicare, the Voting Rights Act of 1965 and the Civil Rights Act of 1968, but also worked with Democratic Congressman and fellow Southerner Charles Weltner to spearhead an investigation of the Ku Klux Klan. Along with Weltner, the FBI credited Buchanan for bringing Klan membership to its lowest level since World War II.

However, Buchanan's social views would begin to change due to attending church services in Riverside Baptist Church, an integrated church in southwest Washington, D.C.. In an interview with the Washington Post in 1976, Buchanan explained his change on social views: "When you're deeply involved in a biracial entity, you think of people as brothers and sisters." Buchanan would also hire African-Americans for his staff and was the first member of the Alabama congressional delegation to nominate African-American candidates to the military service academies.

As a senior member of the House Committee on Education and Labor, Buchanan helped lead the fight in 1972 in the House for enactment of the Education Act, Title IX, which requires equality for women in the programs of American colleges and universities, including athletics. He served as ranking Republican on the Equal Rights Subcommittee and the subcommittee with jurisdiction over the arts. For fourteen years, he was a member of the Foreign Affairs Committee, where he championed the rights of people behind the Iron Curtain, especially Jewish and Christian dissidents, as well as the black majorities in Southern Rhodesia and South Africa. As ranking minority member of the House Committee on Foreign Affairs Subcommittee on International Operations, he was one of the principal authors of the Foreign Service Act of 1980. In that year he received the Honor Award, Women's Action Organization (State Department, ICA, AID) and the Honor Award "for commitment to the advancement of women in the Foreign Service community". Originally opposed to busing during the Nixon administration, Buchanan would eventually come to support it in order to combat segregation in the Carter administration. He would also become a supporter of abortion rights. Buchanan, alongside fellow centrist Republicans Alphonzo E. Bell Jr. and John B. Anderson, also supported the creation of a Martin Luther King, Jr. statue in the Capitol.

He served as a member of the U. S. delegation to the 28th United Nations General Assembly, and to the Sixth Special Assembly, having ambassadorial rank with each appointment. He was a member of the U. S. delegation to the U. N. Human Rights Commission (1978–1980), was ranking Republican to the Commission on Security and Cooperation in Europe, and was a member of the U.S. Delegation to the Belgrade Conference on the Helsinki Accords. Largely due to his liberal record and support of civil rights, Buchanan became very popular in his district, even though Democrats continued to hold most local offices in the district well into the 1980s. He was reelected seven times, rarely facing serious opposition. In 1978, however, he was challenged in the primary by a considerably more conservative Republican, Albert L. Smith Jr., a longtime party activist in the Birmingham area. Buchanan fended him off that year, but was defeated in a rematch in 1980.

Auburn University historian Wayne Flynt described Buchanan as a "centrist in an age where centrism was beginning to be challenged and would finally result in the polarization of American politics into left and right." Despite being to Buchanan's right, Barry Goldwater would support him in his reelection campaigns during the 1970s, and referred to Buchanan as a "fine progressive Republican." His daughter Lynn noted that in his later years, Buchanan did not relate to modern-day Republican values, and had switched to the Democratic Party.

== Affiliations ==
Upon leaving Congress in 1981, he was appointed by President Ronald W. Reagan as a member of the U.S. delegation to the United Nations. He has also served on the United Nations Human Rights Committee. Buchanan was also on the board of directors of the liberal group, People for the American Way, founded by producer Norman Lear. For many years, he served as PFAW's national chairman. Buchanan supported Bill Clinton in the 1992 presidential election.

In that capacity, he traveled extensively, participating in frequent debates with leaders of the Religious Right on radio, television, and various platforms throughout the United States. Appearances in the media included McNeil-Lehrer NewsHour, Crossfire, Larry King Live, Charlie Rose, and other news programs. He also spoke extensively for national organizations including the Council for the Advancement of Citizenship, the Kettering Foundation, and the Close-Up Foundation.

Buchanan's numerous awards have included the National Council of Jewish Women Hannah G. Solomon Award, the Common Cause Public Service Achievement Award, the National Conference of Christians and Jews Brotherhood Award, and an award from the Self-Determination for D. C. National Coalition. He served on the Common Cause President's Council, the National Council of the U.S. United Nations Association, and the Board of Advisors and Speakers Bureau of the Close-Up Foundation. He also served as the board chairman of Fund-Balance, LLC and the Nexus Holdings Group.

In 2010, Buchanan was inducted into the Alabama Academy of Honor for his congressional contributions to furthering the rights of women and African Americans. After his defeat, Buchanan never returned to Alabama and he lived in Bethesda, Maryland. He and his wife Betty have two daughters and three granddaughters.

== Death ==
Buchanan died on March 5, 2018, in an assisted living center in Rockville, Maryland, from dementia. Al Quie, Republican representative and governor of Minnesota who served with Buchanan, said of him: "There was a basic goodness, solidness, that didn't take long to recognize and respect."

== See also ==
- List of members of the House Un-American Activities Committee

U.S. House of Representatives
Preceded by George Huddleston Jr.	Member of the U.S. House of Representatives from Alabama's 6th congressional district 1965–1981	Succeeded by Albert L. Smith Jr.
