= Alabama's 17th Senate district =

Alabama's 17th State Senate district
Senator
Shay Shelnutt; R–Trussville
- Demographics: 83.6% White; 7.8% Black; 4.7% Hispanic; 0.7% Asian
- Population (2022): 134,231

Alabama's 17th Senate district is one of 35 districts in the Alabama Senate. The district has been represented by Shay Shelnutt since 2014.

== Geography ==
Election	Map	Counties in District
2026; 2022		Portions of Blount, Jefferson, St. Clair
2018		Portions of Blount, Jefferson, St. Clair
2014		Portions of Blount, Jefferson, St. Clair, Talladega
2010; 2006; 2002		Portions of Blount, Jefferson, St. Clair

== Election history ==
=== Elections in the 2020s ===
Alabama Senate election, 2022: Senate District 17
Party	Candidate	Votes	%	±%
Republican	Shay Shelnutt (Incumbent)	38,137	90.95	−7.36
Libertarian	John Fortenberry	3,675	8.76	+8.76
Write-in		122	0.29	-1.40
Majority		34,462	82.18	−14.43
Turnout		41,934		
Republican hold				

=== Elections in the 2010s ===
Alabama Senate election, 2018: Senate District 17
Party	Candidate	Votes	%	±%
Republican	Shay Shelnutt (Incumbent)	45,964	98.31	−0.54
Write-in		792	1.69	+0.54
Majority		45,172	96.61	−1.08
Turnout		46,756		
Republican hold				

Alabama Senate election, 2014: Senate District 17
Party	Candidate	Votes	%	±%
Republican	Shay Shelnutt	31,105	98.85	+17.74
Write-in		363	1.15	+1.03
Majority		30,742	97.69	
Turnout		31,468		
Republican hold				

Alabama Senate election, 2010: Senate District 17
Party	Candidate	Votes	%	±%
Republican	Scott Beason (Incumbent)	38,777	81.11	−17.68
Democratic	T. E. "Tommy" Hudson	8,973	18.77	+18.77
Write-in		55	0.12	-1.09
Majority		29,804	62.34	−35.24
Turnout		47,805		
Republican hold				

=== Elections in the 2000s ===
Alabama Senate election, 2006: Senate District 17
Party	Candidate	Votes	%	±%
Republican	Scott Beason	30,446	98.79	+14.87
Write-in		373	1.21	+0.78
Majority		30,073	97.58	
Turnout		30,819		
Republican hold				

Alabama Senate election, 2002: Senate District 17
Party	Candidate	Votes	%	±%
Republican	Jack Biddle (Incumbent)	30,478	83.92	−14.95
Libertarian	Caroline Moore	5,685	15.65	+15.65
Write-in		155	0.43	-0.70
Majority		24,793	68.27	−29.47
Turnout		36,318		
Republican hold				

=== Elections in the 1990s ===
Alabama Senate election, 1998: Senate District 17
Party	Candidate	Votes	%	±%
Republican	Jack Biddle (Incumbent)	33,233	98.87	−0.09
Write-in		379	1.13	+0.09
Majority		32,854	97.74	−0.18
Turnout		33,612		
Republican hold				

Alabama Senate election, 1994: Senate District 17
Party	Candidate	Votes	%	±%
Republican	Jack Biddle	28,720	98.96	+62.79
Write-in		302	1.04	+0.89
Majority		28,418	97.92	+70.41
Turnout		29,022		
Republican gain from Democratic				

Alabama Senate election, 1990: Senate District 17
Party	Candidate	Votes	%	±%
Democratic	Mac Parsons (Incumbent)	22,374	63.68	−36.32
Republican	Glenn Wadsworth	12,709	36.17	+36.17
Write-in		50	0.15	+0.15
Majority		9,665	27.51	−72.49
Turnout		35,133		
Democratic hold				

=== Elections in the 1980s ===
Alabama Senate election, 1986: Senate District 17
Party	Candidate	Votes	%	±%
Democratic	Mac Parsons (Incumbent)	24,119	100.00	+42.31
Majority		24,119	100.00	+84.63
Turnout		24,119		
Democratic hold				

Alabama Senate election, 1983: Senate District 17
Party	Candidate	Votes	%	±%
Democratic	Mac Parsons	8,844	57.69	+24.02
Independent	Tom Gloor	6,487	42.31	+42.31
Majority		2,357	15.37	−17.28
Turnout		15,331		
Democratic gain from Republican				

Alabama Senate election, 1982: Senate District 17
Party	Candidate	Votes	%	±%
Republican	Spencer Bachus	23,543	66.33	
Democratic	Dale Corley	11,953	33.67	
Majority		11,590	32.65	
Turnout		35,496		
Republican gain from Democratic				

== District officeholders ==
Senators take office at midnight on the day of their election.

- Shay Shelnutt (2014–present)
- Scott Beason (2006–2014)
- Jack Biddle (1994–2006)
- Mac Parsons (1983–1994)
- Spencer Bachus (1982–1983)
- Doug Cook (1978–1982)
- Eddie Hubert Gilmore (1974–1978)
- Don Horne (1970–1974)
- C. C. Torbert Jr. (1966–1970)
- H. B. Taylor (1962–1966)
- R. G. Kendall (1958–1962)
- Tully A. Goodwin (1954–1958)
