= Spencer Bachus =

American politician (born 1947)

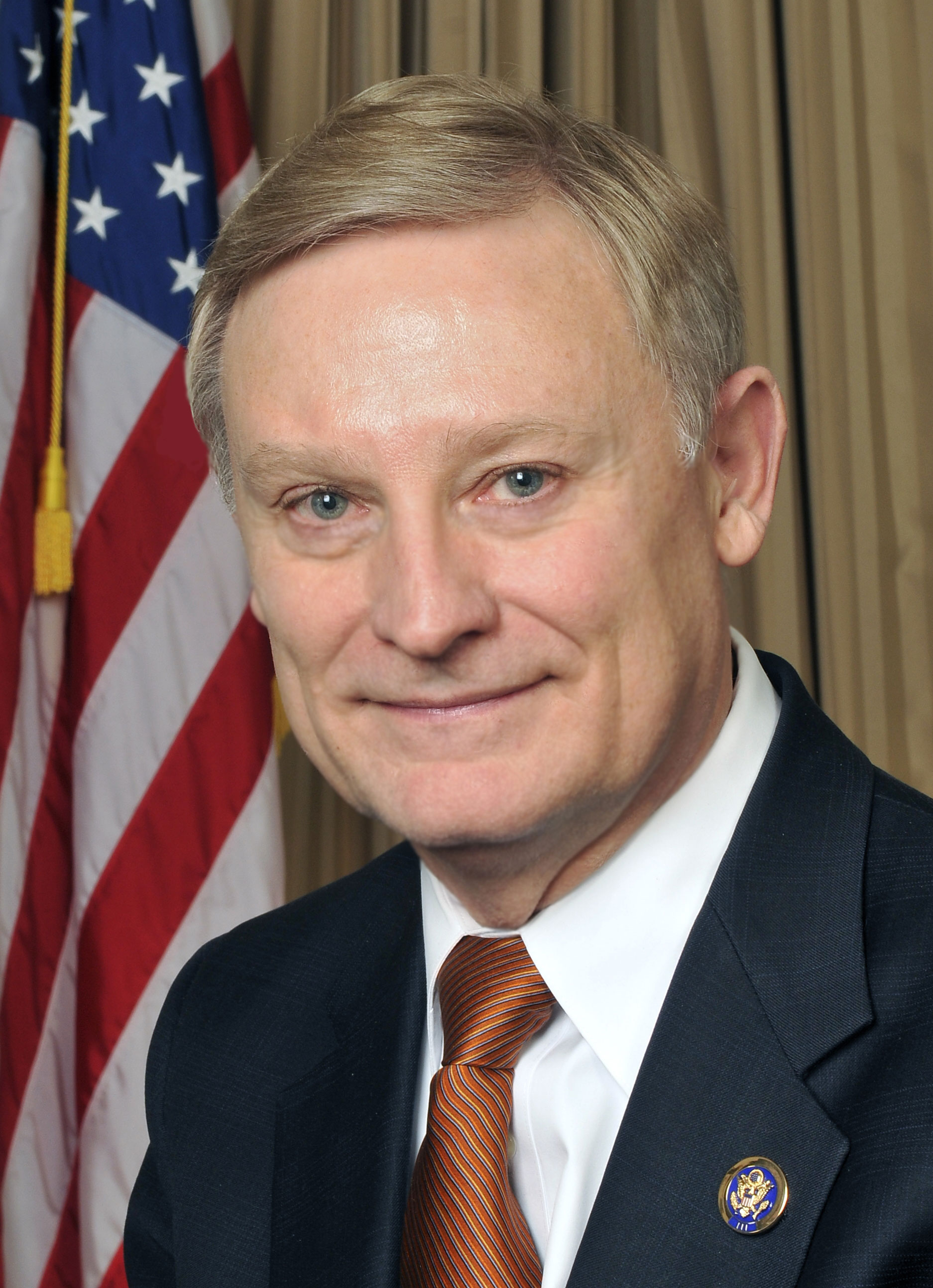

Acting President and Chair of the Export–Import Bank of the United States
- In office January 30, 2025 – February 28, 2025
- President: Donald Trump
- Preceded by: Reta Jo Lewis
- Succeeded by: James Cruse (acting)

Chair of the House Financial Services Committee
- In office January 3, 2011 – January 3, 2013
- Preceded by: Barney Frank
- Succeeded by: Jeb Hensarling

Ranking Member of the House Financial Services Committee
- In office January 3, 2007 – January 3, 2011
- Preceded by: Barney Frank
- Succeeded by: Barney Frank

Member of the U.S. House of Representatives from Alabama's 6th district
- In office January 3, 1993 – January 3, 2015
- Preceded by: Ben Erdreich
- Succeeded by: Gary Palmer

Chair of the Alabama Republican Party
- In office 1991–1992
- Preceded by: Elbert Peters
- Succeeded by: Elbert Peters

Member of the Alabama State Board of Education from the 6th District
- In office January 3, 1987 – January 3, 1991
- Preceded by: Howard Martin
- Succeeded by: Bettye Fine Collins

Member of the Alabama House of Representatives from the 46th district
- In office January 3, 1984 – January 3, 1987
- Preceded by: Bryant Melton
- Succeeded by: William Slaughter

Member of the Alabama Senate from the 17th district
- In office January 3, 1983 – January 3, 1984
- Preceded by: Doug Cook
- Succeeded by: Mac Parsons

Personal details
- Born: Spencer Thomas Bachus III; December 28, 1947 (age 78) Birmingham, Alabama, U.S.
- Party: Republican
- Spouse: Linda Bachus
- Children: 5
- Education: Auburn University (BA); University of Alabama (JD)

Military service
- Branch/service: United States Army
- Years of service: 1969–1971
- Unit: Alabama Army National Guard
- Bachus's voice Bachus on bipartisan securities trading legislation. Recorded November 2, 2011

Spencer Thomas Bachus III /ˈbækəs/ (born December 28, 1947) is an American politician. He is a former U.S. representative for the state of Alabama, serving from 1993 to 2015. A member of the Republican Party, he served as ranking member (2007–2011) and chairman (2011–2013) of the House Financial Services Committee. On September 30, 2013, Bachus announced his retirement from Congress. His term ended in 2015.

Born and raised in Birmingham, Bachus graduated from Auburn University and the University of Alabama Law School. He served in the Alabama National Guard before being elected to the Alabama State School Board in 1986 and holding the position of Alabama Republican Party Chairman in 1991. He was elected to the U.S. House of Representatives in 1992, and was re-elected by wide margins. From 2006 to 2012, Bachus was the leading Republican on the House Financial Services Committee, serving as committee chairman when his party held a House majority during the 112th Congress. Due to House Republican term limits on committee leadership positions, Bachus was succeeded by Congressman Jeb Hensarling in 2013.

== Early life, education, and career ==
Bachus was born in Birmingham, Alabama, the son of Edith (née Wells) and Jim Bachus Jr. He graduated from Auburn University in 1969 where he became a member of the Phi Kappa Tau fraternity. He served in the Alabama National Guard from 1969 to 1971, during the Vietnam War, while attending law school; Bachus earned a Juris Doctor degree from the University of Alabama Law School in 1972. Prior to his political career, he owned a sawmill and practiced law until 1992.

== State politics ==
In 1982, Bachus was elected to the Alabama Senate. Because new legislative elections were scheduled for 1983, he served only one year. In 1983 he was elected to the Alabama House of Representatives. In 1986, he was elected as the first Republican to the Alabama State Board of Education, serving one four-year term representing the 6th District. In 1990, he ran unsuccessfully for Attorney General of Alabama. In 1991, he became Chairman of the Alabama Republican Party, serving in that position until his campaign for Congress.

== U.S. House of Representatives ==
=== Summary ===
From 2006 to 2012, Bachus was the leading Republican on the House Financial Services Committee, serving as committee chairman when his party held a House majority during the 112th Congress. Due to House Republican term limits on committee leadership positions, Bachus was named Chairman Emeritus of the Financial Services Committee and rejoined the Judiciary Committee, which he had to take leave of when named Financial Services Chair.

On September 30, 2013, Bachus announced his retirement from Congress. His term ended in January 2015.

Upon his retirement in 2014, Norman Ornstein wrote a column in the National Journal lamenting the "Exodus of Problem Solvers on Capitol Hill."

=== Elections ===
Alabama's 6th congressional district was redistricted based on the 1990 United States census. In the 1992 election, Bachus defeated incumbent Democrat Ben Erdreich. Bachus was endorsed by The Birmingham News. Bachus got a major assist from redistricting, which drew most of Birmingham's black neighborhoods into the majority-black 7th district, replacing them with suburban and Republican territory around Birmingham and Tuscaloosa. The new 6th was almost 97 percent white; in contrast, the old 6th was 35 percent black. Despite being outspent almost 2 to 1, the 7th's more Republican bent was enough to give Bachus the victory by seven points. He was undoubtedly helped by George H. W. Bush winning the district by over 30 points.

Bachus would never face another contest nearly that close. No Democrat even filed from 2000 to 2010; before then, he defeated three nominal Democratic challengers with over 70 percent of the vote each time.

In the 2004 Republican primary, Bachus defeated Phillip Jauregui, a member of former Alabama Chief Justice Roy Moore's legal team. Bachus was unopposed in the 2004 general election.

In the 2010 midterm elections, Bachus easily turned back a challenge from pastor Stan Cooke in the Republican primary, winning 75% of the vote.

Bachus sought reelection in 2012 after the 6th was redrawn to cut out its share of Tuscaloosa. In the Republican primary, he drew three challengers, most notably State Senator Scott Beason. Beason ran well to Bachus's right and called for "true conservative leadership." Bachus heavily outspent him. The incumbent spent over $1.5 million, outspending Beason 45–1. Bachus defeated him 59%–27%. He won every county in the district except for Blount County.

For the first time since 1998, Bachus faced a Democratic challenger. Colonel Penny Bailey defeated William Barnes to become the Democratic nominee. However, the new 6th was as heavily Republican as its predecessor, and Bachus turned back this challenge fairly easily, defeating Bailey with 71 percent of the vote.

=== Tenure ===
Bachus had a conservative voting record, with a lifetime rating of 92 from the American Conservative Union. He was a signer of Americans for Tax Reform's Taxpayer Protection Pledge.

Bachus was an active legislator, engaged in many important issues over the course of his congressional career. He helped amend the Fair Credit Reporting Act to curtail identity theft and ease consumer access to their credit reports. Bachus also had a reputation for good constituent service.

1990s

In the late 1990s, during his tenure as Chairman of the Banking Oversight Committee, he uncovered the Community Development Financial Institute (CDFI), which led to the resignation of the top two CDFI officials.

In the 1990s he became an advocate of international debt relief for the Third World, and joined a broad coalition of activists in a one-day fast to demand action, which was ultimately successful. He criticized the Bush administration over negotiations with the genocidal regime in Sudan, and urged Bush to stop payment of oil revenues to the Sudanese government. Bachus was credited when the Bush Administration decided, in 2007, to place sanctions on Sudan.

In 1995, Bachus pushed for the creation of the Alabama National Cemetery, a United States National Cemetery located in Montevallo, Alabama. Bachus said, "The Alabama National Cemetery will always be the thing I'm most proud of.... It was the second one built, and I'm so thankful for it. We now (have) veterans from every war buried there."

On November 4, 1999, Bachus voted in favor of the Gramm–Leach–Bliley Act. This law repealed part of the Glass–Steagall Act of 1933, removing barriers in the market among banking companies, securities companies and insurance companies that prohibited any one institution from acting as any combination of an investment bank, a commercial bank, and an insurance company. With the passage of the Gramm–Leach–Bliley Act, commercial banks, investment banks, securities firms, and insurance companies were allowed to consolidate. The legislation was signed into law by President Bill Clinton.

2000s

While Bachus was Chairman of the Subcommittee on Financial Institutions and Consumer Credit (2001 – 2006), the House of Representatives passed and the President signed into law the Fair and Accurate Credit Transactions Act of 2003 (P.L. 108-159), which contained the strongest federal identity theft protections enacted into law to that date and entitled consumers to annual free credit reports from each of three major credit bureaus.

Additionally, while Bachus was Subcommittee Chairman, enacted into law was The Check Clearing for the 21st Century (CHECK) Act of 2003 (P.L. 108-100). This law authorized the use of digital versions of paper checks for transfer by financial institutions, saving money and eliminating delays and losses caused by the transportation of physical checks.

Again, as Subcommittee Chairman, Bachus played a leading role in passing the Federal Deposit Insurance Reform Conforming Amendments Act of 2005 (P.L. 109-173), which reformed the federal deposit insurance system and raised the FDIC coverage limit for retirement accounts to $250,000.

On July 26, 2002, he voted for the Homeland Security Act of 2002 which created the United States Department of Homeland Security.

Bachus also was active in advancing the search for Natalee Holloway, who went missing while on a senior trip to Aruba. Holloway attended high school in Mountain Brook, an affluent Birmingham suburb in the congressman's district.

In 2005, Bill Maher commented about the Army missing its recruiting goal by 42% in April, saying, "More people joined the Michael Jackson fan club. We've done picked all the low-lying Lynndie England fruit, and now we need warm bodies." Bachus responded to Maher's comments, saying "I think it borders on treason. In treason, one definition is to undermine the effort or national security of our country."

On December 14, 2005, he voted for the reauthorization of the USA Patriot Act. The USA PATRIOT Act is an act of Congress that was signed into law by President George W. Bush on October 26, 2001. On May 26, 2011, President Barack Obama signed the PATRIOT Sunsets Extension Act of 2011.

In 2006, he cosponsored H.R. 4411, the Goodlatte-Leach Internet Gambling Prohibition Act and H.R. 4777, the Internet Gambling Prohibition Act. In 2008, he opposed H.R. 5767, the Payment Systems Protection Act (a bill that sought to place a moratorium on enforcement of the Unlawful Internet Gambling Enforcement Act while the U.S. Treasury Department and the Federal Reserve defined "unlawful Internet gambling").

In 2006, as Chairman of the Subcommittee on Financial Institutions and Consumer Credit, Bachus worked on bipartisan draft subprime mortgage reform legislation to address abuses in the lending market. According to the book Act of Congress by Robert G. Kaiser, "Bachus thought that if it had passed in 2005, subprime lending would have dried up, and the Great Crash could have been avoided or at least made much less serious."

In 2008, Bachus proposed the Secure and Fair Enforcement for Mortgage Licensing, an addition to the Housing and Economic Recovery Act of 2008 that required licensing for mortgage brokers.

During deliberations on the legislative response to the 2008 financial crisis, Bachus, as Ranking Member on the Financial Services Committee, was one of the original proponents of the Capital Purchase Program (CPP) that the U.S. Treasury eventually adopted as the primary method of stabilizing the U.S. banking system.

As described in Robert G. Kaiser's book Act of Congress:

Spencer Bachus...had another idea. Instead of the complicated plan for auctioning off toxic assets, why not just inject capital directly into the troubled banks by buying their shares? This had been done successfully in similar situations, in Sweden, for example, in a banking crisis there in 1992...Bachus and [Senior Aide Larry] Lavender had been discussing the possibility for months as they watched the American crisis unfold, and Bachus asked about it now.

Paulson shot it down....

(Months later) Paulson asked his staff to figure out how to do what Spencer Bachus had suggested on September 18 – use government money to invest directly in troubled banks.

At a forum entitled Five Years Later: A Financial Crisis Symposium co-hosted by the University of Chicago and the Paulson Institute on October 29, 2013, former Financial Services Chairman Barney Frank stated, "Spencer Bachus gets some credit for this. In the meeting, he was the senior Republican, the leader of the Republican minority at the time, and when it was presented as buying up the assets, he was one of the first in our meetings to raise the notion of, well, how about a capital injection."

The capital purchase provision was included in the Emergency Economic Stabilization Act signed into law by President George W. Bush on October 3, 2008. According to the U.S. Treasury, in exchange for the capital funding made available to participating institutions, "Treasury received stock or debt securities in exchange for those investments. Most financial institutions participating in CPP pay Treasury a five percent dividend on preferred shares for the first five years and a nine percent rate thereafter. In addition, Treasury received warrants to purchase common shares or other securities from the banks at a time of the CPP investment. The purpose of the additional securities was to enable taxpayers to recap additional returns on their investments as banks recover."

On April 9, 2009, Bachus said "Some of the men and women I work with in Congress are socialists," later stating that 17 members of the House of Representatives are socialists.

2010s

In a 2010 interview with the Birmingham News, Bachus spoke about the outlook he would bring to his chairmanship of the Financial Services Committee, saying "In Washington, the view is that the banks are to be regulated, and my view is that Washington and the regulators are there to serve the banks." The comment was criticized in a blog post by ThinkProgress.

On November 4, 2010, while in the midst of a battle for the chairmanship of the House Financial Services Committee with Rep. Ed Royce (R-CA) and immediately following the 2010 general election, Bachus told the South Shelby (Ala.) Chamber of Commerce that former Alaska Governor Sarah Palin and candidates she endorsed cost the Republican Party control of the U.S. Senate, saying: "The Senate would be Republican today except for states (in which Gov. Palin endorsed candidates) like Christine O'Donnell in Delaware. Sarah Palin cost us control of the Senate." He went on to say that Tea Party candidates did well in U.S. House races, but in the U.S. Senate races, "they didn't do well at all."

Conservative commentator Hugh Hewitt and Senator James Inhofe (R-OK) immediately defended both Sarah Palin and the Tea Party movement, crediting them with gains in both the House and the Senate. Hewitt and Muny further demanded that Bachus not be awarded chairmanship of the House Financial Services Committee. Palin responded with criticism of the "Bachus bigger government agenda," citing Bachus's support for the Troubled Asset Relief Program and "Cash for Clunkers."

In 2010, Bachus stated that "ending the bailout of Fannie [Mae] and Freddie [Mac]" was his top priority as Chairman of the Financial Services Committee. He said that "using taxpayer money to subsidize the mortgage market is an addiction" and that "House Republicans want to reform the housing finance system in a way that does not rely on government guarantees, that does not make private investors and creditors wealthy while saddling taxpayers with losses, and that does not set the stage for the next financial crisis."

In 2011, the FBI and American Football Coaches Association honored Bachus for his advocacy and support for the National Child Identification Program. The National Child Identification Program tries to help combat cases of missing or abducted children by providing identification kits to parents that allow the parents or other guardians to keep their children's fingerprints and other identifying characteristics on file at their home.

In 2012, Bachus called on Veterans Affairs Secretary Eric Shinseki to speed up veterans claims processing. In a letter to the Secretary, Bachus wrote that the benefit claims backlog facing veterans nationwide is causing veterans to face growing debt or postpone plans to pursue college education. He demanded that the Department outline the specific steps being taken to reduce the backlog.

In 2013, Bachus was the only member of Alabama's congressional delegation to vote in favor of defunding the National Security Agency's collection of phone records. Bachus has been an outspoken critic of the NSA program since news of it was leaked by Edward Snowden.

Bachus was a lead House sponsor of legislation offering federal protection to the American flag, prohibiting its desecration. On Flag Day 2013, he joined Rep. Daniel Lipinski (D-IL) to co-sponsor an amendment to the U.S. Constitution that says "Congress shall have power to prohibit the physical desecration of the flag of the United States."

Bachus was credited with being a lead advocate for locating and maintaining the National Computer Forensics Institute in the City of Hoover Public Safety Building in Hoover, Alabama: "The National Computer Forensics Institute was created in 2007 with money from local, state and federal entities. Since opening in 2008, it has trained 932 state and local law enforcement officers from more than 300 agencies in all 50 states, according to congressional testimony from Pablo Martinez, deputy special agent in charge of the criminal investigation division, cyber crimes operations for the U.S. Secret Service."

In a May 2013 report, the Government Accountability Office stated, "As of March 31, 2013, the U.S. Department of the Treasury had received about $222 billion from its Capital Purchase Program investments, exceeding the approximately $205 billion it had disbursed. Treasury estimated at the end of December 2012 that CPP would have an approximate lifetime income of $15 billion after all institutions had exited the program."

=== Insider trading accusations ===
In 2007, Bachus was accused of insider trading. The Congressional Ethics inquiry stemmed from an allegation by Peter Schweizer and later reported by 60 Minutes that Bachus made trades with a number of short-term stock options, betting that stocks would fall, after receiving sensitive non-public information on the state of the economy. Schweizer claimed that from July through November 2008, Bachus traded in options at least forty times. During this period, Bachus was one of the congressional leaders getting private briefings from Secretary of the Treasury Hank Paulson and Federal Reserve Bank Chairman Ben Bernanke about the worsening financial crisis. Bachus said that he "never trades on non public information, or financial services stocks". He was subsequently cleared by the Office of Congressional Ethics, which on April 30, 2012, the announced that they had found no evidence of violations of insider-trading rules and recommended that the case against him be closed. Roderick Hills and Harvey Pitt, former Chairmen of the Securities and Exchange Commission who reviewed the accusations, wrote "the original source for these allegations was a sensational, but factually inaccurate, book, followed by an adulatory (but equally inaccurate) '60 Minutes' segment about it. The allegations in the book, vis-à-vis Mr. Bachus, are inaccurate; far worse, however, is that these allegations are laughable to serious students of insider trading law."

=== Committee assignments ===
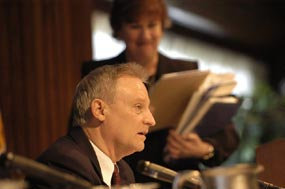
Spencer Bachus as Chair of the House Financial Services Committee

- Committee on Financial Services (Chair Emeritus)
- Committee on the Judiciary
  - Subcommittee on Regulatory Reform, Commercial, and Antitrust Law. (Chair)
  - Subcommittee on Crime, Terrorism, Homeland Security, and Investigations.

=== Caucus memberships ===
- Congressional Biomedical Research Caucus
- Congressional Caucus on Turkey and Turkish Americans
- Congressional Cement Caucus
- Congressional China Caucus
- Congressional Constitution Caucus
- Congressional Fire Services Caucus
- Congressional Immigration Reform Caucus
- Congressional Steel Caucus
- Friends of Switzerland Caucus
- House Cancer Caucus
- International Conservation Caucus
- Passenger Rail Caucus
- Republican Study Committee

=== Medical care advocacy ===
Bachus and his wife, Linda, have been recognized by multiple organizations for their support and contributions to medical research.

Bachus has been called a "champion for cancer patients"; he and Mrs. Bachus were awarded the National Distinguished Advocacy Award for Excellence in Cancer-Fighting Public Policy by The American Cancer Society Cancer Action Network (ACS CAN), the group's highest legislative honor.

Bachus was a member of the Bipartisan Congressional Task Force on Alzheimer's Disease. During his Congressional tenure, he was also a member of the Cancer Caucus, Autism Caucus, Alzheimer's Task Force, Biomedical Research Caucus, Immigration Reform Caucus, Pro-Life Caucus.

In October 2014, Mr. and Mrs. Bachus were honored at the National Multiple Sclerosis Society's Ambassadors Ball for their efforts on behalf of the organization's Alabama-Mississippi chapter.

In September 2014, Linda Bachus was awarded Congressional Families Leadership Award for her role as the first executive director of the Congressional Families Cancer Prevention Program.

Bachus sponsored legislation prioritizing palliative care.

== U.S. Export-Import Bank ==
Bachus was nominated by President Donald Trump to be a member of the board of directors of the U.S. Export-Import Bank and he was confirmed by the U.S. Senate in May 2019. He served until July 2023 when his term expired. He was nominated for a second term by President Joe Biden and confirmed in December 2023.

== Personal life ==
Bachus has three children and two step-children with his wife, Linda.

== Electoral history ==
Alabama's 6th congressional district election, 1992
Party	Candidate	Votes	%
Republican	Spencer Bachus	146,599	52.4
Democratic	Ben Erdreich (incumbent)	126,062	45.0
Independent	Carla Cloum	4,521	1.6
Libertarian	Mark Bodenhausen	2,836	1.0
Total votes		280,018	100.0
Republican gain from Democratic			

Alabama's 6th congressional district election, 1994
Party	Candidate	Votes	%
Republican	Spencer Bachus (incumbent)	155,047	79.1
Democratic	Larry Fortenberry	41,030	20.9
Total votes		196,077	100.0
Republican hold			

Alabama's 6th congressional district election, 1996
Party	Candidate	Votes	%
Republican	Spencer Bachus (incumbent)	180,781	71.0
Democratic	Mary Lynn Bates	69,592	27.3
Libertarian	T. Franklin Hayes	2,293	0.9
Natural Law	Diane Susan Vogel	2,113	0.8
Total votes		254,779	100.0
Republican hold			

Alabama's 6th congressional district election, 1998
Party	Candidate	Votes	%
Republican	Spencer Bachus (incumbent)	154,761	71.8
Democratic	Donna Wesson Smalley	60,657	28.2
Total votes		215,418	100.0
Republican hold			

Alabama's 6th congressional district election, 2000
Party	Candidate	Votes	%
Republican	Spencer Bachus (incumbent)	212,751	88.3
Libertarian	Terry Reagin	28,189	11.7
Total votes		240,940	100.0
Republican hold			

Alabama's 6th congressional district election, 2002
Party	Candidate	Votes	%
Republican	Spencer Bachus (incumbent)	178,171	90.1
Libertarian	J. Holden McAllister	19,639	9.9
Total votes		197,810	100.0
Republican hold			

Alabama's 6th congressional district election, 2004
Party	Candidate	Votes	%
Republican	Spencer Bachus (incumbent)	264,819	100.0
Total votes		264,819	100.0
Republican hold			

Alabama's 6th congressional district election, 2006
Party	Candidate	Votes	%
Republican	Spencer Bachus (incumbent)	163,514	100.0
Total votes		163,514	100.0
Republican hold			

Alabama's 6th congressional district election, 2008
Party	Candidate	Votes	%
Republican	Spencer Bachus (incumbent)	280,902	100.0
Total votes		280,902	100.0
Republican hold			

Alabama's 6th congressional district election, 2010
Party	Candidate	Votes	%
Republican	Spencer Bachus (incumbent)	205,288	100.0
Total votes		205,288	100.0
Republican hold			

Alabama's 6th congressional district Republican primary, 2012
Party	Candidate	Votes	%
Republican	Spencer Bachus (incumbent)	63,359	61.5
Republican	Scott Beason	28,671	27.9
Republican	David Standridge	8,120	7.9
Republican	Al Mickle	2,929	2.7
Republican	Stan Pate (write-in)	33	0.0
Total votes		103,112	100.0

Alabama's 6th congressional district election, 2012
Party	Candidate	Votes	%
Republican	Spencer Bachus (incumbent)	219,262	71.2
Democratic	Penny H. Bailey	88,267	28.6
Write-in		573	0.2
Republican hold			

== See also ==
- List of Auburn University people

Party political offices
Vacant Title last held by Don Collins	Republican nominee for Attorney General of Alabama; 1990	Succeeded by Jeff Sessions
Preceded by Elbert Peters	Chair of the Alabama Republican Party; 1991–1992	Succeeded by Elbert Peters
U.S. House of Representatives
Preceded by Ben Erdreich	Member of the U.S. House of Representatives from Alabama's 6th congressional district 1993–2015	Succeeded by Gary Palmer
Preceded by Barney Frank	Ranking Member of the House Financial Services Committee; 2007–2011	Succeeded by Barney Frank
Preceded by Barney Frank	Chair of the House Financial Services Committee; 2011–2013	Succeeded by Jeb Hensarling
U.S. order of precedence (ceremonial)
Preceded by Bill Lipinski as Former U.S. Representative	Order of precedence of the United States as Former U.S. Representative	Succeeded by John Mica as Former U.S. Representative
