= Scott Beason =

American politician

Member of the Alabama Senate from the 17th district
- In office November 8, 2006 – November 5, 2014
- Preceded by: Jack Biddle
- Succeeded by: Shay Shelnutt

Member of the Alabama House of Representatives from the 51st district
- In office November 6, 2002 – November 8, 2006
- Preceded by: Jim Townsend
- Succeeded by: Allen Treadaway

Member of the Alabama House of Representatives from the 50th district
- In office November 4, 1998 – November 6, 2002
- Preceded by: Jim Townsend
- Succeeded by: Jim McClendon

Personal details
- Born: October 13, 1969 (age 56) Hartselle, Alabama, U.S.
- Party: Republican
- Spouse: Lori Beason
- Children: Keller, Merritt and McCalan Beason
- Profession: Builder and renovator

Scott Beason (born October 13, 1969) is an American talk radio host and a Republican former member of the Alabama Senate, representing the 17th District from 2006 to 2014. He ran unsuccessfully in 2012 against incumbent Spencer Bachus for the GOP nomination for the U.S. House of Representatives in Alabama's 6th congressional district. He unsuccessfully sought the nomination to the same seat in 2014.The 17th Senate District currently comprises northern and western Jefferson County as well as a large portion of St. Clair County. From 1998 to 2006, Beason was a member of the Alabama House of Representatives.

== Early life, education, and business career ==
Beason was born in Hartselle, Alabama. In 1991, he received a degree in geology from the University of Alabama at Tuscaloosa. He was a geologist from 1993 to 1997, having been employed by Bondurant Environmental Consulting. He currently owns Custom Renovators and Old South Construction.

== 1994 run for Alabama Senate ==
In 1994, he ran for Alabama's Senate District 17 as a Republican. He lost in the primary to incumbent State Representative Jack Biddle 60 to 40 percent.

== Alabama House of Representatives ==
=== Elections ===
In 1998, won the primary runoff in Alabama's House District 51 against State Representative Jim Townsend with 53% of the vote. He won the general election with 99% of the vote. Beason won re-election in 2002 in the newly redistricted 51st district.

=== Tenure ===
He broke with his own party to oppose Amendment One, which would have allegedly been the largest tax increase in Alabama's history.

== Alabama Senate ==
=== Elections ===
In 2006, he sought a rematch against Biddle, the incumbent of Alabama's 17th Senate District. Beason defeated Biddle, receiving 59% of the vote. He won the general election in 2006 with 99% and won re-election in 2010 with 81%.

On January 31, 2014, Beason announced that he would not stand for re-election to a third term.

=== Tenure ===
==== English language ====
He has voted for a bill to require the Alabama driver's license exam to be given in English only. He also supported a constitutional amendment making English the official language of Alabama.

==== Illegal Immigration ====
Beason was the senate sponsor of Alabama's controversial immigration law, parts of which took effect in late September 2011. He has been quoted in the press saying of immigrants, "When their children grow up and get the chance to vote, they vote for Democrats."

==== 2011 bingo trial ====
Beason was a chief prosecution witness in the 2011 trial of nine individuals for allegedly attempting to exchange votes for campaign contributions. Beason wore a recording device to surreptitiously record his colleagues in the Alabama state senate. In the recordings Beason can be heard referring to black voters in Greene County, Alabama as "aborigines."

==== Superintendent ====
Beason was roundly criticized in the Montgomery Advertiser for introducing an "unwise and unwarranted" bill that would make the position of state superintendent for education an elected position.

=== Committee assignments ===
- Finance and Taxation Education
- Governmental Affairs
- Job Creation and Economic Development
- Local Legislation No. 2
- Rules

== 2012 congressional election ==
On January 12, 2012, Beason held at a press conference at the Alabama GOP Headquarters, at which he announced his candidacy in the March 13, 2012 Republican primary for Alabama's 6th congressional district, in which he opposed U.S. Representative Spencer Bachus. Previously, Beason was subject to speculation that he might run for governor in 2014 or 2018.

Beason ran well to Bachus' right, saying that if elected he would provide "true conservative leadership." Bachus heavily outspent him. The incumbent spent over $1.5 million, outspending Beason 45–1. Bachus defeated him 59%-27%, winning every county in the district, with the notable exception of Blount County, which was won by Blount County Probate Judge David Standridge.

Beason did not have to give up his state senate seat to run for Congress; Alabama state senators serve four-year terms, and Beason was not up for reelection again until 2014.

== 2014 congressional election ==
With Bachus announcing his retirement, the Republican primary field was thrown wide open. Initially, Beason said that he was "95 percent sure" he would run for re-election to his State Senate seat, but he changed his mind about three weeks later by deciding not to run again. He did not specifically rule out running for the Congressional seat.

== Radio ==
After leaving elected office, Beason — who had occasionally filled in as a substitute host on Birmingham-area talk radio shows, became a co-host of "Yellowhammer Radio" on WYDE-FM from 11 a.m. to 1 p.m. each weekday. For most of his time on the show, Beason hosted the first hour by himself, with Yellowhammer News publisher Cliff Sims joining Beason for the second hour. Sims left Yellowhammer in 2017 to join the Donald Trump administration, and Beason left the show to host his own show in the time slot prior to Yellowhammer Radio, from 9 to 11 a.m. weekdays.

== Personal life ==
Beason and his family are members of Gardendale First Baptist Church. He is a member of the Jefferson County Republican Executive Committee and the Alabama Republican Executive Committee.
