= Alabama's 16th Senate district =

Alabama's 16th State Senate district
Senator
J. T. Waggoner; R–Birmingham
- Demographics: 71.8% White; 16.4% Black; 4.9% Hispanic; 4.3% Asian
- Population (2022): 144,190

Alabama's 16th Senate district is one of 35 districts in the Alabama Senate. The district has been represented by J. T. Waggoner since 1990.

== Geography ==
Election	Map	Counties in District
2026; 2022		Portions of Jefferson, Shelby
2018		Portions of Jefferson, Shelby
2014		Portions of Jefferson, Shelby
2010; 2006; 2002		Portions of Jefferson, Shelby

== Election history ==
=== Elections in the 2020s ===
Alabama Senate election, 2022: Senate District 16
Party	Candidate	Votes	%	±%
Republican	J. T. Waggoner (Incumbent)	33,719	96.11	+33.23
Write-in		1,365	3.89	+3.84
Majority		32,354	92.22	+66.41
Turnout		35,084		
Republican hold				

=== Elections in the 2010s ===
Alabama Senate election, 2018: Senate District 16
Party	Candidate	Votes	%	±%
Republican	J. T. Waggoner (Incumbent)	37,068	62.88	−14.27
Democratic	Lindsey Deckard	21,851	37.07	+14.33
Write-in		32	0.05	-0.07
Majority		15,217	25.81	−28.60
Turnout		58,951		
Republican hold				

Alabama Senate election, 2014: Senate District 16
Party	Candidate	Votes	%	±%
Republican	J. T. Waggoner (Incumbent)	28,107	77.15	−21.32
Democratic	Cindy Bell	8,284	22.74	+22.74
Write-in		42	0.12	-1.41
Majority		19,823	54.41	−42.54
Turnout		36,433		
Republican hold				

Alabama Senate election, 2010: Senate District 16
Party	Candidate	Votes	%	±%
Republican	J. T. Waggoner (Incumbent)	43,604	98.47	+20.81
Write-in		676	1.53	+1.42
Majority		42,928	96.95	+41.52
Turnout		44,280		
Republican hold				

=== Elections in the 2000s ===
Alabama Senate election, 2006: Senate District 16
Party	Candidate	Votes	%	±%
Republican	J. T. Waggoner (Incumbent)	34,196	77.66	−20.90
Democratic	Russ Parker	9,789	22.23	+22.23
Write-in		47	0.11	-1.33
Majority		24,407	55.43	−41.69
Turnout		44,032		
Republican hold				

Alabama Senate election, 2002: Senate District 16
Party	Candidate	Votes	%	±%
Republican	J. T. Waggoner (Incumbent)	42,316	98.56	+19.51
Write-in		618	1.44	+1.35
Majority		41,698	97.12	+38.93
Turnout		42,934		
Republican hold				

=== Elections in the 1990s ===
Alabama Senate election, 1998: Senate District 16
Party	Candidate	Votes	%	±%
Republican	J. T. Waggoner (Incumbent)	42,417	79.05	−19.94
Democratic	Steven M. Johns	11,193	20.86	+20.86
Write-in		47	0.09	-0.92
Majority		31,224	58.19	−39.79
Turnout		53,657		
Republican hold				

Alabama Senate election, 1994: Senate District 16
Party	Candidate	Votes	%	±%
Republican	J. T. Waggoner (Incumbent)	42,696	98.99	+0.90
Write-in		436	1.01	-0.90
Majority		42,260	97.98	+1.79
Turnout		43,132		
Republican hold				

Alabama Senate election, 1990: Senate District 16
Party	Candidate	Votes	%	±%
Republican	J. T. Waggoner	37,860	98.09	+12.35
Write-in		736	1.91	+1.91
Majority		37,124	96.19	+24.71
Turnout		38,596		
Republican hold				

=== Elections in the 1980s ===
Alabama Senate election, 1986: Senate District 16
Party	Candidate	Votes	%	±%
Republican	William J. Cabaniss (Incumbent)	41,834	85.74	−1.23
Democratic	Robert Hood	6,959	14.26	+1.23
Majority		34,875	71.48	−2.46
Turnout		48,793		
Republican hold				

Alabama Senate election, 1983: Senate District 16
Party	Candidate	Votes	%	±%
Republican	William J. Cabaniss (Incumbent)	9,238	86.97	+86.97
Democratic	Robert Hood	1,384	13.03	−86.97
Majority		7,854	73.94	
Turnout		10,622		
Republican gain from Democratic				

Alabama Senate election, 1982: Senate District 16
Party	Candidate	Votes	%	±%
Democratic	Ryan deGraffenried (Incumbent)	20,149	100.00	
Majority		20,149	100.00	
Turnout		20,149		
Democratic hold				

== District officeholders ==
Senators take office at midnight on the day of their election.

- J. T. Waggoner (1990–present)
- William J. Cabaniss (1983–1990)
- Ryan deGraffenried (1978–1983)
- Richard Shelby (1974–1978)
- Robert H. Wilder (1970–1974)
- Tom Radney (1966–1970)
- Roland Cooper (1962–1966)
- Carl C. Golson (1958–1962)
- Joe B. Davis (1954–1958)
