= Lake Leon (Florida) =

Lake in the state of Florida, United States

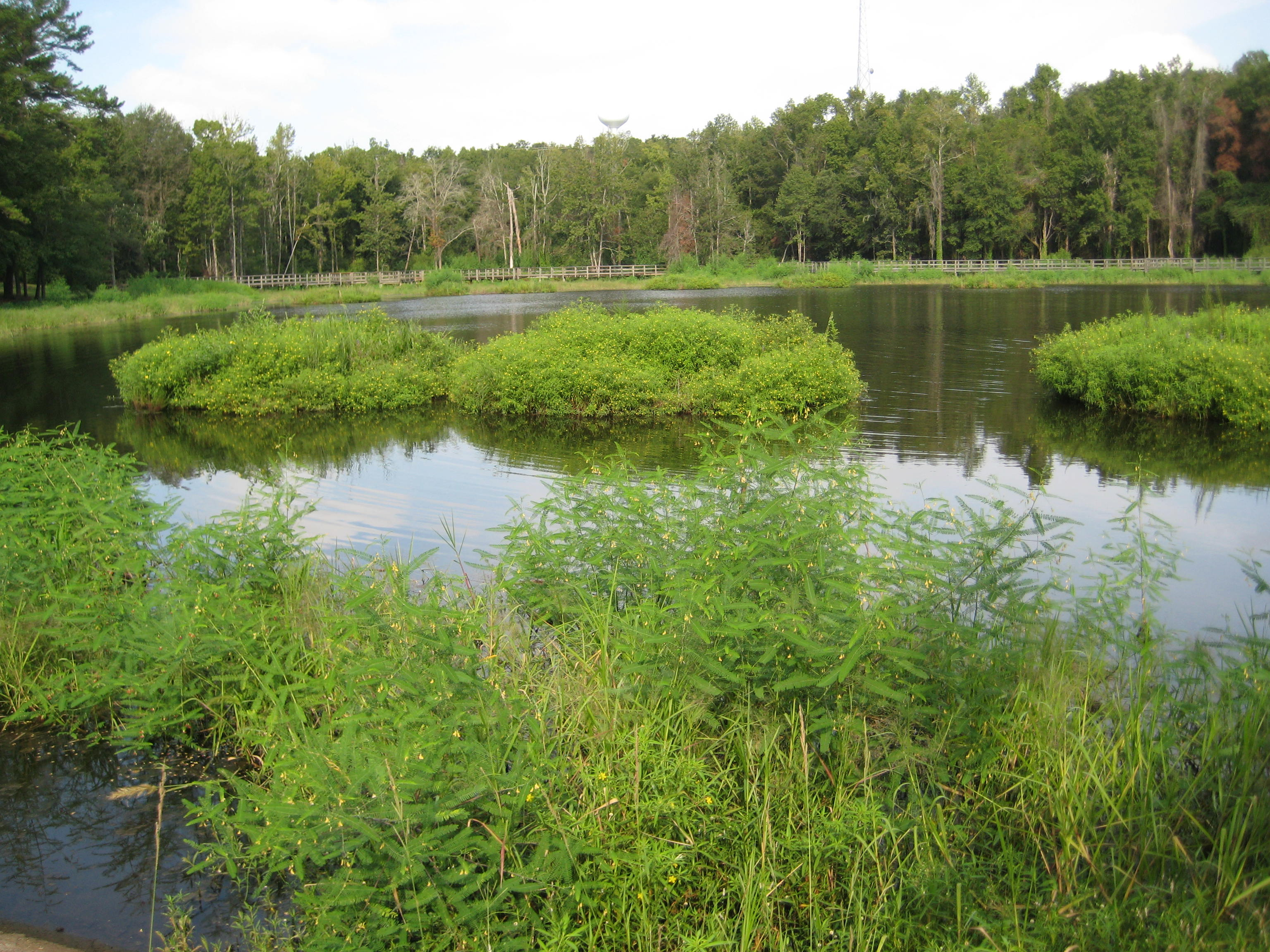
- Lake Leon at Tom Brown Park in Tallahassee, Florida in the late summer of 2011, view toward the West. Several floating islands can be seen made of foam mats to provide a substrate for aquatic plants.

- Location within Florida Location within the United States
- Location: Tom Brown Park, Tallahassee, Florida
- Coordinates: 30°26′31″N 84°12′50″W
- Basin countries: United States

Lake Leon, also known as Tom Brown Park Pond, is a small lake on the eastern side of Tallahassee, Florida, United States. Located within Tom Brown Park, there is a nature trail around the lake, with a boardwalk along one side.

== Geography ==
Lake Leon has a maximum lake depth of 11 feet. Its average depth is estimated to be 6 feet.
