= Jack Biddle (politician) =

American politician (1930–2024)

Member of the Alabama Senate from the 17th district
- In office 1994–2006
- Preceded by: Mac Parsons
- Succeeded by: Scott Beason

Member of the Alabama House of Representatives
- In office 1974–1994
- Constituency: 35th district (1974–1983); 43rd district (1983–1994)

Personal details
- Born: February 7, 1930 Birmingham, Alabama, U.S.
- Died: February 18, 2024 (aged 94) Gardendale, Alabama, U.S.
- Party: Republican Party (from 1985)
- Other political affiliations: Democratic (until 1983); Independent (1983–1985)
- Spouse: Nena Berry (died 2022)
- Children: 2
- Education: Howard College
- Profession: Real estate broker

Jack Biddle III (February 7, 1930 – February 18, 2024) was an American politician who served in the Alabama Legislature for 32 years, in the Alabama House of Representatives from 1974 to 1994, and the Alabama Senate from 1994 to 2006. Biddle was the first and only person to be elected to the Alabama state legislature as a Democratic, Republican, and independent representative at different points in his tenure.

== Early life ==
Jack Biddle III was born on February 7, 1930, in Birmingham, Alabama. After graduating with a bachelor's degree from Howard College, Biddle worked as a real estate broker, as well as assistant to the CEO of Drummond Company, a coal mining corporation. A veteran of the United States Army, Biddle served in the Counterintelligence Corps.

== Political career ==
=== Alabama House of Representatives (1974–1994) ===
Biddle first ran for the Alabama House of Representatives in 1970, in which he sought the place 8 seat for the 14th district, but lost the Democratic primary to incumbent representative Raymond Weeks. In 1974, Biddle ran for election to the 35th district, which included Jefferson County, with the Democratic Party's nomination. Biddle defeated Republican nominee Mary P. Douglas, with more than 86% of the vote.

Biddle started out in the Alabama Legislature as a conservative Democrat. In 1975, he co-sponsored a bill that mandated the death penalty in cases of first-degree murder. It was later signed into law by Governor George Wallace. From 1978 to 1982, he served on the leadership team of Speaker of the House Joe McCorquodale, and was chair of the House Rules Committee.

In 1980, Biddle was one of three state legislators indicted by a grand jury in Birmingham, Alabama, on charges of influence peddling, relating to his role with the Drummond Company and the coal industry. In the wake of the indictment, Biddle resigned as chair of the House Rules Committee, but did not resign from the legislature. Fellow representative Earl Cheatwood called for an investigation of wrongdoing by members of the House of Representatives. However, the charges were dropped against Biddle and the other legislators when U.S. district judge Frank Hampton McFadden threw out the case in July 1980. Biddle's attorney published a statement expressing gratitude.

In 1981, Biddle was instrumental in passing a law that removed a tax on prescription drugs in Alabama. Biddle was re-elected in 1982, defeating Republican nominee Ken Trucks with 59% of the vote. Subsequently, Biddle was named chair of the House Health Committee under Speaker of the House Tom Drake. In 1983, a special legislative election was called in Alabama, and Biddle was redistricted to the 43rd district under a new map. However, the Alabama Democratic Party's executive committee rejected Biddle as their nominee for the election, instead choosing former state representative Earl Cheatwood. According to columnist and historian Steve Flowers, Biddle was denied the nomination because of his conservative policies, as a liberal wing of the Democratic Party controlled the committee at the time. Biddle qualified as an independent candidate to run against Cheatwood and Republican nominee Ken Trucks. Biddle won in a close three-way race, with 36.4% of the vote to Cheatwood's 35.6% and Trucks' 27.9%.

Having served as an independent in the new district since his re-election in 1983, Biddle officially made a party switch to the Republican Party in August 1985. At the time, he was the only remaining representative who was unaffiliated. Marty Connors, a director for the state Republican party, called it "the most significant political event for the Alabama Republican Party since the 1984 election". Biddle joining the Republican Party and later being re-elected as a Republican made him the first and only person to be elected to the Alabama Legislature as a Democratic, Republican, and Independent representative at different points in his tenure.

=== Alabama Senate (1994–2006) ===
In 1994, Biddle chose to run for the Alabama Senate's 17th district. Redistricting that year made the seat more favorable to Republicans, and the incumbent, Mac Parsons, retired to run for commissioner of agriculture. Biddle faced future state representative Scott Beason, also a Gardendale resident, in the Republican primary. Biddle won and was unopposed in the general election that November. That same year, Biddle endorsed Fob James in his run for governor as a Republican, which James won in the gubernatorial election.

Biddle was named to the Senate Rules Committee in 1995, during a time in which Democrats controlled the Alabama Senate. He later resigned from his seat on the committee in 2003, despite its powerful position, saying that he was "stretched too thin" with six other committee assignments.

In 2001, a section of U.S. Route 31 near Biddle's hometown of Gardendale was named the Jack Biddle Highway in honor of Biddle. During his career, Biddle was noted for his work in mental health advocacy; he was a member of the University of Alabama at Birmingham's psychiatry advisory board and worked with the National Alliance on Mental Illness. During his tenure in the state senate, Biddle was "the Senator most often quoted by his fellow Senators", and was noted for his "Biddle-isms", according to colleague Steve French.

During the 2006 election cycle, Biddle faced a rematch against Scott Beason in the Republican primary. Steve Flowers wrote that although Biddle was a respected presence in the legislature for his pragmatism, age was also an issue in the primary, as Biddle was 76 and Beason was 36. The primary election led to attack ads being exchanged between Biddle and Beason, but Beason eventually triumphed, unseating Biddle for the Republican nomination. Beason succeeded Biddle as state senator that November. Biddle later said of Beason that "I have nothing bad to say about Scott, I think he is doing a good job. I'm wishing him all of the success in the world".

== Personal life ==
Biddle, a long-time resident of Gardendale, Alabama, was married to Nena Berry, who died in 2022. The Biddles had two children and attended Mount Vernon Methodist Church, where Biddle was on the church's official board.

Biddle died in Gardendale on February 18, 2024, at the age of 94.
