= Tom Brown Park =

Park in Tallahassee, Florida

Coordinates: 30.4468°N 84.2146°W

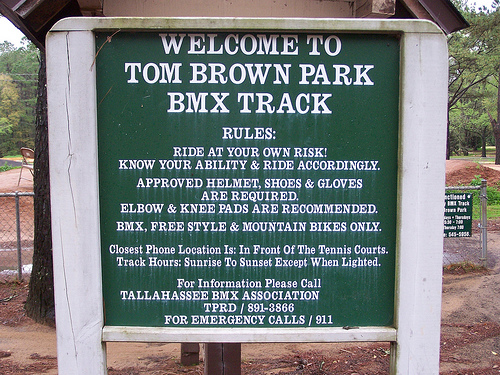
The sign at the BMX track.

Tom Brown Park is a 255-acre (1.03 km^{2}) city park in Tallahassee, Florida, United States.

Located on the eastern side of Tallahassee off Capital Circle, Tom Brown Park is a large recreation park, featuring several baseball fields, a disc golf course, tennis courts, a BMX track, a 3.1 mile mountain bike trail known as Magnolia Trail, picnic areas and nature trails for walking and running.

Lake Leon is located in the park, along with the southern end of the Goose Pond Trail and the east end of the Fern Trail.

This park also has a dog park, with fenced-in areas for small and large dogs to play.

The park has hosted community events.
