= Ben Erdreich =

American lawyer & politician

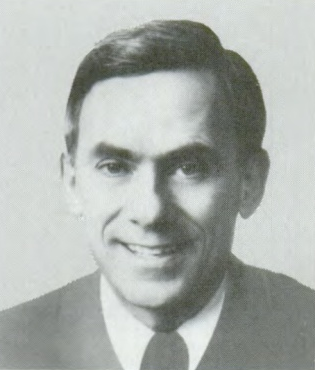

Chair of the United States Merit Systems Protection Board
- In office 1993–2000
- President: Bill Clinton
- Preceded by: Daniel R. Levinson
- Succeeded by: Barbara Sapin

Member of the U.S. House of Representatives from Alabama's 6th district
- In office January 3, 1983 – January 3, 1993
- Preceded by: Albert L. Smith Jr.
- Succeeded by: Spencer Bachus

Personal details
- Born: Benjamin Leader Erdreich; December 9, 1938 (age 87) Birmingham, Alabama, U.S.
- Party: Democratic
- Education: Yale University (BA); University of Alabama (JD)

Benjamin Leader Erdreich (born December 9, 1938) is an American lawyer and retired politician from Alabama. A member of the Democratic Party, he served five terms as a member of the United States House of Representatives from 1983 to 1993.

== Early life ==
Erdreich was born in Birmingham, Alabama, to an upper-middle-class family. He attended Yale University, graduating in 1960. He served as editor of the Alabama Law Review while attending the University of Alabama law school, graduating in 1963. He passed the bar that year.

After law school, he served two years in the United States Army before setting up a private law practice.

=== Early political career ===
Between 1970 and 1974, Erdreich served one term as a Democrat in the Alabama House of Representatives. He was elected as a Jefferson County Commissioner, serving until 1982.

== Congressional career ==
In 1982, Erdreich was elected to Congress from the Alabama's 6th congressional district, based in Birmingham, defeating one-term Republican incumbent Albert Smith, Jr. To date, this is the last time a Democratic challenger defeated a Republican congressman in Alabama. He is among a small number of Jewish politicians to be elected to federal office from the Deep South.

Erdreich was the first Democrat to represent the 6th district since 1965. It was among the five districts won in 1964 by Republicans during Barry Goldwater's sweep of the state in that year's presidential election. Analysts believe that Goldwater's performance in Alabama was also related to resistance and opposition to federal passage of civil rights legislation in 1964, including the Civil Rights Act, that was disapproved of by many white residents.

Erdreich was re-elected four times, rarely facing serious opposition. Known for his bipartisan work in Congress, Erdreich co-sponsored several hundred bills during his five terms.

Erdreich voted for the Abandoned Shipwrecks Act of 1987. The Act asserts United States title to certain abandoned shipwrecks located on or embedded in submerged lands under state jurisdiction, and transfers title to the respective state, thereby empowering states to manage these cultural and historical resources more efficiently, with the goal of preventing treasure hunters and salvagers from damaging them. President Ronald Reagan signed it into law on April 28, 1988.

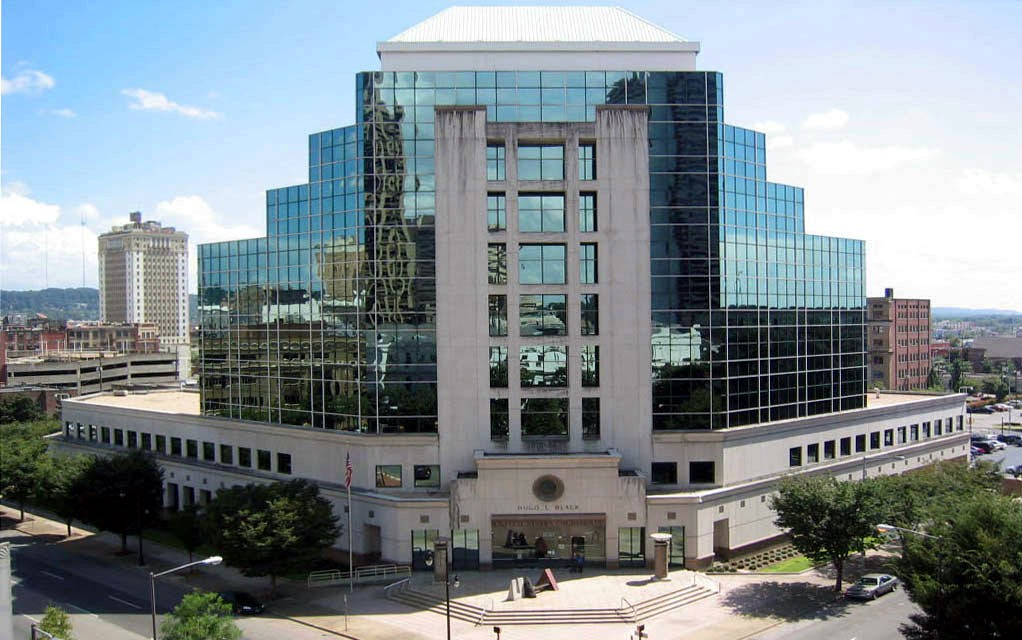
The Hugo L. Black United States Courthouse in Birmingham, Alabama

He was the lead sponsor of four bills that were signed by the president and enacted into law:

- 1987, H.R. 614, A bill to designate the new United States courthouse in Birmingham, Alabama, as the "Hugo L. Black United States Courthouse" (co-sponsored by the entire Alabama congressional delegation).
- 1990, H.R. 3691, to redesignate the Federal building located at 1800 5th Avenue, North in Birmingham, Alabama, as the "Robert S. Vance Federal Building" (co-sponsored by the entire Alabama congressional delegation and several others).
- 1990, H.R. 1243, The Department of Energy Metal Casting Competitiveness Research Act of 1990, co-sponsored by the entire Alabama congressional delegation and several others.
- 1992, H.R.4398, The Federal Reserve Bank Branch Modernization Act, with no co-sponsors.

=== 1992 campaign ===
1992, Erdreich's district was significantly redrawn as a result of a United States Department of Justice directive to create a majority-black district in the Birmingham area in order to overcome problems of voter dilution. African Americans had been divided into different districts that diluted their voting power by making them a minority in each district, preventing them from electing candidates of their choice. The state legislature failed to take action, and a federal court drew a map that shifted most of Birmingham's black residents to the 7th District.

To make up for the loss in population, the 6th was redrawn to take in several whiter and wealthier areas of Shelby and Tuscaloosa counties, areas which Erdreich had never previously represented. Erdreich now found himself in a mostly suburban district that was almost 97 percent white, and was on paper one of the most Republican districts in the country. By comparison, his old district was urban in character, with more liberal Democratic voters, and approximately 35 percent black.

Erdreich outspent his opponent, state Republican Party chairman Spencer Bachus, almost 2 to 1, but could not overcome the more conservative hue of his new district and lost by seven percentage points, 52% to 45%. In the same election, George H. W. Bush prevailed over challenger Bill Clinton in the district by about 74 percent to 26 percent, demonstrating its conservative character. Further demonstrating just how Republican this district was, Erdreich is the last Democrat to cross the 40 percent mark in this district, and only one Democratic challenger has garnered even 30 percent since Erdreich left office.

== Recent life and career ==
Erdreich is currently involved with property development in Birmingham, concentrating on central-city projects.

== See also ==
- List of Jewish members of the United States Congress

== Notes ==
U.S. House of Representatives
Preceded by Albert L. Smith Jr.	Member of the U.S. House of Representatives from Alabama's 6th congressional district 1983–1993	Succeeded by Spencer Bachus
U.S. order of precedence (ceremonial)
Preceded by Thomas W. Ewing as Former U.S. Representative	Order of precedence of the United States as Former U.S. Representative	Succeeded by Earl Hilliard as Former U.S. Representative
