= 1990 United States Senate election in Alabama =

- November 6, 1990
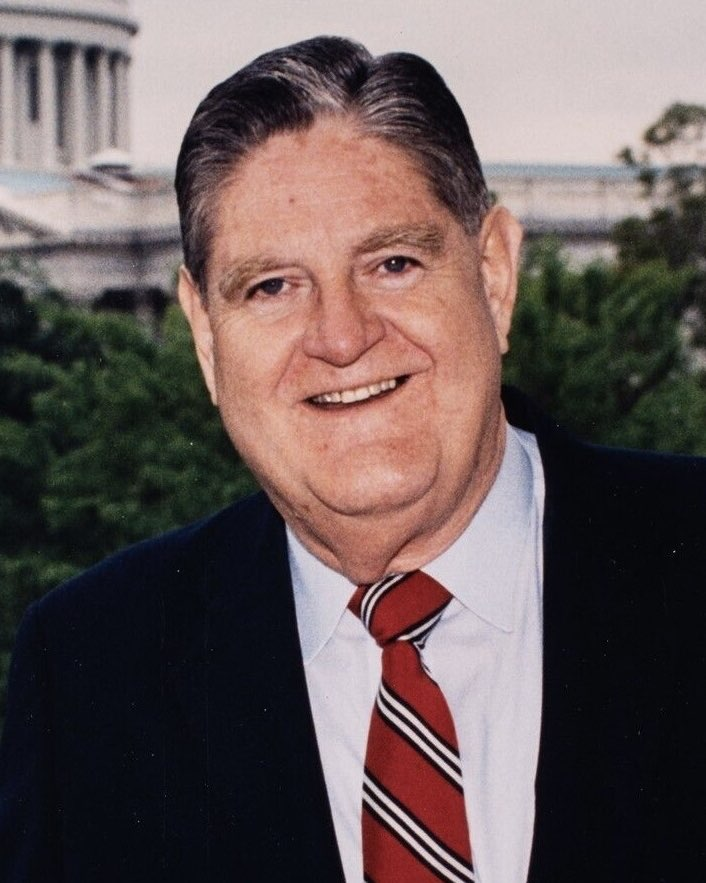

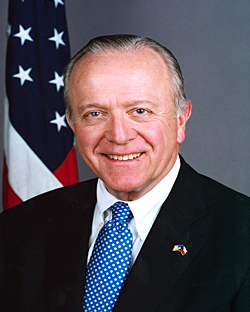
Nominee	Howell Heflin	Bill Cabaniss
Party	Democratic	Republican
Popular vote	717,814	467,190
Percentage	60.57%	39.43%
- Heflin: 50–60% 60–70% 70–80% 80–90% Cabaniss: 50–60%
U.S. senator before election
Howell Heflin
Democratic
Elected U.S. Senator
Howell Heflin
Democratic

The 1990 United States Senate election in Alabama was held on November 6, 1990. Democratic incumbent Howell Heflin won re-election to a third term. This was the last time a Democrat was elected to the Class 2 Senate seat in Alabama until 2017, and the last time overall in which a Democrat was elected to and served a full term as a Democrat in the United States Senate from Alabama.

== General election ==
=== Candidates ===
- Bill Cabaniss, State Senator from Birmingham (Republican)
- Howell Heflin, incumbent U.S. Senator since 1979 (Democratic)

=== Results ===
General election results
Party	Candidate	Votes	%	±%
Democratic	Howell Heflin (incumbent)	717,814	60.57%	−2.10%
Republican	Bill Cabaniss	467,190	39.43%	+3.00%
Total votes		1,184,954	100.00%	
Democratic hold				

== See also ==
- 1990 United States Senate elections
