= Howell Heflin =

American politician (1921–2005)

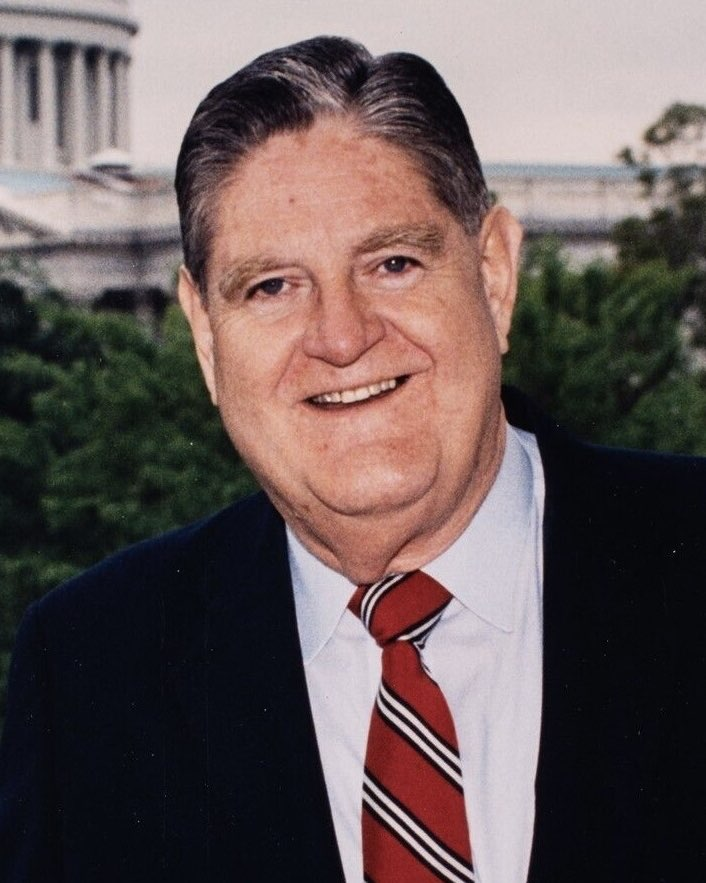

United States Senator from Alabama
- In office January 3, 1979 – January 3, 1997
- Preceded by: John Sparkman
- Succeeded by: Jeff Sessions
Senate positions
Chair of the Senate Ethics Committee
In office January 3, 1987 – January 3, 1992
Preceded by	Ted Stevens
Succeeded by	Terry Sanford
In office 1980 – January 3, 1981
Preceded by	Adlai Stevenson III
Succeeded by	Malcolm Wallop
Vice Chair of the Senate Ethics Committee
In office January 3, 1981 – January 3, 1987
Preceded by	Malcolm Wallop
Succeeded by	Warren Rudman

Chief Justice of the Alabama Supreme Court
- In office January 19, 1971 – January 17, 1977
- Preceded by: J. Ed Livingston
- Succeeded by: C. C. Torbert Jr.

Personal details
- Born: Howell Thomas Heflin; June 19, 1921 Poulan, Georgia, U.S.
- Died: March 29, 2005 (aged 83) Sheffield, Alabama, U.S.
- Resting place: Glendale Cemetery; Leighton, Alabama, U.S.
- Party: Democratic
- Spouses: Elizabeth Ann Carmichael; (m. 1952)
- Parents: Marvin Heflin; Louise S. Heflin
- Relatives: Robert Stell Heflin (great-uncle); James Thomas Heflin (uncle)
- Education: Birmingham-Southern College (BA); University of Alabama (LLB)

Military service
- Allegiance: United States
- Branch/service: United States Marine Corps
- Years of service: 1942–1946
- Rank: Major
- Battles/wars: World War II
- Awards: Silver Star; Purple Heart (2)
- Howell Heflin's voice Heflin speaks in support of a balanced budget amendment to the Constitution; Recorded June 9, 1992

Howell Thomas Heflin (June 19, 1921 – March 29, 2005) was an American lawyer and politician. A member of the Democratic Party, he represented Alabama in the United States Senate from 1979 to 1997.

== Early life ==
Heflin was born on June 19, 1921, in Poulan, Georgia. His father Marvin Heflin was a Methodist minister, and his mother, Louise Strudwick Heflin, a former teacher. He attended public school in Alabama, graduating from Colbert County High School in Leighton. He earned his Bachelor of Arts degree in 1942 from Birmingham-Southern College in Birmingham, where he became a member of Lambda Chi Alpha fraternity. There was a tradition of politics in his family: He was a nephew of James Thomas Heflin, a prominent white supremacist politician and U.S. Senator, and great-nephew of Robert Stell Heflin, a U.S. Representative.

During World War II, from 1942 to 1946, Heflin served as an officer in the United States Marine Corps. He was awarded the Silver Star for valor in combat and received two Purple Heart medals, having seen action on Bougainville and Guam.

After World War II, Heflin attended the University of Alabama School of Law, from which he graduated in 1948. For nearly two decades, he served as a law professor, while concurrently practicing law in Tuscumbia, Alabama.

== Political career ==
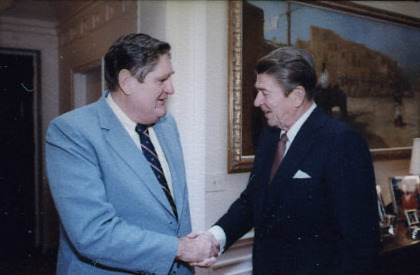
Heflin greeting President Ronald Reagan in 1981

In 1970, Heflin was elected Chief Justice of the Alabama Supreme Court, serving from 1971 to 1977.

In 1978, Heflin was elected to the United States Senate to succeed fellow Democrat John Sparkman, who had been Adlai E. Stevenson's running mate in the 1952 presidential election. Heflin won his party's nomination by defeating U.S. Representative Walter Flowers of Tuscaloosa, a long-time George Wallace ally. The 1966 Republican gubernatorial nominee, former U.S. Representative James D. Martin of Gadsden, announced that he would challenge Heflin. But Martin switched to a second Senate race for a two-year term created by the sudden death of Senator James B. Allen, leaving Heflin without a Republican opponent.

In March 1981, President Reagan was shot during an assassination attempt by John Hinckley, Jr., outside the Hilton Hotel in Washington, D. C., Hinckley being brought to trial fourteen months afterward. Heflin espoused the view that the time between the incident and the trial was part of the need for an overhauling of the criminal justice system, "so that it can more efficiently and effectively deal with the rising epidemic of violent crime in this nation", and noted the shootings of Pope John Paul II and President of Egypt Anwar Sadat as incidents that had happened after the Reagan shooting, yet had already seen the assailants be convicted and either jailed or executed. Heflin stated that the delays in bringing defendants to trial formed "contempt for the system", in addition to denouncing the delays as part of the problem, calling for the Senate to form a "Crime Caucus", as part of an attempt to "put aside petty partisan politics and unite in an effort to wage a successful war on crime".

In July 1981, Heflin announced he would introduce legislation calling for the creation of a national court of appeals, and that such legislation would relieve the Supreme Court of some of its present burdens, while increasing the national appellate capacity. The legislation was intended to also initiate a long-range study of the federal court system, and call for major reforms in the American judiciary. Heflin noted that only 289 of the 4,242 petitions for hearings submitted to the Supreme Court in the previous year were granted, and that a national appeals court would resolve feuds in the federal circuit courts.

In 1984, Heflin won a second Senate term, handily defeating Republican former U.S. Representative Albert L. Smith, Jr., of Birmingham, who had hoped to win by running on the re-election coattails of President Ronald Reagan. Heflin was re-elected to a third term in 1990, defeating State Senator William J. Cabaniss, who later served as United States Ambassador to the Czech Republic under George W. Bush. Heflin did not run for re-election in 1996, and was succeeded by Republican Jeff Sessions.

In 1987, Heflin, a member of the Senate Judiciary Committee, voted against confirmation of Judge Robert Bork to the Supreme Court of the United States.

Heflin became chairman of the Select Committee on Ethics. While on the Ethics Committee, he led the prosecution against fellow Democratic senator Howard Cannon of Nevada for violations of Senate rules.

As a conservative Democrat, he strongly opposed abortion and gun control. Heflin supported school prayer in public schools, and opposed laws banning discrimination on the basis of sexual orientation. He supported the Gulf War of 1991, and opposed cuts in defense spending. With Fritz Hollings of South Carolina, Heflin was one of only two Democrats in the Senate to vote against the Family and Medical Leave Act. He occasionally voted with Republicans on taxes.

On other economic issues, he was more allied with his party's populist wing. He voted against the North American Free Trade Agreement (NAFTA), the General Agreement on Tariffs and Trade (GATT), and attempts to weaken enforcement of consumer protection measures. He strongly supported affirmative action laws. He voted against confirmation of Clarence Thomas to the United States Supreme Court, citing Thomas's lack of experience.

In 1993, Heflin gave a memorable speech on the Senate floor in support of Senator Carol Moseley Braun's successful effort to deny renewal of a Confederate Flag design patent for the United Daughters of the Confederacy. Heflin spoke of his pride and love for his Confederate ancestors, his respect for the United Daughters of the Confederacy, and his conflict in breaking with them over this issue. But, he said:

We live in a nation that daily is trying to heal the scars that have occurred in the past. We're trying to heal problems that still show negative and ugly aspects in our world that we live in today, and perhaps racism is one of the great scars and one of the most serious illnesses that we suffer from still today.

Heflin lived at his long-time residence in Tuscumbia until his death on March 29, 2005, of a heart attack. He was survived by his wife, Elizabeth Ann, his son H. Thomas, Jr., known as Tom, and two grandchildren.

Heflin was the last Democrat to serve as a senator from Alabama until the swearing in of Doug Jones (winner of the December 2017 special election) on January 3, 2018, 21 years to the day after Heflin left the seat. (Note: Prior to 2017, Richard Shelby was the last Alabama Democrat elected to the Senate, in 1992, but he became a Republican in 1994.) Heflin had been a mentor to Jones, who worked for him as a senatorial aide.

== Honors ==
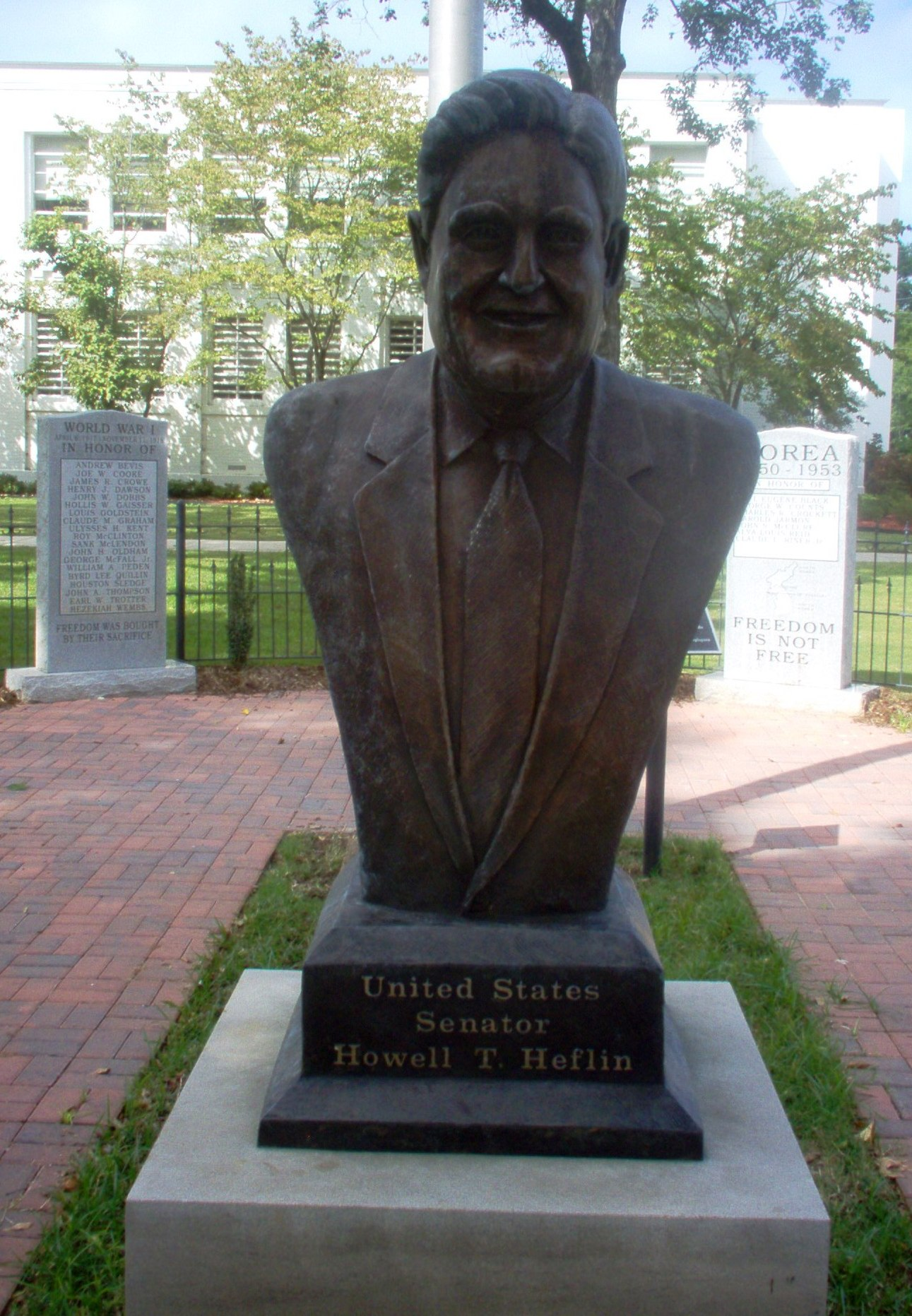
Memorial to Howell Heflin at the war memorial near the Colbert County Courthouse, Colbert County, Alabama

The University of Alabama School of Law has honored Heflin with the "Howell Heflin Conference Room" in the Bounds Law Library. Tuscumbia named a street "Howell Heflin Lane", in his honor. The Howell Heflin Lock and Dam in Alabama is named in his honor. The Howell T. Heflin Seminar room in the Birmingham-Southern College Library is also named in his honor.

The New York Times characterized him as the "conscience of the Senate".

== See also ==
- Conservative Democrats

== Notes ==
Party political offices
Preceded by John Sparkman	Democratic nominee for U.S. Senator from Alabama (Class 3); 1978, 1984, 1990	Succeeded by Roger Bedford, Jr.
Legal offices
Preceded by J. Ed Livingston	Chief Justice of the Alabama Supreme Court; 1971–1977	Succeeded by C. C. Torbert, Jr.
U.S. Senate
Preceded by John Sparkman	United States Senator (Class 2) from Alabama; 1979–1997; Served alongside: Donald W. Stewart, Jeremiah Denton, Richard Shelby	Succeeded by Jeff Sessions
Preceded by Warren Rudman	Chair of the Senate Ethics Committee; 1987–1992	Succeeded by Terry Sanford
