= William J. Cabaniss =

American politician (1938–2025)

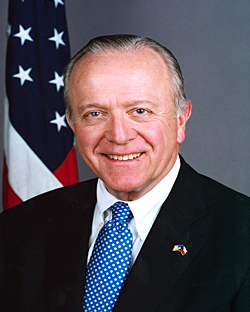

5th United States Ambassador to the Czech Republic
- In office January 13, 2004 – September 15, 2006
- President: George W. Bush
- Preceded by: Craig R. Stapleton
- Succeeded by: Richard Graber

Member of the Alabama Senate
- In office November 3, 1982 – November 7, 1990
- Preceded by: Dewey White
- Succeeded by: J. T. Waggoner
- Constituency: 11th district (1982–1983); 16th district (1983–1990)

Member of the Alabama House of Representatives from the 31st district
- In office November 8, 1978 – November 3, 1982
- Preceded by: Dewey White
- Succeeded by: Van Scott

Personal details
- Born: William Jelks Cabaniss Jr. July 11, 1938 Birmingham, Alabama, U.S.
- Died: February 2, 2025 (aged 86) Mountain Brook, Alabama, U.S.
- Party: Republican
- Spouse: Catherine Hood Caldwell
- Education: Vanderbilt University (BA)

Military service
- Allegiance: United States
- Branch: United States Army
- Years: 1960–1964
- Rank: First lieutenant

William Jelks Cabaniss Jr. (July 11, 1938 – February 2, 2025) was an American politician and diplomat who served as a member of both chambers of the Alabama Legislature and U.S. Ambassador to the Czech Republic in the George W. Bush administration.

== Early life and education ==
Cabaniss was born on July 11, 1938. He graduated with a Bachelor of Arts from Vanderbilt University in 1960 and entered the United States Army, where he served as a First Lieutenant with the Airborne Rangers. He was awarded the Army Commendation Medal in 1964, after a three-year tour of duty in Germany.

== Career ==
After leaving the Army, Cabaniss returned to Birmingham and began his business career with the Southern Cement Company Division of Martin Marietta Corporation. In 1971, he resigned from his position as Director of Market Development with Southern Cement and started his own company, Precision Grinding, Inc., after acquired the assets of a small metal grinding company, which he transformed into a steel plate processing and metal machining business.

Cabaniss, a Republican, served in the Alabama House of Representatives from 1978 to 1982 and the Alabama State Senate from 1982 to 1990. He ran unsuccessfully for the U.S. Senate in the 1990 election, losing to incumbent Democratic Senator Howell Heflin.

== Death ==
Cabaniss died on February 2, 2025, at the age of 86.

Alabama Senate
Preceded by Dewey A. White, Jr.	Member of the Alabama Senate from the 11th district 1982–1983	Succeeded by John A. Teague
Preceded by W. Ryan De Graffenried, Jr.	Member of the Alabama Senate from the 16th district 1983–1990	Succeeded by James T. Waggoner
Party political offices
Preceded by Albert L. Smith, Jr.	Republican nominee for U.S. Senator from Alabama (Class 2); 1990	Succeeded by Jeff Sessions
Diplomatic posts
Preceded by Craig R. Stapleton	United States Ambassador to the Czech Republic; 2004–2006	Succeeded by Richard Graber
