= 2023 Rhode Island's 1st congressional district special election =

- November 7, 2023

Rhode Island's 1st congressional district
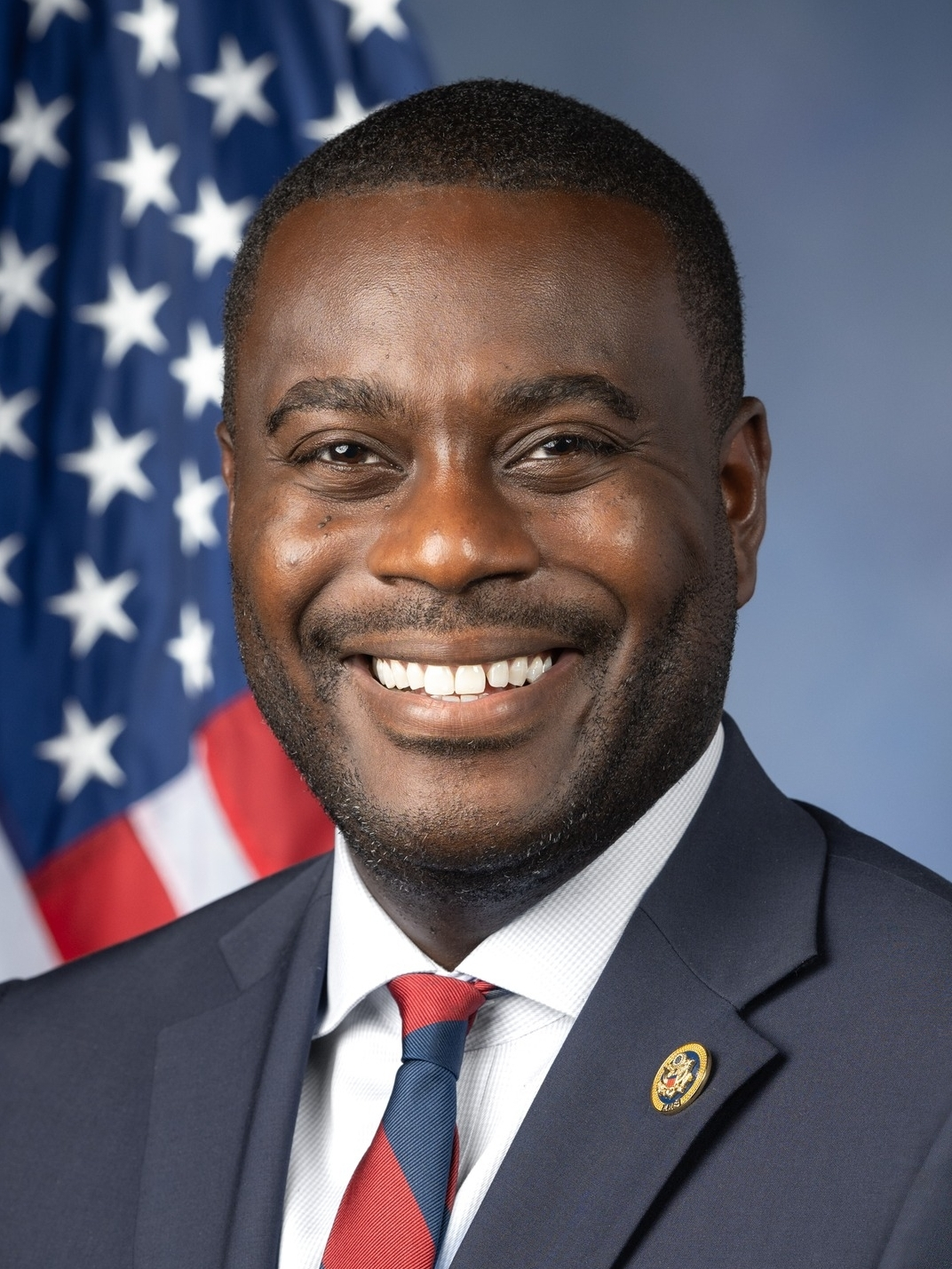

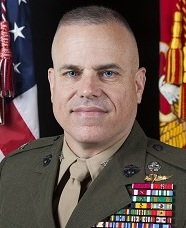
Nominee	Gabe Amo	Gerry Leonard Jr.
Party	Democratic	Republican
Popular vote	43,290	23,393
Percentage	64.7%	35.0%
- Municipality results Amo: 50–60% 60–70% 70–80% >90% Leonard: 50–60%
U.S. Representative before election
David Cicilline
Democratic
Elected U.S. Representative
Gabe Amo
Democratic

The 2023 Rhode Island's 1st congressional district special election was held on November 7, 2023. The seat became vacant following incumbent Democratic representative David Cicilline's resignation on May 31, 2023, to become the president and CEO of the Rhode Island Foundation. This was the first congressional special election in Rhode Island since the 1967 2nd district special election and the first special election in the 1st district since 1935.

The 1st district typically elects Democrats. Cicilline was re-elected with 64.0% of the vote in 2022, while Joe Biden won the district with 63.8% of the vote in 2020. The last time a Republican was elected to represent the 1st district was in 1992, when Ronald Machtley won re-election for a third term. Gabe Amo became the first African American to represent Rhode Island in Congress following the election. Amo has worked in different governmental roles, most recently in the Biden administration in the White House Office of Intergovernmental Affairs. Leonard served in the U.S. Marine Corps for more than 30 years, serving in Afghanistan, Iraq, Kuwait and Somalia.

== Democratic primary ==
=== Candidates ===
==== Nominee ====
- Gabe Amo, former deputy director of the White House Office of Intergovernmental Affairs (2021–2023)

==== Eliminated in primary ====
- Stephanie Beauté, insurance software executive and candidate for Rhode Island secretary of state in 2022
- Walter Berbrick, former Naval War College professor
- Sandra Cano, state senator from the 8th district (2019–2024)
- Stephen Casey, state representative from the 50th district (2013–present)
- Spencer Dickinson, former state representative from the 35th district (2011–2015), candidate for governor in 2018, and candidate for the 2nd district in 2022
- John Goncalves, Providence city councilor
- Sabina Matos, lieutenant governor of Rhode Island (2021–present)
- Ana Quezada, state senator from the 2nd district (2017–present)
- Aaron Regunberg, former state representative from the 4th district (2015–2019), nephew of U.S. Representative Brad Schneider, and candidate for lieutenant governor of Rhode Island in 2018
- Allen Waters, investment consultant, Republican nominee for this district in 2022 and for U.S. Senate in 2020

==== Withdrawn ====
- Nick Autiello, climate change activist, business executive, and former economic development staffer in the Raimondo administration (endorsed Matos)
- Pamela Azar, Lincoln town councilor (endorsed Quezada)
- Nathan Biah, state representative from the 3rd district (2021–present) (running for state senate)
- Donald Carlson, senior executive director of the Tsai Leadership Program at Yale Law School and former aide to then-U.S. Representative Joe Kennedy II (endorsed Cano, remained on ballot)
- Paul LeBon, author, former Nashua, New Hampshire, alderman, and nominee for Texas's 26th congressional district in 2002

==== Disqualified ====
- Marvin Abney, state representative from the 73rd district (2013–present)
- Mickeda Barnes, bus driver
- Kathleen Gaskell, office manager
- Larry Hutchinson Jr.
- Gregory Mundy, clinical project manager
- Bella Machado Noka, Narragansett elder
- Toni Sfameni
- Michael Tillinghast, catering server

==== Declined ====
- Karen Alzate, state representative from the 60th district (2019–present) (endorsed Cano)
- Gregg Amore, Rhode Island secretary of state (2023–present)
- Sam Bell, state senator from the 5th district (2019–present) (endorsed Cano)
- Roberto DaSilva, mayor of East Providence (2019–present)
- James Diossa, Rhode Island general treasurer (2023–present) (endorsed Cano)
- Louis DiPalma, state senator from the 12th district (2009–present) (endorsed Cano)
- Brendan Doherty, former superintendent of the Rhode Island State Police and Republican nominee for this district in 2012
- Jorge Elorza, former mayor of Providence (2015–2023)
- Dawn Euer, state senator from the 13th district (2017–present) (endorsed Cano)
- Helena Foulkes, corporate executive and candidate for governor of Rhode Island in 2022
- Don Grebien, mayor of Pawtucket (2011–present) (endorsed Cano)
- Meghan Kallman, state senator from the 15th district (2021–present) (endorsed Cano)
- Katherine Kazarian, state representative from the 63rd district (2013–present)
- Xay Khamsyvoravong, mayor of Newport (endorsed Amo)
- Nirva LaFortune, former Providence city councilor and candidate for mayor of Providence in 2022
- Valarie Lawson, state senator from the 14th district (2019–present) (endorsed Cano)
- Patrick Lynch, former attorney general of Rhode Island (2003–2011) (endorsed Amo)
- Dan McKee, governor of Rhode Island (2021–present)
- Cynthia Mendes, former state senator from the 8th district (2021–2023) and candidate for lieutenant governor of Rhode Island in 2022
- Jeff Mutter, mayor of Cumberland (endorsed Cano)
- Peter Neronha, attorney general of Rhode Island (2019–present)
- Joseph R. Paolino Jr., former U.S. ambassador to Malta (1994–1996) and former mayor of Providence (1984–1991)
- Clay Pell, lawyer, former deputy assistant secretary of education, and candidate for governor of Rhode Island in 2014
- Gina Raimondo, U.S. secretary of commerce (2021–present) and former governor of Rhode Island (2015–2021)
- Maria Rivera, mayor of Central Falls (2021–present)
- Joe Shekarchi, speaker of the Rhode Island House of Representatives (2021–present)
- Brett Smiley, mayor of Providence (2023–present)
- Angel Taveras, former mayor of Providence (2011–2015) and candidate for governor of Rhode Island in 2014

=== Endorsements ===
Nick Autiello (withdrawn)

Organizations

- LGBTQ Victory Fund (co-endorsement with Carlson)
Gabe Amo

Federal officials

- Ron Klain, former White House chief of staff (2021–2023)

U.S. representatives

- Patrick J. Kennedy, former U.S. representative from RI-01 (1995-2011)

Statewide officials

- Patrick Lynch, former attorney general of Rhode Island (2003–2011)

Local officials

- Xay Khamsyvoravong, mayor of Newport (2022–present)
- Jon Mitchell, mayor of New Bedford (2012–present)

Organizations

- Collective PAC
- Congressional Black Caucus PAC

Labor unions

- United Auto Workers Rhode Island

Newspapers

- East Bay Newspapers
Pamela Azar (withdrawn)

Organizations

- Reform Party
Walter Berbrick

Organizations

- New Politics
- VoteVets
Stephen Casey

Organizations

- Rhode Island Fraternal Order of Police
Sandra Cano

Statewide officials

- James Diossa, Rhode Island general treasurer (2023–present) (Cano's fiancé)

State legislators

- 13 state senators
- 6 (Note: 5 from Rhode Island, 1 from New Hampshire) state representatives

Local officials

- Don Grebien, mayor of Pawtucket (2010–present)
- Charles Lombardi, mayor of North Providence (2007–present)
- William Murray, former mayor of Cumberland (2015–2018)

Labor unions

- National Education Association Rhode Island
- Rhode Island Federation of Teachers and Health Professionals
- United Nurses and Allied Professionals

Individuals

- Donald Carlson, senior executive director of the Tsai Leadership Program at Yale Law School and former 2023 candidate for this seat
Donald Carlson (withdrawn)

U.S. representatives

- Jim Himes, U.S. representative from CT-4 (2009–present)

Local officials

- Annise Parker, former mayor of Houston (2000–2016) and president of LGBTQ Victory Fund

Organizations

- LGBTQ Victory Fund (co-endorsement with Autiello)
Sabina Matos

U.S. representatives

- Adriano Espaillat, U.S. representative from NY-13 (2017–present)
- Lois Frankel, U.S. representative from FL-22 (2013–present)
- Pat Ryan, U.S. representative from NY-18 (2022–present)
- Linda Sánchez, U.S. representative from CA-38 (2003–present)

Statewide officials

- Elizabeth H. Roberts, former lieutenant governor of Rhode Island (2007–2015)

State legislators

- Grace Diaz, state representative from the 11th district (2005–present)
- Ramon Perez, state representative from the 13th district (2017–2019, 2021–present)
- Myrth York, former state senator from the 2nd district (1991–1995)

Individuals

- Eva Longoria, actress and director
- Luis A. Miranda Jr., founder of Hispanic Federation and Latino Victory Fund board member

Organizations

- CHC BOLD PAC
- EMILY's List
- Latino Victory Fund
- NewDem Action Fund

Labor unions

- International Union of Painters and Allied Trades district council 11
- Laborers' International Union of North America
Ana Quezada

State legislators

- Jose Batista, state representative from the 12th district (2021–present)
- Jeanine Calkin, former state senator from the 30th district (2017–2018, 2021–2023) (her policy co-chair)
- Enrique Sanchez, state representative from the 9th district (2023–present)
- Scott Slater, state representative from the 10th district (2009–present)

Local officials

- Pamela Azar, Lincoln town councilor (2019–present) and former 2023 candidate for this seat
- Justin Roias, Providence city councilor from the 4th ward (2023–present)
Aaron Regunberg

U.S. senators

- Bernie Sanders, U.S. senator from Vermont (2007–present)

U.S. representatives

- Greg Casar, U.S. representative from TX-35 (2023–present)
- Rosa DeLauro, U.S. representative from CT-3 (1991–present)
- Jared Huffman, U.S. representative from CA-2 (2013–present)
- Ro Khanna, U.S. representative from CA-17 (2017–present)
- Alexandria Ocasio-Cortez, U.S. representative from NY-14 (2019–present)
- Delia Ramirez, U.S. representative from IL-3 (2023–present)
- Jamie Raskin, U.S. representative from MD-8 (2017–present)
- Jan Schakowsky, U.S. representative from IL-9 (2009–present)

State legislators

- J. Clement Cicilline, former state senator (1993–2003), uncle of David Cicilline
- Chris Larson, Wisconsin state senator from the 11th district (2011–present) and former Wisconsin senate minority leader
- Tiara Mack, member of the Rhode Island Senate from the 6th district (2021–present)
- Linda Ujifusa, state senator from the 50th district (2023–present)
- 10 state representatives

Local officials

- Susan Anderbois, Providence city councilor from the 3rd ward (2023–present)
- Helen Anthony, Providence city councilor from the 2nd ward (2019–present)
- Rachel Miller, Providence city council president (2023–present) from the 13th ward (2018–present)

Individuals

- Vanessa Carlton, singer
- Steven Donziger, human rights lawyer
- Jane Fonda, actress and activist

Labor unions

- Association of Flight Attendants
- Communications Workers of America Local 1400

Organizations

- 350.org Climate Action Rhode Island
- Center for Biological Diversity
- Climate Hawks Vote
- Congressional Progressive Caucus PAC
- Freethought Equality Fund
- Friends of the Earth Action
- Food & Water Action
- J Street PAC
- Joint Action Committee for Political Affairs
- Our Revolution
- Progressive Democrats of America
- Rhode Island Working Families Party
Declined to endorse

U.S. representatives

- David Cicilline, former U.S. representative from RI-01 (2011–2023)
- Brad Schneider, U.S. representative from IL-10 (2013–2015, 2017–present) (Regunberg's uncle)

Political parties

- Rhode Island Democratic Party

Labor unions

- Service Employees International Union

Organizations

- Rhode Island Democratic Socialists of America

Newspapers

- Beacon Communications
- The Boston Globe
- Breeze Publications
- Providence Business News
- The Providence Journal
- The Westerly Sun

=== Fundraising ===
Campaign finance reports as of August 16, 2023
Candidate	Raised	Spent	Cash on hand
Gabe Amo (D)	$604,406	$449,164	$155,242
Stephanie Beauté (D)	$16,201	$11,144	$5,056
Walter Berbrick (D)	$183,456	$132,976	$50,480
Sandra Cano (D)	$307,352 (Note: $80,000 of this total was self-funded by Cano)	$247,796	$59,556
Stephen Casey (D)	$87,008	$48,646	$1,817
John Gonclaves (D)	$190,236	$164,644	$25,592
Sabina Matos (D)	$578,972 (Note: $20,000 of this total was self-funded by Matos)	$452,718	$126,254
Ana Quezada (D)	$87,255	$57,869	$29,385
Aaron Regunberg (D)	$629,821	$438,556	$191,265
Source: Federal Election Commission

=== Debates and candidate forums ===
No.	Date	Host	Moderator	Link	Democratic	Democratic	Democratic	Democratic	Democratic	Democratic	Democratic	Democratic	Democratic	Democratic	Democratic	Democratic
Key: P Participant A Absent N Not invited I Invited W Withdrawn																
Key: P Participant A Absent N Not invited I Invited W Withdrawn					Gabe Amo	Stephanie Beauté	Walter Berbrick	Sandra Cano	Donald Carlson	Stephen Casey	Spencer Dickinson	John Goncalves	Sabina Matos	Ana Quezada	Aaron Regunberg	Allen Waters
1	Jul. 19, 2023	Ray-ality TV	Raymond Baccari Jr. Ryan Lukowicz	YouTube (part 1); YouTube (part 2)	P	P	P	P	P	P	P	P	P	P	P	P
2	Aug. 17, 2023	Roger Williams University	Edward Fitzpatrick; Steph Machado	YouTube	P	P	P	P	P	P	N	P	P	P	P	N
3	Aug. 22, 2023	Rhode Island College; Rhode Island PBS; The Providence Journal; The Public's Radio	Patrick Anderson; Ian Donnis	YouTube	P	P	P	P	P	P	N	P	P	P	P	N
4	Aug. 31, 2023	WJAR	Brian Crandall	YouTube	N	P	N	P	W	P	N	N	N	P	P	P
5	Sep. 1, 2023	WJAR	Brian Crandall	YouTube	P	N	P	N	W	N	P	P	P	N	N	N

=== Polling ===
Poll source	Date(s) administered	Sample size (Note: Key: A – all adults RV – registered voters LV – likely voters V – unclear)	Margin of error	Marvin Abney	Gabe Amo	Nick Autiello	Sandra Cano	Don Carlson	John Goncalves	Sabina Matos	Aaron Regunberg	Other	Undecided
	August 27, 2023	Carlson withdraws from the race											
Global Strategy Group (D) (Note: This poll was sponsored by Amo's campaign)	August 15–17, 2023	451 (V)	–	–	19%	–	11%	8%	–	11%	28%	8% (Note: "Another candidate not mentioned here" with 8%)	15%
	July 19, 2023	Autiello withdraws from the race											
	July 18, 2023	Abney is disqualified from the race											
Lake Research Partners (D) (Note: This poll was sponsored by Autiello's campaign)	July 12–16, 2023	300 (V)	–	4%	6%	5%	7%	2%	4%	20%	12%	–	33%
RMG Research (Note: This poll was sponsored by US Term Limits. While the group has not endorsed a candidate in this race, Amo has signed their term limits pledge.)	June 28–30, 2023	300 (LV)	± 5.7%	–	8%	–	–	3%	–	17%	22%	–	48%
Expedition Strategies (Note: This poll was sponsored by Matos's campaign)	June 5–8, 2023	600 (LV)	± 4.0%	4%	3%	3%	6%	2%	5%	22%	9%	4% (Note: Stephen Casey and Ana Quezada with 2%; Walter Berbick with 0%)	43%

=== Results ===
Primary results by municipality: Amo: 20–30%; 30–40%; 40–50%; 50–60%; Regunberg: 20–30%; Cano: 30–40%; Casey: 30–40%

Democratic primary results
Party	Candidate	Votes	%
Democratic	Gabe Amo	12,946	32.4
Democratic	Aaron Regunberg	9,960	24.9
Democratic	Sandra Cano	5,574	13.9
Democratic	Sabina Matos	3,210	8.0
Democratic	Stephen Casey	2,329	5.8
Democratic	Walter Berbrick	1,453	3.6
Democratic	Ana Quezada	1,415	3.5
Democratic	John Goncalves	1,118	2.8
Democratic	Donald Carlson (withdrawn)	690	1.7
Democratic	Allen Waters	503	1.3
Democratic	Stephanie Beauté	428	1.1
Democratic	Spencer Dickinson	354	0.9
Total votes		39,980	100.0

== Republican primary ==
=== Candidates ===
==== Nominee ====
- Gerry Leonard Jr., operations executive and retired U.S. Marine Corps officer

==== Eliminated in primary ====
- Terri Flynn, former Middletown town councilor

==== Disqualified ====
- Gary Fagnant, nurse
- William Lebron Jr.

==== Declined ====
- Robert Flanders, former associate justice of the Rhode Island Supreme Court (1996–2004) and nominee for U.S. Senate in 2018
- Aaron Guckian, fundraising consultant, former aide to then-Governor Donald Carcieri, and nominee for lieutenant governor of Rhode Island in 2022
- John Loughlin, former state representative from the 71st district (2005–2010) and nominee for this district in 2010
- Brian Newberry, state representative from the 48th district (2009–present) and former RI House minority leader (2011–2017)

=== Endorsements ===
Gerry Leonard Jr.

State legislators

- Jessica de la Cruz, minority leader of the Rhode Island Senate (2022–present) from the 23rd district (2019–present)

Political parties

- Rhode Island Republican Party

=== Debate and forum ===
2023 Rhode Island's 1st congressional district Republican primary debate and candidate forum
No.	Date	Host	Moderator	Link	Republican	Republican
Key: P Participant A Absent N Not invited I Invited W Withdrawn						
Key: P Participant A Absent N Not invited I Invited W Withdrawn					Terri Flynn	Gerry Leonard
1	Aug. 24, 2023	The Providence Journal; The Public's Radio; Rhode Island PBS	Patrick Anderson; Ian Donnis	YouTube	P	P
2	Sep. 1, 2023	WJAR	Gene Valicenti	YouTube	P	P

=== Fundraising ===
Campaign finance reports as of August 16, 2023
Candidate	Raised	Spent	Cash on hand
Gerry Leonard Jr. (R)	$122,221 (Note: $50,000 of this total was self-funded by Leonard)	$11,138	$111,082
Source: Federal Election Commission

=== Results ===
Primary results by municipality: Leonard Jr.: 50–60%; 60–70%; 70–80%; 80–90%; >90%

Republican primary results
Party	Candidate	Votes	%
Republican	Gerry Leonard Jr.	3,076	75.7
Republican	Terri Flynn	989	24.3
Total votes		4,065	100.0

== Independents ==
=== Disqualified ===
- Stephen Earle
- Joseph Jean-Philippe, community college instructor
- Jeffrey Lemire, construction worker and perennial candidate
- Richard O'Shea, nurse
- C. D. Reynolds
- Paul Rianna Jr., nursing assistant and candidate for governor of Rhode Island in 2022
- John Dale Ritchie
- Julian J. Smith, IT manager
- John Vitkevich, realtor and community activist

=== Declined ===
- Arlene Violet, former Republican attorney general of Rhode Island (1985–1987)

== General election ==
=== Predictions ===
Source	Ranking	As of
Inside Elections	Safe D	February 23, 2023
Sabato's Crystal Ball	Safe D	February 22, 2023
The Cook Political Report	Safe D	July 25, 2023
Politico	Safe D	August 29, 2023

=== Polling ===
Poll source	Date(s) administered	Sample size	Margin of error	Gabe Amo (D)	Gerry Leonard (R)	Undecided
Salve Regina University/Embold Research	October 12–17, 2023	386 (RV)	± 4.0%	46%	35%	15%

=== Results ===
2023 Rhode Island's 1st congressional district special election
Party	Candidate	Votes	%	±%
Democratic	Gabe Amo	43,290	64.73	+0.70
Republican	Gerry Leonard Jr.	23,393	34.98	−0.78
Write-in		193	0.29	+0.06
Total votes		66,876	100.00	
Democratic hold				

By county

County	Gabe Amo Democratic		Gerry Leonard Jr. Republican		Write-in		Margin		Total votes
County	#	%	#	%	#	%	#	%	Total votes
Bristol	7,465	67.16%	3,618	32.55%	33	0.30%	3,847	34.61%	11,116
Newport	10,025	62.97%	5,865	36.84%	31	0.19%	4,160	26.13%	15,921
Providence (part)	25,800	64.76%	13,910	34.92%	129	0.32%	11,890	29.85%	39,839
Total	43,290	64.73%	23,393	34.98%	193	0.29%	19,897	29.75%	66,876

== See also ==
- 2023 United States House of Representatives elections
- 118th United States Congress
- List of special elections to the United States House of Representatives
