= Rhode Island's 2nd Senate district =

American legislative district

Rhode Island's 2nd State Senate district
- Boundaries since 2022
Senator
Ana Quezada; D–Providence
- Registration: 57% Democratic; 7% Republican; 36% No party preference
- Demographics: 9% White; 12% Black; 71% Hispanic; 4% Asian; 1% Native American; 2% Multiracial
- Population (2023): 27,732
- Registered voters (May 2025): 14,297

Rhode Island's 2nd Senate district is one of 38 districts in the Rhode Island Senate. It has been represented by Democrat Ana Quezada since January 2017.

== Geography ==
Senate District 2 contains a portion of the municipality of Providence, the state's capital and largest city. It contains two of the most diverse neighborhoods in the city, those being Elmwood and Olneyville.

== History ==
In 1994, voters passed a constitutional referendum shrinking the size of the Rhode Island General Assembly, with Senate membership decreasing from 50 members to 38. The changes took effect after the 2002 redistricting cycle.

== List of members ==
- Ana Quezada (Democratic) 2017–present
- Juan Pichardo (Democratic) 2003–2017 (retired)
- John Roney (Democratic) 1995−2003
- Myrth York (Democratic) until 1995

== Past election results ==
=== Federal and statewide results ===
Year	Office	Results
2022	Governor	McKee 79.4 – 17.5%
2020	President	Biden 78.7 – 20.0%
2020	Senate	Reed 85.2 – 14.3%
2018	Senate	Whitehouse 90.8 – 8.9%
2018	Governor	Raimondo 81.0 – 11.4%
2016	President	Clinton 87.1 – 9.2%

=== 2022–present ===
2024 Rhode Island Senate District 2 general election
Party	Candidate	Votes	%	±%
Democratic	Ana Quezada (inc.)	5,096	95.79%	−0.68%
Write-in		224	4.21%	+0.68%
Total votes		5,320	100.00%	
Democratic hold				

2022 Rhode Island Senate District 2 general election
Party	Candidate	Votes	%	±%
Democratic	Ana Quezada (inc.)	2,979	96.47%	−0.87%
Write-in		109	3.53%	+0.87%
Total votes		3,088	100.00%	
Democratic hold				

=== 2012–2020 ===
2020 Rhode Island Senate District 2 general election
Party	Candidate	Votes	%	±%
Democratic	Ana Quezada (inc.)	6,225	97.34%	−0.05%
Write-in		170	2.66%	+0.05%
Total votes		6,395	100.00%	
Democratic hold				

2018 Rhode Island Senate District 2 general election
Party	Candidate	Votes	%	±%
Democratic	Ana Quezada (inc.)	5,037	97.39%	+0.03%
Write-in		135	2.61%	−0.03%
Total votes		5,172	100.00%	
Democratic hold				

2016 Rhode Island Senate District 2 general election
Party	Candidate	Votes	%	±%
Democratic	Ana Quezada	6,417	97.36%	+0.97%
Write-in		174	2.64%	−0.97%
Total votes		6,591	100.00%	
Democratic hold				

2014 Rhode Island Senate District 2 general election
Party	Candidate	Votes	%	±%
Democratic	Juan Pichardo (inc.)	4,373	96.39%	+15.02%
Write-in		164	3.61%	+3.21%
Total votes		4,537	100.00%	
Democratic hold				

2012 Rhode Island Senate District 2 general election
Party	Candidate	Votes	%	±%
Democratic	Juan Pichardo (inc.)	5,132	81.37%	−5.12%
Independent	Ramon A. Perez	715	11.34%	New
Independent	Luis E. Pimentel	435	6.90%	New
Write-in		25	0.40%	New
Total votes		6,307	100.00%	
Democratic hold				

=== 2002–2010 ===
2010 Rhode Island Senate District 2 general election
Party	Candidate	Votes	%	±%
Democratic	Juan Pichardo (inc.)	3,706	86.49%	−3.74%
Republican	Robert W. Kenny III	579	13.51%	+3.74%
Total votes		4,285	100.00%	
Democratic hold				

2008 Rhode Island Senate District 2 general election
Party	Candidate	Votes	%	±%
Democratic	Juan Pichardo (inc.)	5,669	90.23%	+2.42%
Republican	Brian P. Mayben	614	9.77%	−2.42%
Total votes		6,283	100.00%	
Democratic hold				

2008 Rhode Island Senate District 2 general election
Party	Candidate	Votes	%	±%
Democratic	Juan Pichardo (inc.)	4,223	87.81%	+0.96%
Republican	Donald J. Roach Jr.	586	12.19%	−0.56%
Total votes		8,545	100.00%	
Democratic hold				

2004 Rhode Island Senate District 2 general election
Party	Candidate	Votes	%	±%
Democratic	Juan Pichardo (inc.)	4,325	86.85%	+12.61%
Republican	Brian P. Mayben	635	12.75%	+7.16%
Write-in		20	0.40%	New
Total votes		5,753	100.00%	
Democratic hold				

2020 Rhode Island Senate District 2 general election
Party	Candidate	Votes	%	±%
Democratic	Juan Pichardo	3,518	74.24%	−25.76%
Independent	Rochelle Bates Lee	614	12.96%	New
Independent	Pedro J. Espinal	342	7.22%	New
Republican	Yvon Chancy	265	5.59%	New
Total votes		4,739	100.00%	
Democratic hold				

=== Until 2000 ===
2000 Rhode Island Senate District 2 general election
Party	Candidate	Votes	%	±%
Democratic	John Roney (inc.)	4,153	100.00%	+22.67%
Total votes		4,153	100.00%	
Democratic hold				

1998 Rhode Island Senate District 2 general election
Party	Candidate	Votes	%	±%
Democratic	John Roney (inc.)	2,674	77.33%	−0.89%
Green	Joshua T. Mandelbaum	775	22.41%	New
Write-in		9	0.26%	New
Total votes		3,458	100.00%	
Democratic hold				

1996 Rhode Island Senate District 2 general election
Party	Candidate	Votes	%	±%
Democratic	John Roney (inc.)	3,394	78.22%	+9.21%
Republican	Michael P. English	945	21.78%	−9.21%
Total votes		4,339	100.00%	
Democratic hold				

1994 Rhode Island Senate District 2 general election
Party	Candidate	Votes	%	±%
Democratic	John Roney	2,786	69.01%	−3.00%
Republican	Steven Frias	1,251	30.99%	+10.22%
Total votes		4,037	100.00%	
Democratic hold				

1992 Rhode Island Senate District 2 general election
Party	Candidate	Votes	%	±%
Democratic	Myrth York (inc.)	4,101	72.01%	−0.69%
Republican	Steven Frias	1,183	20.77%	−6.53%
Independent	Michael P. English	411	7.22%	New
Total votes		5,695	100.00%	
Democratic hold				

1990 Rhode Island Senate District 2 general election
Party	Candidate	Votes	%	±%
Democratic	Myrth York	2,802	72.70%	
Republican	William T. Cook	1,052	27.30%	
Total votes		3,854	100.00%	

== See also ==
- Rhode Island's 1st Senate district
- Rhode Island's 17th Senate district
