= Rhode Island's 1st Senate district =

American legislative district

Rhode Island's 1st State Senate district
- Boundaries since 2022
Senator
Jake Bissaillon; D–Providence
- Registration: 53% Democratic; 8% Republican; 39% No party preference
- Demographics: 39% White; 13% Black; 35% Hispanic; 6% Asian; 5% Multiracial
- Population (2023): 27,368
- Registered voters (May 2025): 14,503

Rhode Island's 1st Senate district is one of 38 districts in the Rhode Island Senate. It has been represented by Democrat Jake Bissaillon since December 2023.

== Geography ==
Precinct map of Senate District 1 (2022–2032)

Senate District 1 contains 13 precincts within the municipality of Providence, the state's capital and largest city.

== History ==
In 1994, voters passed a constitutional referendum shrinking the size of the Rhode Island General Assembly, with Senate membership decreasing from 50 members to 38. The changes took effect after the 2002 redistricting cycle.

== List of members ==
- Jake Bissaillon (Democratic) Dec. 2023–present
- Maryellen Goodwin (Democratic) 2005–Apr. 2023 (died)
- Rhoda Perry (Democratic) 2003–2005 (redistricted)
- Maryellen Goodwin (Democratic) 1987–2003 (redistricted)

== Past election results ==
=== Federal and statewide results ===
Year	Office	Results
2022	Governor	McKee 74.9 – 22.0%
2020	President	Biden 77.3 – 20.4%
2020	Senate	Reed 82.4 – 17.3%
2018	Senate	Whitehouse 81.2 – 18.4%
2018	Governor	Raimondo 72.4 – 18.6%
2016	President	Clinton 75.2 – 19.1%
2012	President	Obama 82.2 – 17.8%

=== 2022–present ===
2024 Rhode Island Senate District 1 general election
Party	Candidate	Votes	%	±%
Democratic	Jake Bissaillon (inc.)	5,773	95.42%	+12.64%
Write-in		277	4.58%	+3.76%
Total votes		6,050	100.00%	
Democratic hold				

2023 Rhode Island Senate District 1 special election
Party	Candidate	Votes	%	±%
Democratic	Jake Bissaillon	904	82.78%	+1.84%
Republican	Niyoka P. Powell	179	16.39%	New
Write-in		9	0.82%	+0.33%
Total votes		1,092	100.00%	
Democratic hold				

2022 Rhode Island Senate District 1 general election
Party	Candidate	Votes	%	±%
Democratic	Maryellen Goodwin (inc.)	3,138	80.94%	−16.01%
Independent	Niyoka P. Powell	720	18.57%	New
Write-in		19	0.49%	−2.56%
Total votes		3,877	100.00%	
Democratic hold				

=== 2012–2020 ===
2020 Rhode Island Senate District 1 general election
Party	Candidate	Votes	%	±%
Democratic	Maryellen Goodwin (inc.)	7,492	96.95%	−0.30%
Write-in		236	3.05%	+0.30%
Total votes		7,728	100.00%	
Democratic hold				

2018 Rhode Island Senate District 1 general election
Party	Candidate	Votes	%	±%
Democratic	Maryellen Goodwin (inc.)	5,452	97.25%	+14.57%
Write-in		154	2.75%	+1.84%
Total votes		5,606	100.00%	
Democratic hold				

2016 Rhode Island Senate District 1 general election
Party	Candidate	Votes	%	±%
Democratic	Maryellen Goodwin (inc.)	6,267	82.68%	−14.99%
Republican	Jeffrey O. Caminero	1,244	16.41%	New
Write-in		69	0.91%	−1.42%
Total votes		7,580	100.00%	
Democratic hold				

2014 Rhode Island Senate District 1 general election
Party	Candidate	Votes	%	±%
Democratic	Maryellen Goodwin (inc.)	4,488	97.67%	−0.39%
Write-in		107	2.33%	+0.39%
Total votes		4,595	100.00%	
Democratic hold				

2012 Rhode Island Senate District 1 general election
Party	Candidate	Votes	%	±%
Democratic	Maryellen Goodwin (inc.)	6,048	98.06%	+20.99%
Write-in		120	1.94%	New
Total votes		6,168	100.00%	
Democratic hold				

=== 2004–2010 ===
2010 Rhode Island Senate District 1 general election
Party	Candidate	Votes	%	±%
Democratic	Maryellen Goodwin (inc.)	3,466	77.07%	−7.81%
Republican	Anthony F. Demings	1,031	22.93%	+7.81%
Total votes		4,497	100.00%	
Democratic hold				

2008 Rhode Island Senate District 1 general election
Party	Candidate	Votes	%	±%
Democratic	Maryellen Goodwin (inc.)	5,631	84.88%	+2.15%
Republican	Anthony F. Demings	1,003	15.12%	−2.15%
Total votes		6,634	100.00%	
Democratic hold				

2008 Rhode Island Senate District 1 general election
Party	Candidate	Votes	%	±%
Democratic	Maryellen Goodwin (inc.)	4,215	82.73%	+6.72%
Republican	Donald C. Izzo Jr.	880	17.27%	+2.46%
Total votes		8,545	100.00%	
Democratic hold				

In 2004, Maryellen Goodwin was redistricted back to District 1, and the Senate was reduced from 50 to 38 members.

2004 Rhode Island Senate District 1 general election
Party	Candidate	Votes	%	±%
Democratic	Maryellen Goodwin (inc.)	4,373	76.01%	+6.38%
Republican	Donald C. Izzo Jr.	852	14.81%	−2.80%
Independent	Daniel J. Grzych	516	8.97%	New
Write-in		12	0.21%	New
Total votes		5,753	100.00%	
Democratic hold				

=== 2002 ===
In 2002, incumbent senator Maryellen Goodwin was redistricted to Senate District 4. Rhoda Perry, who represented District 3 until 2002, was elected from District 1.

2020 Rhode Island Senate District 1 general election
Party	Candidate	Votes	%	±%
Democratic	Rhoda Perry (inc.)	7,040	82.39%	+4.67%
Republican	Leo Trevino	1,505	17.61%	New
Total votes		8,545	100.00%	
Democratic hold				

=== Until 2000 ===
2000 Rhode Island Senate District 1 general election
Party	Candidate	Votes	%	±%
Democratic	Maryellen Goodwin (inc.)	3,069	77.72%	+2.25%
Independent	Daniel J. Grzych	880	23.28%	−0.99%
Total votes		3,949	100.00%	
Democratic hold				

1998 Rhode Island Senate District 1 general election
Party	Candidate	Votes	%	±%
Democratic	Maryellen Goodwin (inc.)	2,597	75.47%	−1.84%
Independent	Daniel J. Grzych	835	24.27%	+1.58%
Write-in		9	0.26%	New
Total votes		3,441	100.00%	
Democratic hold				

1996 Rhode Island Senate District 1 general election
Party	Candidate	Votes	%	±%
Democratic	Maryellen Goodwin (inc.)	3,032	77.31%	+11.42%
Independent	Daniel J. Grzych	890	22.69%	−11.42%
Total votes		3,922	100.00%	
Democratic hold				

1994 Rhode Island Senate District 1 general election
Party	Candidate	Votes	%	±%
Democratic	Maryellen Goodwin (inc.)	2,618	65.89%	+4.38%
Independent	Daniel J. Grzych	1,355	34.11%	+2.31%
Total votes		3,973	100.00%	
Democratic hold				

1992 Rhode Island Senate District 1 general election
Party	Candidate	Votes	%	±%
Democratic	Maryellen Goodwin (inc.)	2,979	61.51%	−38.49%
Independent	Daniel J. Grzych	1,540	31.80%	New
Independent	Mary C. Jones	324	6.69%	New
Total votes		4,843	100.00%	
Democratic hold				

1990 Rhode Island Senate District 1 general election
Party	Candidate	Votes	%	±%
Democratic	Maryellen Goodwin (inc.)	4,025	100.00%	
Total votes		4,025	100.00%	
Democratic hold				

== See also ==
- Rhode Island's 2nd Senate district
- Rhode Island's 17th Senate district
