= Gabe Amo =

American politician (born 1987)

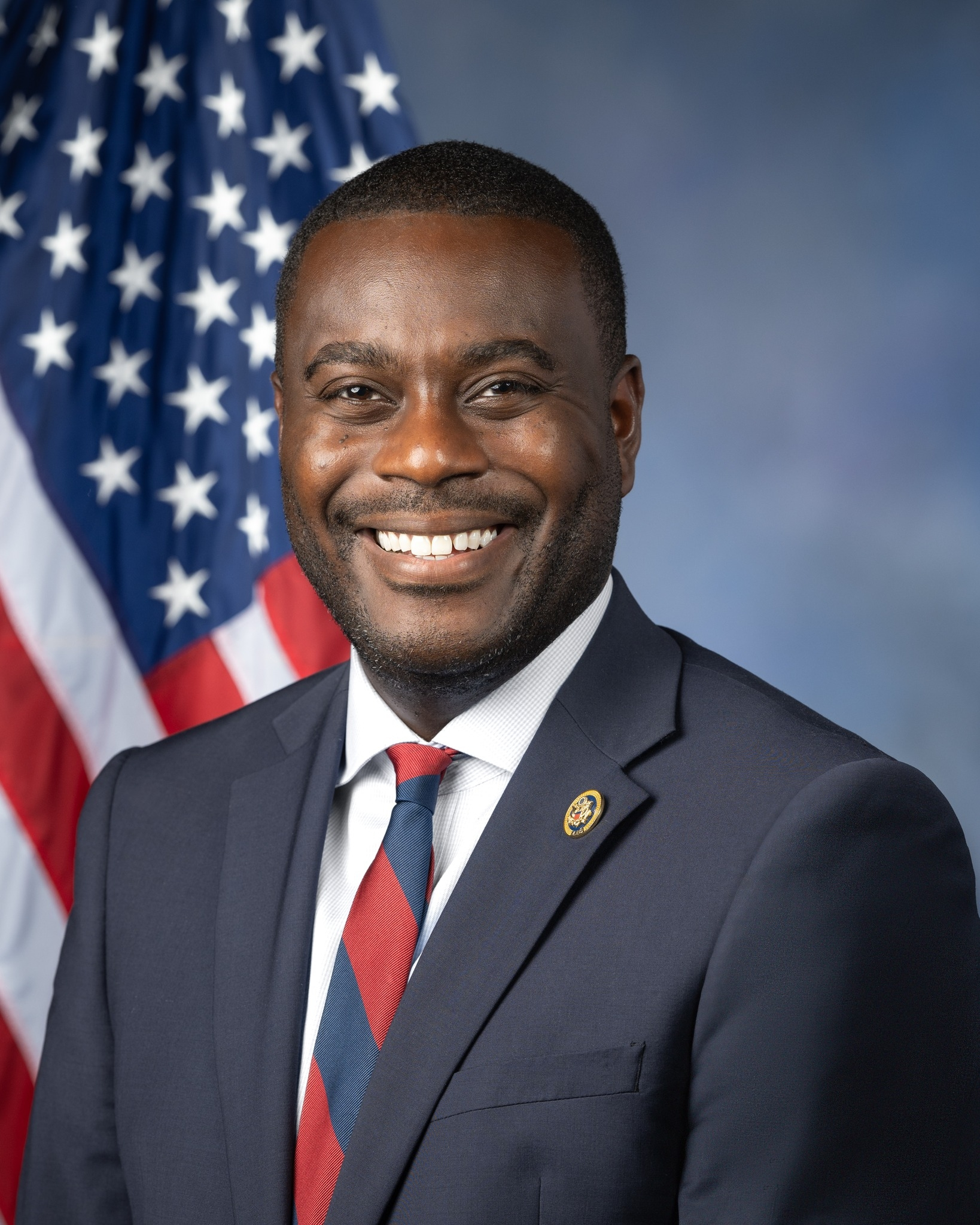
- Official portrait, 2024

Member of the U.S. House of Representatives from Rhode Island's 1st district
- Incumbent
- Assumed office November 7, 2023 (Note: Amo's official service begins on the date of the special election, while he was not sworn in until November 13, 2023.)
- Preceded by: David Cicilline

Personal details
- Born: Gabriel Felix Kofi Amo; December 11, 1987 (age 38) Pawtucket, Rhode Island, U.S.
- Party: Democratic
- Education: Wheaton College (BA); Merton College, Oxford (MSc)
- Website: House website Campaign website

Gabriel Felix Kofi Amo (/ˈɑːmoʊ/ AH-moh; born December 11, 1987) is an American politician serving as the U.S. representative for Rhode Island's 1st congressional district since 2023.

Before running for Congress, Amo worked in the Biden administration as the deputy director of the White House Office of Intergovernmental Affairs. He has also worked in the Obama administration, on several Democratic political campaigns, and in Rhode Island governor Gina Raimondo's administration.

== Early life and education ==
Amo was born and raised in Pawtucket, Rhode Island. His father and mother immigrated to Rhode Island from Ghana and Liberia, respectively. His mother is a nurse and his father owns a liquor store. He graduated from the Moses Brown college preparatory school in Providence, Rhode Island, where he was part of the student senate and received the Rhode Island Secretary of State's Civic Leadership Award. He also was selected to participate in the United States Senate Youth Program in Washington, D.C.

Amo earned a Bachelor of Arts from Wheaton College in Massachusetts, where he studied political science and graduated Phi Beta Kappa and magna cum laude. He also was a member of the student government association. He received a Truman Scholarship, a Public Policy and International Affairs Fellowship, and a Marshall Scholarship to study comparative social policy at Merton College, Oxford.

== Early career ==
In college, Amo volunteered on Sheldon Whitehouse's 2006 U.S. Senate campaign and then on Barack Obama's 2008 presidential campaign. He worked in the Office of Public Engagement and Intergovernmental Affairs in the Obama administration, serving as a liaison to governors and other state officials. He was also a national political coordinator for Obama's 2012 re-election campaign.

Amo served as Governor Gina Raimondo's principal advisor on outreach to Rhode Island's local government, business, and faith communities, and worked as a senior advisor on her 2018 re-election campaign. He returned to national politics as a strategist and program advisor on Joe Biden's 2020 presidential campaign and later served on his transition team. He then served as the special assistant and deputy director of the White House Office of Intergovernmental Affairs, working as the principal liaison to mayors and local elected officials.

== U.S. House of Representatives ==
=== 2023 special election ===
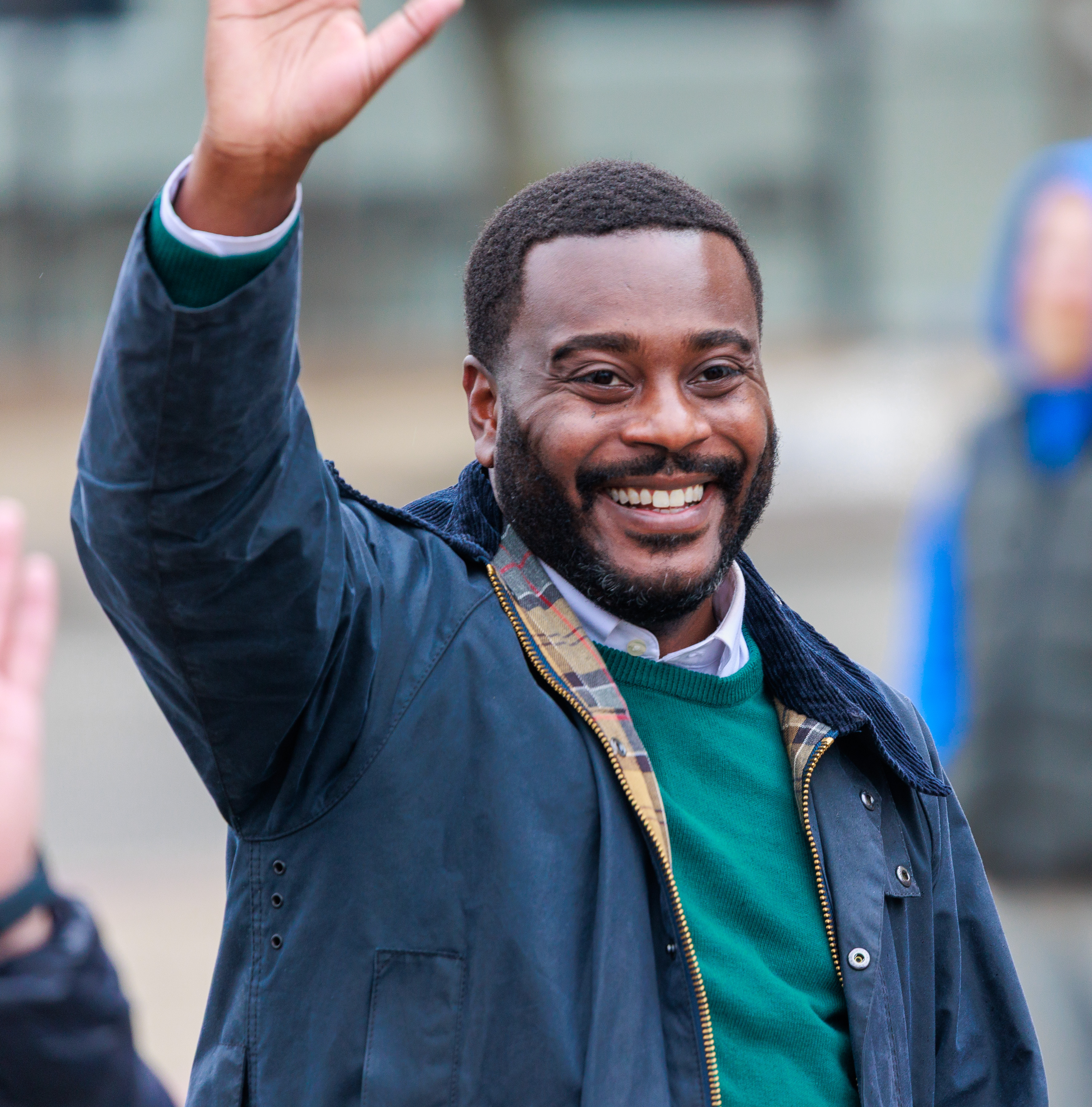
Amo in the 2025 Saint Patrick's Day parade in his hometown of Pawtucket

Amo left his White House job to run in the 2023 special election for Rhode Island's 1st congressional district, after incumbent representative David Cicilline announced his resignation from Congress to run the non-profit Rhode Island Foundation. Amo's campaign focused on protecting Social Security, Medicare, and abortion rights, while tackling gun violence and climate change. He received endorsements from the Congressional Black Caucus, former Rhode Island representative Patrick J. Kennedy, and former White House chief of staff Ron Klain. He also was supported by outside spending from Democrats Serve PAC and Collective PAC.

Amo was criticized for accepting over $20,000 from federal lobbyists representing major corporations, including Fox Corporation, Eli Lilly and Company, Philip Morris USA, Marathon Petroleum, and others. His receipts also included more than $8,000 from lobbyists for Wall Street firms and banks, such as Bank of America, JPMorgan Chase, Mastercard, and Bitcoin. His primary campaign received more than $600,000 in donations in total. In late August, a poll conducted for his campaign showed him in second place.

In September 2023, in an upset, Amo won the Democratic primary to become the party's nominee for Rhode Island's 1st congressional district. The general election was held on November 7. Amo won the election, becoming the first person of color elected to represent Rhode Island in Congress. He was officially sworn into Congress on November 13, 2023.

=== 2024 ===
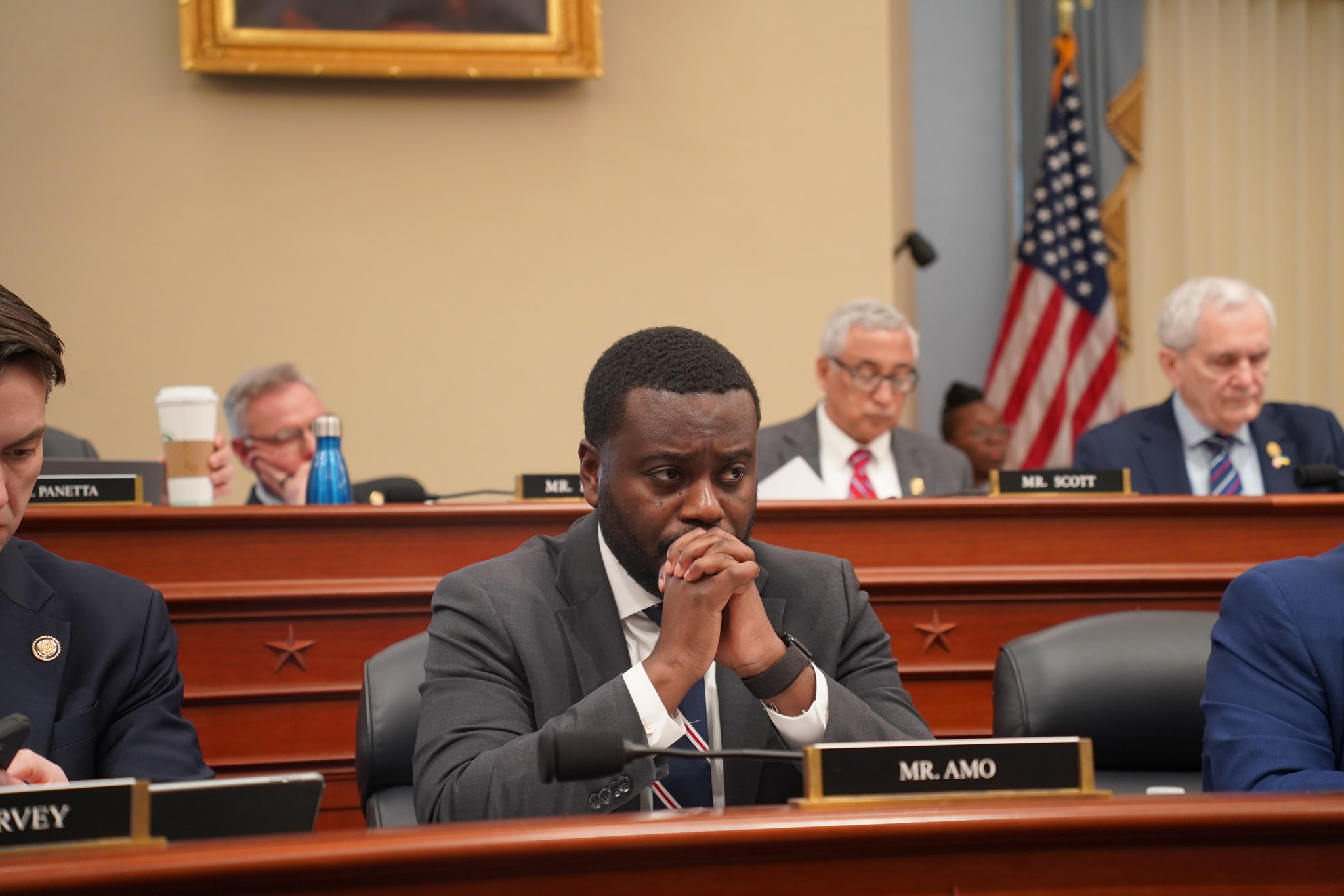
Amo during a House Budget Committee hearing in February 2025.

On November 5, 2024, Amo won re-election to his house seat defeating Republican Allen Waters 63% to 32%

=== Committee assignments ===
For the 119th Congress:

- Committee on the Budget
- Committee on Foreign Affairs
  - Subcommittee on East Asia and Pacific
  - Subcommittee on Europe
- Committee on Science, Space, and Technology
  - Subcommittee on Environment (Ranking Member)

=== Caucus memberships ===
- Future Forum
- House Hunger Caucus
- House Bipartisan Task Force For Combating Antisemitism
- Congressional Equality Caucus
- Congressional Caucus on Armenia
- Congressional Black Caucus
- Congressional Ukraine Caucus
- Labor Caucus
- House Baltic Caucus
- Congressional Arts Caucus

== Political positions ==
Amo voted in favor of three military aid package supplementals for Ukraine, Israel, and Taiwan respectively in April 2024, along with most Democrats.

In November 2025, following the election of Zohran Mamdani as mayor of New York City, Amo voted in favor of a Republican-led resolution condemning socialism.

== Personal life ==
Amo is Catholic.

In 2017, Amo received Higher Ground International's Clan Chief Award. In 2019, he received the distinguished Young Alumnus/a Award from Moses Brown School. In 2022, he was the Ghana Diaspora Public Affairs Collective's distinguished honoree at the Golden Gala and Awards Symposium, honoring senior Ghanaian-American government officials.

== Electoral history ==
2023 Rhode Island's 1st congressional district Democratic primary
Party	Candidate	Votes	%
Democratic	Gabe Amo	12,946	32.4
Democratic	Aaron Regunberg	9,960	24.9
Democratic	Sandra Cano	5,574	13.9
Democratic	Sabina Matos	3,210	8.0
Democratic	Stephen Casey	2,329	5.8
Democratic	Walter Berbrick	1,453	3.6
Democratic	Ana Quezada	1,415	3.5
Democratic	John Goncalves	1,118	2.8
Democratic	Donald Carlson (withdrawn)	690	1.7
Democratic	Allen Waters	503	1.3
Democratic	Stephanie Beauté	428	1.1
Democratic	Spencer Dickinson	354	0.9
Total votes		39,980	100.0

2023 Rhode Island's 1st congressional district special election
Party	Candidate	Votes	%	±%
Democratic	Gabe Amo	43,290	64.73%	+0.70
Republican	Gerry Leonard Jr.	23,393	34.98%	−0.78
Write-in		193	0.29%	+0.06
Total votes		66,876	100.00	
Democratic hold				

2024 Rhode Island's 1st congressional district general election
Party	Candidate	Votes	%	±%
Democratic	Gabe Amo (incumbent)	139,352	63.02%	−1.71
Republican	Allen Waters	70,742	31.99%	−2.99
Independent	CD Reynolds	10,463	4.73%	−N/A
Write-in		561	0.25%	−0.04
Total votes		221,118	100.00	
Democratic hold				

== See also ==
- List of African-American United States representatives

U.S. House of Representatives
Preceded by David Cicilline	Member of the U.S. House of Representatives from Rhode Island's 1st congressional district 2023–present	Incumbent
U.S. order of precedence (ceremonial)
Preceded by Jennifer McClellan	United States representatives by seniority 356th	Succeeded by Celeste Maloy
