= Robert Britto =

American politician

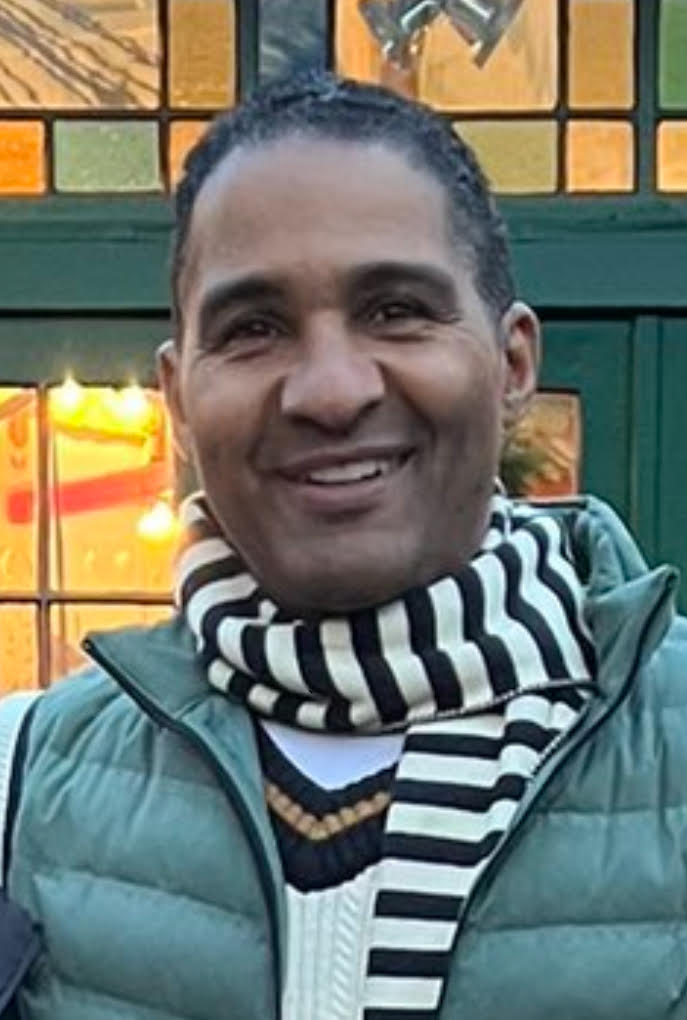

Member of the Rhode Island Senate from the 18th district
- Incumbent
- Assumed office January 3, 2023
- Preceded by: Cynthia Mendes

President of the East Providence City Council
- In office January 2019 – January 2023
- Succeeded by: Robert P. Rodericks

Member of the East Providence City Council from Ward 1
- In office January 2015 – January 2023
- Succeeded by: Frank Rego

Personal details
- Born: July 1, 1963 (age 63) Providence, Rhode Island, U.S.
- Party: Democratic
- Spouse: Danielle
- Children: 4
- Education: Stonehill College

Robert Britto (born 1963), is an American politician and retail project manager. A Democrat, he represents District 18 in the Rhode Island State Senate. Britto previously served as the President of the City Council and as a city councilor of East Providence.

== Early life and education ==
Britto was born on July 1, 1963, in Providence, Rhode Island. He graduated Stonehill College with a major in international studies and soon returned to the Ocean State.

== Career ==
Britto has worked in project management throughout his career, specifically in the retail and design field. As of 2023, Britto is employed by the Rhode Island Housing and Mortgage Finance Corporation as a design and construction specialist. The agency works to create healthy, attractive, and affordable homes across Rhode Island.

== East Providence City Council ==
Britto was elected to the East Providence City Council in 2014, representing Ward 1. He was re-elected shortly thereafter and was selected to be the council's Chairman in 2019.

Britto's work has been generally celebrated on the council. Britto focused on traffic control, the promotion of diversity, raising teacher pay, and creating economical growth in the city's waterfront district. Britto was also a key factor in a city charter change which shifted its executive authority to a mayor instead of a city manager.

== Rhode Island Senate ==
Britto was sworn into the Rhode Island Senate in January 2023. He is a member of the Senate Committee on Finance and the Senate Committee on Environment and Agriculture.

== Elections ==
=== 2012 State House election ===
Britto ran in the Democratic primary for Rhode Island's 63rd state house district in 2012. He placed second, losing to Katherine Kazarian by 220 votes.

=== 2022 State Senate election ===
Britto announced his campaign for the Rhode Island State Senate, succeeding Cynthia Mendes, the incumbent State Senator, who had launched an unsuccessful bid for the state's Lieutenant Governor post. Britto faced special education teacher and progressive activist, Gregory Greco, who was running with the support of Senator Mendes, in the Democratic primary. Britto edged out a thin primary win against Greco, with only a 326-vote margin.

Britto heralded over Republican Anna Peters in the November general election.

== Personal life and non-profit work ==
Britto has lived in the Rumford section of East Providence for over twenty years with his wife, Danielle. They have four children.

Britto has been involved in numerous non-profit organizations including the Fox Point Boys and Girls Club, Fox Point Senior Citizens Center, and the Pew Charitable Trust Civic Entrepreneur initiative. Britto often assists with community events, including the Rumford Tree Lighting and the Rumford Holiday Festival.

Britto has also worked as a football coach for the Boys and Girls Club and as a basketball coach for Providence Country Days School.
