= Jake Bissaillon =

American politician from Rhode Island (born 1987)

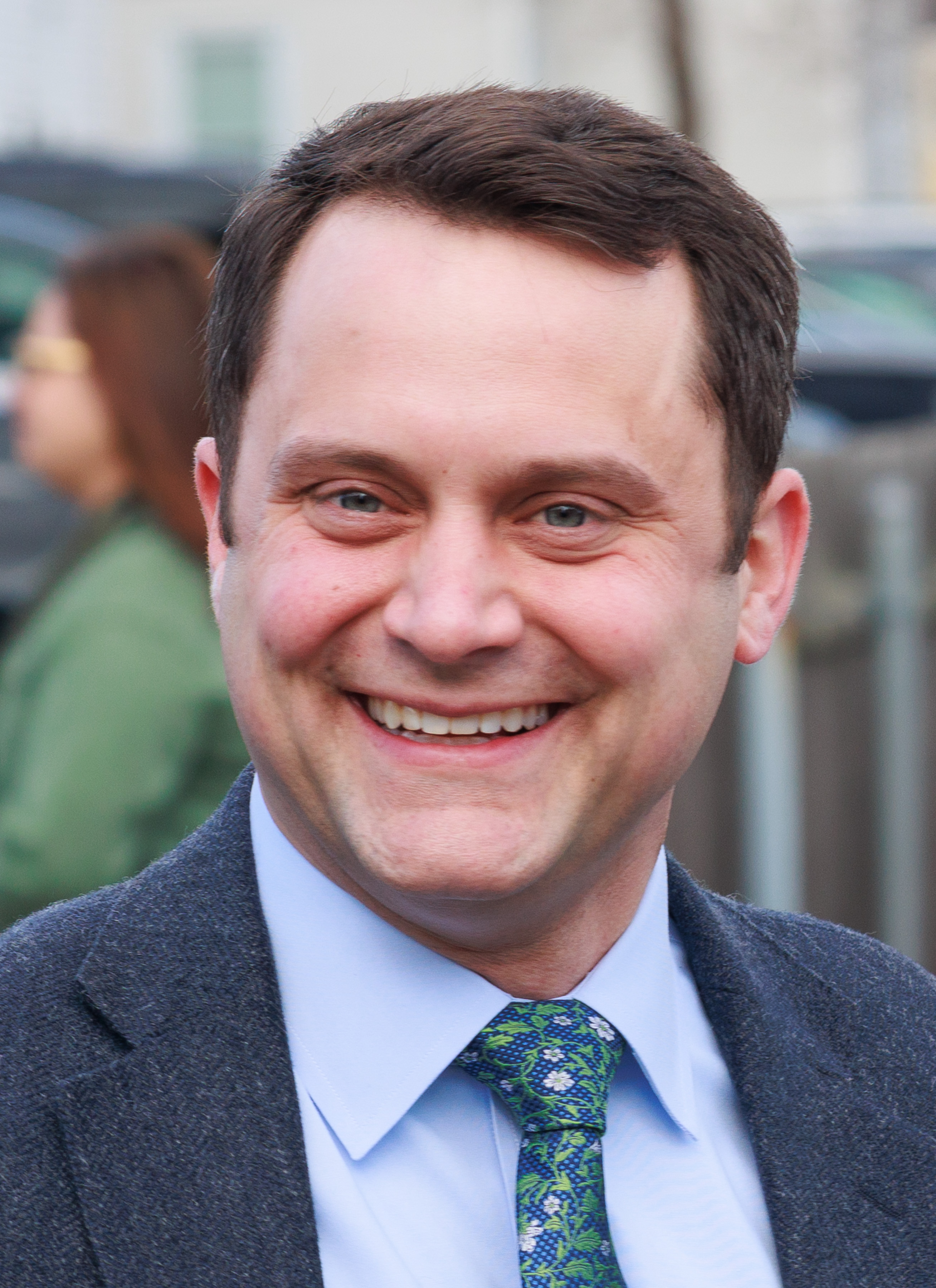
- Bissaillon in 2025

Member of the Rhode Island Senate from the 1st district
- Incumbent
- Assumed office December 8, 2023
- Preceded by: Maryellen Goodwin

Personal details
- Born: April 6, 1987 (age 39) Lynn, Massachusetts, U.S.
- Party: Democratic
- Education: Providence College (BA, MBA); Roger Williams University (JD)

Jacob Bissaillon (born April 6, 1987) is an American politician and attorney serving as the State Senator for Rhode Island's 1st Senate district. A Democrat, he was elected in 2023 to succeed the late Maryellen Goodwin. Prior to joining the Senate, Bissaillon served as Chief of Staff to Senate President Dominick J. Ruggerio and has held leadership roles in state and local government. He is also the CEO of Justice Assistance, a nonprofit that provides support services to justice-involved individuals.

== Early life and education ==
Bissaillon was born on April 6, 1987, in Lynn, Massachusetts, and raised in Merrimac, Massachusetts. He is the eldest of three children born to Ernie and Ellen Bissaillon, both educators. He has a younger sister, Madeline, and a younger brother, McGrath.

Bissaillon went to Immaculate Conception School in Newburyport, Massachusetts before attending St. John's Preparatory School, where he graduated in 2005. A member of the National Honor Society, Bissaillon was a Catholic Conference All-Star and competed on the Cross Country, Indoor Track, and Outdoor Track teams.

He went on to earn a bachelor's degree from Providence College in 2009, followed by an MBA in 2010. He later obtained a Juris Doctor from Roger Williams University School of Law. He is licensed to practice law in Rhode Island and Massachusetts.

== Career in Public Administration ==
Bissaillon's career in public administration began in 2011 when he was appointed Chief of Staff to the Providence City Council, where he managed legislative affairs and advised the council's 15 members. During his tenure, he played a key role in responding to the city's 2011 fiscal crisis, overseeing budget analysis, tax policy, and economic stabilization efforts.

From 2014 to 2016, while attending Roger Williams University School of Law, Bissaillon worked as a policy analyst for the Rhode Island House of Representatives, where he provided legislative research, developed policy proposals, and authored reports on regulatory issues. He was later promoted to Deputy Communications Director, helping to lead media strategies for the Speaker of the House Nicholas Mattiello and senior leadership.

In 2017, Bissaillon joined the Rhode Island Senate as Legal Counsel to Senate Majority Leader Michael McCaffrey, where he helped draft legislation, build legislative support, and negotiate key policy initiatives. He played a central role in major legislative efforts, including criminal justice reform and law enforcement accountability.

By 2021, he was appointed Chief of Staff to Senate President Dominick J. Ruggerio, serving as the Senate's senior political advisor. In this role, he managed Senate operations, directed a team of over 50 employees, and coordinated legislative priorities with government agencies and stakeholders.

== Political career ==
In 2023, following the passing of Senator Maryellen Goodwin, Bissaillon announced his candidacy for the special election in Rhode Island's 1st Senate District. Bissaillon said his decision to run for the Rhode Island Senate was based on continuing the legacy of the late Senator Maryellen Goodwin and address community issues such as housing, education, and public safety. Running in a four-way Democratic Primary that included incumbent Rhode Island State Representative Nathan Biah, Bissaillon garnered more than 50% of the vote. Bissaillon won the General Election decisively with 66% of the vote against Republican opponent Niyoka Powell.

After his election, Bissaillon resigned from his role as Chief of Staff and was appointed CEO of Justice Assistance, a nonprofit organization dedicated to supporting individuals navigating the criminal justice system.

== Electoral history ==
Special Democratic Primary for Rhode Island Senate District 1
| Party | Candidate | Votes | % |
|---|---|---|---|
| Democratic | Jake Bissaillon | 752 | 53.4% |
| Democratic | Nathan Biah | 344 | 24.4% |
| Democratic | Michelle Rivera | 268 | 19.0% |
| Democratic | Mario Mancebo | 45 | 3.2% |

Special General Election for Rhode Island Senate District 1
| Party | Candidate | Votes | % |
|---|---|---|---|
| Democratic | Jake Bissaillon | 904 | 82.8% |
| Republican | Niyoka Powell | 179 | 16.4% |
| Other | Write in | 9 | 0.8% |
