= Aaron Regunberg =

American progressive activist and politician

Member of the Rhode Island House of Representatives from the 4th district
- In office January 6, 2015 – January 1, 2019
- Preceded by: Gordon Fox
- Succeeded by: Rebecca Kislak

Personal details
- Born: January 26, 1990 (age 36) Chicago, Illinois, U.S.
- Party: Democratic
- Relatives: Brad Schneider (uncle)
- Education: Brown University (BA); Harvard University (JD)

Jonathan Aaron Regunberg (born January 26, 1990) is an American lawyer and progressive politician who represented the 4th District in the Rhode Island House of Representatives from 2015 to 2019. He ran for lieutenant governor of Rhode Island in 2018, and for the U.S. Congress in 2023, but lost both elections.

Regunberg is a climate change activist, and is currently the director of the Climate Accountability Project at Public Citizen. He has written articles and commentary for many progressive publications, and co-hosts the Fighting Fascism podcast for The Nation magazine.

== Early life and education ==
Regunberg is a native of Chicago. His father, Jonathan Regunberg, died in a plane crash before Aaron was born. Regunberg's grandfather was born in Germany, and immigrated to the United States in 1948 after surviving the Holocaust. Regunberg's uncle is U.S. Representative Brad Schneider from Illinois's 10th congressional district Aaron and his sister were raised by their mother, Erica Regunberg, in the Ravenswood neighborhood of Chicago.

Regunberg graduated magna cum laude from Brown University in 2012 with a Bachelor of Arts degree in political science. While at Brown, Regunberg co-founded the Providence Student Union, a youth-led public school student advocacy organization that has organized around issues including ethnic studies curricula, infrastructure repairs, free student bus passes, and an end to school closings and high-stakes testing.

Regunberg attended Harvard Law School, receiving a J.D. in 2022.

== Political career ==
=== Rhode Island House of Representatives ===
In 2014, Regunberg was elected to serve Rhode Island House District 4 on the East Side of Providence.

==== Elections ====
In the race for Rhode Island House District 4, Regunberg won 51.5% of the vote in the Democratic primary against challengers Heather Tow-Yick and Miriam Ross, who won 33.9% and 14.6%, respectively. He received the endorsement of the Progressive Democrats of Rhode Island, Clean Water Action, Planned Parenthood, and progressive labor organizations. He went on to defeat independent candidate Ethan Gyles in the general election, 83% to 17%. Regunberg ran unopposed in the Democratic primary and in the general election for Rhode Island House District 4.

==== Tenure ====
During his first term as state Representative, Regunberg introduced and passed legislation raising Rhode Island's tipped minimum wage for the first time in 20 years, established online voter registration, and created new renewable energy programs. He also introduced and passed legislation to guarantee earned paid sick days for over 100,000 Rhode Islanders, and pushed for a state-level carbon pricing system, single-payer healthcare system, and a more progressive tax system, among other proposals. He also chaired a special legislative study commission to reform the use of solitary confinement in Rhode Island.

Regunberg served as a member of the Rules Committee for the Democratic National Convention in July 2016, where he was a leader in the campaign to reform the Democratic Party's use of superdelegates in future presidential nominating contests.

After Donald Trump's election in 2016, Regunberg co-founded Resist Hate RI, a coalition of activists and organizations that mobilized hundreds of Rhode Island residents to take state and federal action in opposition to the Trump administration. He introduced legislation that would divest Rhode Island from any companies that contracted to help build Trump's proposed border wall with Mexico.

Regunberg received a 74% score from Common Cause Rhode Island in their 2015-2016 legislative scorecard, and an A rating from the Environmental Council of Rhode Island.

==== Committee assignments ====
2015

For the 2015 legislative session, Regunberg served on the following Rhode Island House of Representatives committees:

- Environment and Natural Resources
- Health, Education and Welfare

2017

During the 2017 legislative session, Regunberg served on the following Rhode Island House of Representatives committees:

- Environment and Natural Resources
- Labor

=== 2018 campaign for lieutenant governor ===
In late October 2017, Regunberg announced that he would run to become the lieutenant governor of Rhode Island in the 2018 election. He ran against incumbent lieutenant governor Dan Mckee in the Democratic primary. In his announcement speech, Regunberg said that if elected, he would be a voice "for all of the Rhode Islanders who can’t afford that State House lobbyist," and campaigned on a progressive platform, including as one of the earliest supporters of a Green New Deal. His bid received national attention when CNN named it one of the "9 Democratic primaries to watch in 2018."

Regunberg's campaign was endorsed by many progressive organizations and politicians throughout Rhode Island.

In March 2018, Regunberg received the endorsement of Providence Mayor Jorge Elorza.

Regunberg was defeated in the Democratic primary election by incumbent Dan McKee, receiving 49% of the vote to McKee's 51%.

After the election, Regunberg served as a Senior Policy Advisor to Providence Mayor Jorge Elorza. In the summer of 2019, he was arrested as a part of a Never Again Action protest against President Donald Trump's immigration reforms.

=== 2023 congressional campaign ===
Regunberg was a candidate in the 2023 special election for Rhode Island's 1st congressional district. Leaving his job as a legal clerk in U.S. District Court in Providence to run for the open seat, he was endorsed by Senator Bernie Sanders, Representative Alexandria Ocasio-Cortez, the Working Families Party, Congressman Jamie Raskin, and the Congressional Progressive Caucus. He was also endorsed by several local officials, including former state senator J. Clement “Bud” Cicilline, the uncle of former Rep. David Cicilline. Following his endorsement of Regunberg, former Rep. Cicilline stated that Regunberg reminded him of his nephew.

Despite several election prognosticators viewing Regunberg as a favorite, he was defeated by Gabe Amo in the September 5 primary.

== Writing and podcast ==
Regunberg is a contributing editor for The New Republic magazine, which he has written for since 2021. He has written articles and commentary for many other progressive publications, including The Nation, Rolling Stone, The Guardian, and Jacobin, as well as for mainstream news outlets such as Newsweek and The Boston Globe. He also has published articles in a number of environmental legal journals.

Regunberg also co-hosts the Fighting Fascism podcast for The Nation magazine.
