= Dawn Euer =

American politician (born 1979)

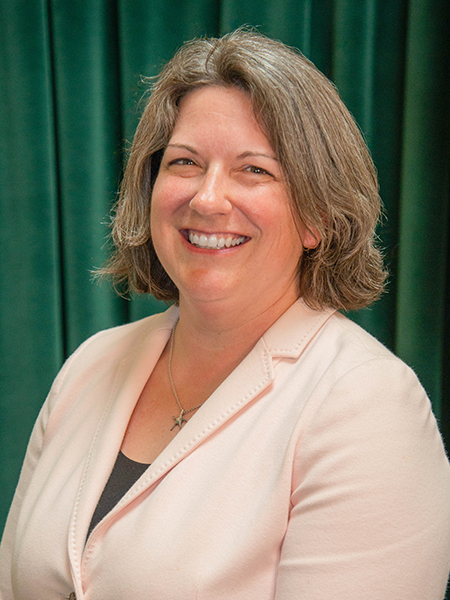
- Senator Dawn Euer

Member of the Rhode Island Senate from the 13th district
- Incumbent
- Assumed office September 5, 2017
- Preceded by: M. Teresa Paiva-Weed

Personal details
- Born: June 14, 1979 (age 47)
- Party: Democratic
- Education: University of Minnesota (BA); Roger Williams University (JD)

Dawn M. Euer is an American attorney and Democratic member of the Rhode Island Senate, representing District 13 since September 5, 2017. She was first elected in a special election on August 22, 2017 to the upper chamber of the Rhode Island General Assembly, succeeding former State Senator M. Teresa Paiva-Weed.

Euer won a full term in the Rhode Island Senate on November 6, 2018. Her constituency includes Jamestown and Newport.

On May 2, 2026, Euer announced her 2026 re-election campaign for the 2026 election cycle.

== Early life and education ==
Euer was born on June 14, 1979. She graduated from the University of Minnesota in 2007 and earned her J.D. from Roger Williams University in 2010.

== Career Prior to Politics ==
Prior to her 2017 special election win into the Rhode Island Senate in 2017, Euer was a prominent advocate in Rhode Island and served as the Deputy Campaign Director for Rhode Islanders United for Marriage. She worked on the campaign for the Community College of Rhode Island adjunct faculty to unionize in 2014. Euer has also served on the City of Newport's Energy & Environment Commission, advising the City Council on renewable energy and sustainable planning. She was previously Board Chair of Bike Newport and was a founding member of the Environmental Justice League of Rhode Island and Climate Jobs RI.

== Rhode Island Senate ==
In 2017, Euer made her first bid for elective office when she decided to run for an open seat in the Rhode Island Senate that M. Teresa Paiva Weed had vacated to become President of the Hospital Association of Rhode Island.

After emerging from the special Democratic primary for District 13's vacant seat in the Rhode Island Senate on July 18, 2017, which she won with about 47 percent of the vote, Euer prevailed in the August 22 general election with over 61 percent of the vote. She was sworn into the Rhode Island Senate on September 5, 2017 and represents Newport and Jamestown, Rhode Island. Euer was reelected to a full term in the Rhode Island Senate on November 6, 2018 with 71.6 percent of the vote.

In the Rhode Island Senate, she is a member of three Senate Committees: Senate Committee on Judiciary; Senate Committee on Special Legislation & Veterans Affairs; and Senate Committee on Rules, Government Ethics and Oversight.

== Legislative Priorities & Accomplishments ==
Senator Euer's top legislative priorities include: 1. Environmental protection and climate change mitigation; 2. Housing affordability; 3. Healthcare access.

In 2019, Euer played a key role in passing the Reproductive Privacy Act, which preserved the protections of Roe v. Wade into Rhode Island state law. Prior to the Reproductive Privacy Act passing, abortion was listed in the Rhode Island Criminal Code. That same year, she championed the Student Loan Bill of Rights, a consumer protection measure for student loan borrowers, which became law. Additionally, she was recognized by the Audubon Society of Rhode Island as Legislator of the Year. In 2019, She also helped pass legislation to improve protections for animals in commercial breeding operations. In 2019, she also opposed efforts to move money away from bicycle and pedestrian bicycle infrastructure safety programs.

In 2021, Euer led the passage of the Act on Climate, the most sweeping climate change law ever enacted in Rhode Island. This landmark legislation commits the state to achieving net-zero greenhouse gas emissions by 2050 and requires the state to come up with a plan to address climate change. As Chair of the Senate Committee on Environment and Agriculture, Senator Euer emphasized the Act's dual benefits: addressing the climate crisis and stimulating economic growth through the creation of green jobs. That same year, She was recognized by Clean Water Action as an Environmental Champion for her environmental advocacy. She received a national award from the Humane Society of the United States for her efforts on animal welfare legislation. She was honored by U.S. Senator Sheldon Whitehouse with a Service Recognition Award, which was formally entered into the congressional record. She additionally represented Rhode Island at the international COP26 Climate Summit in Glasgow, Scotland, participating in discussions on state-level climate leadership.

In 2022, Euer successfully sponsored the Let RI Vote Act, a law designed to make voting more accessible while safeguarding election integrity. In that year, she was selected as USA TODAY's Women of the Year honoree for Rhode Island. Additionally, She received a Legislator of the Year honor from the Clean Water Association for her climate-related work.

Also in 2022, Euer successfully championed legislation to enhance Rhode Island's participation in the offshore wind industry while also removing excess utility profits. At the time she said: "As we transition to a clean energy economy, it's vital that we are not recreating systems that give windfall profits to corporations on the shoulders of consumers".

In 2023, Common Cause RI presented Euer with their Excellence in Public Service Award, noting her work on expanding voting rights.

In 2024, Euer sponsored two significant pieces of legislation that were signed into law: the Energy Storage Systems Act and the Health Care Provider Shield Act. In that year, the Rhode Island Medical Society honored her with a Civic Leadership Award for her efforts to protect both patients and healthcare providers.

== Rhode Island Senate Leadership Roles ==
In the 2020 election cycle, the Rhode Island Political Cooperative defeated multiple incumbents, including the then-Chair of the Senate Committee on Finance Bill Conley. The following January, Euer was selected by then-Senate President Dominick Ruggerio to be the Chair of the Senate Committee on Environment and Agriculture.

In January 2022, Euer was elevated to serve as the Chair of the Senate Committee on Judiciary for the 2022-2023 legislative term. The end of that legislative term was marked by the declining health of then-Senate President Dominick Ruggerio.

In the Fall of 2024, Euer served as Co-Chair of the Rhode Island Constitutional Convention Commission.

During the November 2024 Senate Democratic Caucus, Euer nominated Ryan Pearson to replace Dominick Ruggerio as Senate President due to Ruggerio's ongoing absences from the Senate. At the start of the 2025 legislative term, it was announced that Euer was being replaced as Chair of the Senate Committee on Judiciary.

Euer continues to be a strong advocate for utility reform, environmental protection, affordable housing, and government transparency.

== Electoral history ==
Rhode Island State Senate: Special District 13 Democratic Primary Election, 2017
Party	Candidate	Votes	%
Democratic	Dawn M. Euer	1,162	47.04
Democratic	David Charles Hanos, Jr.	578	23.40
Democratic	John G. Florez	443	17.94
Democratic	David J. Allard	287	11.62

Rhode Island State Senate: Special District 13 General Election, 2017
Party	Candidate	Votes	%
Democratic	Dawn M. Euer	2,217	61.16
Republican	Michael W. Smith	1,309	36.11
Independent	Kimberly A. Ripoli	74	2.04
Green	Gregory W. Larson	18	0.50
Write-In	Write-In	7	0.19

Rhode Island State Senate: District 13 General Election, 2018
Party	Candidate	Votes	%
Democratic	Dawn M. Euer	7,166	71.6
Republican	Matthew Paul Perry	2,827	28.3
Write-In	Write-In	12	0.1

Rhode Island State Senate: District 13 General Election, 2020
Party	Candidate	Votes	%
Democratic	Dawn M. Euer	10,104	96.8
Write-In	Write-In	330	3.2

Rhode Island State Senate: District 13 General Election, 2022
Party	Candidate	Votes	%
Democratic	Dawn M. Euer	6,529	70.7
Republican	David A. Quiroa	2,685	29.1
Write-In	Write-In	16	0.2

Rhode Island State Senate: District 13 General Election, 2024
Party	Candidate	Votes	%
Democratic	Dawn M. Euer	8,380	70.3
Republican	David A. Quiroa	3,519	29.5
Write-In	Write-In	25	0.2
