= Cynthia Mendes =

American politician (born 1980)

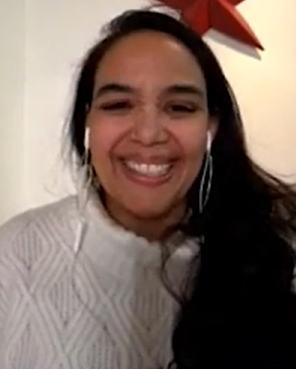
- Mendes in 2022

Member of the Rhode Island Senate from the 18th district
- In office January 5, 2021 – January 2023
- Preceded by: William Conley Jr.
- Succeeded by: Robert Britto

Personal details
- Born: June 14, 1980 (age 46)
- Party: Democratic
- Education: Community College of Rhode Island (AS)

Cynthia M. Mendes (born June 14, 1980) is an American politician who formerly served as a member of the Rhode Island Senate from the 18th district. Elected in November 2020, she assumed office on January 5, 2021, and left office in January 2023. She is a member of the Democratic Party.

== Early life and education ==
Mendes was born to a mother with Puerto Rican background from New Bedford, Massachusetts, and a father of Cape Verdean background. Mendes said she was raised in "a very conservative Christian environment" and attended the Word of Life Bible Institute, which she described as a "conservative Christian college". She earned an associate degree in social sciences from the Community College of Rhode Island. She is also a certified orthodontic assistant and dental radiology technician.

== Career ==
From 2004 to 2017, Mendes was a clinical supervisor at an orthodontics clinic in Barrington, Rhode Island. She later worked as a manager at Big Brothers Big Sisters of Rhode Island. In the 2020 elections, Mendes ran for the Rhode Island Senate seat in the 18th district, which includes the cities of East Providence and Pawtucket, and she obtained the endorsement of the progressive Rhode Island Political Cooperative. She defeated incumbent William Conley Jr. in the Democratic primary in what The Boston Globe deemed as an upset victory. She was elected to the state senate in November 2020 and assumed office on January 5, 2021.

Mendes unsuccessfully ran for lieutenant governor of Rhode Island in the 2022 election. By this time, she was working for the progressive group Renew New England. During the race, Mendes expressed support for having abortions covered by Medicaid and state insurance, but was later criticized for anti-abortion social media posts from 2014 to 2015. In defense of the posts, she stated on Twitter that "I'm not ashamed of my past. I had a journey into this movement." She further stated that "Today I am proudly, and strongly, pro-choice".

In the 2024 presidential election, Mendes endorsed author Marianne Williamson's presidential bid.

== Personal life ==
Mendes previously used the last name Buono from a past marriage. Registered as a Republican in East Providence until 2016, Mendes later wrote in "libertarian" in an election, and in 2019 switched affiliations to the Democratic Party.
