= Maryellen Goodwin =

American politician (1964–2023)

Member of the Rhode Island Senate from the 1st district
- In office January 2005 – April 15, 2023
- Preceded by: Rhoda Perry
- Succeeded by: Jake Bissaillon

Member of the Rhode Island Senate from the 4th district
- In office January 2003 – January 2005
- Preceded by: Dominick J. Ruggerio
- Succeeded by: Dominick J. Ruggerio

Member of the Rhode Island Senate from the 1st district
- In office January 1987 – January 2003
- Succeeded by: Rhoda Perry

Personal details
- Born: September 27, 1964 Providence, Rhode Island, U.S.
- Died: April 15, 2023 (aged 58) Providence, Rhode Island, U.S.
- Party: Democratic
- Education: Rhode Island College

Maryellen Goodwin (September 27, 1964 – April 15, 2023) was an American politician and a Democratic member of the Rhode Island Senate representing District 24 since January 2005. Goodwin served consecutively from January 1987 until January 2005 in the District 1 and District 4 seats.

== Background ==
Goodwin was born in Providence, Rhode Island, in 1964. Her father, Thomas N. Goodwin, was a state senator and owned a funeral home. Goodwin earned her BA degree from Rhode Island College.

== Career ==
Goodwin was elected to the Rhode Island State Senate in 1986, and eventually rose to be the Democratic whip. She supported bills that required employers to provide paid sick leave for workers, and guaranteed more nurses for care homes. She also supported red flag laws, and sponsored reforms that expanded laws against domestic violence.

In 2019, Goodwin was diagnosed with colorectal cancer. She became an advocate for early screening for the disease. In 2021, the state legislature passed the Maryellen Goodwin Colorectal Cancer Screening Act, which required insurers in the state to cover the full costs of tests for people aged 45 and older.

== Personal life ==
Goodwin lived in Providence, where she was a member of St. Patrick Church. She died from cancer at her home on April 15, 2023, at the age of 58. At the time of her death, she was in a relationship with former Lieutenant Governor Charles Fogarty.

== Elections ==
- 2012 Goodwin was unopposed for both the September 11, 2012 Democratic Primary, winning with 1,240 votes, and the November 6, 2012 General election, winning with 6,048 votes.
- 1980s Goodwin initially won election in District 1 in the November 4, 1986 General election and was re-elected in the November 8, 1988 General election.
- 1990 Goodwin won the September 11, 1990 Democratic Primary and was unopposed for the November 6, 1990 General election, winning with 4,025 votes.
- 1992 Goodwin won the September 15, 1992 Democratic Primary and won the three-way November 3, 1992 General election with 2,979 votes (61.5%) against Independent candidates Daniel Grzych and Mary Jones.
- 1994 Goodwin was unopposed for the September 13, 1994 Democratic Primary and returning 1990 challenger Daniel Grzych ran as in Independent, setting up a rematch; Goodwin won the November 8, 1994 General election with 2,618 votes (65.9%) against Grzych.
- 1996 Goodwin was challenged in the September 10, 1996 Democratic Primary, winning with 1,312 votes (80.2%); returning challenger Daniel Grzych ran as an Independent, setting up their third contest. Goodwin won the November 5, 1996 General election with 3,032 votes (77.3%) against Grzych.
- 1998 Goodwin was unopposed for the September 15, 1998 Democratic Primary, winning with 1,372 votes, and Daniel Grzych ran as an Independent for their fourth contest; Goodwin won the November 3, 1998 General election with 2,597 votes (75.7%) against Grzych.
- 2000 Goodwin was unopposed for both the September 12, 2000 Democratic Primary, winning with 1,043 votes, and Daniel Grzych ran as an Independent for their fifth contest. Goodwin won the November 7, 2000 General election with 3,069 votes (77.7%) against Grzych.
- 2002 Redistricted to District 4, and with incumbent Democratic Senator Dominick J. Ruggerio redistricted to District 6, Goodwin faced fellow incumbent Senator Catherine Graziano (who had been redistricted from District 5) in the September 10, 2002 Democratic Primary, winning with 2,213 votes (55.1%), and was unopposed for the November 5, 2002 General election, winning with 4,742 votes.
- 2004 Redistricted back to District 1, and with incumbent Democratic Senator Rhoda Perry redistricted back to District 3, Goodwin was unopposed for the September 14, 2004 Democratic Primary, winning with 648 votes; Daniel Grzych ran as an Independent for their sixth contest. Goodwin won the three-way November 2, 2004 General election with 4,373 votes (76.0%) against Republican nominee Donald Izzo and Independent Grzych.
- 2006 Goodwin and returning 2004 Republican challenger Donald Izzo were both unopposed for their September 12, 2006 primaries, setting up a rematch; Goodwin won the November 7, 2006 General election with 4,215 votes (82.7%) against Izzo.
- 2008 Goodwin was challenged in the September 9, 2008 Democratic Primary, winning with 986 votes (68.6%), and won the November 4, 2008 General election with 5,631 votes (84.9%) against Republican nominee Anthony Demings, who had run for a House seat in 2004.
- 2010 Goodwin was unopposed for the September 23, 2010 Democratic Primary, winning with 2,131 votes, and won the November 2, 2010 General election with 3,466 votes (77.1%) against Independent candidate Richard Corso.
