= Juan Pichardo =

American politician (born 1966)

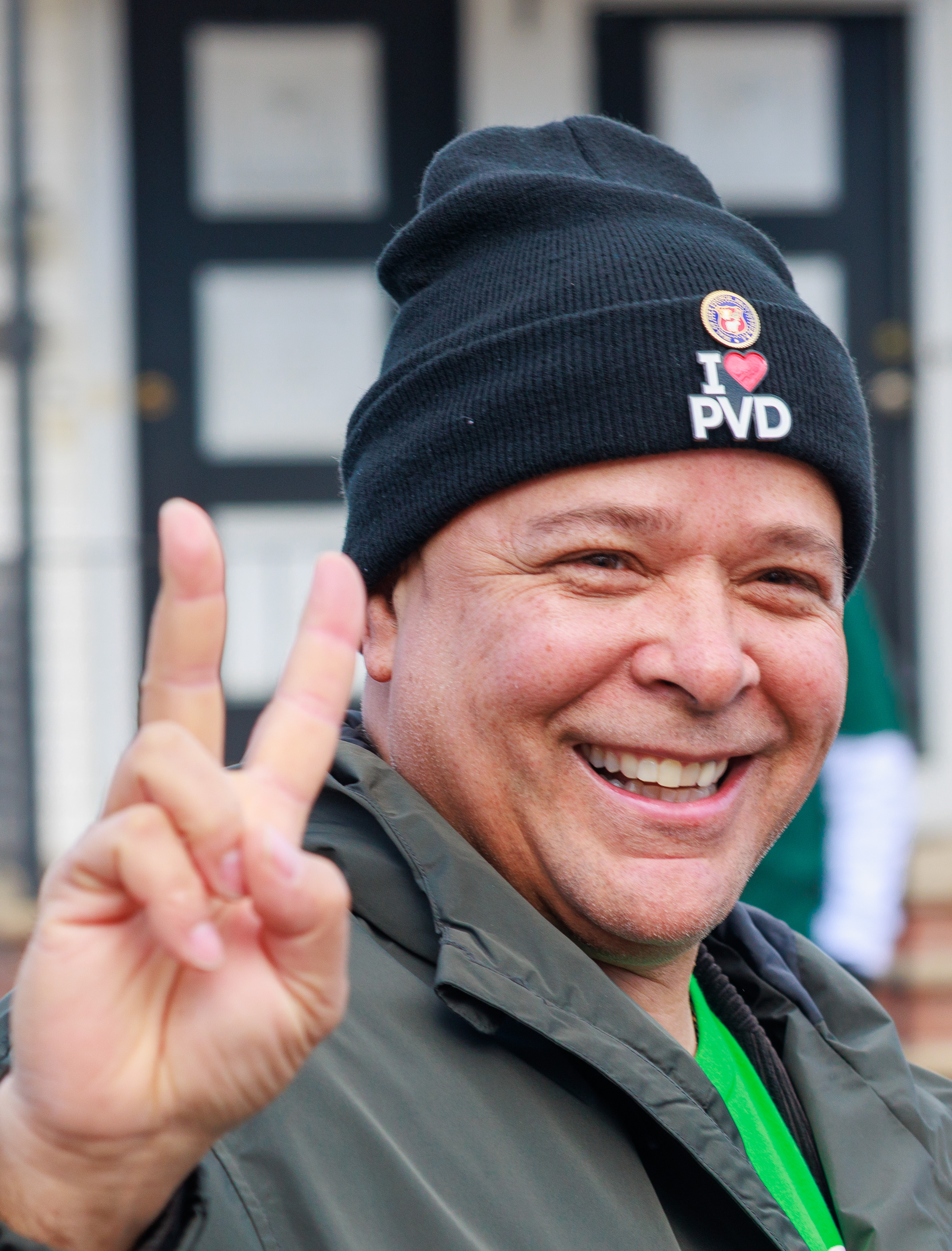
- Pichardo in 2025

Member of the Providence City Council from Ward 9
- Incumbent
- Assumed office January 2, 2023
- Preceded by: Carmen Castillo

Member of the Rhode Island Senate from the 2nd district
- In office January 2003 – January 3, 2017
- Preceded by: John Roney
- Succeeded by: Ana Quezada

Personal details
- Born: October 21, 1966 (age 59) Dominican Republic
- Party: Democratic
- Education: Community College of Rhode Island; Rhode Island College
- Website: juanmpichardo.com

Military service
- Branch/service: Air National Guard
- Rank: Master Sergeant

Juan M. Pichardo (born October 21, 1966) is a Dominican American politician. A Democrat, he was a member of the Rhode Island Senate who represented District 2 from January 2003 to 2017.

== Education ==
Pichardo earned his AA degree from the Community College of Rhode Island and his BA from Rhode Island College.

== Elections ==
- 2000 Pichardo challenged District 10 Democratic Senator Robert Kells in the September 12, 2000 Democratic Primary, but lost to Senator Kells, who won re-election in the November 7, 2000 General election against Republican nominee Ellen O'Hara.
- 2002 Redistricted to District 2, and with incumbent Democratic Senator John Roney leaving the Legislature, Pichardo won the September 10, 2002 Democratic Primary with 2,222 votes (58.2%), defeating incumbent Democratic Senator Charles D. Walton, and won the four-way November 5, 2002 General election with 3,518 votes (74.2%) against Independent candidates Rochelle Bates Lee, Pedro Espinal, and Republican nominee Yvon Chancy.
- 2004 Pichardo was challenged in the September 14, 2004 Democratic Primary, winning with 1,687 votes (73.3%), and won the November 2, 2004 General election with 4,325 votes (86.8%) against Republican nominee Brian Mayben, who had run for Senate in 2002 and House in 1996 and 1998.
- 2006 Pichardo was unopposed for the September 12, 2006 Democratic Primary, winning with 1,474 votes, and won the November 7, 2006 General election with 4,223 votes (87.8%) against Republican nominee Donald Roach.
- 2008 Pichardo and returning 2004 Republican challenger Brian Mayben both won their September 9, 2008 primaries, setting up a rematch; Pichardo won the November 4, 2008 General election with 5,669 votes (90.2%) against Mayben.
- 2010 Pichardo was challenged in the September 23, 2010 Democratic Primary, winning with 2,480 votes (74.9%), and was unopposed for the November 2, 2010 General election, winning with 3,706 votes (86.5%) against Republican nominee Robert Kenny.
- 2012 Pichardo was unopposed for the September 11, 2012 Democratic Primary, winning with 1,332 votes; returning 2010 Democratic Primary challenger Luis Pimental, ran as an Independent, setting up a rematch. Pichardo won the three-way November 6, 2012 General election with 5,132 votes (81.4%) against Independents Ramon Perez and Pimental.
- 2022 Pichardo was elected to the Providence City Council to represent Ward 9.

In 2023, Pichardo was fined by the R.I. Board of Elections for a "large discrepancy” in his campaign account. Pichardo called the error an "honest oversight" and paid the fine in full.
