= Margaret M. Jacoby Observatory =

Observatory in Rhode Island, US

- Organization: Community College of Rhode Island
- Location: Warwick, Rhode Island, United States
- Coordinates: 41°42′52″N 71°28′57″W
- Weather: See the Clear Sky Chart
- Established: 1978
- Website: http://www.ccri.edu/physics/observatory.html

Telescopes
- 16" Meade: Schmidt-Cassegrain

Margaret M. Jacoby Observatory is an astronomical observatory owned and operated by the Community College of Rhode Island. It opened in 1978 and is located in Warwick, Rhode Island, United States. The observatory was renamed in 1995 to honor Prof. Margaret M. Jacoby, the founder of the college's physics department, who secured the funding for its construction. The original 14" aperture telescope was replaced with a 16" Schmidt-Cassegrain telescope in 2009. The observatory also hosts public open nights (generally weekly) and supports instruction in introductory astronomy, training community college students to operate and utilize the telescope. In addition to public outreach and instruction, the observatory and its director, Astronomer Brendan Britton, have collaborated with physicists on exoplanet research.

== See also ==
- List of observatories
