= Clean Elections Rhode Island =

Non-profit group dedicated to passing clean elections

Clean Elections Rhode Island is a non-profit group dedicated to passing clean elections in the state of Rhode Island.

== Clean Elections ==
A clean election is a system of taxpayer-financed political campaigns. Candidates that qualify by collecting a prescribed number of signatures and $5 contributions from registered voters in their district can agree to not raise or spend any private money during the primary and general elections. Instead, a set amount of funding for the candidate's campaign is provided from the state budget. If the candidate is outspent by an opponent running a privately funded campaign, the state will provide more funding to the "clean" candidate in order to match the amount spent by the opponent, up to some multiple of the original funding.

Clean elections have been implemented in Maine and Arizona on a statewide level, as well as in Portland, Oregon on the municipal level, and elsewhere. Proponents of clean elections, including those involved in Clean Elections Rhode Island, believe that Clean Elections result in increased voter turnout, political transparency, and diversity of candidates, including fuller representation of women and minorities.

== Rhode Island Clean Elections Act ==
The current goal of Clean Elections Rhode Island is to pass the Rhode Island Clean Elections Act (RICEA), which would implement clean elections in Rhode Island, through the Rhode Island state legislature. Introduced in spring of 2004, it has been brought before the House Finance and Senate Judiciary committees every year since, but has not yet been brought to a vote. The legislative sponsors of RICEA are Senator Rhoda Perry (D-District 3, Providence) and Representative Edith Ajello (Democrat- District 3, Providence).

== Steering Committee ==
A steering committee for the Clean Elections Rhode Island campaign was formed in the fall of 2005. Its current members include:

- Common Cause Rhode Island
- Rhode Island Green Party
- The League of Women Voters of Rhode Island
- Operation Clean Government
- Rhode Island Public Interest Research Group
- American Association of University Women
- Brown University chapter of Democracy Matters
- Providence College chapter of Democracy Matters

== See also ==
- Campaign finance reform
- Clean elections
- Democracy Matters
