= Rosemary Costigan =

American academic administrator

Rosemary A. Costigan

6th President of Community College of Rhode Island
- In office June 18, 2025 – Present
- Preceded by: Meghan L. Hughes

Personal details
- Education: Community College of Rhode Island (AS); University of Rhode Island (BS), (MS), (PhD)
- Scientific career
- Fields: Healthcare, Nursing
- Institutions: Community College of Rhode Island
- Thesis: Positive Nurse-Resident Relationships a Focused Ethnography in a Nursing Home (2013)
- Doctoral advisor: Donna Schwartz-Barcott

Rosemary A. Costigan is an American academic administrator who has led the Community College of Rhode Island (CCRI) since 2025. A 1978 graduate of CCRI, Costigan worked as a nurse for 21 years in intensive care and operating room settings. She later transitioned into academia, serving as a professor at both the Community College of Rhode Island and the University of Rhode Island. She went on to become chair of the nursing department and, before assuming the presidency, served as vice president for academic affairs. Costigan is the first alumna of the college to serve as its president.
