= Providence Business News =

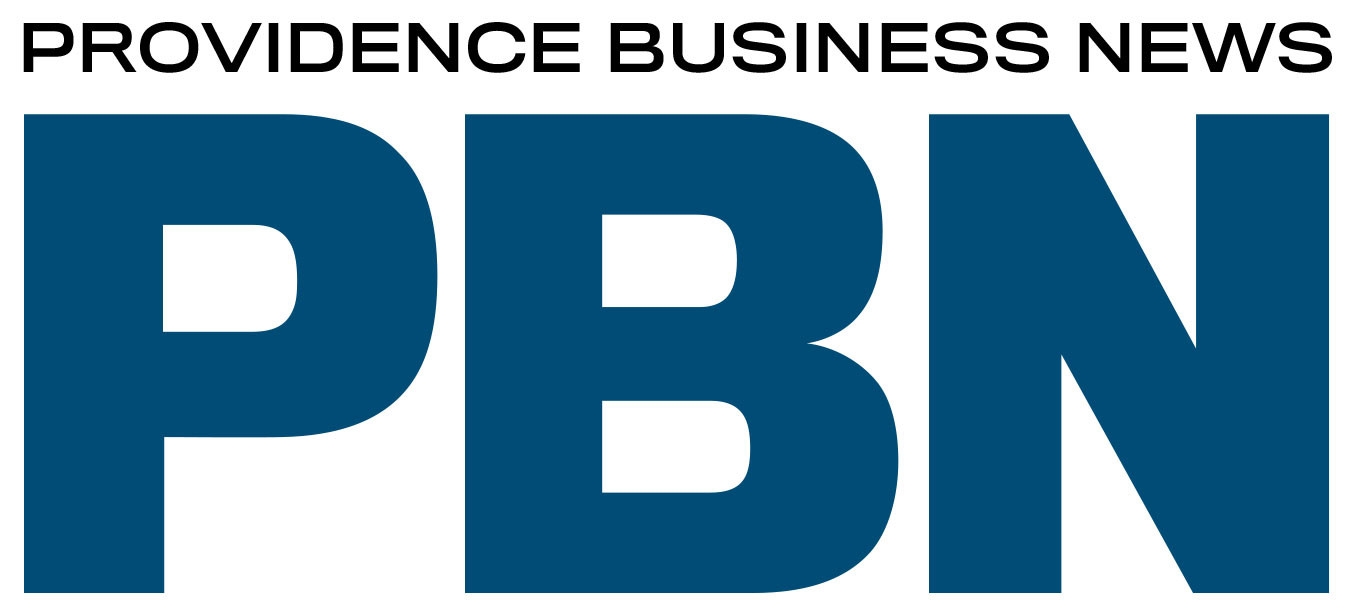
- Type: Biweekly newspaper
- Format: Tabloid
- Owner: Providence Business News Inc.
- Publisher: Roger C. Bergenheim
- Editor: Michael Mello
- Founded: May 5, 1986
- Headquarters: 400 Westminster St., Suite 600; Providence, Rhode Island 02903 United States
- Circulation: 7,062 (as of August 2013)
- Price: $5.00
- Website: PBN.com

Providence Business News, nicknamed PBN, is a bi-weekly business newspaper focusing on the economy in Rhode Island and Bristol County, Massachusetts.

== History ==
The newspaper was founded in March 1986 by Robert C. Bergenheim, who at the time was also publisher of the Boston Business Journal, and published its first issue that May. His son, Roger C. Bergenheim, has been the paper’s publisher for much of its history.

At the time it began, Providence Business News was one of three business publications in Rhode Island, the other two being Business Fortnightly of Rhode Island and Ocean State Business, both biweekly magazines. Business Fortnightly ceased publication in June 1986, and Ocean State Business closed up shop in 1990.

In 1987, Bergenheim sold his company, P&L Publications Inc., to MCP Inc. of Minneapolis, but retained part ownership in Providence Business News. Roger Bergenheim succeeded him as publisher of the Boston paper in 1988 and for a time David C. Dunbar, an advertising executive at Providence Business News, took over as that newspaper’s publisher, before Bergenheim returned to the post.

The paper was redesigned in 2004 by Creative Circle Media Consulting of Providence.

== Prizes and awards ==
PBN was named 2020 Newspaper of the Year by the New England Newspaper and Press Association at the organization’s 2020 fall conference.
