= Immigration policy of the Trump administration =

The immigration policy of the Donald Trump administration may refer to:

- Immigration policy of the first Donald Trump administration
- Immigration policy of the second Donald Trump administration
