= William Conley Jr. =

American politician

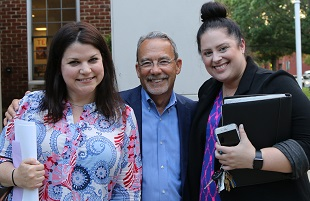
- Senator Conley with constituents at East Providence Public Library

Member of the Rhode Island Senate from the 18th district
- In office January 2013 – January 2021
- Preceded by: Frank Devall
- Succeeded by: Cynthia Mendes

Member of the East Providence City Council from the at-large district
- In office December 2010 – December 2012
- Preceded by: Joseph S. Larisa, Jr.
- Succeeded by: Tracy A. Capobianco

Acting City Manager of East Providence, Rhode Island
- In office 2003, 2004

City Solicitor of East Providence, Rhode Island
- In office c. 1990 – December 2008

Personal details
- Born: March 2, 1953 (age 73)
- Party: Democratic
- Spouse: Norma Conley
- Children: 3
- Education: Boston College; Catholic University
- Profession: Attorney-at-Law

William J. Conley Jr. (born March 2, 1953) is an American politician who was a Democratic member of the Rhode Island Senate representing District 18 from January 2013 to January 2021.

== Personal life ==
Conley is married to wife Norma Conley (Brady) and they have three children; Dylan, Colleen and Brady. They reside in the Rumford section of East Providence, Rhode Island.

== Education & Legal career ==
Conley graduated magna cum laude from Boston College and earned his JD from Catholic University. Conley owns and manages his own law firm 'The Law Office of William J. Conley, Jr' which he founded in 1982. Conley and his firm specialize in corporate, labor, administrative, municipal and educational law. Conley had served as City Solicitor in East Providence and currently serves as Town Solicitor in Johnston as well as serving as counsel to other municipalities in Rhode Island.

== East Providence City Solicitor & Acting City manager ==
In addition to his private law practice, Conley served as East Providence City Solicitor from the early 1990s until December 2008 when he was replaced by James Briden. During that time, in addition to leading the city's Law Department he also served as Assistant City Manager in 2004 and 2005. Conley also served as acting city manager in 2003 and 2004 following the end of Paul Lemont's tenure.

== East Providence City Councilor ==
Conley was elected to the East Providence City Council for the at-large seat in 2010 and served a two-year term until 2012, when he ran instead for state senate.

=== Election ===
Conley ran against incumbent at-large City Councilor Joseph Larisa Jr. whom he had worked with for over a decade when Conley served as City Solicitor. Conley beat incumbent Larisa with 62.7% of the vote.

=== Term ===
Conley's term on the city council was marred by in-fighting within the council and great financial difficulties facing the city in the wake of the great recession. On the night of his inauguration, Conley heavily objected to the election of Bruce Rogers as mayor and council president due to his past criminal issues and due to open government issues in Rogers previous term of office in the 1980s. Conley and fellow Counselor DiGoia walked out of the meeting after objecting to making appointments not named specifically on the council agenda. Conley would also call out fellow counselors for focusing too much on time clocks, employee badges and the city tow list which Conley considered relatively trivial given the city's financial condition.

In 2011, Conley proposed and championed a Deficit Elimination Committee with city and school officials to create a plan to curtail the city's growing deficit, which had started in 2003. However, after several months of work, the acting city manager at the time, Orlando Andreoni stopped working with the committee and ordered other administration officials not to attend. Only a few months later, city finances were taken over by a fiscal overseer, followed by a Budget Commission.

Conley also advocated strict enforcement actions against recycler TLA/Pond View which surrounding residents considered a noise, smell, safety and environmental issue. The recycling facility had a history of alleged violations of its zoning restrictions regarding the time of operation, type of material it recycled and quantity of material. Conley advocated getting the state Department of Environmental Management involved based on recently past state legislation limiting recycling quantities in residential neighborhoods.

== State senator ==
=== Elections ===
In 2012 When District 18 Democratic senator Frank Devall left the legislature and left the seat open, Conley was unopposed for both the September 11, 2012 Democratic primary, winning with 2,416 votes, and the November 6, 2012 General election, winning with 9,147 votes.

Preceded by Frank Devall, Jr.	Senator, Rhode Island Senate; District 18; 2013 - Present	Succeeded by Incumbent
