= J. Clement Cicilline =

American politician

Member of the Rhode Island Senate from the 50th district
- In office January 5, 1993 – January 7, 2003
- Succeeded by: District abolished

Personal details
- Born: February 7, 1940 (age 86) Providence, Rhode Island, U.S.
- Party: Democratic

J. Clement Cicilline (born February 7, 1940) is an American politician who served in the Rhode Island Senate from the 50th district from 1993 to 2003.
