= Community College of Rhode Island =

Public community college in Rhode Island, US

Coordinates: 41.868087°N 71.386899°W

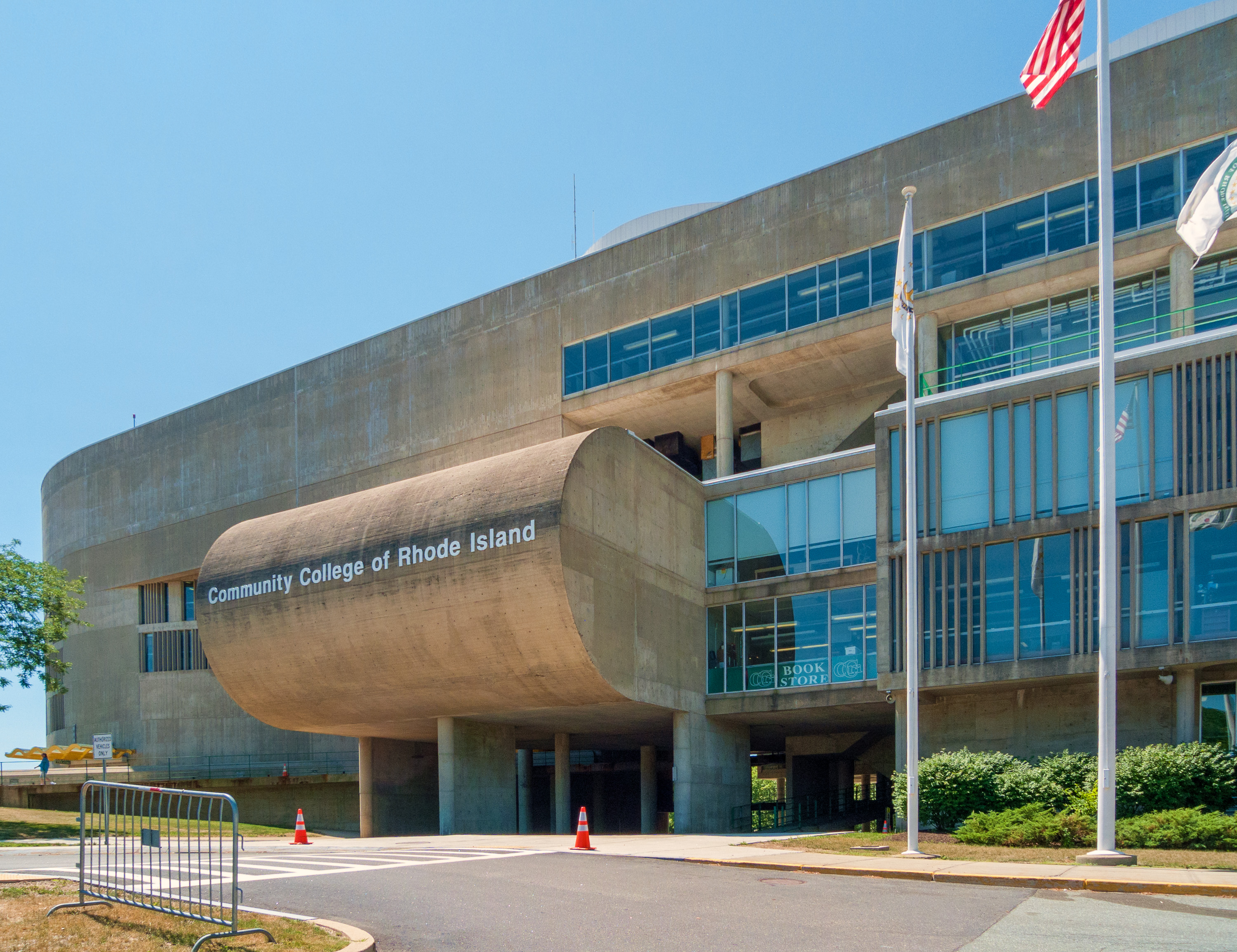
- The front side of the Knight Campus in Warwick, designed in Brutalist style.
- Former name: Rhode Island Junior College (1964–1980)
- Type: Public community college
- Established: September 24, 1964; 62 years ago
- Academic affiliations: Space-grant
- President: Rosemary Costigan
- Faculty: 300
- Students: 16,007 (2022)
- Location: Warwick (Knight Campus), Lincoln (Flanagan Campus), Providence (Liston and Downcity Campuses), Newport (Newport County Campus), Westerly (Satellite Campus), Rhode Island, U.S.
- Newspaper: The Daily Squire
- Colors: Green and Yellow
- Mascot: CCRI Knight
- Website: www.ccri.edu

The Community College of Rhode Island (CCRI) is a public community college in Warwick, Rhode Island, United States. It is the only community college in the state and the largest community college in New England. The college's primary facility is located in Warwick, with additional college buildings in Lincoln, Providence, Newport, and Westerly.

== History ==
It was founded as Rhode Island Junior College, in 1964 with 325 students studying at the Henry Barnard School in Providence, Rhode Island. In 1965, a portion of the nearby former Brown & Sharpe manufacturing facility was converted into classroom space and served as the college's primary facility until 1972. The Knight campus in Warwick, Rhode Island, built on the donated Knight Estate, opened in 1972 as the school's first permanent building and flagship campus. It was followed by three additional campus and two satellite locations.

The Margaret M. Jacoby Observatory, located on the Knight Campus grounds, was opened in 1978. The school was renamed the Community College of Rhode Island in June 1980.

=== Presidents ===
Presidents of the college have included:

	President	Life	Tenure	Summary
1.	William F. Flanagan	?–1984	1964–1979	First president. Headed the construction of the first two campuses: Knight and Flanagan.
2.	Edward J. Liston	1931–2013	1979–2000	Added the Liston campus.
3.	Thomas D. Sepe	c. 1942–	2000–2005	Record low graduation rates and terrible performance with minority students.
4.	Ray Di Pasquale	1950–2024	2006–2016	Record highest enrollment numbers and earned accreditation from the New England Association of Schools and Colleges (NEASC) until 2024.
5.	Meghan Hughes	1966–	2016–2023	First female president. Led the school to its highest graduation rate in nearly two decades.
6.	Rosemary Costigan	c. 1958–	2023–2025 (interim); 2025–present	First alumna president.

== Campuses ==
Location of Community College of Rhode Island campuses. Red dots represent satellite campuses.

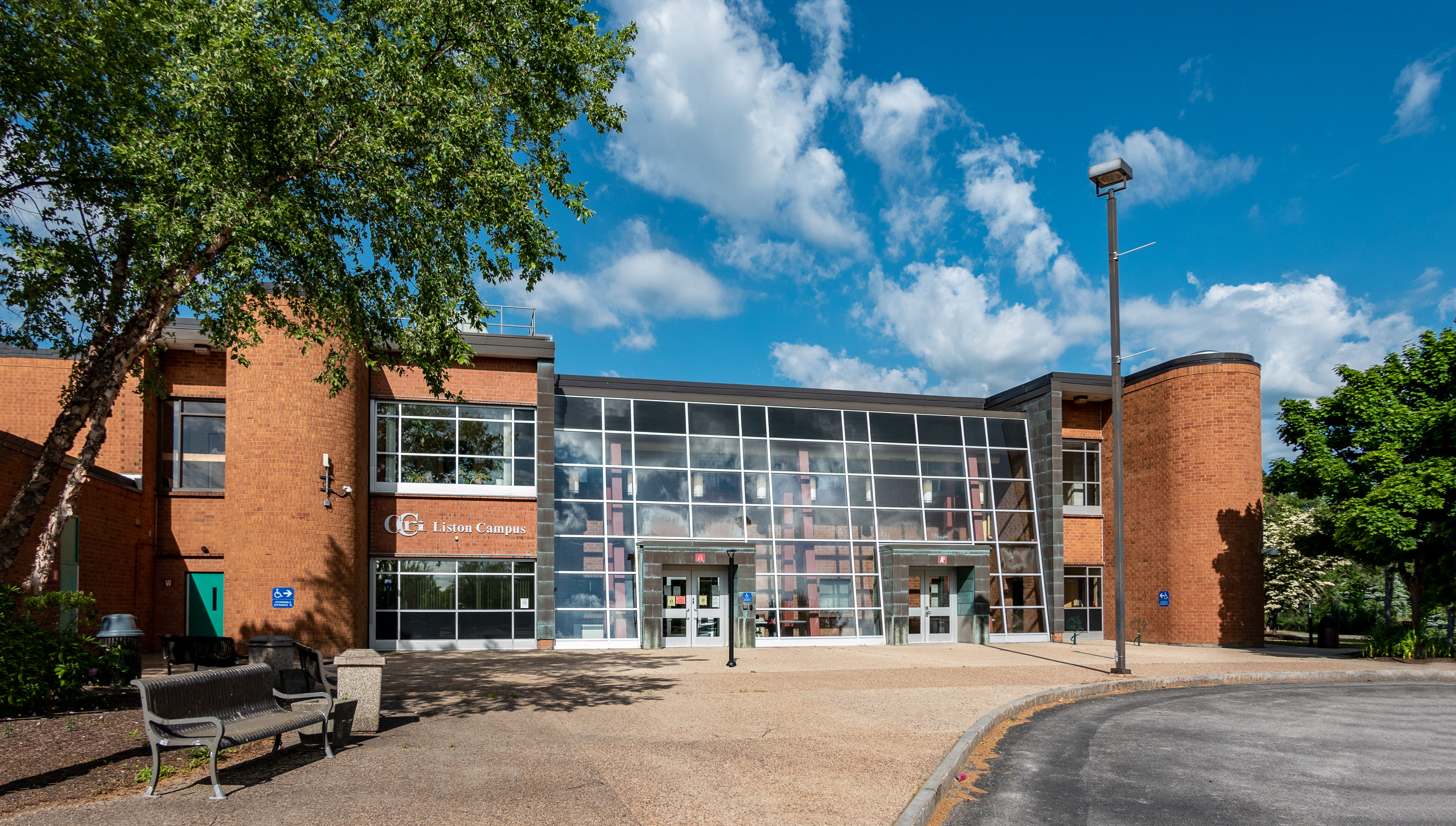
Liston campus, in South Providence.

The college's primary facility is located in Warwick, with additional college buildings throughout the state.

- Knight Campus (Warwick, opened in 1972)
- Flanagan Campus (Lincoln, opened in 1976)
- Liston Campus (Providence, opened in 1990)
- Newport County Campus (Newport, opened in 2006)
- Satellite Campus, Westerly Education Center (Westerly)
- Satellite Campus, Woonsocket Education Center (Woonsocket)

== Architecture ==
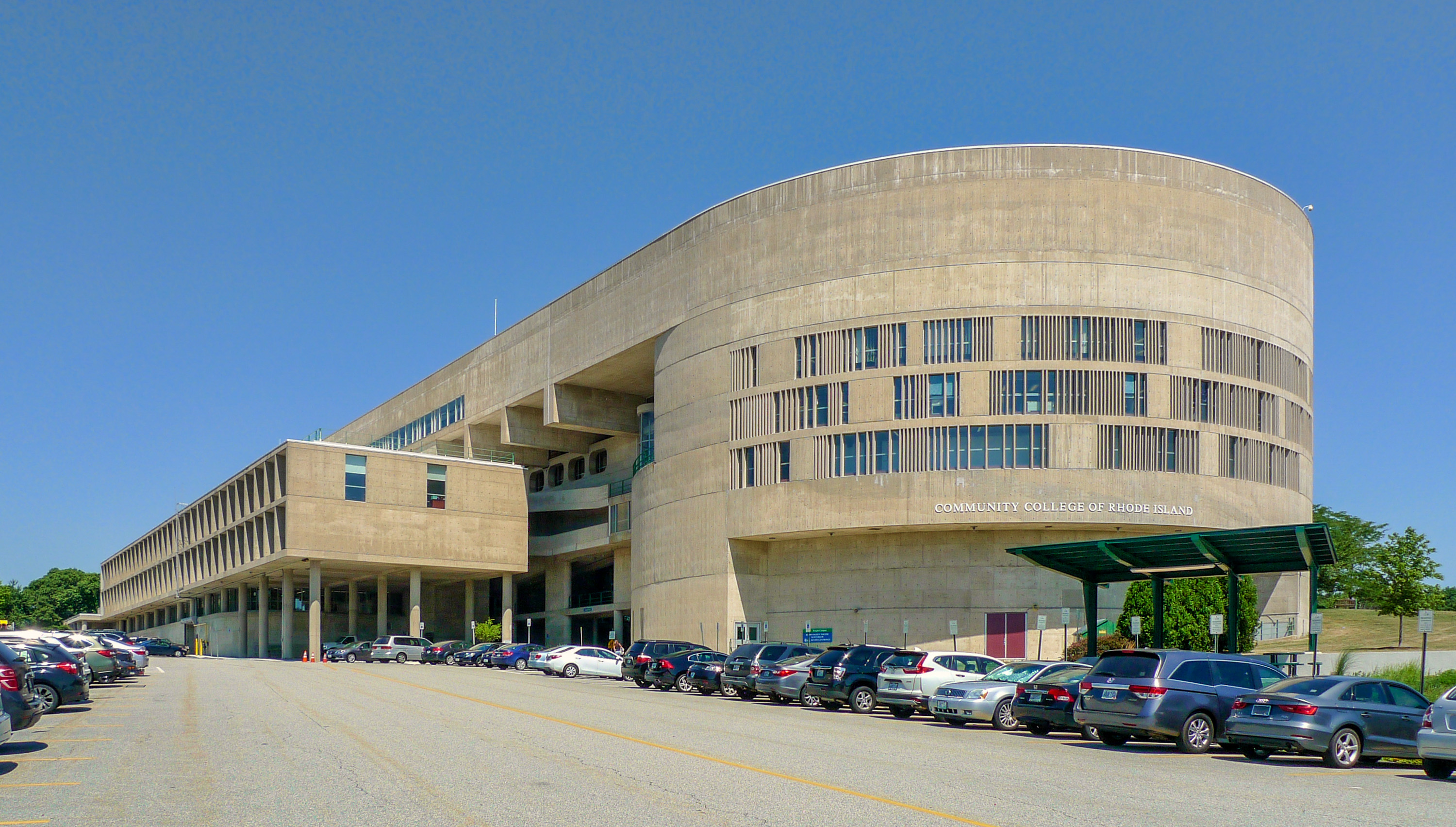
Knight campus by Perkins + Will

The college's flagship Knight building in Warwick was designed by the Chicago and New York architecture firm of Perkins & Will, in conjunction with Providence firms Harkness & Geddes and Robinson Green Beretta. The campus was designed to house all academic, social, and recreational functions in a single building. The building itself is an enormous concrete structure which terminates in a semicircle, and ranges in height from four to six stories. The design is a notable example of Brutalist architecture, and was heavily influenced by the philosophy of Le Corbusier. The building was hailed by the Rhode Island Historical Preservation Commission as "one of the most striking and innovative contemporary structures in the state" when it opened in 1972.

Over time, the Brutalist style generally lost its appeal and became seen as "drab," "hulking," and "bureaucratic," associated with large-scale mass-planning. In 2019, the Knight campus building made local news after being named "eighth ugliest college campus in the United States" by a lifestyle blog.

== Academic profile ==
The college offers the following degrees:

- Associate in Arts (A.A.)
- Associate in Science (A.S.)
- Associate in Applied Science (A.A.S.)
- Associate in Applied Science in Technical Studies (A.A.S.-T.S.)
- Associate in Fine Arts (A.F.A.)

Several one-year certificates are also awarded.

== Student life ==
The school's student newspaper is The Unfiltered Lens, which began publication in 2007. It replaced the Knightly News, which had been active in the 1980s, but had become defunct several years prior to the Lens' founding.

=== Athletics ===
The college athletics teams are nicknamed the Knights.

== Notable alumni ==
- Rhéal Cormier - professional baseball player
- Rebecca Haynes - professional basketball player
- Jvke - singer-songwriter and producer
- Ken McDonald - college basketball coach
- Cynthia Mendes - member of the Rhode Island State Senate
- Alex Owumi - professional basketball player
- Joe Polisena - member of the Rhode Island State Senate
- Tiny the Terrible - professional wrestler and politician
- Rosemary Costigan - 6th President of CCRI

== See also ==
- Margaret M. Jacoby Observatory
