= Rhode Island Political Cooperative =

Former American progressive political organization

The Rhode Island Political Cooperative was a progressive political organization founded in Rhode Island in 2019. It ran a slate of 24 candidates in the 2020 Rhode Island elections for the General Assembly, of which eight won their primaries and eight ran unopposed. The candidates campaigned on a platform of a $15 minimum wage, the Green New Deal, single-payer health care, criminal justice reform, affordable housing, quality public education, immigrants' rights, and getting money out of politics. In the 2022 elections, the cooperative ran 27 candidates for the General Assembly, of which three won their primaries and three ran unopposed.
