= Rhoda Perry =

American politician

Member of the Rhode Island Senate from the 3rd district
- In office January 1991 – December 2012

Personal details
- Born: July 16, 1943 (age 83)
- Party: Democratic
- Children: 2
- Education: University of New Hampshire (BS); Lesley University (MS)
- Profession: Retired health care administrator; part-time teacher of English as a second language

Rhoda Perry (born July 16, 1943) is an American politician who was formerly a Democratic member of the Rhode Island Senate, representing the 3rd District (Providence's East Side). Perry was the chairwoman of the Senate Committee on Health & Human Services and a member of the Senate Committee on Judiciary.

== Legislation ==
Rhoda Perry was the first legislator in Rhode Island to attempt to change the prostitution law. In 2005 Senator Perry submitted a bill to change the prostitution law, but later withdrew her support for the bill stating, "I want to get at the source, not the poor woman who was being used in this way," After withdrawing her support for a prostitution law, Perry lobbied for and passed a Human Trafficking bill in 2007 and submitted another bill in 2009 to strengthen the previously passed law.

In the documentary Happy Endings?, Senator Perry explains how she changed her mentality on prostitution laws, wanting to address the source and not the victims.

Perry was also integral in the creation of "Compassion Centers" in Rhode Island. The Medical Marijuana bill was sponsored by Senator Perry and named after her nephew Edward O Hawkins and Representative Slater who worked on the House to pass the bill.

Perry was the Senate legislative sponsor for Clean Elections Rhode Island, designed to make elections publicly funded. Introducing the act in spring of 2004, it has been brought before the House Finance and Senate Judiciary committees every year since, but has not yet been brought to a vote.
