= Ana Quezada =

American politician (born 1965)

Ana B. Quezada
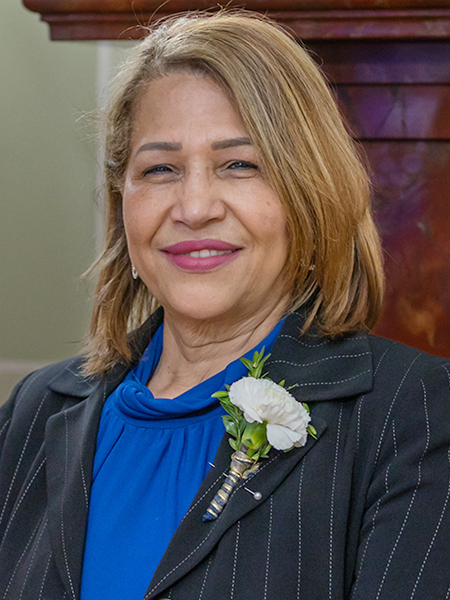

Member of the Rhode Island Senate from the 2nd district
- Incumbent
- Assumed office January 3, 2017
- Preceded by: Juan Pichardo

Personal details
- Born: April 23, 1965 (age 61) Santo Domingo, Dominican Republic
- Party: Democratic
- Spouse: Lazaro Quezada (m. 1997)
- Children: 3

Ana B. Quezada is an American politician and a Democratic member of the Rhode Island Senate representing District 2 (Providence) since January 2017. She is a code enforcement officer for the Providence Department of Inspection and Standards. Before that she was a social services coordinator at the John Hope Settlement House.

== 2018 lawsuit ==
In 2018, she sued the City of Providence, alleging that they retaliated against her for accusing a superior of alleged discrimination against a Hispanic electrical inspector.

== Political career ==
Quezada endorsed Sabina Matos in the 2022 Rhode Island lieutenant gubernatorial election.

On April 6, 2023, Quezada announced that she would be a candidate for the United States House of Representatives in a special election to succeed fellow Democrat David Cicilline.

== Personal life ==
She is married and has three children.
