= Providence City Council =

Legislature of the city of Providence, Rhode Island

Type
- Type: Unicameral
- Term limits: 3 consecutive terms

Leadership
- President: Rachel M. Miller
- President pro tempore: Juan M. Pichardo
- Majority Leader: Pedro Espinal
- Senior Deputy Majority Leader: John Goncalves
- Deputy Majority Leader: Mary Kay Harris
- Majority Whip: Miguel A. Sanchez

Structure
- Seats: 15
- Political groups: Majority (15): Democratic (15)
- Length of term: 4 years

Elections
- Voting system: Single-member districts

Meeting place
- Providence City Hall

The Providence City Council is the fifteen-member legislative body of the city of Providence, Rhode Island. The two major responsibilities of the council are enacting ordinances necessary to ensure the welfare and good order of the city and adopting the city's annual budget. Providence uses a strong-mayor form of government in which the city council acts as a check against the power of the executive branch, the mayor.

The members of the Providence City Council are elected by residents of the fifteen wards of Providence. City Council members are elected to four-year terms and are limited, by City Charter, to serving a maximum of three consecutive full terms (excluding any partial term of less than two years previously served). Council members represent the concerns, needs, and issues of their constituents, and work to improve the city's neighborhoods.

== City Council members, by ward ==
The current City Council consists of:

- Ward 1: John Goncalves
- Ward 2: Jill Davidson
- Ward 3: Sue AnderBois
- Ward 4: Justin Roias
- Ward 5: Jo-Ann Ryan
- Ward 6: Miguel Sanchez
- Ward 7: Ana Vargas
- Ward 8: James Taylor
- Ward 9: Juan Pichardo
- Ward 10: Pedro Espinal
- Ward 11: Mary Kay Harris
- Ward 12: Althea Graves
- Ward 13: Rachel Miller
- Ward 14: Shelley Peterson
- Ward 15: Oscar Vargas

All fifteen members of the council are members of the Democratic Party.

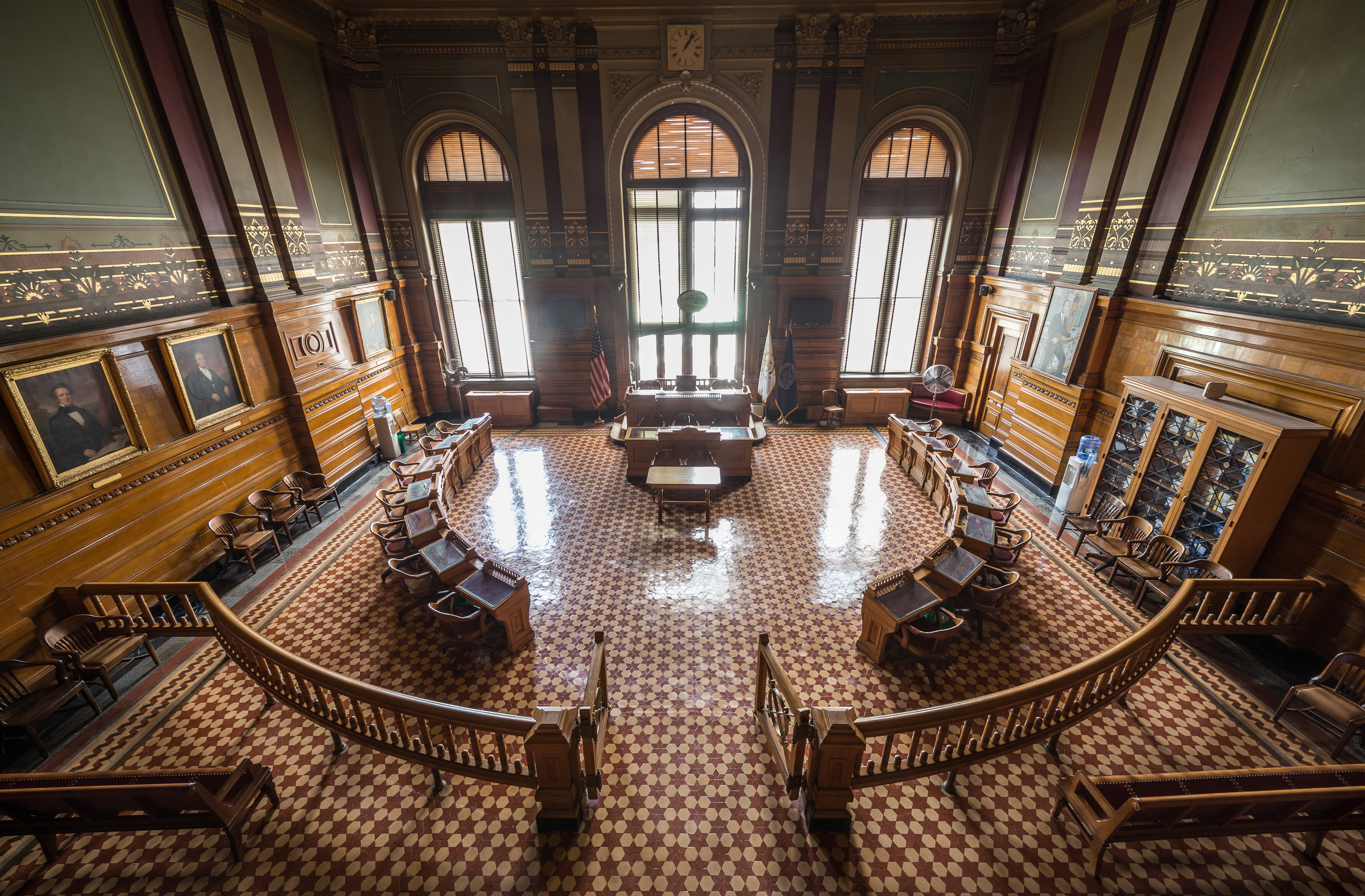
Council chambers in Providence City Hall

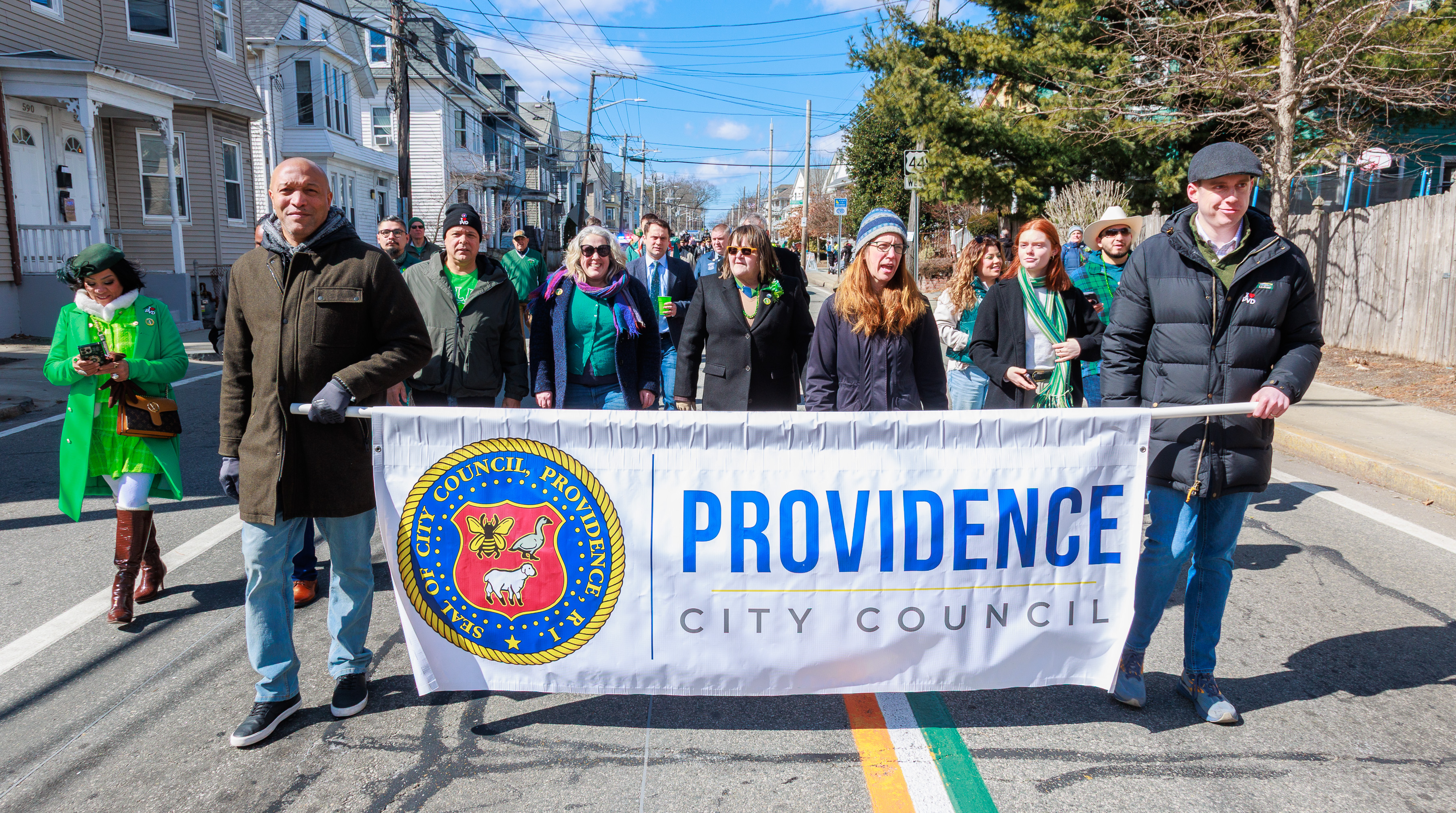
Council members in the Saint Patrick's Day Parade
