= Albert J. Lepore =

American politician (1941–2010)

Member of the Rhode Island House of Representatives from the 6th district
- In office January 3, 1969 – January 3, 1981
- Preceded by: William D'Abate
- Succeeded by: Dominick J. Ruggerio

Personal details
- Born: January 10, 1941
- Died: September 19, 2010 (aged 69)
- Party: Democratic
- Spouse: Celia Pontarelli
- Children: 3
- Education: Providence College; Suffolk University Law School

Albert Joseph Lepore Sr. (January 10, 1941 – September 19, 2010) was an American politician who served as a Democratic member of the Rhode Island House of Representatives from 1969 to 1981, representing North Providence in the 6th district.

== Early life ==
Lepore was born on January 10, 1941, and attended Pawtucket West High School, which he graduated from in 1959. Lepore attended Providence College and graduated in 1963, and received his Juris Doctor from the Suffolk University Law School in 1966.

== Political career ==
Lepore was elected as a member of the Rhode Island House of Representatives, representing the 6th district, in 1968. He took office on January 3, 1969. Lepore served for six terms, retiring in 1980 and being succeeded by future Rhode Island Senate President, Dominick J. Ruggerio.

Lepore served as a member of the House Finance Committee.

In 1992, Lepore encouraged John DeSimone to run for the 6th district House of Representatives seat, as the incumbent, Thomas Rossi, who had beaten Lepore's son for the House seat eight years prior.

== Personal life ==
Lepore was married to Celia Pontarelli in 1962. They had three children together.

Lepore was a member of the Laborers' International Union of North America, the Sons of Italy, and the Knights of Columbus.

In 1971, Lepore co-founded the Law Offices of Coia and Lepore, Ltd, with future general-president of the Laborers' International Union of North America, Arthur A. Coia. Lepore served as president of the Law Offices of Coia and Lepore for over 30 years. Lepore was a member of the Rhode Island Bar Association, the Rhode Island Trial Lawyers Association, the American Judicature Society, the American Bar Association, the U.S. District Court Bar, and the U.S. Supreme Court Bar.

In 1981, a federal grand jury in Miami indicted Lepore in a racketeering plot in the Laborers' International Union of North America. By 1982, all charges were dropped.

Lepore died in his home on September 19, 2010.
