= Marcia Ranglin-Vassell =

American politician (born 1960)

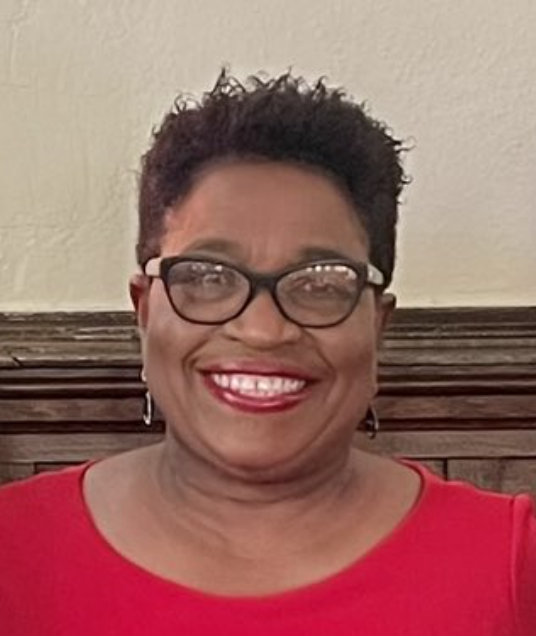

Member of the Rhode Island House of Representatives from the 5th district
- In office January 3, 2017 – January 3, 2023
- Preceded by: John DeSimone
- Succeeded by: Anthony DeSimone

Personal details
- Born: Marcia Ranglin; 1960 (age 65–66) Bull Bay, Jamaica
- Party: Democratic
- Education: Saint Joseph's Teachers' College; Rhode Island College (BA); Providence College (MEd)
- Website: Official Facebook Page

Marcia Ranglin-Vassell (born 1960) is an American educator and politician who served as a member of the Rhode Island House of Representatives representing the 5th District from 2017 to 2023. A Democrat, she is a candidate for an August 5, 2025, special election for the 4th district of the Rhode Island State Senate, which became vacant following president Dominick J. Ruggerio's death.

== Early life, education, and career ==
Ranglin-Vassell was born in Bull Bay, Jamaica. She graduated from Saint Joseph's Teachers' College, earned a Bachelor of Arts from Rhode Island College, and a Master of Arts in Special Education from Providence College.

She worked as an English language arts and special education teacher at E-Cubed Academy. As of 2025, she was working as a teacher Central High School. She is the published author of Journeys, a collection of poems about faith, life, love and determination.

== Rhode Island House of Representatives ==
=== Elections ===
Ranglin-Vassell ran to represent the 5th District in the Rhode Island House of Representatives in the Democratic primary on September 13, 2016, against the incumbent, John DeSimone, Majority Leader of the Rhode Island House of Representatives. She was supported by the Rhode Island Working Families Party as a more progressive candidate. She received the nomination with 682 votes to DeSimone's 661. She then won the general election on November 8, 2016, against Republican candidate Roland Joseph Lavallee and a write-in campaign by DeSimone with 2,460 (60.9%) votes.

Ranglin-Vassell ran against Holly Taylor Coolman in the Democratic primary on September 12, 2018. She was not endorsed by the Democratic Party, despite being the incumbent. She won the primary with 62.3% of the vote. In the November 6, 2018, General election, she won 2,572 (93.2%) votes against 188 (6.8%) write-in votes.

Ranglin-Vassell ran against Republican Ronald Iacobbo in the general election for Rhode Island House of Representatives District 5 on November 3, 2020. She won 2981 (73.8%) votes against 1027 (25.4%) votes for Iacobbo.

She decided not to run for re-election in 2022.

=== Tenure ===
Ranglin-Vassell was a member of the House Committee on Environment and Natural Resources. Her top priorities are a $15 an hour minimum wage, shifting spending from prisons to education, and decreasing gun violence. She is pro-choice.
