= Rhode Island's 17th Senate district =

American legislative district

Rhode Island's 17th State Senate district
- Boundaries since 2022
Senator
Thomas Paolino; R–Lincoln
- Registration: 28% Democratic; 17% Republican; 55% No party preference
- Demographics: 85% White; 4% Hispanic; 4% Asian; 5% Multiracial
- Population (2023): 27,959
- Registered voters (May 2025): 14,503

Rhode Island's 17th Senate district is one of 38 districts in the Rhode Island Senate. It has been represented by Republican Thomas Paolino since 2017. It is one of four districts currently represented by a Republican in the chamber.

== Geography ==
Senate District 17 contains portions of three municipalities in northern Rhode Island, those being Lincoln, North Providence, and North Smithfield.

== History ==
In 1994, voters passed a constitutional referendum shrinking the size of the Rhode Island General Assembly, with Senate membership decreasing from 50 members to 38. The changes took effect after the 2002 redistricting cycle.

Until 2002, District 17 was located entirely within the municipality of Warwick, in central Rhode Island. From 2002 to 2012, District 17 contained Lincoln, North Providence, and Pawtucket.

== List of members ==
- Thomas Paolino (Republican) 2017–present
- Edward J. O'Neill (Republican, Independent until 2016) 2009–2017 (retired)
- Joseph A. Montalbano (Democratic) 2003–2009 (defeated)
- William Walaska (Democratic) 1995–2003 (redistricted)
- Thomas A. Lynch (Democratic) until 1995

== Past election results ==
=== 2022–present ===
2024 Rhode Island Senate District 17 general election
Party	Candidate	Votes	%	±%
Republican	Thomas Paolino (inc.)	8,726	57.94%	+11.17%
Democratic	Cameron J. Deutsch	6,291	41.77%	+16.65%
Write-in		43	0.29%	0.04%
Total votes		15,060	100.00%	
Democratic hold				

2022 Rhode Island Senate District 17 general election
Party	Candidate	Votes	%	±%
Republican	Thomas Paolino (inc.)	5,314	46.80%	−12.33%
Independent	John Lyle Jr.	3,178	27.99%	New
Democratic	Cameron J. Deutsch	2,852	25.12%	−15.59%
Write-in		11	0.10%	0.04%
Total votes		11,355	100.00%	
Democratic hold				

=== 2012–2020 ===
2020 Rhode Island Senate District 17 general election
Party	Candidate	Votes	%	±%
Republican	Thomas Paolino (inc.)	9,460	59.13%	+8.63%
Democratic	John Douglas Barr II	6,512	40.71%	−8.63%
Write-in		26	0.16%	
Total votes		15,998	100.00%	
Democratic hold				

2018 Rhode Island Senate District 17 general election
Party	Candidate	Votes	%	±%
Republican	Thomas Paolino (inc.)	5,998	50.50%	−0.37%
Democratic	Dennis Lavallee	5,860	49.34%	+0.46%
Write-in		19	0.16%	−0.09%
Total votes		11,877	100.00%	
Republican hold				

In 2016, independent incumbent O'Neill switched his registration to the Republican Party and subsequently retired.

2016 Rhode Island Senate District 17 general election
Party	Candidate	Votes	%	±%
Republican	Thomas Paolino	7,224	50.87%	New
Democratic	Jina N. Petrarca-Karampetsos	6,942	48.88%	+11.11%
Write-in		35	0.25%	+0.07%
Total votes		14,201	100.00%	
Republican hold				

2014 Rhode Island Senate District 17 general election
Party	Candidate	Votes	%	±%
Independent	Edward J. O'Neill (inc.)	6,344	62.05%	+4.70%
Democratic	Keven A. McKenna	3,862	37.77%	+1.68%
Write-in		18	0.18%	−0.02%
Total votes		10,224	100.00%	
Independent hold				

2012 Rhode Island Senate District 17 general election
Party	Candidate	Votes	%	±%
Independent	Edward J. O'Neill (inc.)	7,588	57.35%	+2.87%
Democratic	John J. Cullen	4,776	36.09%	−9.43%
Independent	Derek M. Meiklejohn	842	6.36%	New
Write-in		26	0.20%	New
Total votes		13,232	100.00%	
Independent hold				

=== 2002–2010 ===
2010 Rhode Island Senate District 17 general election
Party	Candidate	Votes	%	±%
Independent	Edward J. O'Neill (inc.)	5,316	54.48%	+1.37%
Democratic	Linda Butera Noble	4,441	45.52%	−1.37%
Total votes		9,757	100.00%	
Independent hold				

2008 Rhode Island Senate District 17 general election
Party	Candidate	Votes	%	±%
Independent	Edward J. O'Neill	6,773	53.11%	New
Democratic	Joseph A. Montalbano (inc.)	5,980	46.89%	−19.15%
Total votes		12,753	100.00%	
Independent gain from Democratic				

2008 Rhode Island Senate District 17 general election
Party	Candidate	Votes	%	±%
Democratic	Joseph A. Montalbano (inc.)	7,150	66.04%	−0.41%
Independent	James B. Spooner	3,676	33.96%	New
Total votes		10,826	100.00%	
Democratic hold				

2004 Rhode Island Senate District 17 general election
Party	Candidate	Votes	%	±%
Democratic	Joseph A. Montalbano (inc.)	8,017	66.45%	−33.55%
Republican	Arthur H. Fletcher	4,033	33.43%	New
Write-in		14	0.12	New
Total votes		12,064	100.00%	
Democratic hold				

In 2002, incumbent senator William Walaska was redistricted to Senate District 30. Joseph A. Montalbano, who represented District 37 until 2002, was elected from District 17.

2020 Rhode Island Senate District 17 general election
Party	Candidate	Votes	%	±%
Democratic	Joseph A. Montalbano (inc.)	6,030	100.00%	
Total votes		6,030	100.00%	
Democratic hold				

=== Until 2000 ===
2000 Rhode Island Senate District 17 general election
Party	Candidate	Votes	%	±%
Democratic	William Walaska (inc.)	6,373	100.00%	+26.63%
Total votes		6,373	100.00%	
Democratic hold				

1998 Rhode Island Senate District 17 general election
Party	Candidate	Votes	%	±%
Democratic	William Walaska (inc.)	4,941	73.34%	+2.13%
Independent	Raymond T. McKay	1,788	26.54%	−4.55%
Write-in		8	0.12%	New
Total votes		6,737	100.00%	
Democratic hold				

1996 Rhode Island Senate District 17 general election
Party	Candidate	Votes	%	±%
Democratic	William Walaska (inc.)	5,353	68.91%	+11.20%
Republican	Steven Archer	2,415	31.09%	−11.20%
Total votes		7,768	100.00%	
Democratic hold				

1994 Rhode Island Senate District 17 general election
Party	Candidate	Votes	%	±%
Democratic	William Walaska	4,424	57.71%	+11.29%
Republican	Steven Archer	3,242	42.29%	+9.48%
Total votes		7,666	100.00%	
Democratic hold				

1992 Rhode Island Senate District 17 general election
Party	Candidate	Votes	%	±%
Democratic	Thomas A. Lynch (inc.)	4,379	46.42%	−53.59%
Republican	Jude Plante	3,095	32.81%	New
Independent	John T. Kirby	1,960	20.78%	New
Total votes		9,434	100.00%	
Democratic hold				

1990 Rhode Island Senate District 17 general election
Party	Candidate	Votes	%	±%
Democratic	Thomas A. Lynch	5,420	100.00%	
Total votes		5,420	100.00%	

== See also ==
- Rhode Island's 1st Senate district
- Rhode Island's 2nd Senate district
