= 2025 Rhode Island Senate District 4 special election =

- August 5, 2025

Rhode Island Senate District 4
Candidate	Stefano Famiglietti	Alex Asermely
Party	Democratic	Republican
Popular vote	1,690	332
Percentage	83.6%	16.4%
Senator before election
Dominick J. Ruggerio
Democratic
Elected Senator
Stefano Famiglietti
Democratic

A special election in the U.S. State of Rhode Island was held August 5, 2025, to elect a new member for District 4 in the Rhode Island Senate, representing part of North Providence. The election filled the vacancy caused by the death of longtime Democratic state senator and president Dominick J. Ruggerio, who died on April 21, 2025. Primary elections were held on July 8. The Democratic nominee, North Providence Councilmember Stefano Famiglietti, defeated his Republican opponent, attorney Alex Asermely, in an overwhelming landslide of more than two-thirds of the vote.

== Procedure and background ==
Voter registration in Senate District 4 as of April 2025 per the office of the Secretary of State:
1. Democratic (45.5%)
2. Republican (11.2%)
3. Unaffiliated (43.3%)

Under state law, vacancies in the Rhode Island Legislature are filled by special election. The Rhode Island Secretary of State is required to schedule an election between 70 and 90 days of the initial vacancy. If the vacancy took place after the first Monday of February during a general election year, the special election must be held in tandem with the general election. The elected legislator will serve the remainder of the unexpired term.

The election was made necessary by the death of Senate President Dominick J. Ruggerio after his death from cancer on the morning of April 21, 2025. He had represented the 4th district since 2005, but served in the legislature continuously since 1981. He served as majority leader from 2009 to 2017, and served as President of the Rhode Island Senate from 2017 until his death. A new leader for the Senate presidency will also need to be held. Before the vacancy, Democrats dominated the legislature 34 to 4 Republicans, so the special election will not significantly affect the balance of power in the chamber.

As of April 2025, registered voters affiliated with the Democratic Party heavily outnumber registered Republicans. Of the 21,295 registered voters, 9,679 or 45.5% are registered Democrats, 2,390 or 11.2% are registered Republicans, and 9,226 or 43.3% have no partisan affiliation.

=== Previous results (2004–present) ===
Year	Democrats			Opponents		
2024	Dominick J. Ruggerio (i)	10,736	94.87%	Write-in	580	5.13%
2022	Dominick J. Ruggerio (i)	6,892	93.00%	Write-in	519	7.00%
2020	Dominick J. Ruggerio (i)	9,590	94.01%	Write-in	611	5.99%
2018	Dominick J. Ruggerio (i)	7,293	95.92%	Write-in	310	4.08%
2016	Dominick J. Ruggerio (i)	8,485	95.78%	Write-in	374	4.22%
2014	Dominick J. Ruggerio (i)	6,443	96.48%	Write-in	235	3.52%
2012	Dominick J. Ruggerio (i)	7,039	66.32%	John D. Ricottilli (Ind.)	2,924	27.55%
2012				Michael J. Rollins (Lbt.)	614	5.79%
2012				Write-in	36	0.34%
2010	Dominick J. Ruggerio (i)	5,360	65.99%	Thomas J. Rossi (Ind.)	2,762	34.01%
2008	Dominick J. Ruggerio (i)	7,759	70.05%	Christine C. Spaziano (Rep.)	3,318	29.95%
2006	Dominick J. Ruggerio (i)	7,417	78.90%	Gary G. Jerejian (Rep.)	1,983	21.10%
2004	Dominick J. Ruggerio	8,022	78.54%	Eze Aso (Rep.)	2,192	21.46%

== Democratic primary ==
=== Candidates ===
==== Nominee ====
- Stefano Famiglietti, North Providence Councilmember from the 2nd district

==== Eliminated in primary ====
- Lenny Cioe, nurse and candidate for this seat in 2020, 2022, and 2024
- Marcia Ranglin-Vassell, former state representative from the 5th district (2017-2023)
- Manny Taveras, account executive and brother of former Mayor of Providence Angel Taveras

=== Endorsements ===
Stefano Famiglietti

State legislators

- Frank Ciccone, Majority Leader of the Rhode Island Senate (2025–present) from the 7th district (2005–present)

Labor unions

- Rhode Island AFL-CIO

=== Results ===
Democratic primary results
Party	Candidate	Votes	%
Democratic	Stefano Famiglietti	1,664	68.06
Democratic	Marcia Ranglin-Vassell	382	15.62
Democratic	Lenny Cioe	281	11.49
Democratic	Manny Taveras	118	4.83
Total votes		2,445	100.00

Results by town
Town	Cioe		Famiglietti		Ranglin-Vassell		Taveras		Total
Providence	27	11.25%	67	27.92%	136	56.67%	10	4.17%	240
North Providence	254	11.52%	1,597	72.43%	246	11.16%	108	4.90%	2,205

== Republican primary ==
=== Candidates ===
==== Nominee ====
- Alex Asermely, attorney

== Independents ==
=== Candidates ===
==== Withdrawn ====
- Stephen Tocco, former Smithfield Councilmember, Democratic candidate for this district in 2022, and perennial candidate

== General election ==
=== Results ===
General election results
Party	Candidate	Votes	%
Democratic	Stefano Famiglietti	1,706	83.67%
Republican	Alex Asermely	333	16.33%
Total votes		2,039	100.00%

Results by town
Town	Famiglietti		Asermely		Total
Providence	88	89.80%	10	10.20%	98
North Providence	1,618	83.36%	323	16.64%	1,941

== See also ==
- 2025 United States state legislative elections
