= Adam Tyler =

Adam Tyler may refer to:

- Adam Tyler, musician in Electrovamp
- Adam Tyler, character in They Walk Among Us
- Adam Tyler (screenwriter) on Haywire (TV series)
