= Senator O'Neil =

Senator O'Neil or O'Neill may refer to:

- Jerry O'Neil (politician) (born 1943), Montana State Senate
- William T. O'Neil (1850–1909), New York State Senate
- William O'Neil (Wisconsin politician) (1848–1917), Wisconsin State Senate
- Bill O'Neill (New Mexico politician), New Mexico State Senate
- Charles O'Neill (Pennsylvania politician) (1821–1893), Pennsylvania State Senate
- Edward J. O'Neill (Rhode Island politician), Rhode Island State Senate
- Edward O'Neill (Wisconsin politician) (1820–1890), Wisconsin State Senate
- Héctor O'Neill (born 1945), former member of the Senate of Puerto Rico
- Isabelle Ahearn O'Neill (1880–1975), Rhode Island State Senate
- James O'Neill (Washington politician) (1824–1913), Washington State Senate
- John O'Neill (congressman) (1822–1905), Ohio State Senate
- Lottie Holman O'Neill (1878–1967), Illinois State Senate
- Deborah O'Neill (born 1961), member of the Australian Senate
