= Raymond Hull (politician) =

American politician (born 1963)

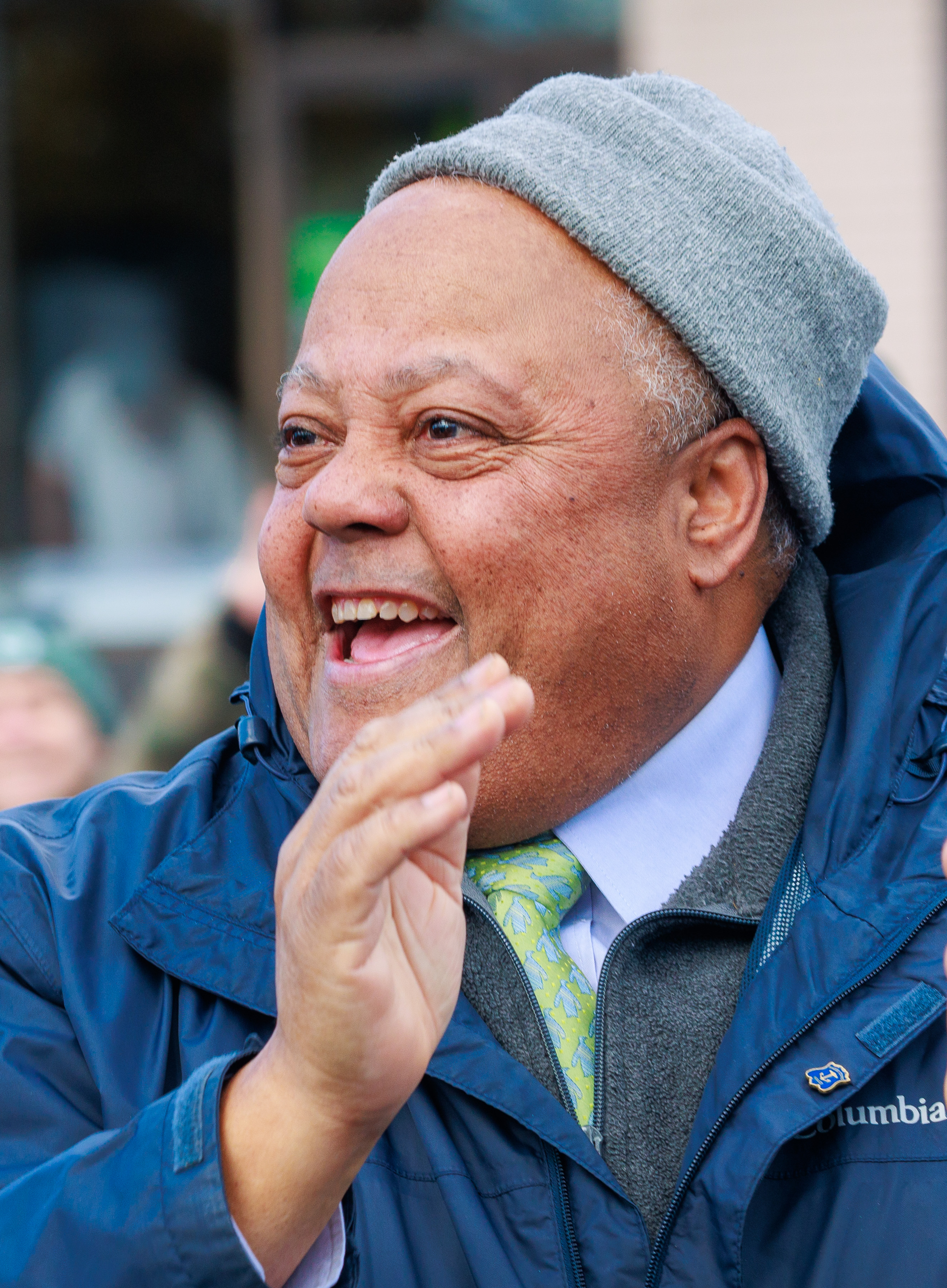
- Hull in 2025

Member of the Rhode Island House of Representatives from the 6th district
- Incumbent
- Assumed office January 2011
- Preceded by: Peter N. Wasylyk

Personal details
- Born: September 18, 1963 (age 63)
- Party: Democratic
- Education: University of Rhode Island; Roger Williams University; Anna Maria College
- Website: rayhull.com

Raymond A. Hull (born September 18, 1963) is an American politician and a Democratic member of the Rhode Island House of Representatives representing District 6 since January 2011. During the legislative session beginning in 2015, Hull was one of three African-American members of the Rhode Island House of Representatives.

== Education ==
Hull graduated from La Salle Academy in 1981; attended the University of Rhode Island, earned his BA in criminal justice from Roger Williams University, and earned his MA in administration of justice from Anna Maria College.

== 2020 Legislation ==
In February 2020, Hull introduced a bill to create a DCYF legislative oversight commission. He was also named to lead the coronavirus vaccine distribution task force.

== Elections ==
- 2012 In a rematch of their 2010 contest, Hull was challenged by former Representative Peter N. Wasylyk in the September 11, 2012 Democratic Primary, winning with 1,160 votes (74.4%) and was unopposed for the November 6, 2012 General election, winning with 4,182 votes.
- 2010 Hull challenged District 6 incumbent Representative Wasylyk in the September 23, 2010 Democratic Primary, winning with 1,396 votes (59.5%) and was unopposed for the November 2, 2010 General election, winning with 2,195 votes.
