= Joseph A. Montalbano =

American politician

Associate Justice of the Rhode Island Superior Court
- Incumbent
- Assumed office June 1, 2013
- Appointed by: Lincoln Chafee
- Preceded by: Francis Darigan Jr.

1st President of the Rhode Island Senate
- In office January 7, 2003 – January 3, 2009
- Preceded by: Office established
- Succeeded by: M. Teresa Paiva-Weed

Member of the Rhode Island Senate from the 17th District
- In office January 3, 2003 – January 3, 2009
- Preceded by: William Walaska
- Succeeded by: Edward O'Neill

Member of the Rhode Island Senate from the 37th District
- In office January 3, 1989 – January 3, 2003
- Succeeded by: V. Susan Sosnowski

Personal details
- Born: November 23, 1954 (age 71)
- Party: Democratic

Joseph A. Montalbano (born November 23, 1954) is an American politician and judge. He is an Associate Justice on the Rhode Island Superior Court.

== Political career ==
Montalbano served as Democratic member of the Rhode Island Senate, representing the 37th District from 1988 to 2002, when the Senate was downsized from 50 to 38 members in 2002. Montalbano then represented the 17th district until he was he was defeated in 2008 by Independent Edward O'Neill. He served as the President of the Senate from 2003 to 2009, and was Majority Leader from 2002 through 2003. In 2013, Governor Lincoln Chafee nominated Montalbano to serve as Associate Justice on the Rhode Island Superior Court in the seat vacated by Justice Francis Darigan Jr. Montalbano has served in the position since June 2013. Montalbano is the first former state senator to become a Superior Court judge since 1994.

== Controversies ==
In 2007, Montalbano was fined $12,000 by the Rhode Island Ethics Commission for failing to disclose a potential conflict of interest. While acting as a private attorney for the town of West Warwick, Montalbano, in his role as a state senator, voted on issues pertaining to the development of a Narraganset-owned casino within the town. Montalbano dismissed the wrongdoing as inadvertent.

== Personal life ==
Montalbano attended St. John's University in New York and received his bachelor's degree from the University of Pennsylvania. He has taught constitutional and criminal law at the Community College of Rhode Island.
