= Nicholas O'Neill (writer) =

American writer

- Born: Nicholas Philip O'Neill; January 28, 1985; Warwick, Rhode Island, U.S.
- Died: February 20, 2003 (aged 18); West Warwick, Rhode Island, U.S.
- Other names: Nicholas P. O'Neill; Nicky O'Neill; Nick O'Neill; Nicky O.
- Occupations: Writer; musician; actor
- Years active: 1999–2003
- Known for: Youngest person to die in The Station nightclub fire
- Parents: Dave Kane (father); Joanne O'Neill (mother)

Nicholas Philip O'Neill (January 28, 1985 – February 20, 2003) was the youngest of the 100 victims of The Station nightclub fire, which occurred in West Warwick, Rhode Island. He had turned 18 in January of that year. His life and work as a writer, actor and musician has been memorialized by the documentary 41 and in the book 41 Signs of Hope. 41 is based on the thesis that Nicholas may have somehow foreseen his own death, as suggested by his various documented writings. The film (including the extra material featured on the DVD) includes interviews with, among others, Land, radio host Dave Kane (Nicholas' father), writer Ann Hood, medium Robert Brown, and University of Arizona afterlife researcher Gary Schwartz. O'Neill also authored a play, They Walk Among Us, which was produced in various cities after his death, and was adapted into a screenplay by novelist Jon Land.

== Life and career ==
Nicholas Philip O'Neill was born on January 28, 1985, the only son of Joanne (née Romanelli) O'Neill and Dave Kane. He lived for most of his life in Cranston, Rhode Island with his mother and his older half-brothers Christian and William from his mother's first marriage. O'Neill began acting at a young age in church, school and community theater productions, playing such roles as Linus in You're a Good Man, Charlie Brown and Conrad Birdie in Bye Bye Birdie. By the age of 14, he was performing improv comedy and by the age of 17, he had taught himself to play guitar and performed as front man with the rock band Shryne, using the stage name Nicky O. Meanwhile, he began to struggle with school, eventually losing interest in it entirely and dropping out. During his last years, he was focused on acting with the Providence company All Children's Theater, and writing and performing music. He was involved in a serious, long-term relationship with his girlfriend, Gabby Sherba.

O'Neill's family alleges that toward the end of his life, he began having mystical experiences, which they claim influenced much of his writing, including his songwriting, journals, and his play, They Walk Among Us, which features a character that O'Neill seemed to have based on himself. The character is a teenager who has died and become a guardian angel who watches over other young people.

=== Death ===
O'Neill was at the Station nightclub for the concert by the band Great White on February 20, 2003, with his bandmate from Shryne, Jon Brennan, and another friend, Albert Dibonaventura (1984–2003). Of the three, only Brennan made it out of the club alive. Shryne was scheduled to perform at the Station the following night, and O'Neill had reportedly befriended Great White lead singer Jack Russell in the days before the fire.

In 41, Nicholas O'Neill's family and friends emphasize his sense of humor, his natural intelligence and wisdom, and his compassion. They note that, despite the brevity of his life, he had a positive influence on many people, as evidenced by the attendance of over a thousand people at his memorial service.

== Works and legacy ==
O'Neill left behind voluminous journals, poems and songs, many of which are considered by his family to contain prophetic messages indicating that he knew he would die at an early age. Eight songs that he wrote or co-wrote appear on his band Shryne's debut album, Day Has Turned to Evening.

His play, They Walk Among Us, tells the story of Adam Tyler, a young man struggling to come to terms with his homosexuality, and, simultaneously, that of Levi, Grace and Cyrus, the three guardian angels charged with helping Adam. The angels ultimately appear before Adam, imparting upon him a message of divine unconditional love, telling him "on the other side, everything […] will be just fine."

Following O'Neill's passing, a number of events were held in his honor. The first was a memorial service at his church parish, St. Jude's in Lincoln, RI. The event drew approximately 1100 attendees. Other memorial services were held by theater companies that O'Neill had performed with, and numerous feature articles were published by the local press centering on his life and works.

O'Neill's friends and family first staged They Walk Among Us as a staged reading in June 2003. The following February, on the one year anniversary of the tragedy, a large memorial theater event was produced by the Encore Repertory Company, a theater troupe to which O'Neill had performed. The event, called A Night of Angels, was directed by O'Neill's brother Christian and featured musical tributes as well as a fully staged production of They Walk Among Us. O'Neill made this event the basis of an Emerson College master's thesis, The Song of Nick, and later created a film version of They Walk Among Us. He also was the assistant director of the award-winning New York production of the play in 2008 (produced by My Own Delirium Productions) and co-directed, with Christian de Rezendes, the 2007 documentary 41. The film, which is named after a number of spiritual significance in O'Neill's life was shown at film festivals across the United States to generally positive reviews. Dave Kane's book, 41 Signs of Hope, which deals with similar subject matter, is published by New River Press.

Dave Kane and Joanne O'Neill were the subject of much of the press surrounding the trial of Daniel Biechele, who ignited the pyrotechnics that caused the Station fire, partly because of Kane's local celebrity and his frequent attacks on Rhode Island Attorney General Patrick Lynch. Kane read aloud a letter in which he told Biechele that he and Joanne had forgiven him. Their belief in their son's ongoing presence in their lives was also covered by a Boston Globe feature article in 2006.

== Charities ==
Several charitable funds and entire organizations have been formed in O'Neill's name, including The Nicky O Foundation, the Encore Rep Nick O'Neill Scholarship, and the ACT Nicholas O'Neill Memorial Scholarship.
