= Valarie Lawson =

American politician and a Democratic member of the Rhode Island Senate

Val Lawson
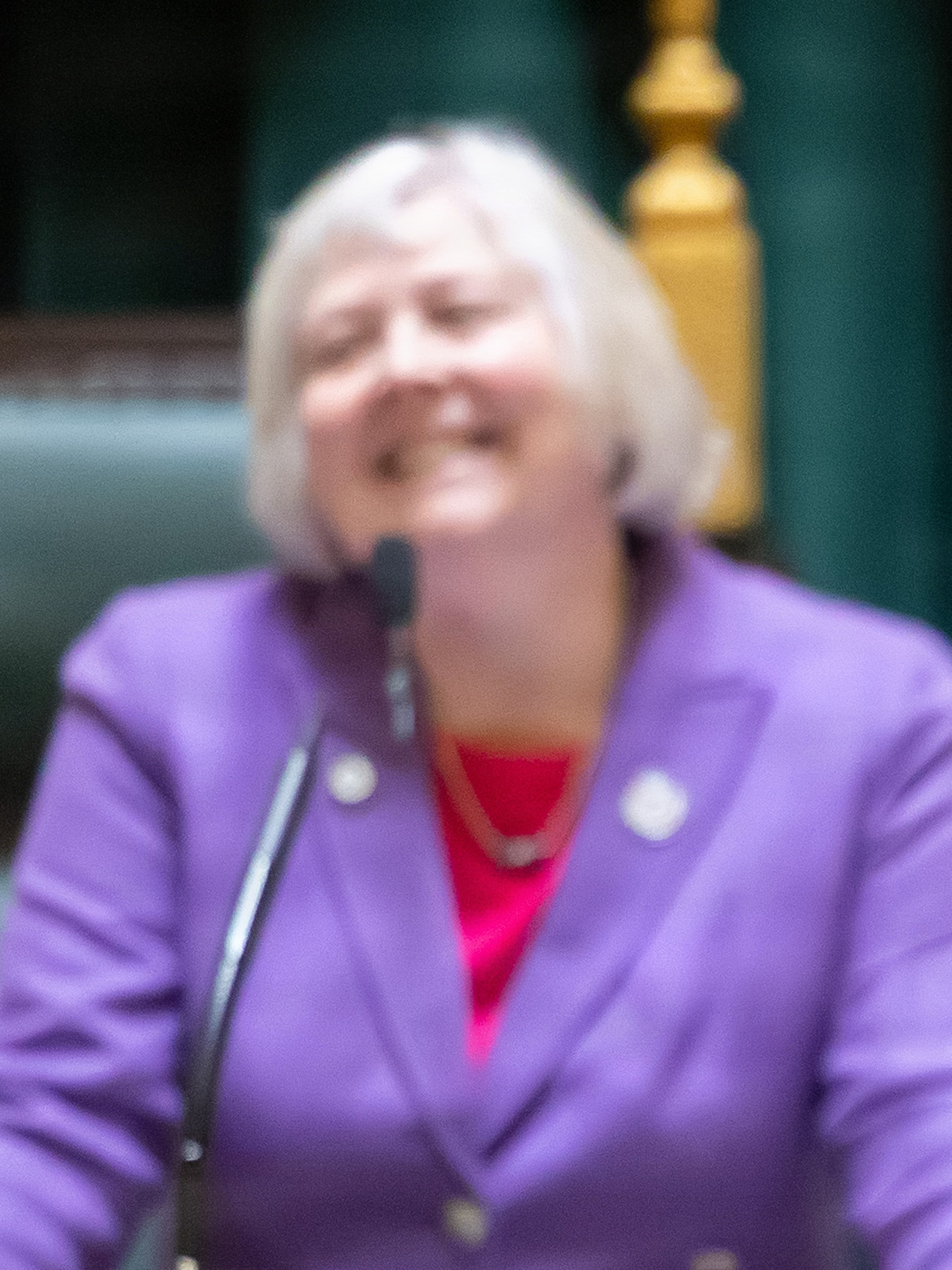

4th President of the Rhode Island Senate
- Incumbent
- Assumed office April 29, 2025
- Preceded by: Dominick J. Ruggerio

Majority Leader of the Rhode Island Senate
- In office January 7, 2025 – April 29, 2025
- Preceded by: Ryan W. Pearson
- Succeeded by: Frank Ciccone

Member of the Rhode Island Senate from the 14th district
- Incumbent
- Assumed office January 2019
- Preceded by: Daniel Da Ponte

Personal details
- Born: August 14, 1966 (age 59) East Providence, Rhode Island, U.S.
- Party: Democratic
- Education: Rhode Island College (BA, MA)
- Website: Campaign website

Valarie Lawson (born August 14, 1966) is an American politician and a Democratic member of the Rhode Island Senate, representing District 14 since January 2019.

Lawson was an educator at East Providence High School where she taught U.S History and civics. She was also the Vice-President of the National Education Association of Rhode Island. She became the president of this teachers union in 2023.

Lawson was elected as majority leader of the Rhode Island Senate in November 2024 and as president in April 2025 following the death of Dominick J. Ruggerio

Rhode Island Senate
Preceded by Ryan W. Pearson	Majority Leader of the Rhode Island Senate; 2025	Succeeded by Frank Ciccone
Political offices
Preceded by Dominick J. Ruggerio	President of the Rhode Island Senate; 2025–present	Incumbent
