= Francis Darigan Jr. =

Retired associate justice of the Rhode Island Superior Court"

Member of the Providence City Council representing the Ninth Ward
- In office 1971–1975

Associate Judge of the Rhode Island District Court
- In office 1984–1991
- Appointed by: John Joseph Garrahy

Justice on the Rhode Island Superior Court
- In office 1991–2012
- Appointed by: Bruce Sundlun
- Succeeded by: Joseph A. Montalbano

Personal details
- Born: September 21, 1942 (age 83)

Francis J. Darigan Jr. is a retired Rhode Island politician who is most notable as Associate Justice of the Rhode Island Superior Court.

== Personal life ==
Darigan was born in 1942 to an Irish-Catholic family in South Providence, Rhode Island. He graduated from La Salle Academy in 1960 and Providence College in 1964 with a degree in political science. From 1965 to 1967, Darigan served as a member of the US Armed Forces at the Defense Intelligence Agency in Washington DC. Following his discharge from active duty in 1967, Darigan served as a reserve officer in the US Army's 76th division, retiring from military service in 1975 with the rank of captain.

In 1967, Darigan married Alexandra Hope Kingscote.

Darigan received his JD from Suffolk University School of Law in 1971 and his master's degree in public administration from the University of Rhode Island in 1974.

Francis and Alexandra Darigan have four adult children.

== Public office ==
From 1971 to 1975, Darigan served as a council member on the Providence City Council, representing the Ninth Ward (including Elmwood, South Providence, and Washington Park).

Following his membership on the city council, Darigan acted as legal counsel to the Rhode Island Department of Transportation, Governor's Office on Energy, and the Public Utilities Commission.

On January 26, 1984, then-Governor J. Joseph Garrahy appointed Darigan to the Rhode Island District Court.

On June 28, 1991, Darigan was appointed associate justice of the Superior Court of Rhode Island by then-governor Bruce Sundlun. Darigan presided over a number of high-profile cases, including the trials of Daniel Michael Biechele of the Station Nightclub Fire and former governor Edwin DiPrete. Darigan served on the court for seven years before his retirement on February 29, 2012.
