= Peter N. Wasylyk =

American attorney (born 1957)

Member of the Rhode Island House of Representatives from the 6th district
- In office January 3, 2003 – January 3, 2011
- Preceded by: John J. DeSimone
- Succeeded by: Raymond Hull

Member of the Rhode Island House of Representatives from the 10th district
- In office January 3, 1985 – January 3, 2003
- Preceded by: Keven McKenna
- Succeeded by: Thomas C. Slater

Personal details
- Born: January 15, 1957 (age 69)
- Party: Democratic
- Spouse: Sharon Wasylyk
- Children: 3
- Education: Providence College, Suffolk Law School
- Profession: Attorney

Peter N. Wasylyk (born 1957) is an American attorney who is also a Democratic party member of the Rhode Island House of Representatives, representing the 6th District from 2003 until 2011 after previously serving in the 10th district from 1985 until 2003. During the 2009-2010 sessions, he served on the House Committee on Health, Education and Welfare, and served as Deputy Majority Leader. Wasylyk was defeated in the 14 September 2010 Democratic Primary to Raymond A. Hull, who went on to win the general election on 2 November 2010.
