= Dave Kane =

American comedian and talk show host (born 1948)

- Kane in 2012
- Born: Dave Kane; January 26, 1948 (age 78); Pawtucket, Rhode Island, U.S.
- Occupations: Radio personality, comedian, author
- Spouse: Joanne O'Neill
- Children: Nicholas O’Neill; David Kane

Dave Kane (born January 26, 1948) is an American radio talk show host, comedian, performance artist, and author. Kane was born in Pawtucket, Rhode Island and currently still makes his home in the Ocean State.

Nicknamed "The Pitbull of comedy" in the 1980s during his time as a stand-up comedian, Kane is known for his passionate, sometimes confrontational style of talk radio, urging people to stand up for what they believe in and to take action in the face of injustice. One of Kane's oft-spoken phrases is the well known quote, often attributed to Irish philosopher Edmund Burke, "All that is necessary for evil to exist is for good people to do nothing."

In addition to his strong viewpoints about current local and national issues, his radio show, dubbed "Kane and Company", also features Kane's self-deprecating style of humor liberally peppered throughout. Conflict between Kane and his callers is commonplace, with some of the more vociferous people attaining the level of "Prisoner." This is a title Kane reserves for the most antagonistic callers who consistently claim to hate his show, but who feel compelled to keep listening and/or calling back to argue.

== Radio career ==
Dave Kane has been involved in the field of radio for over 50 years, beginning in 1962, when he was 14 years old. His first radio-related job was at Pawtucket's WPAW where he acted as an intern for radio legend Chuck Stevens (an inductee into the Rhode Island Radio Hall of Fame). Kane's first paying radio job at the now-defunct WKFD in North Kingstown lasted for just one day.

His involvement in talk radio began in the early 1970s when he worked as a producer for WJAR radio and filled in for the other hosts. From that point forward, Kane has carved a successful niche in Rhode Island talk radio, spending time at various stations throughout the state, including WPRO and WHJJ, two of the largest and most powerful talk stations in the state. In 2005, Kane joined WNRI in Woonsocket, Rhode Island, becoming a weekday host in the 10a.m. to noon time slot. Kane and WNRI parted ways in 2009.

Dave Kane returned to the airwaves as a weekend host on WARA (formerly WRNP and WARL) in Attleboro, Massachusetts and currently occupies the 9a.m. to noon time slot on Saturdays.

== "Father Misgivings" ==
Aside from being involved in talk radio, Kane's second major source of livelihood is his work as a performance artist. Kane is well-known regionally for creating the character of Father Misgivings, an Irish Catholic priest. In this one man play, which Kane describes as featuring "blessings, Blarney, belly laughs and Bingo," the character of Father Misgivings tells stories and relates his views about the idiosyncrasies of growing up and living life as a Roman Catholic. Kane performs the show many times each year, usually in the form of a dinner theater, in venues throughout New England.

== The Station nightclub fire ==
Kane's son, Nicholas O'Neill, at age 18, was the youngest victim of The Station nightclub fire of 2003 in which 100 people lost their lives. In the wake of this tragedy, Kane became a strong proponent of fire safety awareness and the enforcement of strict laws for the administration of fire safety inspections on public buildings. Kane was publicly opposed to Rhode Island Attorney General Patrick C. Lynch's handling of the criminal trials of those involved in negligence leading to the fire.

== 41 Signs of Hope ==
In 2006, Kane authored his first published book, 41 Signs of Hope. In the book, Kane shares anecdotes of synchronistic, and at times, seemingly supernatural occurrences revolving around the number 41, which Kane and his family contend are communications from the spirit of his son Nicholas.

== Documentary ==
On February 20, 2007, 4 years after the fire, the documentary, 41, which is about Kane's son Nicholas who died in the Station nightclub fire in 2003 was released. It is directed by Christian de Rezendes and Christian O'Neill.
