= The Station nightclub fire =

2003 deadly fire at a rock concert in West Warwick, Rhode Island, USA

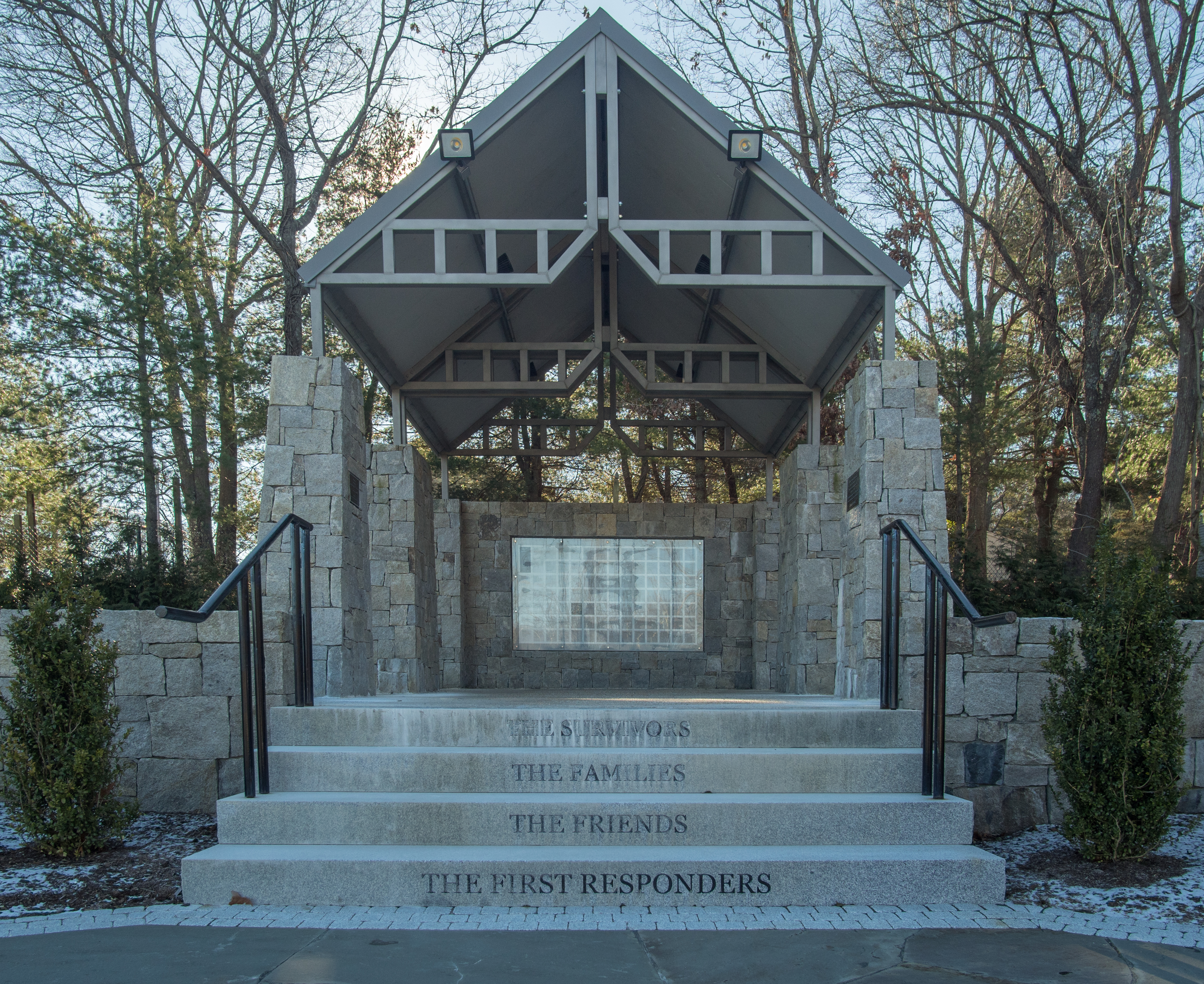
- Station Fire Memorial Park
- Location of The Station nightclub
- Date: February 20, 2003; 23 years ago
- Time: 11:07 p.m. (EST)
- Location: 211 Cowesett Avenue, West Warwick, Rhode Island, U.S.; 41°41′04″N 71°30′39″W
- Cause: Fireworks accident (ignition of acoustic foam by pyrotechnics)
- Filmed by: Brian Butler
- Deaths: 100 (Note: 96 at the scene, 4 in hospitals)
- Injuries: 230
- Property damage: Total loss of building
- Suspects: Daniel Biechele, Michael Derderian and Jeffrey Derderian
- Verdict: Biechele: Pled guilty Derderian and Derderian: No contest
- Convictions: 100 counts of involuntary manslaughter

On the evening of February 20, 2003, a fire occurred at The Station, a nightclub and music venue in West Warwick, Rhode Island, United States, killing 100 people and injuring 230. During a concert by the rock band Jack Russell's Great White, an offshoot of the original Great White band, a pyrotechnic display accidentally ignited flammable acoustic foam in the walls and ceilings surrounding the stage. Within six minutes, the entire building was engulfed in flames. The fire remains the deadliest firework accident in U.S. history and the fourth-deadliest nightclub fire in U.S. history. It was also the second-deadliest nightclub fire in New England, behind the 1942 Cocoanut Grove fire.

After the fire, multiple civil and criminal cases were filed. Daniel Biechele, the tour manager for Great White who had ignited the pyrotechnics, pleaded guilty to 100 counts of involuntary manslaughter in 2006 and was sentenced to fifteen years in prison with four to serve. Biechele was released from prison in 2008 after some families of the victims expressed support for his parole. Jeffrey and Michael Derderian, the owners of The Station, pleaded no contest and avoided a trial: Michael received the same sentence as Biechele and was released from prison in 2009, while Jeffrey received a sentence of 500 hours of community service. Legal action against several parties, including Great White, was resolved with monetary settlements by 2008.

Station Fire Memorial Park, a permanent memorial to the fire victims, was opened in May 2017 at the site where The Station once stood.

== Background ==
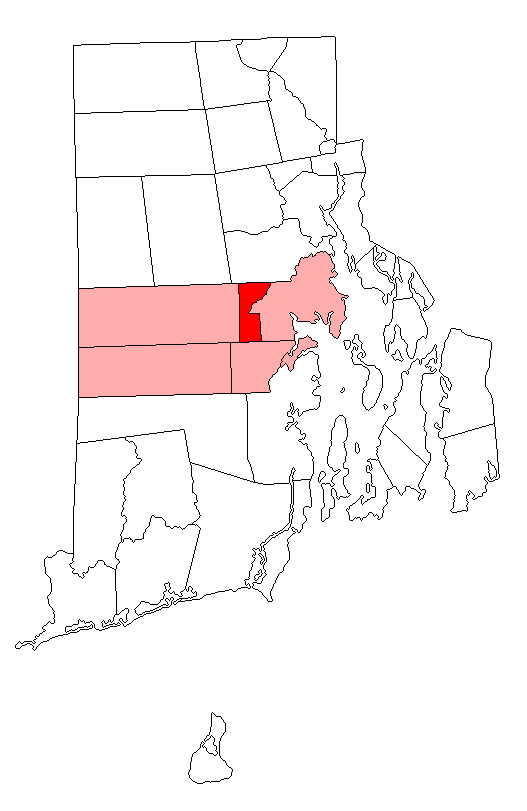
Location of West Warwick (in dark red) in Kent County, Rhode Island (in light red)

=== The Station ===
The Station was a nightclub located at 211 Cowesett Avenue at the corner of Kulas Road in West Warwick, Rhode Island. The building that would become The Station was built in 1946 and was originally used as a gin mill, a type of bar.

Before being converted into a nightclub and concert venue, the Station building had been used as a restaurant and tavern. A fire had previously occurred at the building in 1972 while it was used as a restaurant called Julio's. No occupants were in the building during the 1972 fire, but the interior was significantly damaged. Another restaurant opened in the building in 1974. In 1985, it was converted to a pub, which closed sometime in the late 1980s, and a nightclub was opened in 1991. The nightclub was purchased by brothers Michael and Jeffrey Derderian in March 2000.

In the months before the fire, the building had been inspected twice by West Warwick fire marshal Denis Larocque. The club was cited for nine minor code violations during the first inspection in November 2002 but was not cited for the flammable polyurethane foam the venue used for soundproofing, which was against code. The follow-up inspection in December 2002 also did not cite the foam, and the inspector gave the building an "All OK" rating on his inspection form. Larocque later told the Rhode Island State Police that he had not spotted the polyurethane foam during the November 2002 inspection because he was upset after finding an illegal inward swinging door that he had previously asked to be removed from the building.

Before the fire, The Station often hosted concerts by 1980s hard rock groups and tribute bands. Local bands that had played at The Station before the fire had used pyrotechnics during their concerts without incident, including a Kiss tribute band that had set off fireballs during their show in August 2002.

=== Great White ===
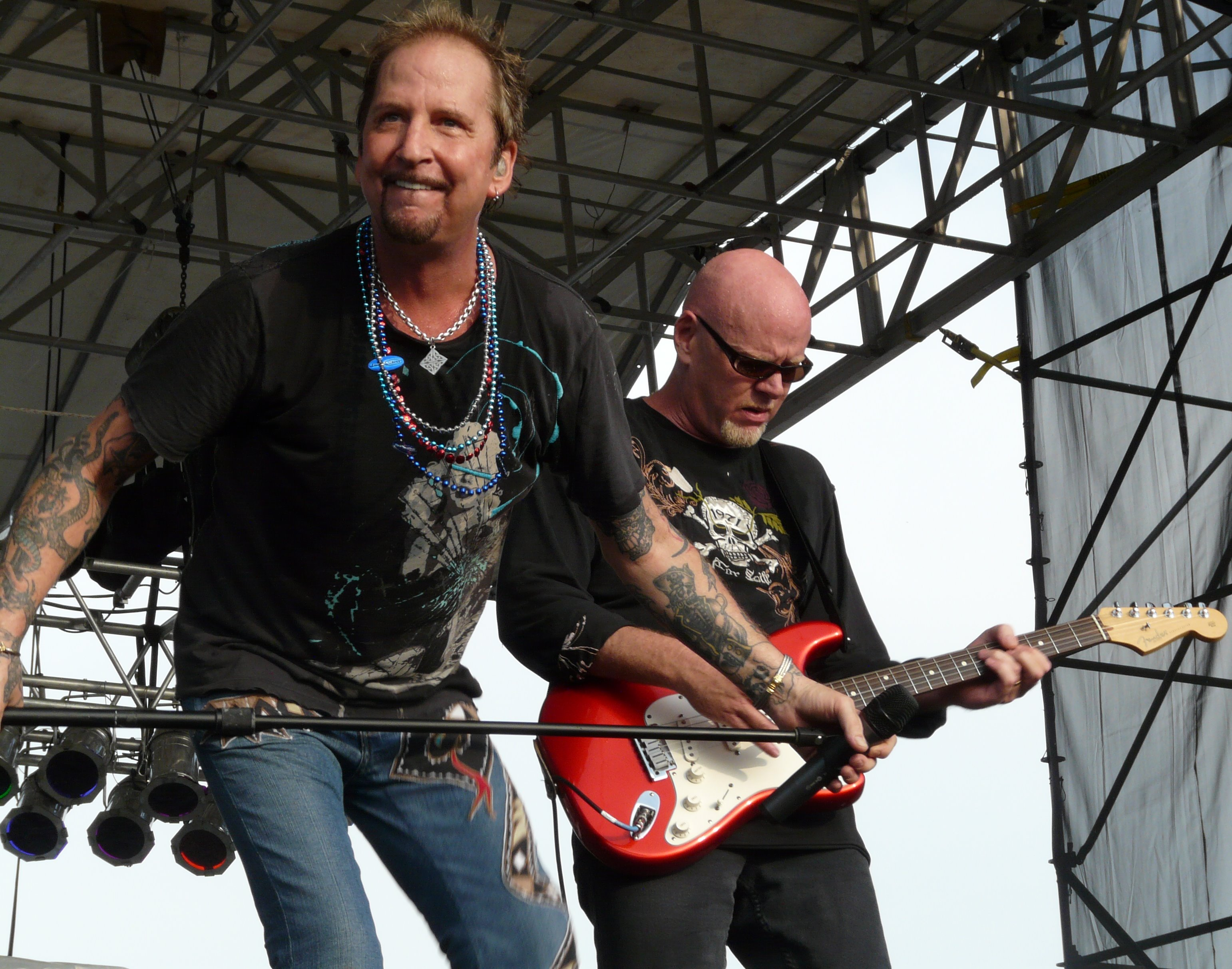
Great White's co-founders Jack Russell (left) and Mark Kendall (right) in 2008

For their 2003 tour, the official name of the headlining band of the February 20 concert was billed as Jack Russell's Great White, which was an offshoot of the original band Great White and led by lead singer Jack Russell. The original band had risen to fame as part of the glam metal scene of the late 1980s and early 1990s. They were best known for their 1989 cover of Ian Hunter's "Once Bitten, Twice Shy", which reached the Top 5 of the Billboard Hot 100. At the time of their performance at the Station, there were two of Great White's original members in the lineup: lead singer Russell and guitarist Mark Kendall. Kendall, who had co-founded the band with Russell in 1977, had rejoined Russell's version of the group in 2002. The rest of the lineup included guitarist Ty Longley, who died in the fire, bass guitarist David Filice, and drummer Eric Powers. Great White's popularity had waned in the decade before the Station fire, and this iteration of the band had been performing on a touring circuit of small clubs with capacities of up to 500 people. Although the band was officially known as Jack Russell's Great White at the time, and their tour was initially named after Russell's 2002 solo album For You, they were billed by The Station as simply "Great White" in error.

In February 2003, Jack Russell's Great White was on an eighteen-date concert tour. They had been using a pyrotechnic display during their performances, which some club owners had denied them permission to use, citing safety concerns. Dominic Santana, the owner of The Stone Pony in Asbury Park, New Jersey, told reporters that the band had used pyrotechnics during their February 14, 2003, performance at the venue without his permission, and their contract and rider did not mention pyrotechnics displays. In the aftermath of the fire, the band and the owners of The Station disputed whether the band were allowed to use the pyrotechnic display during their concert.

Jack Russell's Great White had two opening acts for the February 20 concert: Trip, a group from Vancouver, Washington, and Fathead, a local Rhode Island band. All the members of Trip escaped the Station without injury, but two members of Fathead, cousins Keith and Steven Mancini, along with Steven's wife Andrea, died in the fire.

The concert was hosted by Michael Gonsalves, a disc jockey for Providence rock radio station WHJY who was also known as "Doctor Metal". Gonsalves was the host of the WHJY program The Metal Zone, at the time the longest-running heavy metal radio program in the United States.

== Fire ==
Screenshot of the Butler video, showing the beginning of the fire

=== Ignition ===
Jack Russell's Great White started their performance at 11:07 p.m. on February 20. Despite the club's maximum licensed capacity being cited as 404, a total of 462 people were in attendance during the concert.

The fire started shortly after the band began performing their opening song, "Desert Moon". During the performance, pyrotechnics set off by tour manager Daniel Biechele began to ignite the flammable acoustic foam on both sides and the top center of the drummer's alcove at the back of the stage. The pyrotechnics were gerbs, cylindrical devices that produce a controlled spray of sparks. Biechele used four gerbs that were set to spray sparks 15 feet (4.6 m) in the air for fifteen seconds. Two gerbs were at 45° angles, with the middle two pointing straight up. The flanking gerbs became the principal cause of the fire.

Within a few seconds, multiple sparks from the gerbs ignited the insulation foam, and flames were visible on the wall above the stage nine seconds thereafter. The flames were initially thought to be part of the act; only as the fire continued to grow rapidly and reach the ceiling and smoke quickly began to bank down did people realize it was uncontrolled. Twenty seconds after the pyrotechnics ended, the band stopped playing, the crowd began to back away from the stage, and lead singer Jack Russell calmly remarked into the microphone, "Wow... that's not good." Within 40 seconds of the ignition, Great White stopped playing and left the stage as The Station's fire alarm began to sound, although it was not connected to the local fire department. The Station had no sprinkler system. Thick smoke began to rapidly fill The Station one minute after the ignition, and the crowd began to evacuate the building in a frenzied panic. The fire continued to quickly spread through the building and completely engulfed it within six minutes of the pyrotechnic ignition.

=== Response ===
By this time, the nightclub's fire alarm had activated, and although there were four possible exits, most people headed for the front door through which they entered. Around 275 people attempted to evacuate the building at the front entrance, but only the first 90 people managed to evacuate, which resulted in a large crowd crush in the narrow hallway that led to that exit being blocked completely, and resulted in numerous deaths and injuries among the patrons and staff. Multiple survivors claimed that two bouncers blocked the stage door as attendees attempted to escape the building, stating the door was for use by the band, although 20 people managed to exit through that door. Twelve people managed to exit through a door meant for employees, while another 54 people evacuated through the emergency exit in the bar area. Some people who escaped the building broke windows on the left and right sides of the front of the building, providing a quick and safe exit for 24 and 54 people respectively.

The fire was reported to the West Warwick Fire Department by cellphone calls to 911 within sixty seconds of ignition. A West Warwick police officer already at the scene also reported the fire to police dispatch. The first West Warwick fire engine arrived at the scene at 11:13 p.m., followed by three other trucks shortly thereafter. Hundreds of firefighters responded to the fire, including every available West Warwick firefighter. Fire departments in Warwick, Coventry, and Cranston rendered mutual aid to the fire site. The Cowesett Inn restaurant across the street from The Station acted as an ad hoc burn triage and command center for first responders. A portion of the nightclub roof collapsed at 11:57 p.m., and a second portion in the building's sunroom collapsed at 12:07 a.m.. Individuals who needed medical treatment were transported to Kent Hospital, which was filled to maximum capacity due to the fire. By 1:30 a.m. on February 21, all the affected individuals had been transported and the street had been cleared.

=== Aftermath and casualties ===
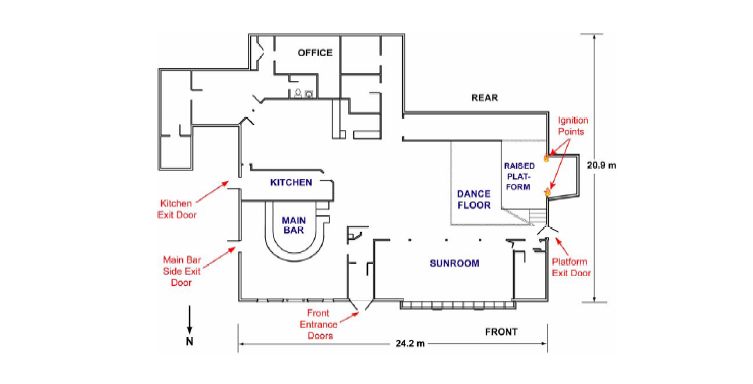
Floor plan of Station nightclub, showing available exits

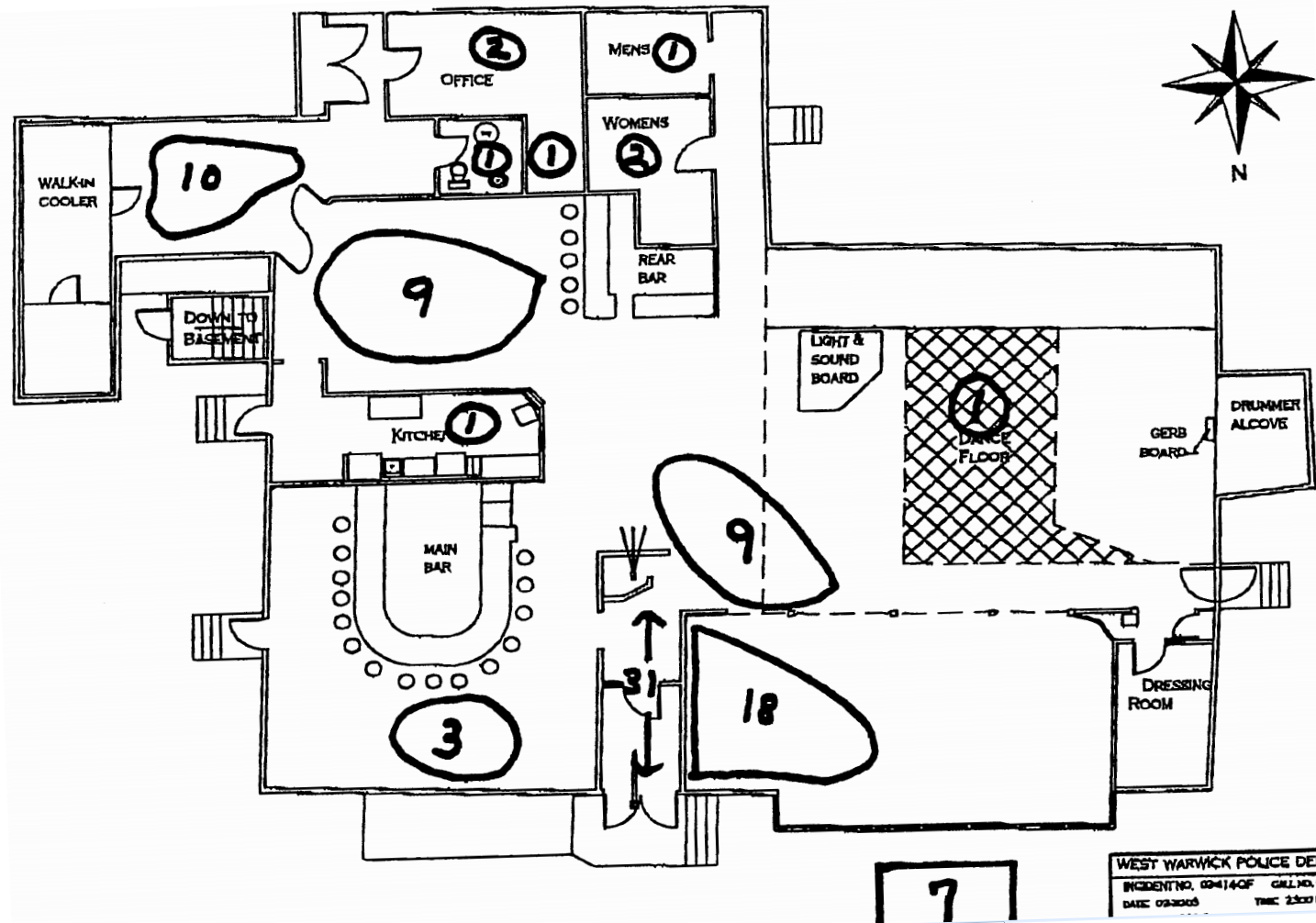
Number of victims found by location (main exit at bottom-center)

Of the 462 people in the building for the concert, 100 (approximately 21.5%) were killed, 230 (approximately 50%) were injured, and 132 (approximately 28.5%) escaped uninjured. Longley and Gonsalves were among those who died in the fire. A total of 96 individuals died at the scene, and four more died in the hospital in the following days and weeks. The 100th and final person to die from fire-related injuries was 33-year old Pam Gruttadauria, of Johnston, Rhode Island on May 4, 2003. Four employees of The Station were killed in the fire. In April 2003, the Derderians were fined $1.07 million for failing to carry workers' compensation insurance for their employees. In an attempt to avoid the fine, the Derderians filed for bankruptcy in September 2005, and subsequently filed an appeal. The fine was not resolved until 2013, ten years after the fire, when a judge upheld it.

Providence Phoenix columnist Ian Donnis wrote of the effect that the fire had on the close-knit Rhode Island community, "The loss of so much life would represent a tragedy anywhere, but it struck especially hard in Rhode Island, the nation's smallest state, where no place is more than an hour away by car..." Many of the survivors of the fire developed post-traumatic stress disorder after the event.

=== Recording and account ===
From inception the fire was caught on videotape by cameraman Brian Butler for WPRI-TV of Providence, and the beginning of that tape was released to national news stations. Butler was present for a planned piece on nightclub safety being reported by Jeffrey A. Derderian, a WPRI news reporter who was also a part-owner of The Station. The report had been inspired by the E2 nightclub stampede in Chicago that killed 21 people three days earlier. Derderian had begun working for WPRI on February 17, three days before the fire. WPRI-TV and Derderian were criticized for the conflict of interest in having a reporter report on his own property. Derderian resigned from WPRI on June 30.

At the scene of the fire, Butler gave this account of the tragedy:

It was that fast. As soon as the pyrotechnics stopped, the flame had started on the egg crate backing behind the stage, and it just went up the ceiling. And people stood and watched it, and some people backed off. When I turned around, some people were already trying to leave, and others were just sitting there going, "Yes, that's great!" And I remember that statement, because I was, like, this is not great. This is the time to leave.

At first, there was no panic. Everybody just kind of turned. Most people still just stood there. In the other rooms, the smoke hadn't gotten to them, the flame wasn't that bad, they didn't think anything of it. Well, I guess once we all started to turn toward the door, and we got bottlenecked into the front door, people just kept pushing, and eventually everyone popped out of the door, including myself.

That's when I turned back. I went around back. There was no one coming out the back door anymore. I kicked out a side window to try to get people out of there. One guy did crawl out. I went back around the front again, and that's when you saw people stacked on top of each other, trying to get out of the front door. And by then, the black smoke was pouring out over their heads.

I noticed when the pyro stopped, the flame had kept going on both sides. And then on one side, I noticed it come over the top, and that's when I said, 'I have to leave.' And I turned around, I said, 'Get out, get out, get to the door, get to the door!' And people just stood there.

There was a table in the way at the door, and I pulled that out just to get it out of the way so people could get out easier. And I never expected it to take off as fast as it did. It just—‌it was so fast. It had to be two minutes tops before the whole place was black smoke.

== Investigation ==
=== NIST report ===
The National Institute of Standards and Technology (NIST) investigated the fire under the authority of the National Construction Safety Team Act. Using computer simulations with FDS and a mockup of the stage area and dance floor, the investigation concluded that a fire sprinkler system would have contained the fire long enough to give everyone time to exit safely. The NIST report was released on March 3, 2005, and was made available in two parts on June 30, 2005.

At various times it has been reported that The Station, built in 1946, was exempt from the requirement for a sprinkler system by virtue of a grandfather clause that existed in Rhode Island fire code at the time of the fire.

Shortly after the fire, Rhode Island lawmakers passed the Comprehensive Fire Safety Act of 2003, which abolished the grandfather clause and required the owners of all older buildings to install sprinkler systems in their facilities.

=== Grand jury investigation ===
An investigation of the fire by a Rhode Island state grand jury was started by then-Rhode Island Attorney General Patrick Lynch on February 26, 2003. On December 9, 2003, the grand jury announced indictments against Station owners Jeffrey and Michael Derderian and Jack Russell's Great White road manager Daniel M. Biechele. The three were each charged with 100 counts of involuntary manslaughter with criminal negligence and 100 counts of involuntary manslaughter in violation of a misdemeanor. West Warwick fire marshal Denis Larocque was not charged by the grand jury, as a state law prevented charges against fire marshals without proof of bad faith. The grand jury also did not return charges against the band's lead singer, Jack Russell.

Lynch told 48 Hours that his investigation found that the fire spread quickly due to the foam the Derderians installed in The Station's walls and ceilings in response to noise complaints. The lack of usable exits was also a factor, as was the inward door Larocque had found and asked to be removed. Jeffrey Derderian said the door was also installed due to noise, and they had removed it as asked, but sometimes re-installed it if the venue was going to be loud, and the band used it to escape the building during the fire. Michael Derderian told 48 Hours that it was "Undisputable" [sic] that the building's use of flammable packing foam instead of flame retardant sound foam was the cause of the fire's spread, but the brothers claimed that they had ordered sound foam and had received the packing foam instead.

=== Other causes ===
The foam was sold to the Derderians by American Foam. In 2005, the Rhode Island Attorney General office received a fax from Barry Warner, a former employee of American Foam who lived nearby The Station, who claimed the company knew about the dangers of polyurethane foam but did not warn their employees about it. Although Warner was called to testify to a grand jury, he was not asked about the fax. American Foam disputed the claims in Warner's fax. In 2008, American Foam agreed to pay $6.3 million to the families of the victims of the fire.

Victims' families have also cited overcrowding in the venue as a cause for the casualties during the fire. Larocque had set various capacities for The Station in the years before the fire based on whether pool tables and other items could be moved. The capacity for the Station was either 258 or 404, depending on how the building was being used. The final tally by The Providence Journal of people inside the Station during the fire was 462.

== Criminal trials ==
=== Daniel Biechele ===
The first criminal trial was against Jack Russell's Great White's tour manager, Daniel Michael Biechele, 26, from Orlando, Florida. This trial was scheduled to start May 1, 2006, but Biechele, against his lawyers' advice, pleaded guilty to 100 counts of involuntary manslaughter on February 7, 2006, in what he said was an effort to "bring peace, I want this to be over with."

==== Sentencing and statement ====
On May 10, 2006, prosecutor Randall White requested a ten-year prison sentence for Biechele, the maximum allowed under the plea bargain, arguing it was warranted due to the death toll from the fire, and to establish "societal deterrence" about the consequences of ignoring safety rules. Speaking to the public for the first time since the fire, Biechele stated:

For three years, I've wanted to be able to speak to the people that were affected by this tragedy, but I know that there's nothing that I can say or do that will undo what happened that night.

Since the fire, I have wanted to tell the victims and their families how truly sorry I am for what happened that night and the part that I had in it. I never wanted anyone to be hurt in any way. I never imagined that anyone ever would be.

I know how this tragedy has devastated me, but I can only begin to understand what the people who lost loved ones have endured. I don't know that I'll ever forgive myself for what happened that night, so I can't expect anybody else to.

I can only pray that they understand that I would do anything to undo what happened that night and give them back their loved ones.

I'm so sorry for what I have done, and I don't want to cause anyone any more pain.

I will never forget that night, and I will never forget the people that were hurt by it.

I am so sorry.

Superior Court Judge Francis Darigan Jr. sentenced Biechele to fifteen years in prison, with four to serve and eleven years suspended, plus three years' probation, for his role in the fire. Darigan remarked, "The greatest sentence that can be imposed on you has been imposed on you by yourself." Biechele was released in March 2008.

The sentence drew mixed reactions in the courtroom. Many families believed the punishment was just; others had hoped for a more severe sentence.

==== Support for parole and aftermath ====
On September 4, 2007, some victims' families expressed their support for Biechele's parole. Leland Hoisington, whose 28-year-old daughter, Abbie, was killed in the fire, told reporters, "I think they should not even bother with a hearing—‌just let Biechele out [...] I just don't find him [...] guilty of anything." The state parole board received approximately twenty letters, the majority of which expressed their sympathy and support for Biechele, some going as far as to describe him as a "scapegoat" with limited responsibility. Parole Board chairwoman Lisa Holley told journalists of her surprise at the forgiving attitude of the families, saying, "I think the most overwhelming part of it for me was the depth of forgiveness of many of these families that have sustained such a loss."

Dave Kane and Joanne O'Neill, parents of the youngest victim Nicholas O'Neill, released their letter to the board to reporters. "In the period following this tragedy, it was Mr. Biechele, alone, who stood up and admitted responsibility for his part in this horrible event [...] He apologized to the families of the victims and made no attempt to mitigate his guilt," the letter said. Others pointed out that Biechele sent handwritten letters to the family of each of the 100 victims and that he had a work release position in a local charity.

On September 19, 2007, the Rhode Island Parole Board announced that Biechele would be released in March 2008. Biechele was released from prison on March 19, 2008.

Biechele's parole and probation expired in March 2011. As of 2013, Biechele lived in Florida with his wife and two children.

=== Michael and Jeffrey Derderian ===
Following Biechele's trial, The Station's owners, Michael and Jeffrey Derderian, were to receive separate trials. However, on September 21, 2006, Judge Darigan announced that the brothers had changed their pleas from "not guilty" to "no contest", thereby avoiding a trial. Michael Derderian received fifteen years in prison, with four to serve and eleven years suspended, plus three years' probation—the same sentence as Biechele. Jeffrey Derderian received 500 hours of community service.

In a letter to the victims' families, Judge Darigan wrote that he accepted the deal because he wanted to avoid "Public exposition of the tragic, explicit and horrific events experienced by the victims of this fire, both living and dead." He added that the difference in the brothers' sentences reflected their respective involvement with the purchase and installation of the flammable foam. Rhode Island Attorney General Patrick C. Lynch objected strenuously to the plea bargain, saying that both brothers should have received jail time and that Michael Derderian should have received more time than Biechele.

In January 2008, the Parole Board decided to grant Michael Derderian an early release; he was scheduled to be released from prison in September 2009, but was released three months earlier in June, due to good behavior.

== Civil settlements ==
As of September 2008, at least $115 million in settlement agreements had been paid, or offered, to the victims or their families by various defendants:

- In September 2008, The Jack Russell Tour Group Inc. offered $1 million in a settlement to survivors and victims' relatives, the maximum allowed under the band's insurance plan.
- Club owners Jeffrey and Michael Derderian reached a settlement of $813,000 with survivors and victims' families in September 2008.
- The State of Rhode Island and the town of West Warwick each agreed to pay $10 million as a settlement, due to the negligence of the fire marshal in the performance of his duties.
- Sealed Air Corporation agreed to pay $25 million as a settlement. Victims' lawyers said that Sealed Air made the polyethylene foam that was installed at the Station in 1996 in the drummer's alcove. This sat behind the subsequently installed soundproofing foam used throughout the larger area of the club, and produced toxic gas when it burned during the fire.
- In February 2008, Providence television station WPRI-TV and its then-owners LIN TV made an out-of-court settlement of $30 million as a result of the claim that their video journalist Brian Butler obstructed escape and did not sufficiently help people exit.
- In March 2008, JBL Speakers settled out of court for $815,000. JBL was accused of using flammable foam inside their speakers. The company denied any wrongdoing.
- Anheuser-Busch has offered $5 million. McLaughlin & Moran, Anheuser-Busch's distributor, has offered $16 million.
- Home Depot and Polar Industries, Inc. (a Connecticut-based insulation company) made a settlement offer of $5 million.
- Providence radio station WHJY-FM promoted the show, which was emcee'd by its DJ, Mike "The Doctor" Gonsalves (who was a casualty that night). Clear Channel Broadcasting, WHJY's parent company, paid a settlement of $22 million in February 2008.
- American Foam Corporation, which sold the insulation to The Station nightclub, agreed in 2008 to pay $6.3 million to settle lawsuits relating to the fire.

In 2021, 48 Hours described the total civil payments to the victims and families as $176 million.

== Memorials and benefits ==
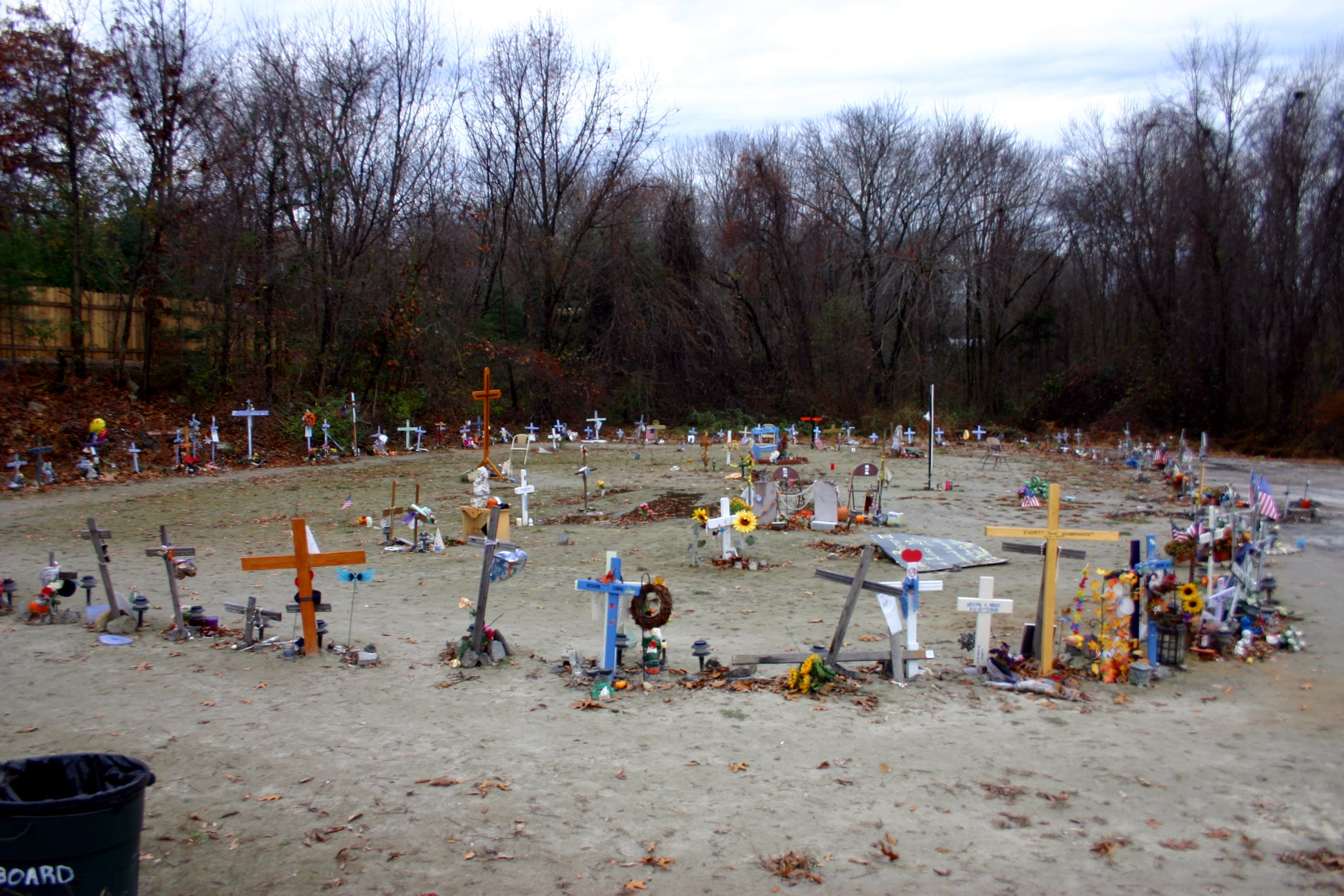
Makeshift memorial at the site of The Station nightclub prior to the building of the Station Memorial Park

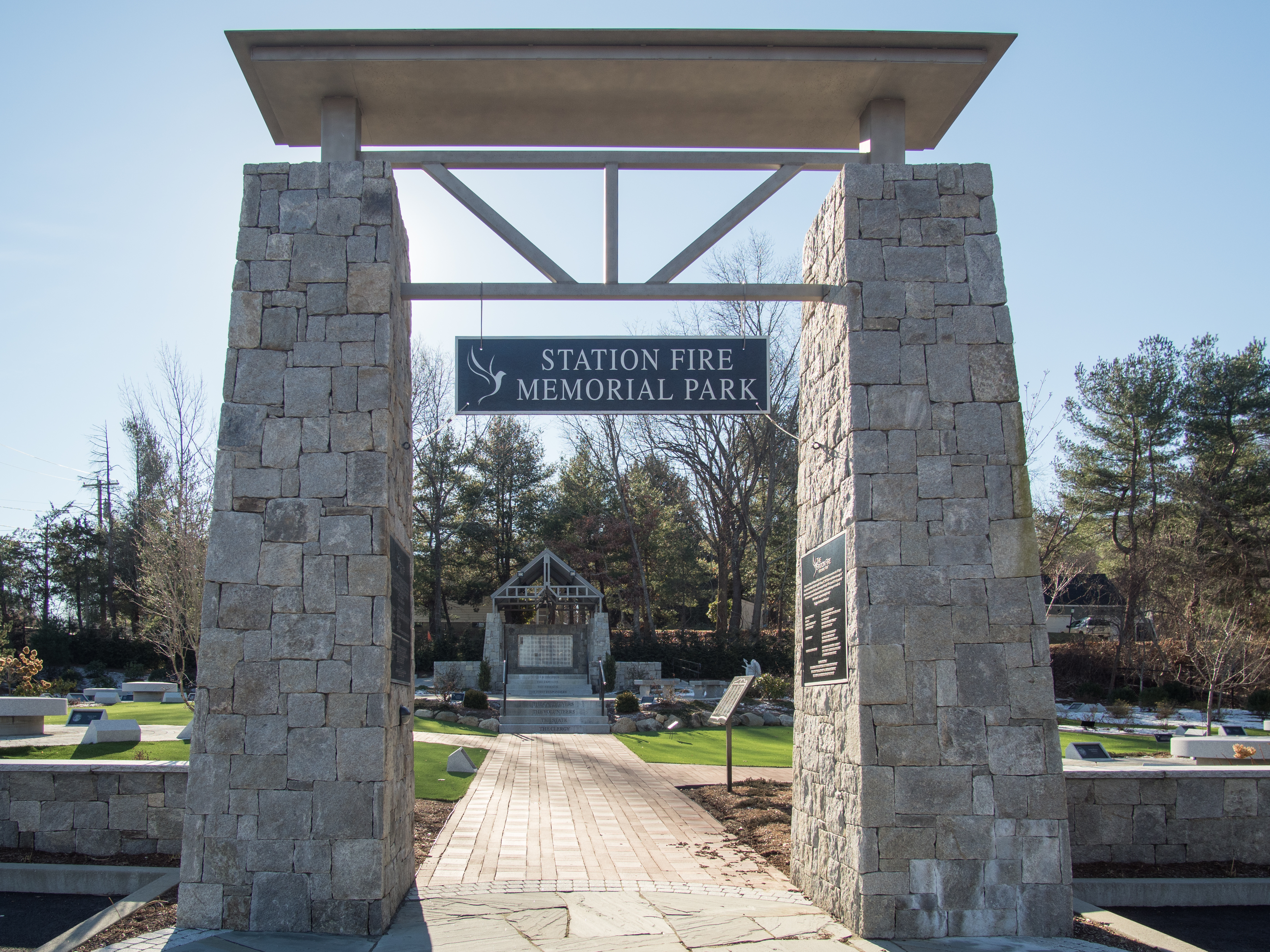
The entrance to the Station Fire Memorial Park

Thousands of mourners attended an interfaith memorial service at St. Gregory the Great Church in Warwick on February 24, 2003, to remember those lost in the fire. Another memorial was later that night at the West Warwick Civic Center.

A benefit memorial concert was held in February 2008 at the Dunkin' Donuts Center in Providence and featured performances by Tesla, Twisted Sister, Winger, Gretchen Wilson, and John Rich. The event raised at least $25,000 in donations for the Station Family Fund, and was broadcast in March by VH1 and VH1 Classic.

On the twentieth anniversary of the fire on February 20, 2023, Rhode Island governor Dan McKee ordered flags in Rhode Island lowered to half-staff for the day and the Rhode Island State House to be illuminated in memory of the 100 victims.

=== Station Fire Memorial Park ===
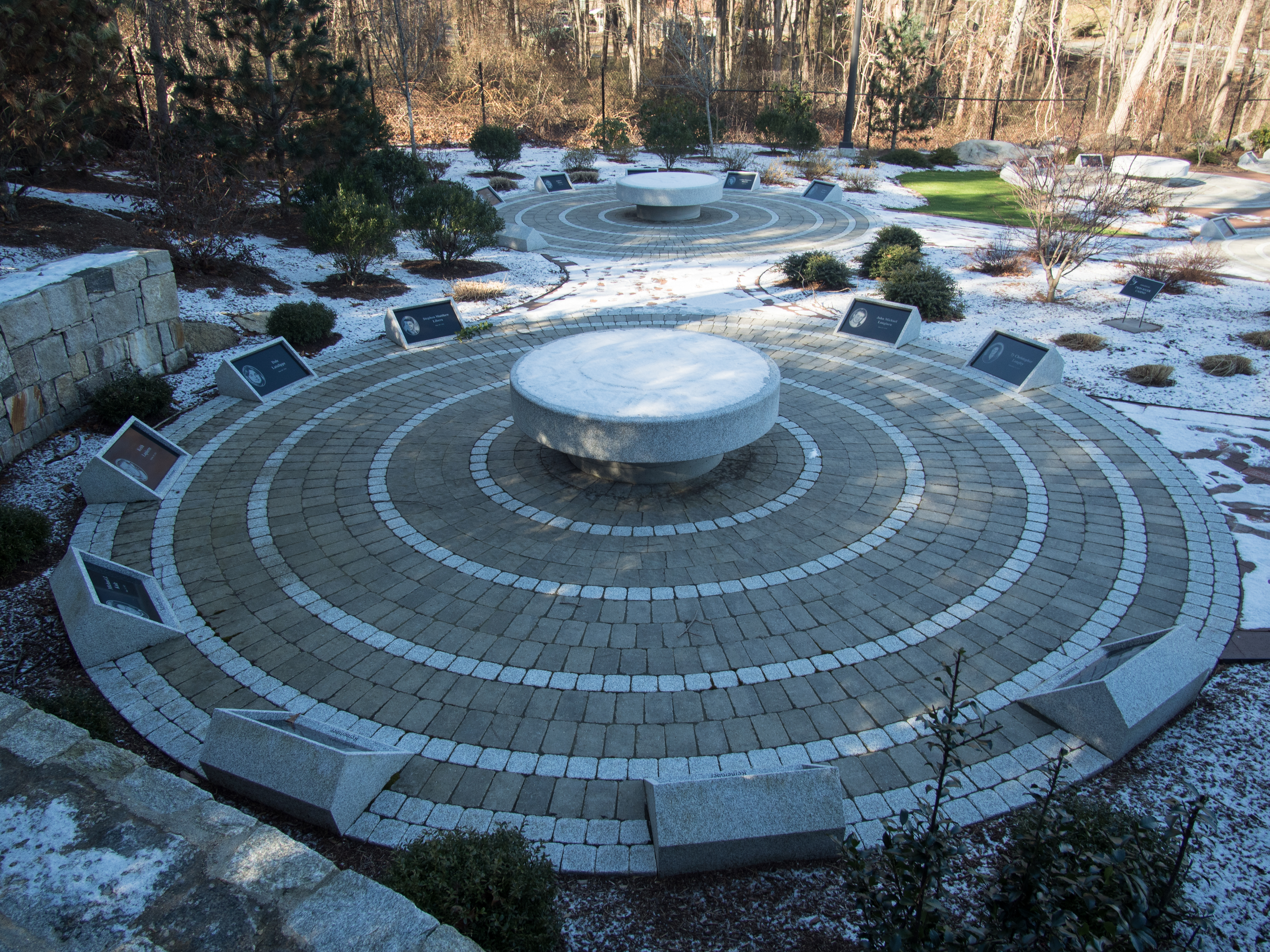
Station Fire Memorial Park in December 2018

The site of the fire was cleared, and a multitude of crosses were placed as memorials left by loved ones of the deceased. On May 20, 2003, nondenominational services began to be held at the fire site for several months. Access remains open to the public, and memorial services are held each February 20.

A permanent memorial at the site of the fire has been erected and named the Station Fire Memorial Park. In August 2016, the site was reported to have been being used as a PokeStop in Pokémon Go, much to the strong disapproval from the victims' families. In response, the stop was removed from the game by developer Niantic later that month.

In June 2003, the Station Fire Memorial Foundation (SFMF) was formed to purchase the property to build and maintain a memorial. In September 2012, the owner of the land, Ray Villanova, donated the site to the SFMF. By April 2016, $1.65 million of the $2 million fundraising goal had been achieved and construction of the Station Fire Memorial Park had commenced. The memorial dedication ceremony took place on May 21, 2017.

== Aftermath ==
=== Great White, Jack Russell, and Mark Kendall ===
Russell considered disbanding Great White after the fire but reconsidered when he decided to embark on a benefit tour. The tour started five months after the fire, and each concert began with a prayer for survivors and families. The band raised $185,000 for the Station Family Fund during the tour. The band initially retired "Desert Moon", the song they were performing when the fire began, from their concert setlist. "I don't think I could ever sing that song again," said Russell. Kendall said in 2005, "We haven't played that song. Things that bring back memories of that night we try to stay away from. And that song reminds us of that night. We haven't played it since then and probably never will."

Two years to the day after the fire, band members Russell and Kendall, along with Great White's attorney, Ed McPherson, appeared on CNN's Larry King Live with three survivors of the fire and the father of Longley, to discuss how their lives had changed since the incident.

Russell left Great White in 2010. In the years following the fire, Great White split into two separate groups, one led by Russell and the other by Kendall. When Russell launched his version of the band in 2012, Kendall's group responded that Russell had no right to use the name. After a 2013 legal settlement between the two parties, Kendall's band retained the Great White name, while Russell's band was allowed to use the name Jack Russell's Great White. By 2013, Russell's group had resumed playing "Desert Moon".

Russell performed a benefit show in February 2013 in Hermosa Beach, California, commemorating the tenth anniversary of the fire. Russell planned to donate the proceeds to the Station Fire Memorial Foundation. However, the organization asked to be disassociated from the concert, citing the animosity that many survivors and surviving families still felt. Russell raised about $180 from the concert, but the Memorial Foundation refused the donation, a decision supported by Kendall. In 2013, Kendall told The Providence Journal that he maintained amicable contact with some survivors, victims' families, and the Station Fire Memorial Foundation. Russell's relation with some survivors and families had been strained, although he remained close to Longley's family.

Neither version of Great White performed in any of the six New England states for over a decade following the fire. Russell's group made its first New England appearance in twelve years at a harvest festival in Mechanic Falls, Maine, in August 2015. Kendall's version of Great White was to perform at the Mohegan Sun casino in Uncasville, Connecticut, alongside Stryper and Steven Adler on March 25, 2023, but the venue indefinitely postponed the concert on March 2, citing its proximity to the twentieth anniversary of the fire.

Russell died on August 7, 2024 from complications of Lewy body dementia.

=== Others ===
41, a documentary about Nicholas O'Neill, the youngest victim of the fire, was screened at Rhode Island theaters in 2008. 41 and a film based on O'Neill's play They Walk Among Us were aired by Rhode Island PBS in February 2013 in conjunction with the tenth anniversary of the fire.

Gonsalves was inducted into the Rhode Island Radio and Television Hall of Fame in 2013.

The Derderian brothers conducted their first television interview about the fire in 2021 for 48 Hours. Some victims' families criticized the 48 Hours segment and the Derderians' involvement.

=== Safety measures ===
Following the tragedy, Governor Donald Carcieri declared a moratorium on pyrotechnic displays at venues that hold fewer than 300 people. The Rhode Island state fire code was changed after the fire to require every nightclub in the state with a capacity of more than 150 people to have a sprinkler system installed.

As numerous violations of existing codes contributed to the severity of the fire, there was an immediate effort to strengthen fire code protections. Within weeks, the National Fire Protection Association committee met to regulate code for "assembly occupancies". Based upon its work, Tentative Interim Amendments (TIAs) were issued for the national standard "Life Safety Code" (NFPA 101) in July 2003. The TIAs required automatic fire sprinklers in all existing nightclubs and similar locations accommodating more than 100 occupants, and all new locations in the same categories. The TIAs also required additional crowd manager personnel, among other things. These TIAs were subsequently incorporated into the 2006 edition of NFPA 101, along with additional exit requirements for new nightclub occupancies. It is left for each state or local jurisdiction to legally enact and enforce the current code changes.

A training curriculum for crowd managers was developed with the participation of the International Association of Fire Chiefs, focusing on preventing and preparing for fires and other emergencies.

=== Legislation ===
Inspired by the fire, the Fire Sprinkler Incentive Act has been proposed in the United States Senate and House of Representatives since 2003. The legislation would create a tax incentive for property owners to install fire sprinkler systems. It was last introduced in the House in 2015 by then-U.S. Reps. James Langevin of Rhode Island and Tom Reed of New York.

== See also ==
- E2 nightclub stampede, which occurred three days before this event
- List of fireworks accidents and incidents
- List of nightclub fires
