= M. Teresa Paiva-Weed =

American politician

Teresa Paiva-Weed

2nd President of the Rhode Island Senate
- In office January 6, 2009 – March 24, 2017
- Preceded by: Joseph Montalbano
- Succeeded by: Dominick J. Ruggerio

Majority Leader of the Rhode Island Senate
- In office 2004 – January 6, 2009

Member of the Rhode Island Senate from the 13th district
- In office January 1993 – March 24, 2017
- Succeeded by: Dawn Euer

Personal details
- Born: Marie Teresa Paiva; November 5, 1959 (age 66) Newport, Rhode Island, U.S.
- Party: Democratic
- Spouse: Mark Weed (Deceased 2009)
- Education: Providence College; Catholic University of America

Marie Teresa Paiva-Weed (born November 5, 1959) is an American attorney and politician who served as President of the Rhode Island Senate. She is a member of the Democratic Party who represented the 13th District (Jamestown and Newport) from 2003 until 2013 and the 49th District (Jamestown, Middletown, and Newport) from 1993 to 2003. In November 2008, she was elected President of the Senate. She was Majority Leader from 2004 to 2008. Paiva-Weed left office in 2017 to become President of the Hospital Association of Rhode Island.

== Early life and education ==
M. Teresa née Paiva Weed was born on November 5, 1959, at the Newport Naval Hospital, in Newport, Rhode Island. She is the daughter of Arthur J. and Marie Paiva. Both parents were active in community charities and politics.

Paiva Weed was raised in Newport and graduated from Rogers High School in 1977. She received a Bachelor of Arts degree from Providence College. She would go on to earn a Juris Doctor degree from Catholic University. At an early age, Paiva Weed would meet her husband, Mark Weed, at school. The two would be married for 23 years before Mark Weed succumbed to cancer on August 22, 2009. She would later establish a memorial summer camp scholarship fund in his memory involving the Newport Gulls summer collegiate baseball team.

Pavia Weed served as an attorney for the law firm Moore, Virgadamo & Lynch. She retired from the practice in 2008.

== Rhode Island State Senate ==
=== Elections ===
Paiva-Weed first entered politics in 1992 when she ran for a seat in the 49th District of the Rhode Island Senate, winning 62% of the vote against Republican Ellen M. McDonagh. Following 2001 redistricting that reduced the Rhode Island Senate from 50 to 38 members, she faced a primary election in the new 13th District against fellow incumbent J. Clement Cicilline, winning 75% of the vote, then winning 74% against Republican Janine M. Atamian in the general election.

=== Tenure ===
Paiva-Weed has advanced steadily in the Rhode Island Senate. She was named Chair of the Judiciary Committee in 1997 and was selected as Senate Majority Leader in 2004. She is Rhode Island's first woman to serve as Senate Majority Leader.

=== Leadership ===
Paiva Weed was elected Senate President in 2009. She was the first Rhode Island woman to serve in that capacity.

==== Raimondo proposal for truck tolls ====
In response to the state's inability to fund major road projects to replace RIDOT infrastructure, the Governor proposed installing a system of tolls to be imposed on commercial and high capacity vehicles using the state's roadways. The Senate passed legislation in support of the measure, but the House, led by the Speaker, halted the advancement. Paiva Weed expressed dismay as to the maneuvers of the House Speaker in July, saying "I thought we were both working with the governor". The Senate legislation expired at the end of the term, and is expected to be of the most contentious issues in the next year.

==== LGBT rights ====
Paiva-Weed was known as an opponent of same-sex marriage. The Senate passed laws approving both civil unions and marriages for gay and lesbian couples during Paiva-Weed's tenure as Senate President. She voted in favor of the same-sex civil union bill which passed by 21 votes to 16 on June 29, 2011, hailing the occasion as a "historic day" for the state. On April 24, 2013, she voted against the same-sex marriage bill that passed in a 26–12 senate vote.

==== Casino gambling ====
In June 2010, Paiva Weed denied action to revive a voting proposal that then-Governor Carcieri vetoed that would have brought to the coming general election, the question of allowing table games at locations in Rhode Island. Before the vote and subsequent veto, the President excused herself from the dais, and from the Senate floor made a now notable plea to the Senate to reject the measure. The move was largely seen as an attempt to distance the Senate President from the battle being waged locally in her home district. Regardless, the Senate went on to approve the legislation in a vote 21 for, 14 against. In 2012, Paiva Weed would support the expansion of table games at Newport Grand Casino, but not at Quonset. She would later reverse her stance to oppose expansion for the Newport facility when the matter was re-visited in 2014 after the Newport City Council rejected the proposal locally and for the second time. She cited the growth of neighbouring casino projects as part of her reasoning.

==== Cannabis prohibition ====
In early 2015, Paiva Weed was quoted as being both open-minded and concerned regarding the movement to end cannabis prohibition in the State. She went further to say "Revenue is something that always gets people's attention. However, I believe that the decision to legalize marijuana should be made in conjunction with law enforcement and our health officials and not be revenue driven".
