= 41 (2007 film) =

2007 documentary film

- Directed by: Christian de Rezendes; Christian O'Neill
- Produced by: Christian de Rezendes; Christian O'Neill
- Cinematography: Christian de Rezendes; Christian O'Neill
- Edited by: Christian de Rezendes
- Music by: Nicky O’Neill; Michael Teoli
- Production companies: Breaking Branches Pictures; Nicky's Counting Productions
- Distributed by: Nehst
- Release date: February 20, 2007
- Running time: 112 minutes
- Country: United States
- Language: English
- Budget: $20,000

41 is an independent feature-length documentary about Nicholas O'Neill, the youngest victim of The Station nightclub fire, which claimed the lives of 100 people in West Warwick, Rhode Island, on February 20, 2003. The documentary, which was co-created by filmmakers Christian de Rezendes and Christian O'Neill (Nicholas's brother), interweaves the story of Nicholas's life, as described by his family, including his father, Dave Kane, and friends and illustrated with home videos, with footage from the film They Walk Among Us, which is based on a play of the same name written by Nicholas a year before he passed. The titular number, as described by the film, was of spiritual significance to Nicholas, although the reasons behind this are not fully known. The film also details how his family and friends believe that Nicholas may have prophetically known that he would die at a young age, and that he continues to communicate with them as a spirit, often through "signs" involving the number 41.

Several notable individuals either appear in the film or acted as consultants on it, including novelist Jon Land, writer Ann Hood, paranormal researcher Gary Schwartz, psychic mediums Robert Brown, Maureen Hancock and Cindy Gilman, and AVID co-creator Tom Ohanian. Both of the directors appear in the film and act as storytellers, relating their personal connection to the story.

== History ==
Christian de Rezendes describes in the film itself how he was inspired to after he himself had an experience of the number 41 which he believed may have been a sign from Nicholas.

== Release ==
To date, 41 has been played at nine film festivals across the United States and Canada, including the Bare Bones International Film Festival in Muskogee, Oklahoma, the Woods Hole Film Festival in Cape Cod, Massachusetts and the Blue Mountain Film Festival in Ontario, Canada. Reviews have been generally positive, including a five-star review from Film Threat. In 2008, the film was picked up for distribution by Nehst Studios, a production and distribution company headed by Larry Meistrich (producer of Sling Blade). Since that time, it has had two theatrical runs, both in its home state of Rhode Island. In 2007, the filmmakers were the featured guests on Beyond Reality Radio with Jason Hawes and Grant Wilson from the television program Ghost Hunters, which is based in Warwick, Rhode Island, close to the site of the Station fire.
