= Saint Joseph's Teachers' College =

St Joseph's Teachers College
- Established: 1897; 129 years ago
- Location: 17.9969°N 76.7839°W

St. Joseph's Teachers' College

St. Joseph's Teachers' College is a Roman Catholic teacher training college in Kingston, Jamaica. It was founded in 1897 by the Franciscan Sisters of Allegany, a religious order in the Roman Catholic Church in Jamaica.

The college campus contains dormitories to accommodate students from more distant areas. Over the years, the institution has undergone considerable development in its physical plant and academic programmes.

== Diploma programmes ==
As a member of the Joint Board of Teacher Education (part of the University of the West Indies, Mona, Jamaica), the College offers:

- Bachelor's degree in Teaching (Early Childhood & Primary),
- Diploma in Teaching (Primary& Early Childhood),
- Bachelor's degree in School Leadership & Management for principals, vice principals, senior teachers and trained teachers.

In collaboration with Mount Saint Vincent University, Halifax, Nova Scotia, the Ce College also offers the following part-time programmes:

- B.Ed. in Primary Education over five years,
- M. Ed. in Primary Education over two years.
