= Rhode Island Bar Association =

American unified legal association

- Abbreviation: RIBAR
- Formation: May 14, 1898; 128 years ago
- Founded at: Providence, Rhode Island, US
- Type: Legal Society
- Headquarters: 41 Sharpe Drive
- Location: Cranston, Rhode Island 02920, United States
- Members: 6,000+
- Website: http://www.ribar.com

The Rhode Island Bar Association (RIBAR or RIBA) is the unified (mandatory) bar association of the U.S. state of Rhode Island.

== Organization ==
The Rhode Island Bar Association was founded on May 14, 1898 in Providence, Rhode Island. At that time, its founders approved a constitution and elected officers and an executive committee. Francis Colwell was its first president.

The Rhode Island Bar Association is a unified bar association consisting of attorney members licensed to practice in Rhode Island. The association received nonprofit status in 1966. Its objectives are to uphold and defend the laws and Constitution of the United States, to defend the laws of Constitution of Rhode Island; to maintain representative, democratic government; to advance the science of jurisprudence; to promote the administration of justice; to uphold the honor and dignity of the process of law; to apply its knowledge and experience in the field of the law to the promotion of the public good; to encourage and cultivate social intercourse among the members of the Rhode Island Bar; and to cooperate with the American Bar Association, other national, regional and state bar associations and the local bar associations in the State of Rhode Island.

== Activities ==
In fulfilling its stated purposes, the association programs and activities are designed to serve the needs and interests of its membership, the public, and the administration of justice. Standing and special committees direct much of the programming. The association publishes the Rhode Island Bar Journal, a bi-monthly magazine. Articles on current legal issues and news about the association are in the journal and are also available on the website.

The association provides lawyer referrals for the general public by phone or through its website. The association's website also includes a member directory, educational resources, and Fastcase, an online law library. The association also offers continuing legal education. Through its charitable arm, the Rhode Island Bar Foundation, it provides access to the Interest on Lawyers' Trust Accounts (IOLTA) and the Law School Scholarship Program.

== Membership ==
All attorneys licensed to practice in the state belong to the Rhode Island Bar Association after passing the bar examination. As of 2012, the bar exam in Rhode Island tests knowledge of the common law through the Multistate Bar Exam and Multistate Essay Exam, and the exam tests Rhode Island law on the state essay portion. The exam also includes a practical component, the Multistate Performance Test. Applicants must also pass the MPRE ethics exam, pass a background check, and pay all necessary fees. Members are sworn in during a formal in-person ceremony held in the Rhode Island Supreme Court courtroom.

Membership categories include regular, associate, honorary, inactive, in-house counsel, law student, active military, and retired. The association has over 6,000 members.

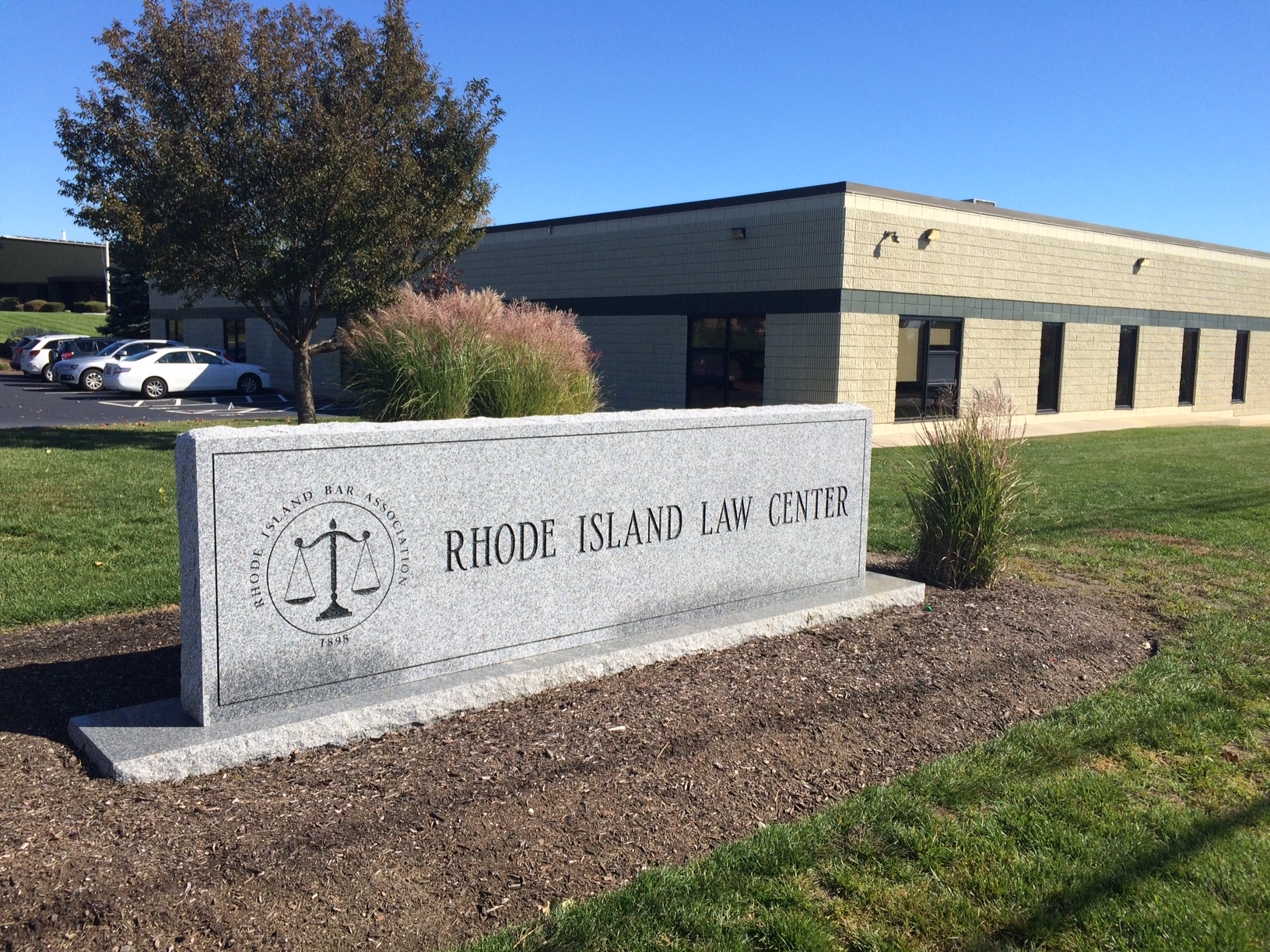
Rhode Island Bar Association building

== Governance and structure ==
The Rhode Island Bar Association is governed by three officers of the bar, an elected house of delegates, and an executive committee. Its officers include a president, president-elect, treasurer, and secretary. The association holds an annual meeting in June. The bar's governance and bylaws may be accessed on the association's website.

The 2026–2027 Rhode Island Bar Association officers are as follows:

- Dana M. Horton, president
- Holly R. Rao, president-elect
- Kathleen Wyllie, treasurer
- Eric D. Correira, secretary

The Rhode Island Bar Association is headquartered at the Rhode Island Law Center at 41 Sharpe Drive in Cranston, Rhode Island.

== See also ==
- Rhode Island Supreme Court
