= Thomas J. Rossi =

Rhode Island House of Representatives member from 1985 to 1993

Member of the Rhode Island House of Representatives from the 6th district
- In office January 3, 1985 – January 3, 1993
- Preceded by: Dominick J. Ruggerio
- Succeeded by: John J. DeSimone

Personal details
- Party: Democratic (1988-present)
- Other political affiliations: Independent (before 1987); Democratic (1987-1989); Republican (1987-1988)

Thomas J. Rossi is an American politician who served as a member of the Rhode Island House of Representatives representing North Providence in the 6th House of Representatives district between 1985 and 1993.

Rossi was succeeded in the House in 1993, by John J. DeSimone, following DeSimone defeating Rossi in the 1992 Democratic primary elections.

Rossi served as an independent in his first term, a Democrat in his second term, a Republican in his third term, and switched back to a Democrat some time before the election for his fourth term. It is unknown why Rossi changed his political party this many times.

Rossi served as the chief political strategist and a campaign manager for Providence Mayor Buddy Cianci throughout the 90's and early 2000's. During that time, he also served as the Chief of Staff of North Providence Mayor Dick Fossa. Rossi currently serves as the chief campaign strategist of Lincoln Town Administrator Philip Gould.

Rossi is a Defendant in a 2022 lawsuit in Rhode Island Superior Court, stemming from a complaint of “the destruction and theft of personal property and the prevention of claims of compensation by use of blackmail, deceptions and retaliation.” he is alleged to have committed against members of the Lincoln Community Garden.
