= Frank Ciccone =

American politician

Majority Leader of the Rhode Island Senate
- Incumbent
- Assumed office April 29, 2025
- Preceded by: Valarie Lawson

Member of the Rhode Island Senate from the 7th district
- Incumbent
- Assumed office January 2005
- Preceded by: John Celona

Member of the Rhode Island Senate from the 3rd district
- In office January 2003 – January 2005
- Preceded by: Rhoda Perry
- Succeeded by: Rhoda Perry

Personal details
- Born: October 10, 1947 (age 79) Providence, Rhode Island, U.S.
- Party: Democratic
- Education: Bryant University (BA)
- Website: Campaign website

Frank A. Ciccone III (born October 10, 1947, in Providence, Rhode Island) is an American politician and a Democratic member of the Rhode Island Senate representing District 7 since January 2005. Ciccone served consecutively from January 2003 until January 2005 in the District 3 seat. He was elected as majority leader in April 2025.

== Education ==
Ciccone graduated Hope High School. He also attended Bryant University.

== Elections ==
- 2012 Ciccone was unopposed for the September 11, 2012 Democratic Primary, winning with 1,315 votes; returning former state Senator Catherine Graziano ran as an Independent, setting up their fourth contest. Ciccone won the November 6, 2012 General election with 5,049 votes (72.7%) against former Senator Graziano.
- 2002 With District 3 incumbent Democratic Senator Rhoda Perry redistricted to District 1, Ciccone was unopposed for the September 10, 2002 Democratic Primary, winning with 1,925 votes, and won the November 5, 2002 General election with 3,633 votes (86.2%) against Republican nominee Brian Mayben, who had run for a House seat in 1996 and 1998.
- 2004 Switching to run in District 7, and with Senator John Celona retiring, Ciccone was challenged in the three-way September 14, 2004 Democratic Primary, winning with 1,667 votes (50.2%), and won the November 2, 2004 General election with 6,758 votes (72.2%) against Republican nominee Philip Stone.
- 2006 Ciccone was challenged in the September 12, 2006 Democratic Primary, but won with 2,213 votes (60.1%) against former state Senator Catherine Graziano, and won the November 7, 2006 General election with 6,980 votes (81.5%) against Green candidate Scott Hacker.
- 2008 In a rematch of their 2006 primary, Ciccone was again challenged by former state Senator Graziano in the September 9, 2008 Democratic Primary, and won with 1,114 votes (51.8%); Ciccone won the November 4, 2008 General election with 7,401 votes (77.2%) against Independent candidate Gregary Wright.
- 2010 Ciccone was unopposed for the September 23, 2010 Democratic Primary, winning with 3,114 votes; former state Senator Graziano ran as an independent, setting up their third contest. Ciccone won the November 2, 2010 General election with 4,538 votes (59.8%) against Senator Graziano.

Utah State Senate
Preceded by Valarie Lawson	Majority Leader of the Rhode Island Senate; 2025–present	Incumbent
