= Master of Arts in Special Education =

The Master of Arts in Special Education is a postgraduate academic master's degree awarded by universities in many countries. It is designed to develop the capabilities and resources of teachers of children who require special education, such as students with an autism spectrum disorder.

== Curriculum structure ==
The Master of Arts in Special Education is a two-year master degree but, depending on the program, some may be completed in as little as 18 months.

Topics of study may include:

- Applied behavior analysis
- Autism therapies
- Communication and Social Skills
- Developmental disability
- Early childhood intervention
- Evidence-based practice
- Individualized Education Program
- Positive behavior support
- Positive Discipline
- Transition Planning

== Institutions with MA Special Education degree programs ==
There are a few universities that teach this course of study, and the number is continuing to grow. Here is a list of the institutions that have Masters of Arts in Special Education Degree Program:

- Ball State University
- University of Rhode Island
- University of St. Thomas (Minnesota)
- San Francisco State University
- Lancaster Bible College

== See also ==
- List of master's degrees
- Master of Education
