= Thomas Paolino =

American politician from Rhode Island

Thomas J. Paolino

Member of the Rhode Island Senate from the 17th district
- Incumbent
- Assumed office January 2017
- Preceded by: Edward J. O'Neill

Personal details
- Party: Republican
- Education: Dean College

Thomas J. Paolino is a member of the Rhode Island State Senate representing the 17th District (Lincoln, North Providence, North Smithfield). Paolino was first elected in 2016 following the retirement of Edward O'Neill. He ran for re-election in November 2026, but lost his seat to Democrat Nelly Burdette; his term ends in January 2027.

== Rhode Island State Senate and Political Career ==
Paolino has served five terms in the Rhode Island State Senate and was most recently reelected in November 2024. In November 2022 he beat independent and former State Senator and State Representative Jack Lyle, Jr., and progressive Democrat activist Cameron Deutsch by nearly 2,200 votes. In 2021, Paolino ran as the Republican candidate in a special election for Lincoln Town Administrator to fill a vacancy caused by the departure of T. Joseph Almond who resigned to take a job with the McKee administration. Paolino placed a distant second in a six-way race to independent and Lincoln Police Captain Philip Gould. Gould garnered 63% of the vote.

The Rhode Island Board of Elections conducted a review of Senator Paolino’s campaign finance reports from January 1, 2021, to March 31, 2022. The review found a number of campaign finance violations, including ten unreported campaign expenditures totaling to $1,369.37 and $10,000.00 in an unreported loan repayment. Additionally, account certifications were not submitted for six required campaign finance reports filed in 2021. Paolino admitted wrongdoing and acknowledged that he violated campaign finance laws, and agreed to pay a $2,500.00 fine from personal funds.

== Electoral history ==
2026 Rhode Island State Senate election

2026 Rhode Island State Senate District 17 General Election
Party	Candidate	Votes	%
Democratic	Nelly Burdette	4,851	43.47%
Republican	Thomas Paolino (incumbent)	4,335	38.85%
Independent	Jina N. Petrarca	1,447	12.97%
Independent	John Douglas Barr II	520	4.66%
Write-in		6	0.05%
Total votes		11,159	100.00%

2022 Rhode Island elections

2022 Rhode Island State Senate District 17 Primary
Party	Candidate	Votes	%
Republican	Thomas Paolino (incumbent)	667	100
Total votes		667	100

2022 Rhode Island State Senate District 17 General Election
Party	Candidate	Votes	%
Republican	Thomas Paolino (incumbent)	5,314	46.8
Independent	John W. Lyle, Jr.	3,178	28.0
Democratic	Cameron Joseph Deutsch	2,852	25.1
Total votes		11,355	100

2021 Lincoln Town Administrator special election

2021 Lincoln Town Administrator Special Election
Party	Candidate	Votes	%
Independent	Philip G. Gould	2,712	63.38
Republican	Thomas Paolino	808	18.88
Democratic	John Barr, II	445	10.40
Independent	John Picozzi	171	4.00
Independent	John J. Cullen	121	2.83
Independent	James B. Spooner	19	0.44
Total votes		4,279	100

2020 Rhode Island elections

2020 Rhode Island State Senate District 17 General Election
Party	Candidate	Votes	%
Republican	Thomas Paolino (incumbent)	9,460	59.1
Democratic	John Douglas Barr, II	6,512	40.7
Total votes		15,998	100

2018 Rhode Island elections

2018 Rhode Island State Senate District 17 Primary
Party	Candidate	Votes	%
Republican	Thomas Paolino (incumbent)	944	100
Total votes		944	100

2018 Rhode Island State Senate District 17 General Election
Party	Candidate	Votes	%
Republican	Thomas Paolino (incumbent)	5,998	50.5
Democratic	Dennis Lavallee	5,860	49.3
Total votes		11,877	100

2016 Rhode Island Elections

2016 Rhode Island State Senate District 17 General Election
Party	Candidate	Votes	%
Republican	Thomas Paolino	7,224	50.9
Democratic	Jina N. Petrarca-Karampetsos	6,942	48.9
Total votes		14,201	100
