= They Walk Among Us =

One-act play by Nicholas O'Neill

They Walk Among Us is a one-act play written by Nicholas O'Neill, the youngest victim of the Station nightclub fire, a 2003 blaze that claimed the lives of 100 people in West Warwick, Rhode Island. It is also the name of a film based on the play which was released in 2005.

The play deals with issues of grief and loss, as well as the search for meaning in the human existence, and features characters who are "guardian angels," all of whom were apparently died in their teenage years. One of these characters, Cyrus, is believed by O'Neill's family to have been based on himself. For these reasons, friends and family from his local community have suggested that the play is prophetic. The documentary film 41, created by Christian de Rezendes and Nicholas's brother Christian O'Neill, is in part based on this thesis.

== Synopsis ==
The play follows Adam Tyler, a young man in New York City who is struggling to come to terms with his homosexuality, which he feels is sinful. In alternating scenes, the play also follows the story of three guardian angels who have been assigned to watch over him.

In Scene One, Adam Tyler visits a streetcorner psychic named Mama Marie, who suggests to the disbelieving Adam that he seek the guidance of angels.

In Scene Two, three actual angel characters arrive in New York with "mission objectives" given to them, it is implied, by God or Jesus. These angels are Levi, the leader, who is an ancient spirit and extremely orderly; Grace, an empathic and overachieving young woman; and Cyrus, a wisecracking rebel.

Scene Three follows Cyrus as he chats with Grace while saving Adam Tyler's life during a car accident.

Scene Four, the play's shortest scene, follows Adam Tyler as he arrives home from the car crash and calls Mama Marie to apologize for exploding at her earlier. At the end of the scene we see that he is leaving the house with a pistol.

Scene Five takes place in a diner, where the three angels (and a fourth, a new initiate named Michaiah), discuss the trials and tribulations of the angelic life.

Scene Six takes the angels to the scene of a homophobic hate rally, where Adam Tyler has been severely beaten. Cyrus, enraged, reveals himself to the humans and lectures them on God's unconditional love for all humans, regardless of sex, age, race, religion, or sexual orientation. Grace heals Adam, who surprises everyone by firing his gun at the preacher leading the hate rally. Levi leaps in the way and takes the bullet, which does not harm him.

Scene Seven follows Adam to a beach, where he attempts to pray but finds he is no longer sure he believes in God. At the moment of his greatest despair, the angels appear to him and give him a message of hope, which they tell him is his to "deliver to the world."

Scene Eight takes Adam back to Mama Marie, who reveals to him the full extent of her powers by physically describing the angels who appeared to him at the beach. The angels, invisible to the humans, decide their work is done, and Levi tells Cyrus that his actions at the hate rally and the beach have finally helped to prove himself worthy of being an angel. They go off to heaven, still bickering along the way.

== History ==
O'Neill finished the play at either age 16 or shortly after his 17th birthday of January 28, 2002, close to a year before the Station fire. Although he was an actor and singer-songwriter, They Walk Among Us marked his only attempt at playwriting.

After the fire, members of his family remembered the play but were unable to locate any copies of it until one of his friends, Emily Kunkel, produced one after cleaning out her closet. Upon re-reading it, his family (as they describe in the documentary 41) were surprised to note that the character of Cyrus, one of the angels who had died at an early age, seemed to be based on Nicholas himself. The play's message is that although tragedies occur and life is full of trials, it is crucial that people never lose hope in themselves, in God's love, or in the possibility of a higher purpose behind human existence.

The first two-stage incarnations of the play - a staged reading performed in June 2003 and a full production in February 2004, the one year anniversary of the fire - and the feature film version were all directed by Nicholas's brother, Christian O'Neill. In 2005, the film version received the award for Best Screenplay at the Black Point International Film Festival in Geneva, Wisconsin.

In 2008, a New York City production was developed by Rene Benoit for his company My Own Delirium. Christian O'Neill worked on the production as an advisor and assistant director. This new version was directed and choreographed by Merete Muenter, who inserted dance pieces between each of the scenes. The production was picked up for the Midtown International Theater Festival, and played there in August 2008.
