= John DeSimone =

American politician (born 1960)

Majority Leader of the Rhode Island House of Representatives
- In office March 2014 – January 3, 2017
- Preceded by: Nicholas Mattiello
- Succeeded by: Joe Shekarchi

Member of the Rhode Island House of Representatives from the 5th district
- In office January 3, 2003 – January 3, 2017
- Preceded by: Gordon D. Fox
- Succeeded by: Marcia Ranglin-Vassell

Member of the Rhode Island House of Representatives from the 6th district
- In office January 3, 1993 – January 3, 2003
- Preceded by: Thomas J. Rossi
- Succeeded by: Peter N. Wasylyk

Personal details
- Born: November 26, 1960 (age 65) Providence, Rhode Island, U.S.
- Party: Democratic
- Children: Anthony DeSimone
- Education: Providence College; Suffolk University Law School
- Profession: Attorney

John J. DeSimone (born November 26, 1960, in Providence, Rhode Island) is an American politician, a former Democratic member of the Rhode Island House of Representatives who represented House District 6 from January 1993 until January 2003 and District 5 from January 2003 to January 2017. DeSimone was narrowly defeated in the 2016 Democratic primary by progressive candidate Marcia Ranglin-Vassell, ending his 24 year tenure in the General Assembly.

== Education ==
DeSimone earned his BA from Providence College and his JD from Suffolk University Law School.

== Elections ==
- 1992 DeSimone won the September 15, 1992, Democratic Primary against incumbent Representative Thomas J. Rossi, and was unopposed for the November 3, 1992, General election, winning with 2,872 votes.
- 1994 DeSimone was unopposed for the September 13, 1994, Democratic Primary and won the November 8, 1994, General election with 2,600 votes (72.6%) against Republican nominee John Walsh.
- 1996 DeSimone and returning 1994 Republican challenged John Walsh were both unopposed for their September 10, 1996, primaries, setting up a rematch; DeSimone won the three-way November 5, 1996, General election with 2,527 votes (68.8%) against Independent candidate Joseph Casoli and Walsh.
- 1998 DeSimone was unopposed for both the September 15, 1998, Democratic Primary, winning with 609 votes and the November 3, 1998, General election, winning with 2,299 votes.
- 2000 DeSimone was unopposed for both the September 12, 2000, Democratic Primary, winning with 786 votes and the November 7, 2000, General election, winning with 2,435 votes.
- 2002 Redistricted to District 5, and with incumbent Representative Gordon D. Fox redistricted to District 4, DeSimone was unopposed for the September 10, 2002, Democratic Primary, winning with 1,548 votes and won the November 5, 2002, General election with 2,692 votes (82.4%) against Republican nominee Karl Poirier.
- 2004 DeSimone was unopposed for the September 14, 2004, Democratic Primary, winning with 278 votes and won the November 2, 2004, General election with 3,129 votes (78.0%) against Republican nominee Ramiro Fernandez.
- 2006 DeSimone was challenged in the September 12, 2006, Democratic Primary, winning with 1,209 votes (79.7%); returning 2004 Republican challenger Ramiro Fernandez was unopposed for his primary, setting up a rematch; DeSimone won the November 7, 2006, General election with 2,934 votes (83.3%) against Fernandez.
- 2008 DeSimone was challenged in the September 9, 2008, Democratic Primary, winning with 410 votes (70.2%) and was unopposed for the November 4, 2008, General election, winning with 3,752 votes.
- 2010 DeSimone was challenged in the September 23, 2010, Democratic Primary, winning with 1,339 votes (72.7%) and won the November 2, 2010, General election with 2,298 votes (75.7%) against Republican nominee Mark Garofalo.
- 2012 DeSimone was unopposed for the September 11, 2012, Democratic Primary, winning with 625 votes and won the November 6, 2012, General election with 2,615 votes (74.3%) against Republican nominee Daniel Grzych.
- 2014 On March 25, 2014, DeSimone was elected Majority Leader of the Rhode Island House of Representatives; succeeding Majority Leader Nicolas A. Mattiello, who became Speaker of the House. Rep. Mattiello was elected Speaker, when Speaker Gordon D. Fox was forced to resign upon becoming the subject of a Federal Wire Fraud, Bribery and Failure to File a Tax Return investigation, and law enforcement raids on his home and the Speaker's office. (Fox pled Guilty to the charges in March 2015)]
- 2016 In August, Rhode Island Progressive Democrats filed a complaint against Rep. DeSimone with the Rhode Island Ethics Commission; based on him not listing delinquent state and local property tax debts and tax liens on his financial disclosure forms. R.I. Progressives endorsed DeSimone’s primary opponent, Marcia Ranglin-Vassell in the September Primary. Rep. DeSimone had earlier said that his allowing property tax obligations to become delinquent and then paying them before a "tax sale" on the property, was a method of financial management which he used. He lost the Primary on September 13, 2016, with 661 votes to Ranglin-Vassell's 682. He then ran a write-in campaign for the General election on November 8, 2016, but lost to Ranglin-Vassell.
