= William Walaska =

American politician (1945–2017)

William A. Walaska

Member of the Rhode Island Senate from the 30th district
- In office January 2003 – January 2017
- Succeeded by: Jeanine Calkin

Member of the Rhode Island Senate from the 17th and 20th district
- In office January 1995 – January 2003

Personal details
- Born: September 16, 1945 Providence, Rhode Island, U.S.
- Died: April 3, 2017 (aged 71)
- Party: Democratic
- Education: Williams College; Dartmouth College; Providence College (BA, MBA)

William A. Walaska (September 16, 1945 – April 3, 2017) was an American Democratic politician and a member of the Rhode Island Senate who represented District 30 from 2003 to 2017. Walaska served consecutively from January 1995 until January 2003 in the District 17 seat.

== Education ==
Walaska attended Williams College and Dartmouth College, and earned his BA in economics and his MBA from Providence College.

== Elections ==
- 2012 Walaska was unopposed for the September 11, 2012, Democratic Primary, winning with 882 votes, and won the three-way November 6, 2012, General election with 7,585 votes (61.0%) against Republican nominee Keith Burkitt and Independent candidate Arthur Groh.
- 1994 When District 17 incumbent Senator Thomas Lynch left the Legislature and left the seat open, Walaska won the September 13, 1994, Democratic Primary and won the November 8, 1994, General election with 4,424 votes (57.7%) against Republican nominee Steven Archer.
- 1996 Walaska and returning 1994 Republican opponent Steven Archer were both unopposed for their September 10, 1996, primaries, setting up a rematch; Walaska won the November 5, 1996, General election with 5,353 votes (68.9%) against Archer.
- 1998 Walaska was unopposed for the September 15, 1998, Democratic Primary, winning with 1,475 votes, and won the November 3, 1998, General election with 4,941 votes (73.4%) against Republican nominee Raymond McKay.
- 2000 Walaska was unopposed for both the September 12, 2000, Democratic Primary, winning with 1,704 votes, and the November 7, 2000, General election, winning with 6,373 votes.
- 2002 Redistricted to District 30, and with incumbent Democratic Senator Paul Kelly retiring and leaving the seat open, Walaska was unopposed for both the September 10, 2002, Democratic Primary, winning with 1,932 votes, and the November 5, 2002, General election, winning with 7,331 votes.
- 2004 Walaska was unopposed for the September 14, 2004, Democratic Primary, winning with 512 votes, and won the November 2, 2004, General election with 7,758 votes (69.5%) against Republican nominee Roland Denomme.
- 2006 Walaska was unopposed for both the September 12, 2006, Democratic Primary, winning with 1,483 votes, and the November 7, 2006, General election, winning with 8,916 votes.
- 2008 Walaska was unopposed for both the September 9, 2008, Democratic Primary, winning with 1,013 votes, and the November 4, 2008, General election, winning with 9,256 votes.
- 2010 Walaska was unopposed for the September 23, 2010, Democratic Primary, winning with 1,306 votes, and won the November 2, 2010, General election with 5,545 votes (57.3%) against Republican nominee Armand Lusi.
- 2016 Walaska was defeated by Jeanine Calkin in the September 13, 2016, Democratic Primary by a 75-vote margin, ending his 22-year career in the Rhode Island Senate

== Death ==
Walaska died on April 3, 2017, of cancer.
