= Edward J. O'Neill (Rhode Island politician) =

Independent member of the Rhode Island Senate

Member of the Rhode Island Senate from the 17th district
- In office 2008–2017
- Preceded by: Joseph A. Montalbano
- Succeeded by: Thomas Paolino

Personal details
- Born: June 11, 1946 (age 80)
- Party: Independent, Republican
- Education: Bryant University (BS)

Edward J. O'Neill is an American politician from Rhode Island who represented the 17th District (Lincoln, North Providence, and Pawtucket) in the Rhode Island Senate from 2009 to 2017.

== Education and career ==
O'Neill was raised in Pawtucket, Rhode Island where he attended St. Edwards School, Slater Junior High and Pawtucket West (Shea) High School, later earning his B.S. Degree in Business Administration from Bryant University. He retired as a Senior Manager in supply and procurement and was employed by Texas Instruments for 35 years. He was president of the Lincoln Taxpayers Association before starting his political career.

== Political career ==
O'Neill won an unlikely victory by beating Democratic Senate President Joe Montalbano by a 54.3% to 45.7% margin on November 4, 2008. O'Neill ran an aggressive campaign emphasized on ending political corruption and decreasing taxes and spending.

On November 2, 2010 O'Neill beat Democratic opponent Linda Butera-Noble by a 54.5% to 45.5% margin.

On November 6, 2012 O'Neill beat Democratic opponent John Cullen and Independent Derek Meiklejohn. The results were O'Neill 57.3%, Cullen 36.1%, and Meiklejohn 6.4%.

In 2016 O'Neill, who had long identified as an Independent, re-registered as a Republican in an effort to serve as a delegate at the 2016 Republican National Convention.

=== Voting Record and Views ===
As a state senator, O'Neill sponsored and co-sponsored a variety of bills including Camp Meehan Eminent Domain Bill (S685), 20% Health Insurance Co-Pay for municipal employees (S2478), and his Autism Spectrum Disorder Bill, which was signed into law in July 2011. It made Rhode Island the 26th state with such a law. In an award ceremony at the Radisson Hotel in Warwick on Oct. 28, 2011, O’Neill was honored with the RIRA Legislative Award for his sponsorship of his Autism Spectrum Disorder Bill, which extends insurance coverage for children with autism.

While in office, O'Neill voted against two bills that would have expanded the state's policies towards same-sex civil unions and same-sex marriage. In 2013, O'Neill called on his fellow senators to vote against S38, which legalized same-sex marriage in the state, urging them to "vote their conscience[s]” and follow their own “moral compass[es].”

in 2016 O'Neill was vocally critical of the Democratic domination of Rhode Island politics, expressing his belief that the current system would reach the same outcomes regardless of Republican opposition. O'Neill cited this frustration as rationale for his increased affiliation with the Republican Party.
