= Dominick J. Ruggerio =

American politician (1948–2025)

Dominick Ruggerio

3rd President of the Rhode Island Senate
- In office March 24, 2017 – April 21, 2025
- Preceded by: M. Teresa Paiva-Weed
- Succeeded by: Valarie Lawson

Majority Leader of the Rhode Island Senate
- In office January 6, 2009 – March 23, 2017
- Preceded by: Daniel Connors
- Succeeded by: Michael McCaffrey

Member of the Rhode Island Senate from the 4th district
- In office January 3, 2005 – April 21, 2025
- Preceded by: Maryellen Goodwin
- Succeeded by: Stefano Famiglietti
- In office January 3, 1985 – January 3, 2003
- Preceded by: Rocco Quattrocchi
- Succeeded by: Maryellen Goodwin

Member of the Rhode Island Senate from the 6th district
- In office January 3, 2003 – January 3, 2005
- Preceded by: V. Susan Sosnowski
- Succeeded by: Harold Metts

Member of the Rhode Island House of Representatives from the 6th district
- In office January 3, 1981 – January 3, 1985
- Preceded by: Albert J. Lepore
- Succeeded by: Thomas J. Rossi

Personal details
- Born: December 19, 1948 Providence, Rhode Island, U.S.
- Died: April 21, 2025 (aged 76) North Providence, Rhode Island, U.S.
- Party: Democratic
- Children: 2
- Education: Bryant University; Providence College (BS)

Dominick J. Ruggerio (December 19, 1948 – April 21, 2025) was an American politician who was a Democratic member and president of the Rhode Island Senate, representing the 4th District from 1985. A member of the Senate since 1985, he was previously elected Majority Leader on November 10, 2010, having won election to his 14th term in the Senate on November 2, 2010. Ruggerio served as President of the Senate from 2017 until his death in 2025.

== Background ==
Dominick Ruggerio graduated from La Salle Academy in 1966. Ruggerio then attended Bryant College and earned his Bachelor of Science degree in 1974 from Providence College. He was a retired administrator for the New England Laborers Labor Management Coop Trust, as well as a member of the board of directors for the Wanskuck Library, the Sons of Italy, Loggia Vittoria, and the DaVinci Center Development Committee.

== Rhode Island Senate ==
As Senate President, Ruggerio served as an ex officio member of all standing Senate committees.

Ruggerio served as Majority Whip from 2003 through 2010. He had previously served as a member and as Vice Chairman of the Senate Labor Committee, Chairman of the Senate Subcommittee on Labor and Transportation, and as a member of the Senate Finance Committee, the Senate Rules Committee, the Senate Labor Committee, and the Joint Committee on Accounts and Claims. He also previously served as Deputy Majority Leader.

Ruggerio was the “Dean” of the Rhode Island General Assembly, meaning he had served longer than any other member of the RI Senate or House of Representatives.

Prior to his tenure in the Senate, Ruggerio was a member of the Rhode Island House of Representatives from 1981 through 1984 and was a member of the House Labor Committee and House Corporations Committee.

He served as a policy adviser for the Office of the Lieutenant Governor from 1977 through 1981.

In January 2013, Ruggerio was one of five senators to file legislation seeking a voter referendum to define marriage as being between solely a man and a woman in the Rhode Island Constitution.

Ruggerio was briefly redistricted to Senate District 6 in 2002 before being redistricted back in 2004.

== Personal life ==
Ruggerio resided in North Providence and was the father of two children, Charles and Amanda.

== Final years and death ==
In April 2024, after concerns were raised about extended absences from the Senate, Ruggerio announced that he was undergoing treatment for cancer. He won another term in the Rhode Island Senate in the November 2024 election despite ongoing health challenges.

During the 2024 and 2025 legislative sessions, Ruggerio's illness increasingly limited his public appearances and participation in Senate business. He missed substantial portions of both sessions because of cancer treatments, hospitalizations, and related health complications.

In March 2025, Ruggerio was hospitalized with pneumonia and spent time in rehabilitation.

On April 18, 2025, Ruggerio, was hospitalized again at Our Lady of Fatima Hospital in North Providence after suffering complications related to his cancer treatment. Three days later, on April 21, he died at the age of 76.

== Arrests and legal issues ==
In November 1989, Ruggerio was charged with maliciously damaging the car of a Lincoln businessman, Nandy M. Sarda, in September of the same year. In February 1990, he was ordered to pay restitution and to stay away from Sarda.

Ruggerio was arrested in September 1990 for shoplifting condoms from a CVS drug store in Cranston, Rhode Island. He was not prosecuted.

In 2012, Ruggerio was arrested in Barrington, Rhode Island, and charged with DUI and refusal to submit to a breathalyzer. He later pleaded guilty to refusing the test, but the DUI charge was dismissed.

Political offices
Preceded by Daniel Connors	Majority Leader of the Rhode Island Senate; 2009–2017	Succeeded by Michael McCaffrey
Preceded by M. Teresa Paiva-Weed	President of the Rhode Island Senate; 2017–2025	Succeeded by Valarie Lawson
