= President of the Rhode Island Senate =

Position in the Rhode Island Senate

President of the Senate of Rhode Island
- Seal of Rhode Island
- Incumbent; Valarie Lawson since April 29, 2025
- Style: The Honorable
- Term length: Two years, renewable
- Inaugural holder: Joseph A. Montalbano, 2003
- Formation: Constitution of Rhode Island

The President of the Rhode Island Senate is the presiding officer of the Rhode Island Senate. Unlike most other states, the lieutenant governor of Rhode Island does not preside over the state senate. Instead, the lieutenant governor has roles in "emergency preparedness and homeland security".

The role of president was established in 2003. Rhode Island Constitution provides that the lieutenant governor would no longer preside over the Senate in 2003, and power would be transferred to a president elected by senators. The first elected president was Joseph A. Montalbano, a Democrat from North Providence.

== List ==
#	Name	Party	Term
1	Joseph A. Montalbano	Democratic	2003 – January 5, 2009
2	M. Teresa Paiva-Weed	Democratic	January 6, 2009 – March 24, 2017
3	Dominick J. Ruggerio	Democratic	March 24, 2017 – April 21, 2025
4	Valarie Lawson	Democratic	April 29, 2025 – present
