= Brett Smiley (politician) =

American politician (born 1979)

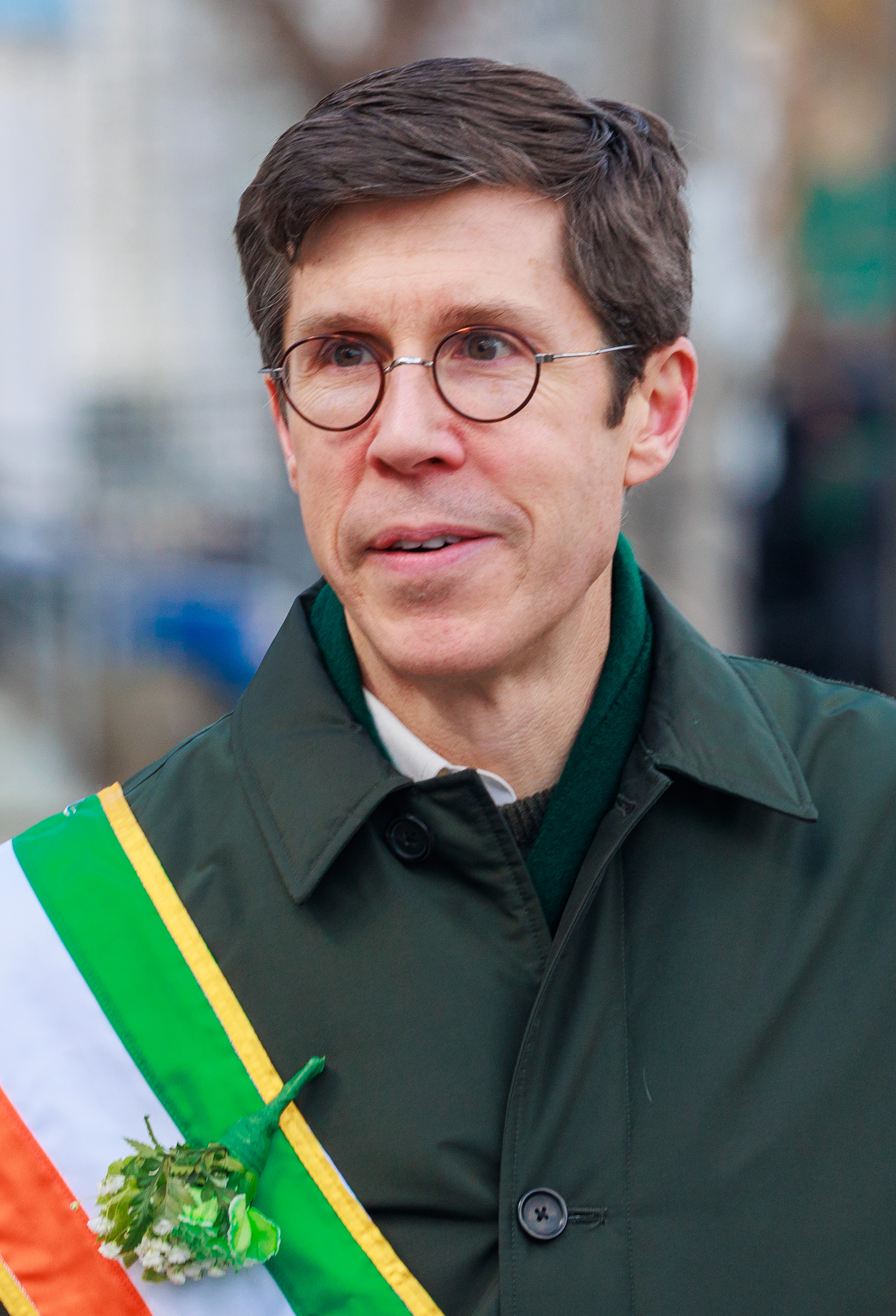
- Smiley in 2025

39th Mayor of Providence
- Incumbent
- Assumed office January 2, 2023
- Preceded by: Jorge Elorza

Director of the Rhode Island Department of Administration
- In office December 2019 – February 2021
- Governor: Gina Raimondo
- Preceded by: Michael DiBiase
- Succeeded by: James Thorsen

Personal details
- Born: Brett Peter Smiley; May 7, 1979 (age 47)
- Party: Democratic
- Spouse: Jim DeRentis
- Education: DePaul University (BS, MBA)

Brett Peter Smiley (born May 7, 1979) is an American politician from Rhode Island. A member of the Democratic Party, he has been the incumbent mayor of Providence, Rhode Island since January 2, 2023.

== Early life and career ==
Smiley grew up outside of Chicago, Illinois. He attended DePaul University, earning a bachelor's degree in finance and a Master of Business Administration. In 2004, he was campaign manager for congressional candidate Melissa Bean, and ran her district office until late 2005. He moved to Rhode Island to work for Lieutenant Governor Charlie Fogarty's campaign in the 2006 Rhode Island gubernatorial election. After the election, Smiley worked for David Cicilline, the mayor of Providence, and opened a political consulting firm. He was also chair of the city's Water Supply Board.

In December 2013, Smiley announced his candidacy for mayor of Providence in the 2014 election, seeking to succeed Angel Taveras, who did not run for reelection so that he could run for governor of Rhode Island. He dropped out of the mayoral race in August 2014 and endorsed Jorge Elorza, the eventual winner. Elorza named Smiley the city's chief operating officer after the election. In September 2016, he became the chief of staff to Governor Gina Raimondo. In December 2019, Raimondo named Smiley as the new head of the Rhode Island Department of Administration. He resigned in February 2021.

== Mayor of Providence ==
After his resignation, Smiley announced his candidacy for mayor of Providence in the 2022 election, seeking to succeed Jorge Elorza, who was prevented from running for a third term due to term limits. He won the Democratic primary in September 2022 with 42% of the vote, while Gonzalo Cuervo received 36% and Nirva LaFortune earned 22%. He faced no opposition in the November 8 general election and took the oath of office on January 2, 2023.

Smiley ran for reelection in 2026 and lost to democratic socialist David Morales. He is the first mayor of Providence to ever lose a primary.

== Personal life ==
Smiley's husband, Jim DeRentis, is a real estate agent.

Smiley grew up in the United Church of Christ. In 2024, he converted to Reform Judaism. Smiley's grandfather was a German-born Jewish immigrant.

Political offices
Preceded by Jorge Elorza	Mayor of Providence; 2023–present	Incumbent
