= 2026 Providence mayoral election =

Local election in Rhode Island, US

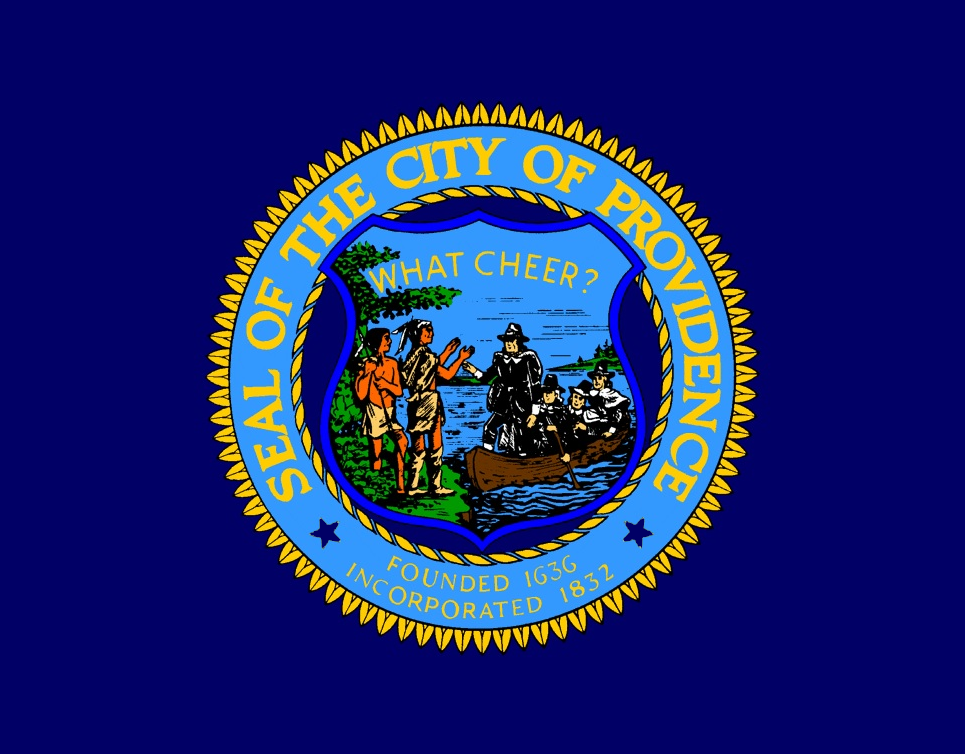
- November 3, 2026
- Turnout: 37,916

Candidate	David Morales	Dave Talan
Party	Democratic	Republican
Popular vote	30,703	6,531
Percentage	81.0%	17.2%
Mayor before election
Brett Smiley
Democratic
Elected mayor
David Morales
Democratic

The 2026 Providence mayoral election was held on November 3, 2026. Incumbent Democratic mayor Brett Smiley ran for re-election to a second term in office, but was defeated in the September 9 primary.

== Democratic primary ==
=== Candidates ===
==== Nominee ====
- David Morales, state representative from the 7th district (2021–present)

==== Eliminated in primary ====
- Brett Smiley, incumbent mayor

==== Withdrawn ====
- Michael English, paralegal

=== Endorsements ===
David Morales

U.S. senators

- Bernie Sanders, Vermont (2007–present) (Independent)

U.S. representatives

- Jamaal Bowman, former NY-16 (2021–2025)
- Ro Khanna, CA-17 (2017–present)

State legislators

- Sam Bell, state senator from the 5th district (2019–present)
- Linda Kushner, former state representative from the 4th district (1983–1993)
- Aaron Regunberg, former state representative from the 4th district (2015–2019)
- Enrique Sanchez, state representative from the 9th district (2023–present)
- Moira Walsh, former state representative from the 3rd district (2017–2021)

Local officials

- Jorge Elorza, former mayor of Providence (2015–2023)

Labor unions

- Providence Teachers Union
- Rhode Island Federation of Teachers Local 6516
- Service Employees International Union Rhode Island State Council
- UNITE HERE Local 26

Organizations

- Latino Victory Fund
- Progressive Victory
- Run for Something

Political parties

- Rhode Island Working Families Party
Brett Smiley

Executive branch officials

- Pete Buttigieg, former U.S. secretary of transportation (2021–2025)
- Gina Raimondo, former U.S. secretary of commerce (2021–2025)

State legislators

- Grace Diaz, state representative from the 11th district (2005–present)
- Ana Quezada, state senator from the 2nd district (2017–present)

Labor unions

- Rhode Island Building and Construction Trades Council

Organizations

- LGBTQ Victory Fund

Political parties

- Providence Democratic City Committee

Newspapers

- The Brown Daily Herald

=== Polling ===
Poll source	Date(s) administered	Sample size (Note: Key: A – all adults RV – registered voters LV – likely voters V – unclear)	Margin of error	David Morales	Brett Smiley	Undecided
Concord Public Opinion Partners (Note: Poll sponsored by Education Reform Now Advocacy, a group led by former mayor Jorge Elorza.)	August 19–20, 2026	310 (LV)	± 5.56%	48%	38%	13%
Concord Public Opinion Partners (Note: Poll sponsored by Education Reform Now Advocacy, a group led by former mayor Jorge Elorza.)	July 19–20, 2026	305 (LV)	± 5.65%	38%	42%	19%

=== Debate ===
2026 Providence mayoral election Democratic primary debate
No.	Date	Host	Moderator	Link	Democratic	Democratic
Key: P Participant A Absent N Not invited I Invited W Withdrawn						
Key: P Participant A Absent N Not invited I Invited W Withdrawn					David Morales	Brett Smiley
1	July 17, 2026	WPRI-TV	Alexandra Leslie; Ted Nesi; Tim White		P	P

=== Results ===
Democratic primary results
Party	Candidate	Votes	%
Democratic	David Morales	14,299	52.45
Democratic	Brett Smiley (incumbent)	12,961	47.55
Total votes		27,260	100.00

== Republican primary ==
=== Candidates ===
==== Nominee ====
- Dave Talan, former nuclear engineer

== Independents ==
=== Candidates ===
==== Declared ====
- Allen Waters, investment consultant and perennial candidate

== General election ==
=== Debates and forums ===
2026 Providence mayoral election debates and forums
No.	Date	Host	Moderator	Link	Participants				
Key: P Participant A Absent N Not invited I Invited W Withdrawn									
Key: P Participant A Absent N Not invited I Invited W Withdrawn					Michael English (D)	David Morales (D)	Brett Smiley (D)	Dave Talan (R)	Allen Waters (I)
1	April 22, 2026	Brown Votes	–		P	P	P	N	P
2	June 24, 2026	Various neighbourhood organizations (Note: Elmwood Neighborhood Association; Elmwood and & South Providence Crime Watch; Jacqueline Clements Park (JCP) Collective; People's Port Authority; Reservoir Triangle Neighborhood Association; South Elmwood Neighborhood Association; South Providence Neighborhood Association; Washington Park Neighborhood Association)	Lanre Ajakaiye		W	P	P	P	P
3	July 20, 2026	Rhode Island League of Women Voters; Providence Community Libraries	–		W	P	P	P	N
4	July 23, 2026	Rhode Island League of Women Voters; Providence Community Libraries	–		W	P	P	P	N
5	August 4, 2026	Rhode Island League of Women Voters; Providence Community Libraries	–		W	P	P	P	N
6	August 4, 2026	WPRO	Bill; Bartholomew		W	P	P	N	N

== Notes ==
Partisan clients
