= John Lombardi =

John Lombardi may refer to:

- John V. Lombardi (born 1942), American educator & administrator
- John J. Lombardi (born 1952), American politician
- Johnny Lombardi, Canadian broadcaster
