= John J. Lombardi =

American politician (born 1952)

Member of the Rhode Island House of Representatives from the 8th district
- Incumbent
- Assumed office January 2013
- Preceded by: Michael Tarro

Chief Judge of the Providence Municipal Court
- Incumbent
- Assumed office January 18, 2023
- Preceded by: Frank Caprio

Associate Judge of the Providence Municipal Court
- In office 2014–2023

35th Mayor of Providence
- Acting
- In office September 6, 2002 – January 6, 2003
- Preceded by: Buddy Cianci
- Succeeded by: David Cicilline

President of the Providence City Council
- In office 1999–2006

Member of the Providence City Council from ward 13
- In office 1984–2010

Personal details
- Born: John Joseph Lombardi; April 30, 1952 (age 74)
- Party: Democratic Party
- Education: Rhode Island College; Suffolk University Law School
- Occupation: Attorney

John Joseph Lombardi (born April 30, 1952) is an American politician, judge, and lawyer. A member of the Democratic Party from Providence, Rhode Island, he currently serves as a member of the Rhode Island House of Representatives and as chief judge of the Providence Municipal Court. Lombardi previously served as on the Providence City Council, including as council president. While council president, he also he served on an acting basis as mayor of Providence for the four months between the conviction of Buddy Cianci and the election of David Cicilline.

== Early life and education ==
John Joseph Lombardi was born April 30, 1952. Lombardi grew up in Federal Hill on DePasquale Avenue and graduated from Mount Pleasant High School in 1970. He attended Rhode Island College, earning a Bachelor of Arts in 1975. He worked as a teacher, earning a Master of Arts in Secondary Education from Rhode Island College in 1982, before turning his interests to law. He received a Juris Doctor from Suffolk University Law School in 1987.

== Providence City Council ==
In 1984, he was elected to the Providence City Council, representing Ward 13, serving for over 26 years. His district representd the neighborhoods of Federal Hill and West End.

In 1999, Lombardi was elected President of the City Council, and served until 2006. When Vincent Cianci was convicted and was forced to step down, Lombardi, as City Council President, took over.

Lombardi ran for mayor in 2010, but lost the Democratic primary election to Angel Taveras, finishing second with 29% of the vote to Taveras's 48%.

== Rhode Island State House ==
In 2012, Lombardi won a three-way race to represent the neighborhoods of Federal Hill, Manton and Olneyville in the Rhode Island House of Representatives.

Lombardi serves as Second Vice Chair of the House Special Legislation Committee as well as a member of the House Small Business Committee and the House Veterans' Affairs Committee.

In 2013, Lombardi introduced a bill calling for term limits for members of the State Legislature. In February 2020, Lombardi joined State Representative Ray Hull in introducing a bill to create a DCYF legislative oversight commission. In 2023, Lombardi introduced legislation that would ban patient brokering, with penalties and enforcement for violations. The same year, he sponsored a bill to impose mandatory training standards on police officers and police trainees in identifying, responding, and addressing incidents involving individuals with developmental disabilities. That same year, he also introduced a bill to make possession of a used catalytic converter a felony offense and to mandate recycling service providers to keep records related to catalytic converters.

Lombardi has sponsored bills that would prohibit residential landlords from inquiring about the previous incarceration of a rental applicant, and which would prohibit them from discriminating against individuals who have been released from prison. In 2024, he sponsored legislation to allow additional residents of a residential dwelling to extend the term of a rental agreement for a three-month period after the death of a lessee. He also has sponsored legislation to permit for multiple non-violent convictions to be expunged from a criminal record ten years subsequent to the completion of a sentence for the felonies.

== Municipal Court judge ==
In 2014, Lombardi began serving as an associate judge of the Providence Municipal Court. On January 18, 2022, the Providence City Council appointed Lombardi the Chief Judge of the court, with Lombardi succeeding outgoing Frank Caprio.

== Other work ==
Lombardi works as a lawyer. He was formerly the president of Federal Hill House and Zuccolo Recreation Center.

== Personal life ==
Lombardi and his wife, Denise, live in Providence.

Political offices
Preceded by Vincent Cianci	Mayor of Providence; 2002–2003	Succeeded by David Cicilline
