= Operation Plunder Dome =

Late-1990s FBI undercover investigation into corruption in Providence, Rhode Island, US

Operation Plunder Dome was an undercover investigation by the Federal Bureau of Investigation into political corruption within the government of the City of Providence, Rhode Island.

The operation first became public when the FBI executed a search warrant on Providence City Hall on April 28, 1999. The investigations that followed ultimately led to the indictment and subsequent conviction on federal criminal charges against a number of city officials including the 2002 indictment of then-Mayor Buddy Cianci.

Frank Corrente, Chief of Administration for Providence, was found guilty of extortion and bribery and sentenced to 56 months in prison. During the case, an investigative reporter for WJAR, Jim Taricani, refused to reveal who leaked a surveillance tape to him. He was convicted of criminal contempt of court on November 18, 2004 and sentenced on December 9, 2004 to six months of home confinement.
