= David Morales (politician) =

American politician in Rhode Island (born 1998)

- Morales in 2026

Mayor-elect of Providence
- Assuming office January 4, 2027
- Succeeding: Brett Smiley

Member of the Rhode Island House of Representatives from the 7th district
- Incumbent
- Assumed office January 5, 2021
- Preceded by: Daniel P. McKiernan

Personal details
- Born: September 16, 1998 (age 28) Soledad, California, U.S.
- Party: Democratic
- Other political affiliations: Democratic Socialists of America
- Education: University of California, Irvine (BA); Brown University (MPA)
- Website: Official website

David Morales (born September 16, 1998) is an American politician, activist, and former professional wrestler. He represents the 7th district in the Rhode Island House of Representatives and won the 2026 Providence mayoral election. A member of the Democratic Party, Morales took office in January 2021 with support from the Democratic Socialists of America, the Working Families Party, the Sunrise Movement, and other progressive organizations.

On September 15, 2025, Morales declared his candidacy for mayor of Providence in 2026 against the incumbent, Brett Smiley. Morales defeated Smiley in the Democratic primary on September 9, 2026, and won the November 3 general election.

== Early life ==
Morales grew up in the rural, working-class town of Soledad, California. He was raised by a single mother who often worked multiple jobs at once to support him and his younger sister, including working as gas station clerk and picking vegetables in agricultural fields. Morales has regularly cited his mother as his greatest inspiration for becoming politically involved, both praising her perseverance and wanting to change the conditions of poverty he saw her experience. Morales also considers Senator Bernie Sanders' 2016 presidential campaign along with his involvement in the Sunrise Movement and the Democratic Socialists of America inspirations for pursuing public office.

During high school, Morales did farm labor on the weekends to support his family and enrolled in college courses at night, enabling him to gain enough credits to graduate from a four-year college at 19. He received his bachelor's degree in urban studies from the University of California, Irvine. He then pursued a Master of Public Affairs at Brown University, where at 20, he became the youngest graduate in the program's history.

Between 2021 and 2025, Morales performed as a professional wrestler for Renegade Wrestling Alliance, an independent wrestling promotion, winning three championships. He wrestled under the name "The Commissioner", a heel politician character. In 2025, he stepped away from wrestling to focus on politics.

== Early career ==
Morales began his campaign against incumbent state representative Daniel P. McKiernan in December 2019. Despite not receiving the local Democratic committee's endorsement, he won a three-way primary with 49.4% of the vote. He received 96% of the vote in the general election.

== Political career ==
=== Rhode Island House of Representatives ===
In the 2021 legislative session, Morales was a member of the House Innovation, Internet and Technology Committee, and the House Municipal Government and Housing Committee. He is also a member of the National Association of Latino Elected Officials (NALEO) and the Democratic Socialists of America (DSA). During the 2021 legislative session, Morales introduced 27 bills and resolutions, on matters including healthcare, COVID relief, labor rights, immigration, and tax reform.

At 27, he is the youngest member of the Rhode Island State Legislature and the youngest Latino state lawmaker in the country.

Morales's 2026 mayoral platform states his intention to work with the Providence Police Department to connect residents with violence prevention programs, mental health resources, substance use counseling, and case management.

=== 2026 Providence mayoral election ===
On September 15, 2025, Morales declared his intention to run for mayor of Providence in 2026 against the incumbent, Brett Smiley. In the September 9 primary, Morales defeated Mayor Brett Smiley, marking the first time an incumbent Providence mayor had been defeated in a primary.

Morales was endorsed by politicians including U.S. Senator Bernie Sanders, U.S. Representative Ro Khanna, former U.S. representative Jamaal Bowman, and former state representative Linda Kushner. He was also endorsed by organizations including the Providence Teachers Union, Service Employees International Union Massachusetts, UNITE HERE Local 26, Latino Victory Fund, Progressive Victory, Run for Something, and the Working Families Party.

== Political positions ==
Morales identifies as a democratic socialist, and is a close ally of Rhode Island state senator Sam Bell.

=== Tax policy ===
Morales supports reforming Rhode Island's tax code to reduce exemptions for private universities and nonprofits, such as Brown University, and to increase state income tax rates in the top bracket. He has regularly spoken out against the state's tax code, which was changed in 2006 to cut income taxes for the highest earners from 9.99% to 5.99%. In the fall of 2020, shortly after winning his primary election, he resisted Governor Gina Raimondo's "austerity budget" alongside Reclaim RI and other legislators, which would have cut social services while preserving tax cuts for the wealthy.

During the 2021 legislative session, Morales introduced a bill to establish a surtax on the business corporation tax for publicly traded corporations whose CEO-to-median-worker pay ratio is equal to or greater than 100 to 1. Alongside Deputy House Speaker Charlene Lima, Morales co-sponsored a bill to exempt the first $10,200 of unemployment benefits from state taxes in response to Rhode Island's decision to tax unemployment.

Morales's 2026 mayoral platform states his opposition to Providence's flat property tax, laying out his intention to replace it with "a newer and fairer system that finally requires the wealthiest property owners, large developers, and our Private Universities to contribute their fair share to our city." He also advocates a vacancy tax and acquisition fee for large corporate real estate purchasing housing stock in the city, and promised to audit Providence's PILOT agreements with its large institutions.

=== Labor ===
Morales supports raising the minimum wage to $15 an hour. In May 2021, the RI House of Representatives passed a pathway to the $15 minimum wage that gradually increased the minimum wage from $11.50 to $15 by January 1, 2025. In August 2025, Morales supported a bill that would further raise the state's minimum wage to $17 by 2027.

In the 2021 legislative session, Morales introduced several bills related to labor rights. Among them was House Bill 5855, which would expand Rhode Island's whistleblower protection law by prohibiting employers from reporting employees' immigration status, extending whistleblower protections to job applicants and prospective employees, increasing damages for employers who violate the law from "actual" to "treble", and requiring that the Whistleblower Protection Law be posted in the workplace in every language the workers are known to speak. The bill passed both the House and Senate on the last day of the 2021 legislative session. In addition, Morales introduced a bill to give essential workers "hazard pay" of 133% of their regular pay during a declared public health emergency. He also introduced the Dignity at Work Act, which would require employers to take appropriate steps to prevent workplace bullying or harassment and establish a Fair Work Commission (FWC) to investigate cases of workplace bullying. Both bills were held for further study.

=== Healthcare ===
Morales is a strong supporter of a single-payer healthcare system. He introduced a bill to establish the Rhode Island Comprehensive Health Insurance Program, a Medicare-for-All program. The bill was held for further study. Morales worked with state lawmakers and co-sponsored legislation to cap out-of-pocket costs for insulin prescriptions at $40 a month; the bill unanimously passed the House and Senate. He also introduced a bill to cap out-of-pocket expenses for specialty prescription drug medication at $100 for a 30-day supply.

==== Health insurance ====
In August 2021, Morales, 14 other lawmakers, and over 150 Rhode Island residents organized a letter urging the RI Office of the Health Insurance Commissioner to reject health insurance rate hikes proposed by Blue Cross Blue Shield, the Neighborhood Health Plan of RI, UnitedHealthcare, Aetna, Cigna, and Tufts Health.

Morales believes that RIte Track, a Rhode Island statewide Medicaid program, should provide healthcare coverage to all children, regardless of their immigration status. In an interview, he said, "Right now, we have 3,000 children in the state uninsured and the vast majority are low-income or undocumented." With recent budget cuts, the growing number of uninsured people in Rhode Island, and the exclusion of undocumented children, Morales hopes to revamp the program.

==== COVID-19 ====
In 2021, Morales introduced and passed House Bill 6208, which limits how much insurance companies can charge customers for out-of-pocket costs relating to COVID-19. It also mandates that COVID-19 testing and vaccination be free for Rhode Island residents. Morales has publicly criticized Rhode Island leaders and government officials for their slow response to COVID-19, calling their behavior careless. He advocates a bill that would provide hazard pay to people working during the pandemic, including supermarket workers and restaurant servers. Morales also introduced a bill to impose a moratorium on utility shutoffs during COVID-19 or any future public health crises. Furthermore, he has advocated investing in communities of color and low-income communities that have been disproportionately affected by COVID due to preexisting social inequities, saying we cannot continue "business as usual".

=== Education ===
To further expand access to higher education, Morales introduced a bill to allow high school students who earn Rhode Island's Silver or Gold Seal of Biliteracy to earn college credit toward a minor or major at a public university or community college.

=== Policing ===
Following the New York City Police Department's use of a robot dog across Manhattan, Morales introduced a bill to ban the use of police robot dogs in Rhode Island. The bill was held for further study.

=== Environment ===
Before becoming a legislator, Morales was a member of Sunrise Movement Rhode Island. He has maintained his advocacy work while in office. In April 2021, he organized a letter with over 25 legislators to oppose Sea 3's fossil fuel expansion in the Port of Providence. During the 2021 legislative session, Morales introduced a bill to transfer the planning and administration of the interconnection of renewable energy from the electric distribution companies to the Rhode Island Infrastructure Bank. He was also the lead sponsor of a bill to establish the state's first Green Justice Zone, which would ensure that all burdened communities in the state have clean air and clean water.

== Electoral history ==
=== 2020 ===
Rhode Island House of Representatives District 7
Primary election
Party	Candidate	Votes	%
Democratic	David Morales	875	49.4
Democratic	Daniel McKiernan (incumbent)	493	27.8
Democratic	Angel Subervi	403	22.8
Total votes		1,771	100
General election
Democratic	David Morales	4,069	96
N/A	Write-in	170	4
Total votes		4,239	100

=== 2022 ===
Rhode Island House of Representatives District 7
Primary election
Party	Candidate	Votes	%
Democratic	David Morales	1,469	100
Total votes		1,469	100
General election
Democratic	David Morales	2,154	81.1
Independent	Christopher Ireland	473	17.8
N/A	Write-in	28	1.1
Total votes		2,655	100

=== 2024 ===
Rhode Island House of Representatives District 7
Primary election
Party	Candidate	Votes	%
Democratic	David Morales	497	100
Total votes		497	100
General election
Democratic	David Morales	3,757	95.7
N/A	Write-in	170	4.3
Total votes		3,927	100

== See also ==
- Rhode Island House of Representatives
- Democratic Socialists of America

Political offices
Preceded by Brett Smiley	Mayor of Providence; Taking office 2027	Elect
