= The Prince of Providence =

Book by Mike Stanton

- Author: Mike Stanton
- Language: English
- Genre: Biography
- Publication place: United States
- ISBN: 0-375-50780-9

The Prince of Providence is a non-fiction book written by Mike Stanton based on the true life of American politician Buddy Cianci.

The book was adapted by writer David Mamet into a feature film. Michael Corrente was chosen to direct, with Oliver Platt playing the role of Buddy. The production was set to begin filming in August 2008, but the movie was never released.

The book was adapted into a play by the Trinity Repertory Company and had its world premiere September 12, 2019. The script was written by George Brant, and the show was directed by Taibi Magar.
