= Joseph R. Paolino Jr. =

American lawyer

Joe Paolino
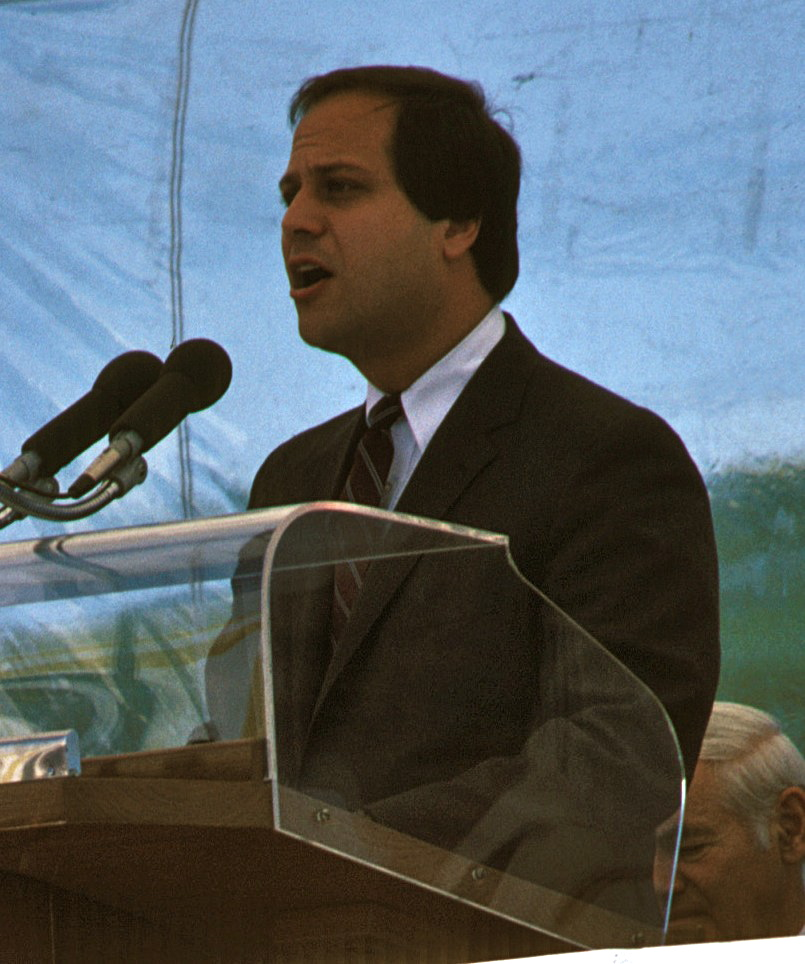

United States Ambassador to Malta
- In office July 6, 1994 – June 2, 1996
- President: Bill Clinton
- Preceded by: Sally J. Novetzke
- Succeeded by: Kathryn Proffitt

33rd Mayor of Providence
- In office April 25, 1984 – January 7, 1991
- Preceded by: Buddy Cianci
- Succeeded by: Buddy Cianci

Personal details
- Born: April 26, 1955 (age 70) Providence, Rhode Island, U.S.
- Party: Democratic
- Spouse: Lianne Andreoni
- Children: 4
- Education: Roger Williams University (BA); Harvard University (ALM)
- Website: Official website

Joseph R. Paolino Jr. (born April 26, 1955) is an American politician and diplomat who was the former 33rd mayor of Providence, Rhode Island, and US Ambassador to Malta. He was previously the Director of the Rhode Island Department of Economic Development and is a managing partner for Paolino Properties.

== Biography ==
As a student at the Harvard Extension School, he was the graduate student speaker at the commencement ceremonies in 1989. He was elected to the Providence City Council in 1978 and was re-elected in 1982. He was serving as City Council Chairman when incumbent Mayor Vincent A. "Buddy" Cianci Jr. was removed from office after pleading no contest to felony charges and given a five-year suspended sentence. With Cianci's removal from office, Paolino became acting mayor at the age of 29 and ran in the special election to succeed Cianci. He won the special election and was re-elected in 1986 and served until January 1991. In 1990, Paolino ran for Governor of Rhode Island but lost to Bruce Sundlun in the Democratic primary.

In 1994, he was appointed by President Bill Clinton as Ambassador to Malta. He served as ambassador from July 6, 1994, to June 2, 1996. He ran for the United States House of Representatives in Rhode Island's 2nd congressional district in 1996, but lost the Democratic primary to then Lieutenant Governor Robert Weygand.

He ran for mayor again in 2002 but lost to David N. Cicilline in the Democratic primaries. In 2010, he suggested that he would run again for mayor as an independent.

After withdrawing from politics, Paolino pursued interests in the real estate industry. Along with two other investors, he developed a plan to redevelop the Newport Grand slot parlor in Newport, Rhode Island, as a full-service casino with table games. Rhode Island state law, however, requires that any expansion of gaming facilities be approved by referendum both statewide and in the community where the facility is located.

More recently, he has moved to Newport to run the Jobs For Newport campaign, which advocated for the passage of a referendum question that would have allowed table games at the Newport Grand slot parlor. The referendum passed statewide but was rejected by 57 percent of Newport voters. A second ballot question contained a provision barring gaming facilities from changing locations without voter approval, which was approved both statewide and in Newport.

As of October 2019, he was registered to vote in Ward 2 in the City of Providence.

== Personal life ==
His father, Joseph R. Paolino Sr., was a prominent Rhode Island real estate dealer and developer.

He married Lianne Andreoni shortly after becoming Mayor of Providence in 1984. They have four children.

Political offices
Preceded by Buddy Cianci	Mayor of Providence; 1984–1991	Succeeded by Buddy Cianci
Diplomatic posts
Preceded by Sally J. Novetzke	United States Ambassador to Malta; 1994–1996	Succeeded by Kathryn Proffitt
