= Buddy Cianci =

American politician and radio host (1941–2016)

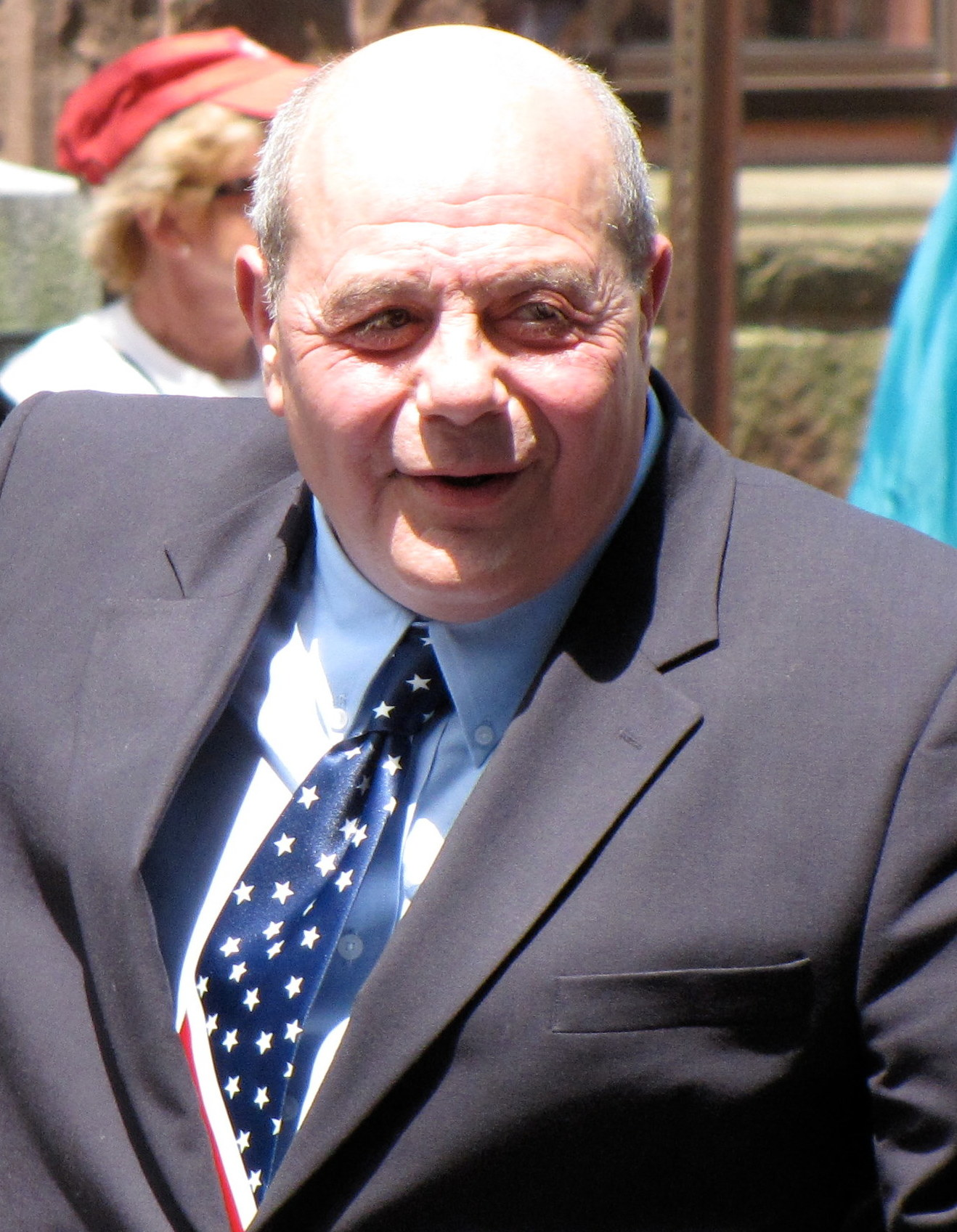
- Cianci in 2009

32nd and 34th Mayor of Providence
- In office January 7, 1991 – September 6, 2002
- Preceded by: Joseph R. Paolino Jr.
- Succeeded by: John J. Lombardi
- In office January 7, 1975 – April 25, 1984
- Preceded by: Joseph A. Doorley Jr.
- Succeeded by: Joseph R. Paolino Jr.

Personal details
- Born: Vincent Albert Cianci Jr. April 30, 1941 Cranston, Rhode Island, U.S.
- Died: January 28, 2016 (aged 74) Providence, Rhode Island, U.S.
- Party: Republican (until 1982); Independent (after 1982)
- Spouse: Sheila Bentley (m. 1973; div. 1983)
- Children: 1
- Education: Fairfield University (BA); Villanova University (MA); Marquette University (JD)

Military service
- Allegiance: United States
- Branch/service: United States Army
- Years of service: 1966–1969 (active); 1969–1972 (reserve)
- Rank: Second Lieutenant
- Unit: Army Military Police Corps

Vincent Albert "Buddy" Cianci Jr. (/siˈænsi/, see-AN-see; Italian pronunciation: [ˈtʃantʃi]; April 30, 1941 – January 28, 2016) was an American politician, attorney, radio talk show host, and political commentator who served as the mayor of Providence, Rhode Island, from 1975 to 1984 and again from 1991 to 2002. Cianci was the longest-serving mayor of Providence, having held office for over 21 years.

Cianci served two separate stints as mayor of Providence. Earlier in his career, he served as a state prosecutor in the Rhode Island Department of Attorney General. Cianci was forced to resign from office during both mayoral tenures due to felony convictions. His first administration ended in 1984 when he pleaded no contest to charges brought against him involving kidnapping and torturing a man Cianci believed was romantically involved with his ex-wife. His second stint as mayor ended when he was forced to resign following his conviction for one count of racketeering conspiracy, and he served four years in federal prison.

Cianci was first elected mayor as the candidate of the Republican Party. While in office, he declared himself an independent and, as of 2009, he said that he had no party affiliation. On his radio show in June 2014, Cianci announced that he would run for mayor again. He was defeated by Democratic candidate Jorge Elorza in the 2014 election.

== Family and personal life ==
Cianci was born on April 30, 1941, in Providence, Rhode Island. His family lived in the Laurel Hill section of nearby Cranston, Rhode Island. Cianci was the younger child of Dr. Vincent Albert Cianci and Esther Cianci, née Capobianco (whose great-grandfather served as mayor of Benevento, Italy), who married in 1937.

His only marriage, in 1973, was to Sheila Bentley McKenna; the couple divorced in 1983. They had one daughter, Nicole, who died in 2012. Shortly before dying in early 2016, the 74-year-old Cianci announced his engagement to model and actress Tara Marie Haywood, then in her 30s.

=== Education and military service ===
At the age of seven, Cianci began appearing regularly on WJAR's Kiddie Revue Sunday radio broadcast from the Outlet Department Store on Weybosset Street, downtown Providence. After briefly attending public school, Cianci enrolled in Moses Brown School, a private school on the East Side of Providence. There, he became the roommate of Adrian Hendricks, the first Black student to attend the prestigious school. Later, Cianci transferred schools and would earn a bachelor's degree in government at Fairfield University.

Cianci earned a master's degree in Political Science at Villanova University and a Juris Doctor at Marquette University Law School in 1966. Cianci also held honorary doctorates awarded by Fairfield University (his alma mater), Johnson & Wales University, Roger Williams University, and, most recently, from the Southern New England School of Law.

Cianci enlisted in the United States Army on November 29, 1966. He was commissioned as a second lieutenant in the Military Police Corps on April 24, 1967. He served on active duty until 1969 and then in the Army Reserve as a civil affairs officer through 1972.

== Early legal career ==
After being admitted to the Rhode Island Bar Association in 1967, Cianci was hired by Rhode Island Attorney General Herbert F. DeSimone as a special assistant attorney general in 1969. The position was part-time but prestigious. In 1972, Cianci backed up lead prosecutor Irving Brodsky in the trial of mob boss Raymond L.S. Patriarca. Patriarca was found not guilty, but Cianci won praise as an Italian American fighting "The Mob", when the film The Godfather painted an unflattering image of Italian Americans.

In 1973, he became the prosecutor of the Rhode Island Attorney General's Anti-Corruption Strike Force, a position he held until his first election as mayor in 1974. As part of this task force, Cianci was involved in an investigation of Providence Mayor Joseph A. Doorley Jr. Cianci gained a reputation as an anti-corruption crusader.

During this time, Cianci gained political experience working on Attorney General Herbert DeSimone's unsuccessful campaigns for governor in 1970 and 1972.

== Mayor of Providence, 1974–1984 ==
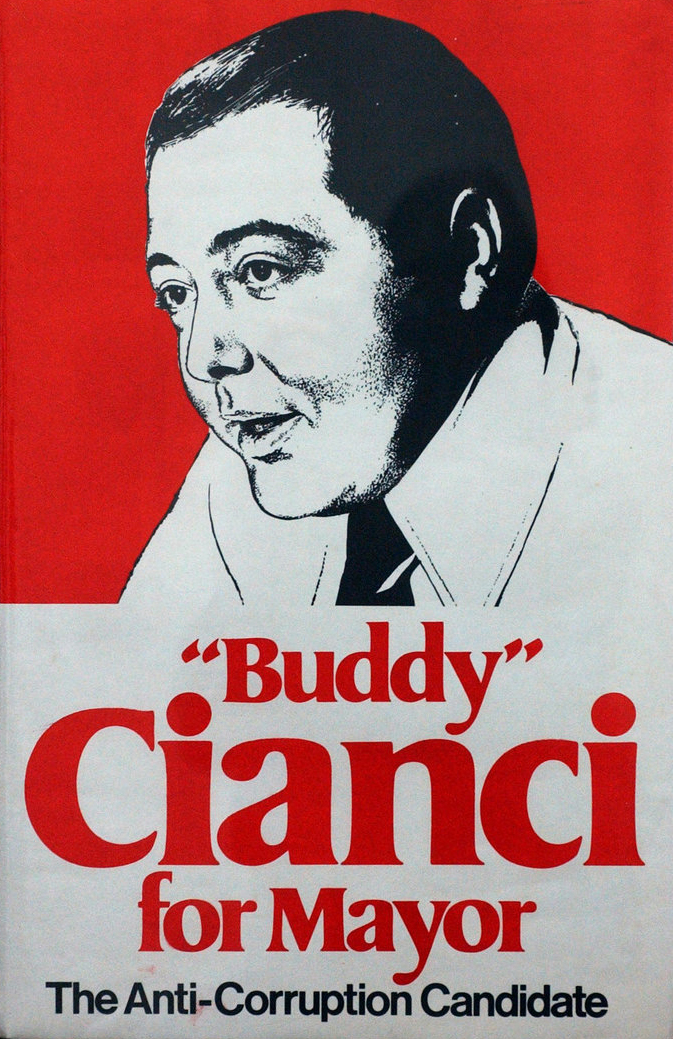
1974 campaign poster

In the fall of 1974, Cianci narrowly beat incumbent Mayor Joseph A. Doorley Jr. on an anti-corruption campaign. Cianci was helped by a revolt of Democrats upset with Doorley's administration. Cianci presented himself as a visionary reformer, outlining plans to revive an economically troubled downtown, rebuild the waterfront, restore blighted neighborhoods, create parks, and improve schools. Positioning himself as "the Anti-Corruption candidate," an Italian-American candidate taking on the Irish-American Democratic machine, Cianci won his first election by 709 votes.

Cianci became the city's first Italian-American Republican mayor, ending a 150-year "power monopoly" held by Irish Democrats. At the age of 33 years, 10 months and seven days, he was then the city's youngest mayor and the first Republican to lead that heavily Democratic city since 1939. Cianci was well known to be a charismatic and media-savvy politician. Cianci's propensity to attend parades, weddings, public events, and backyard neighborhood barbecues prompted a common joke that Cianci would jump to "attend the opening of an envelope". Cianci was revered by many residents of Providence, credited with the revitalizing of the city's economy and image.

In the mid- to late 1970s, Cianci became a rising star in the national Republican Party. After being introduced by Bob Dole, Cianci made an address at the 1976 Republican convention. There was talk of him being the first Italian-American vice president. Cianci was also seriously considered for a federal Cabinet seat in the second Gerald Ford administration, had Ford been elected in 1976. After Ford's loss to Jimmy Carter, Cianci promoted himself as a candidate for one of Rhode Island's U.S. Senate seats, aiming to expand the Republican Party's ethnic votership. Cianci clashed behind the scenes with John Chafee over Rhode Island's Republican nomination for the Senate seat. Chafee was elected to the Senate in 1976 and Cianci was re-elected as Mayor of Providence as a Republican in 1978.

Cianci ran for governor in 1980, losing out to incumbent J. Joseph Garrahy. After this loss, Cianci drifted away from the Republican Party after he was not given an appointment in the Reagan administration despite his support of Ronald Reagan and intimations by Reagan's campaign manager, John Sears. In 1982, he was reelected as Mayor of Providence as an independent.

During his first tenure in office, Buddy Cianci often clashed with the Providence City Council over issues such as the municipal budget. Cianci was supported by political allies in the Providence City Council's Republican minority.

=== First resignation (1984) ===
During Cianci's first administration, the Providence City Council tried to create an ordinance for residents of the city to be able to vote their public officials out of office.

Cianci was forced by law to resign from office for the first time in 1984 after pleading nolo contendere or "no contest" to felony assault of Raymond DeLeo. Cianci claimed that the man had been romantically involved with his wife, from whom Cianci was separated at the time. Both DeLeo and Cianci's estranged wife disputed the relationship. Cianci and his driver were charged with kidnapping, beating, and torturing DeLeo. Providence municipal regulations prohibit a convicted felon from holding public office. Ironically, Cianci had promulgated that rule a few years earlier.

After Cianci's resignation, a special election was held to name a replacement. Cianci attempted to run in the election under the rubric that he had been convicted of a felony but received a five-year suspended sentence rather than being sent to prison. After a few weeks, it was decided by the Rhode Island Supreme Court that Cianci could not run in the special election, because the legislative intent was that the convicted incumbent could not succeed himself in office. The special election was won by City Council Chairman, Acting Mayor, and future ambassador to Malta Joseph R. Paolino Jr.

== Talk show host, 1984–1991 ==
Cianci spent the next few years as a radio talk show host on Providence AM station 920 WHJJ and as a television commentator. In 1990, he successfully mounted a reelection campaign with the slogan, "He never stopped caring about Providence."

In the early 2000s, Cianci also made several guest appearances as himself on the television show Providence.

== Mayor of Providence, 1991–2002 ==
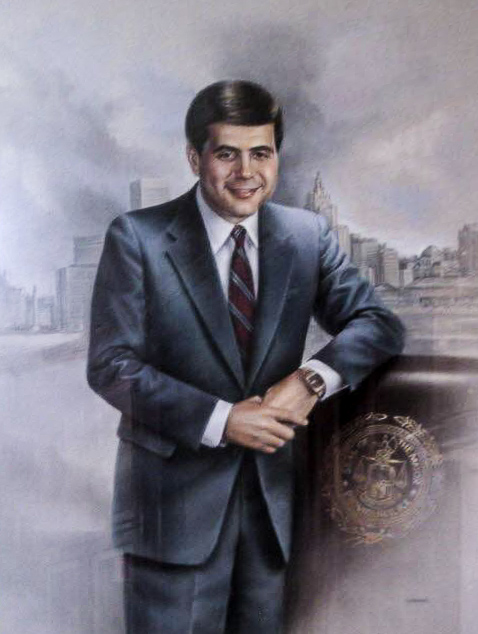
Official portrait in Providence City Hall

During Cianci's second run as mayor, beginning in 1991, the city of Providence entered its "Renaissance phase".

During his tenure, Providence became visibly cleaner and more tourist-friendly. Cianci brought the Providence Bruins hockey team to Rhode Island from Maine and pushed to further several projects in the city, including new hotels, the Providence Place shopping mall and the Fleet Skating Center. He also helped to orchestrate the establishment of the summer weekend festivals known as WaterFire in downtown Providence, which continues to bring up to 100,000 people to the downtown area alone on the summer nights it takes place.

=== Mayor's Own Marinara Sauce ===
In 1995, Cianci launched a brand of tomato sauce, "Mayor's Own Marinara Sauce". It was claimed that proceeds from sales were "Benefiting Providence School Children" and helped hundreds of students attend college. However, an August 2014 Associated Press (AP) report found that "in recent years, no money from the sauce's sales has been donated to Cianci's charity scholarship fund." From 2009 to 2012, the sauce made a total of $3 in income, longtime Cianci adviser Charles Mansolillo told the AP. In 2009, they lost $2,200 on the sauce, Mansolillo said. The following year, they made $2,974, while in 2011, they lost $2,969. In 2012, they made $2,198 profit, he said. That adds up to a profit of just $3 during the four-year period.

=== Arts-friendly city ===
In 1996, Cianci pushed to create an arts and entertainment district in downtown Providence by offering income and sales tax breaks to attract artists to downtown. Cianci said the tax breaks were part of an arts-centered economic development strategy. The idea was to develop an image of Providence as an "artist-friendly" city; this would attract not only artists but also well-educated workers, high-technology firms, economic development, and tourism. The strategy was copied as a model by Baltimore and other cities.

In 1998, Cianci ran again for reelection, unopposed on the ballot. The popular Cianci had never lost a mayoral election, until losing to Jorge Elorza in November 2014.

=== Operation Plunder Dome ===
Cianci was indicted in April 2001 on federal criminal charges of racketeering, conspiracy, extortion, witness tampering, and mail fraud. Several other Providence city officials were also indicted. Judge Ronald R. Lagueux said of the case: "Clearly, there is a feeling in city government in Providence that corruption is tolerated. In this mayor's two administrations, there has been more corruption in the City of Providence than in the history of this state."

Much of the trial was focused around a video tape showing top Cianci aide Director of Administration Frank A. Corrente taking a bribe. NBC reporter Jim Taricani aired the tape on local television station WJAR, and he was sentenced to six months of house arrest for refusing to reveal his sources to the court. Cianci did not maintain a low profile after the indictment but poked fun at the investigation, code-named "Operation Plunder Dome". Nine people (including Cianci) were convicted in the trials, which were presided over by Judge Ernest C. Torres. Cianci was acquitted of 26 out of 27 charges, including bribery, extortion, and mail fraud, but he was found guilty of racketeering conspiracy, running a corrupt criminal enterprise.

In September 2002, Cianci was sentenced to serve five years in federal prison by Judge Torres, who opted for a higher sentence than the minimum required by the Federal Sentencing Guidelines. Cianci was forced by law to resign immediately following the sentencing.

Between his sentencing and the start of his prison term, Cianci resumed his radio career hosting a midday show with former Providence radio host (and former director of communications to Governor Don Carcieri) Steve Kass on AM talk station WPRO. After some legal wrangling, Cianci's lawyers managed to have him sent to prison closer to Rhode Island, and Cianci served his sentence at the Federal Correctional Institution, Fort Dix, in Burlington County, New Jersey. Cianci appealed the conviction to the United States Court of Appeals for the First Circuit but was unsuccessful. In August 2005, Cianci made a request for early release but was denied.

== Later life ==
Cianci was released from prison on May 30, 2007, to a halfway house near Northeastern University in Boston.

Upon his initial release from federal prison, he had already secured a job in marketing and sales for the XV Beacon, a luxury hotel in Boston. However, he ultimately chose to return to Rhode Island and began work at the 903 Residences in Providence.

On the animated sitcom Family Guy (set in Rhode Island), Chris attended Buddy Cianci Junior High School. One episode released in 2005 was titled "Fast Times at Buddy Cianci Jr. High".

=== Political commentator ===
On September 20, 2007, Cianci returned to the airwaves on local Providence AM radio station WPRO, hosting a weekday talk show. He said that he had no plans to run for political office again, although he had not entirely ruled it out when pressed on the issue. On October 24, 2007, Cianci appeared on WLNE-TV ABC6 to announce that in addition to his radio show, he was joining the television station as chief political analyst and contributing editor. The work included moderating a weekly political segment called Your Attention Please, which was renamed Buddy TV. The timeslot became a daily segment in July 2008, and was renamed The World According to Buddy as of May 2011. His position at WLNE began on November 1, 2007. Cianci also hosted the station's weekend public affairs program On the Record with Buddy Cianci. He began in October 2008 as cohost of the program with WLNE weeknight anchor John DeLuca and became solo host in May 2011.

=== 2014 campaign for Mayor of Providence ===
Cianci became eligible to run for mayor again in the year 2012, three years after his probation ended (due to the provisions of the 1986 Rhode Island constitutional amendment, aptly named "the Buddy amendment"). The next election in which Cianci would have been eligible to run was the November 2014. In 2010, Cianci was quoted as saying that he was "taking a good look" at running for the U.S. House seat to be vacated by Democrat Patrick J. Kennedy. He did not declare his candidacy.

In May 2014, Cianci, after being successfully treated for cancer, was cleared by his doctors to run for mayor in the 2014 November election. On June 25, Cianci declared his candidacy for Mayor of Providence as an independent. In August, he named former Cianci staffer Cyd McKenna as his campaign manager and Dee Dee Witman as his finance chair, alongside other former staffers Charles Mansolillo and Beryl Kenyon. Providence hip-hop artist Zumo Kollie released a song titled "Buddy Cianci" on November 4, 2014. His campaign was unsuccessful and he lost narrowly to Democrat Jorge Elorza, conceding the election on November 4.

=== Illness and death ===
In January 2014, Cianci was diagnosed with colon cancer.

Cianci died on January 28, 2016, at the age of 74. He had been taken to the hospital the previous day after experiencing abdominal pain while filming his television show, On the Record with Buddy Cianci, at the WLNE-TV studio.

Thousands of people viewed Cianci's open casket as his body lay in state for two days in Providence City Hall, the first mayor to be so honored since Thomas Doyle in 1886. A horse-drawn carriage carried his casket through the city during a snowstorm on February 8, as it made its way to the Cathedral of Saints Peter and Paul where Roman Catholic Bishop Thomas Joseph Tobin presided over a funeral mass. The funeral procession then passed through Olneyville and Silver Lake, where Cianci grew up, ending at St. Ann's Cemetery in Cranston for a private burial next to his parents and daughter, Nicole.

== Further reading and documentary film ==
- The Prince of Providence, a book by Mike Stanton (ISBN 0-375-50780-9) details Cianci's life, from childhood, to mob-busting prosecutor, to mayor, to conviction. The Trinity Repertory Company in Providence, Rhode Island, began its 2019–20 season with the world premiere of The Prince of Providence by George Brant, based on the book. The musical "Buddy" Cianci: The Musical was created by Jonathan Van Gieson and Mike Tarantino and was performed off-Broadway. It derived much of its material from Stanton's book.
- Politics and Pasta: How I Prosecuted Mobsters, Rebuilt a Dying City, Advised a President, Dined with Sinatra, Spent Five Years in a Federally Funded Gated Community, and Lived to Tell the Tale, a book by Vincent "Buddy" Cianci with David Fisher (ISBN 978-0312592806), is Cianci's memoir.
- Cianci is the subject of the documentary film Buddy: The Rise and Fall of America's Most Notorious Mayor (OCLC 186366455), directed by Cherry Arnold and narrated by James Woods.
- Season One of Crimetown, a podcast by Marc Smerling and Zac Stuart-Pontier, focuses on Mayor Cianci's ties to organized crime in New England.

.

Political offices
Preceded by Joseph A. Doorley Jr.	Mayor of Providence; 1975–1984	Succeeded by Joseph R. Paolino Jr.
Preceded by Joseph R. Paolino Jr.	Mayor of Providence; 1991–2002	Succeeded by John J. Lombardi
Party political offices
Preceded by Lincoln Almond	Republican nominee for Governor of Rhode Island; 1980	Succeeded by Vincent Marzullo
