= Sally J. Novetzke =

American political aide and diplomat (1932–2025)

- Novetzke in 2018

11th United States Ambassador to Malta
- In office November 9, 1989 – February 28, 1993
- President: George H. W. Bush; Bill Clinton
- Preceded by: Peter R. Sommer
- Succeeded by: Joseph R. Paolino Jr.

Personal details
- Born: Sally Johnson; January 12, 1932 Stillwater, Minnesota, U.S.
- Died: January 29, 2025 (aged 93) Cedar Rapids, Iowa, U.S.
- Party: Republican
- Spouse: Richard Novetzke
- Children: 4

Sally J. Novetzke (née Johnson; January 12, 1932 – January 29, 2025) was an American political aide and diplomat who served as the United States Ambassador to Malta from 1989 to 1993.

== Life and career ==
Sally Johnson was born on January 12, 1932, in Stillwater, Minnesota. She became interested in politics from a young age, learning from her father, who was a fan of Herbert Hoover. She attended Carleton College in Northfield, Minnesota, where she studied history and political science, but left before graduating to marry Richard Novetzke, a pilot in the U.S. Navy. Sally had the couple's first two children while the couple were living in Hawaii. The couple had four children in total.

=== Political career ===
George H. W. Bush met Novetzke for the first time in 1979, while he was campaigning in Iowa. The next day, he asked her to be the Linn County chairwoman for his presidential campaign, a position she served in until 1980. Novetzke went on to work on other campaigns, including the 1980 and 1984 Reagan/Bush campaigns, and George H. W. Bush's 1988 presidential campaign. From 1974 to 1988, she was a delegate to " state, district, and county Republican conventions," and a delegate at the 1980 Republican National Convention. In 1984, she was a delegate both to the Republican National Committee and the Permanent Organization Committee; at the 1988 Republican convention, she was a delegate-at-large.

From 1982 to 1985, she ran Iowa's Republican Party, the first woman to do so. She then led the Iowa Federation of Republican Women from 1987 to 1989. She also served on the boards of the Ronald Reagan Presidential Library, the Hoover Presidential Foundation, and the National Council on Vocational Education.

When Bush was elected president in 1988, he asked her to be Ambassador to Malta. She moved to Malta in November 1989. The following month, she was in charge of the team that coordinated the 1989 Malta Summit between Bush and Mikhail Gorbachev. Speaking to The Washington Post in 1989, she noted that after the summit her priorities would include increased trade between the U.S. and Malta, and increased American investment in the country. She said she planned to involve a number of American executives whom she had met while working for the National Council on Vocational Education.

=== Later life and death ===
Novetzke maintained a close friendship with Barbara Bush following their first meeting in 1988. She attended George H. W. Bush's funeral in 2018.

Novetzke died in Cedar Rapids, Iowa, on January 29, 2025, at the age of 93.
