= Jim Taricani =

American reporter (1949–2019)

Jim Taricani (August 12, 1949 – June 21, 2019) was an American reporter, who served a sentence of six months of home confinement for refusing a court order to divulge a source.

== Biography ==
Taricani, an investigative reporter for WJAR television, an NBC affiliate in Cranston, Rhode Island, refused to reveal who leaked a surveillance tape to him. He was convicted of criminal contempt of court on November 18, 2004, and sentenced on December 9, 2004, to six months of home confinement.

The tape was used during a municipal corruption probe of then-Providence Mayor Vincent "Buddy" Cianci known as Operation Plunder Dome.

He lectured at journalism schools throughout the country and worked with the Reporters Committee for Freedom of the Press to urge Congressional passage of a federal shield law for reporters.

Taricani retired in April 2014. He died of kidney failure on June 21, 2019.

Taricani was the recipient of a heart transplant in 1996. He was a volunteer spokesperson for the Rhode Island branch of the American Heart Association.
