= Daniel P. McKiernan =

American politician and lawyer

Member of the Rhode Island House of Representatives from the 7th district
- In office January 5, 2015 – January 5, 2021
- Preceded by: Maria Cimini
- Succeeded by: David Morales

Personal details
- Party: Democratic Party

Daniel P. McKiernan is an American politician and lawyer who represented the 7th district in the Rhode Island House of Representatives from 2015 to 2021. A member of the Democratic Party, McKiernan was elected to the state house in 2014. McKiernan attempted to run for re-election in 2020, but lost in a three-way primary to David Morales.

== Early life and education ==
McKiernan graduated from Bishop Hendricken High School in 1984. He earned a bachelor’s degree in economics from Boston College in 1988 and a Juris Doctor from Boston College Law School in 1991.

== Career ==
McKiernan was first elected to the state house in 2014. He was elected by primarying incumbent representative Maria Cimini with support from house speaker Nicholas Mattiello, who supported McKiernan because Cimini did not support Mattiello's bid to become house speaker. Throughout his period in the state house, McKiernan garnered a reputation for being "ordinary", voting along party lines and rarely sponsoring legislation. In 2020, McKiernan faced two primary challengers, David Morales, a progressive who had support from the Democratic Socialists of America and the Sunrise Movement, and Angel Subervi, a centrist who primaried McKiernan due to the latter being perceived as out of touch with his district. McKiernan lost the primary to Morales, getting 28% of the vote to Morales' 49%, with Subervi getting 23%.

== Personal life ==
McKiernan has a wife, with whom they have two children.
