= Maria Cimini =

American politician

Member of the Rhode Island House of Representatives from the 7th district
- In office January 2011 – January 2015
- Preceded by: Joanne Giannini
- Succeeded by: Daniel P. McKiernan

Personal details
- Born: August 26, 1976 (age 50)
- Party: Democratic
- Education: Rhode Island College
- Website: mariacimini.com

Maria E. Cimini (born August 26, 1976) is an American politician and a former Democratic member of the Rhode Island House of Representatives, representing District 7 from 2011 to 2015.

== Education ==
Cimini earned her BA in political science and her MSW from Rhode Island College.

== Elections ==
- 2014 Cimini was defeated in the Democratic primary by Daniel P. McKiernan, receiving 933 votes to his 1,075 votes.
- 2012 Cimini was unopposed for both the September 11, 2012 Democratic Primary, winning with 874 votes and the November 6, 2012 General election, winning with 3,366 votes.
- 2010 When District 7 Democratic Representative Joanne Giannini retired and left the seat open, Cimini ran in the September 23, 2010 Democratic Primary, winning with 1,207 votes (59.3%) and was unopposed for the November 2, 2010 General election, winning with 2,773 votes.
