= Mayoral elections in Providence, Rhode Island =

Elections are held in Providence, Rhode Island to elect the city's mayor. Such elections are regularly scheduled to be held in United States midterm election years.

== 1998 ==
1998 Providence mayoral election
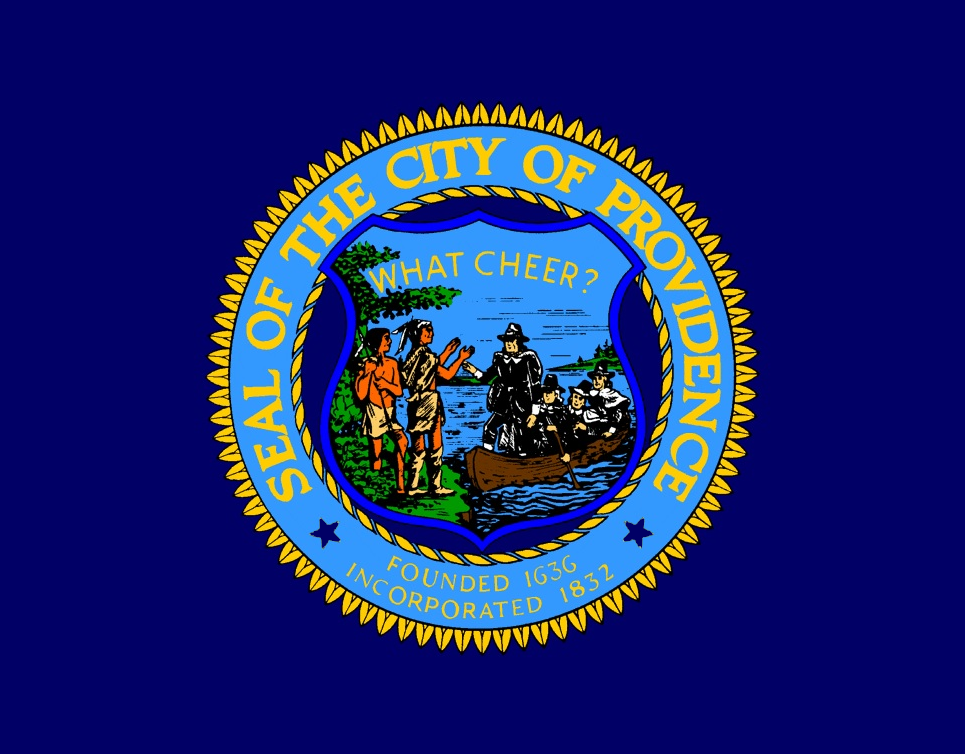
- November 3, 1998
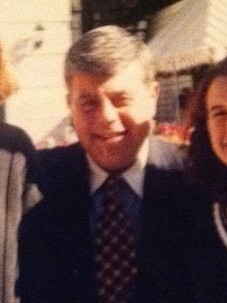
Candidate	Buddy Cianci
Party	Independent
Popular vote	23,746
Percentage	96.84%
Mayor before election
Buddy Cianci
Independent
Elected mayor
Buddy Cianci
Independent

The 1998 Providence, Rhode Island mayoral election was held on November 3, 1998. It saw the reelection of Buddy Cianci to sixth overall, and third consecutive, term. Cianci ran unchallenged.

1998 Providence mayoral election
Party	Candidate	Votes	%
Independent	Buddy Cianci	23,746	96.84
Write-in	Others	774	3.16
Total votes		24,520	100

== 2002 ==
2002 Providence mayoral election
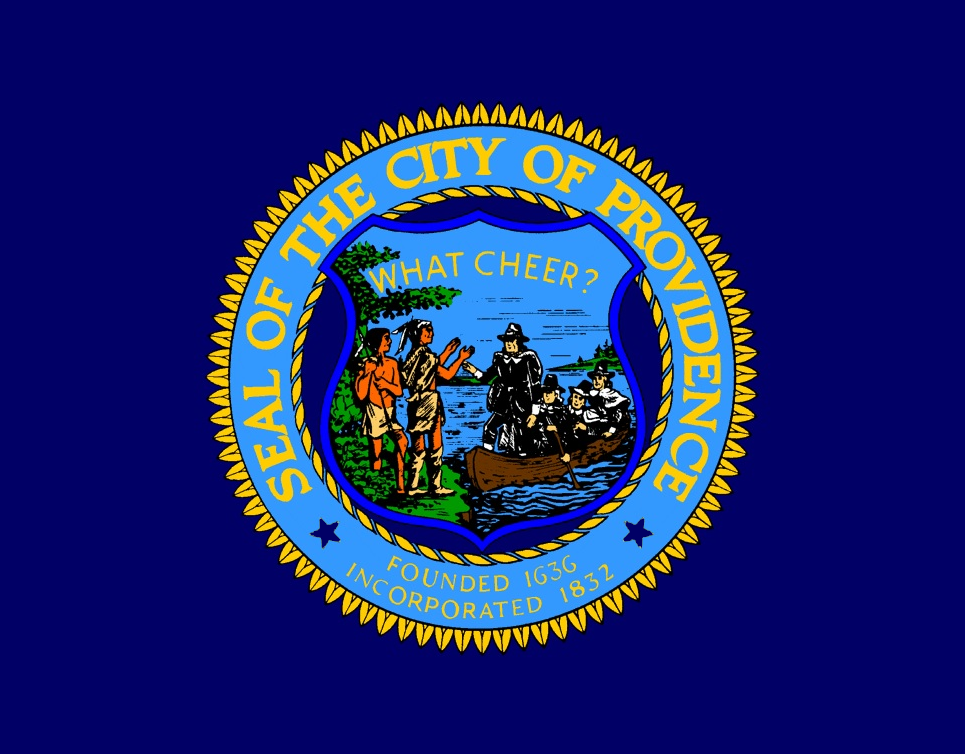
- November 5, 2002
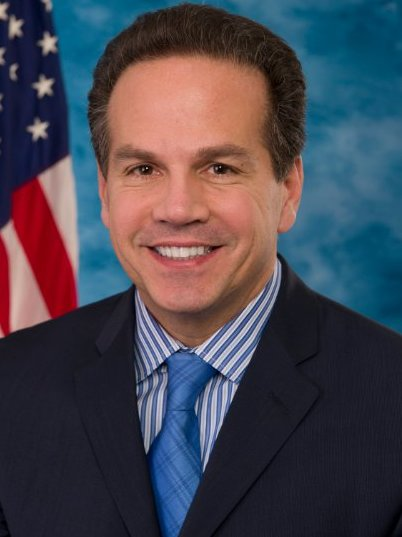

Candidate	David Cicilline	David Talan
Party	Democratic	Republican
Popular vote	29,843	3,453
Percentage	83.83%	9.70%
Mayor before election
John J. Lombardi (acting)
Democratic
Elected mayor
David Cicilline
Democratic

The 2002 Providence, Rhode Island mayoral election was held on November 5, 2002. It saw the election of Democratic nominee David Cicilline in a landslide victory.

Cicilline was openly gay. After Cicilline took office, Providence became the largest city in the United States at the time to have had an openly LGBTQ mayor (a distinction which had, beforehand, belonged to Tempe, Arizona since its election of Neil Giuliano).

=== Democratic primary ===
The Democratic Party held its primary election on September 10, 2002.

==== Candidates ====
- David Cicilline, member of the Rhode Island House of Representatives since 1995
- David V. Igliozzi, Rhode Island state senator and former Providence city councilor
- Kevin McKenna, attorney
- Joseph R. Paolino Jr., former mayor of Providence (1984–1991) and former United States ambassador to Malta (1994–1996)

Withdrew

- Thomas O'Connor

==== Polls ====
Poll source	Date(s) administered	Sample size	Margin of error	David Cicilline	David Igliozzi	Kevin McKenna	Joseph R. Paolino Jr.	Undecided
			± 4.5%	50%	10%	4%	32%	4%

==== Campaigning ====
David Ciciline and Kevin McKenna launched their campaigns prior to the June conviction of incumbent mayor Buddy Cianci, and criticized the disgraced mayor. Paolino and Igliozzi launched their candidacies after Cianci's conviction, and did not openly criticize Cianci. Igliozzi had once worked in the city's solicitor's office during Cianci's mayoralty.

Paloino pledged to revitalize blighted areas of the city by cleaning up their parks and schools, and by increasing community police officers.

Ciciline also advocated for the arts, and proposed making gallery and studio space available to more residents.

While Ciciline was openly gay, Paolino sought to challenge him for support of the city's gay voters.

==== Results ====
2002 Providence Democratic mayoral primary
Party	Candidate	Votes	%
Democratic	David N. Cicilline	14,167	52.09
Democratic	Joseph R. Paolino, Jr.	9,253	34.02
Democratic	David V. Igliozzi	3,047	11.20
Democratic	Christopher Young	730	2.68
Turnout		27,197	28.38

=== General election ===
==== Candidates ====
- David Cicilline (Democrat), member of the Rhode Island House of Representatives since 1995
- Greg Gerritt (Green)
- David Talin (Republican)
- Christopher Young (independent)

Withdrew

- Pat Cortelessa (independent)
- Robert Farrow (independent)

==== Campaigning ====
It was anticipated that the winner of the Democratic Party primary would be the race's frontrunner in the strongly Democratic city's mayoral race.

The sexuality of Cecilline, vying to become the city's first openly homosexual mayor, was not a prominent issue in the campaign. Some in the gay community even criticized Cecilline, accusing him of downplaying his sexuality in order to appeal more broadly to voters.

==== Polls ====
Throughout the campaign, Cecilline was a strong leader in polls.

Poll source	Date(s) administered	Sample size	Margin of error	David Cicilline (D)	Greg Gerritt (G)	Dave Talan (R)	Christopher Young (i)	Undecided
Brown University	September 14–22, 2002	506 LV	± 4%	70%	2%	4%	1%	23%

==== Results ====
2002 Providence mayoral election
Party	Candidate	Votes	%
Democratic	David N. Cicilline	29,843	83.83
Republican	David B. Talan	3,453	9.70
Green	Greg Gerritt	1,371	3.85
Independent	Christopher F. Young	931	2.62
Total votes		35,598	100

== 2006 ==
2006 Providence mayoral election
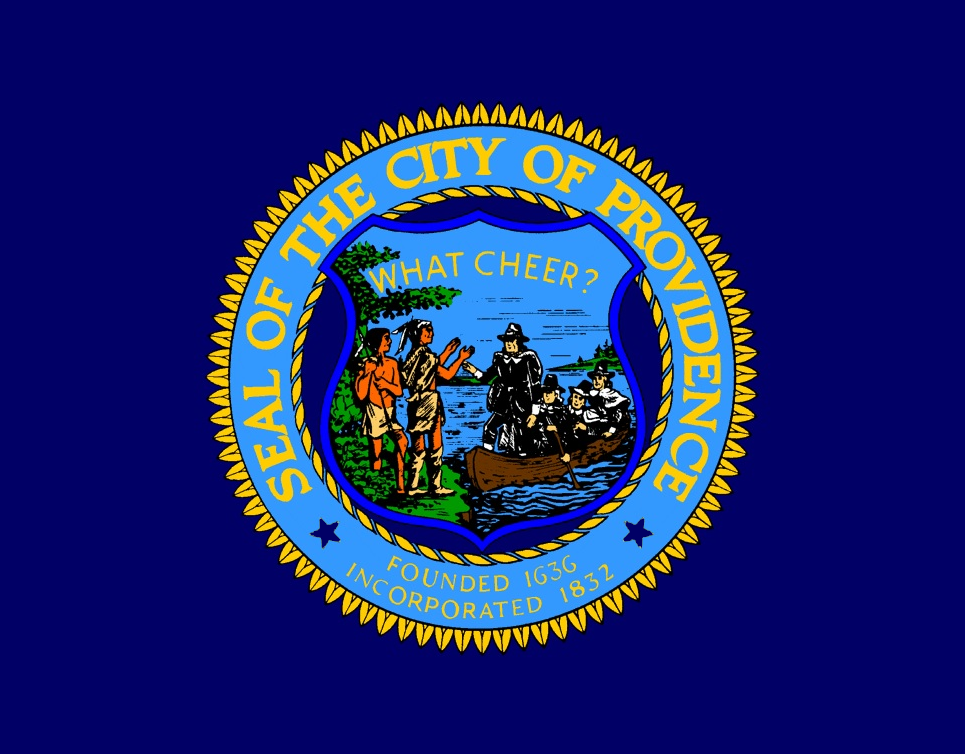
- November 7, 2006
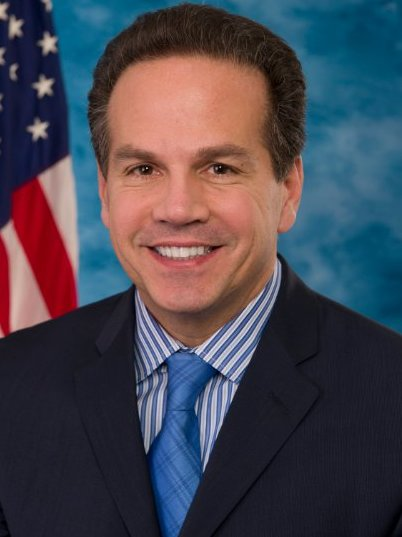

Candidate	David Cicilline	Daniel S. Harrop III
Party	Democratic	Republican
Popular vote	30,835	6,119
Percentage	83.44%	16.56%
Mayor before election
David Cicilline
Democratic
Elected mayor
David Cicilline
Democratic

The 2006 Providence, Rhode Island mayoral election was held on November 7, 2006. It saw the reelection of incumbent Democrat David Cicilline.

=== Democratic primary ===
The Democratic Party's primary election was held on September 12, 2006.

==== Candidates ====
- David Cicilline, incumbent mayor since 2003
- Christopher F. Young, perennial candidate (including as the Reform nominee for United States Senate in 2000 and as a candidate for mayor in 2002)

==== Results ====
2006 Providence Democratic mayoral primary
Party	Candidate	Votes	%
Democratic	David N. Cicilline (incumbent)	11,849	73.95
Democratic	Christopher F. Young	4,175	26.06
Total votes		16,024	100

=== General election ===
Cicilline faced Republican nominee Daniel S. Harrop III, who had previously run for state house in 2002 as a Libertarian and in 2004 as a Republican.

2006 Providence mayoral election
Party	Candidate	Votes	%
Democratic	David N. Cicilline (incumbent)	30,835	83.44
Republican	Daniel S. Harrop III	6,119	16.56
Total votes		36,954	100

== 2010 ==
2010 Providence mayoral election
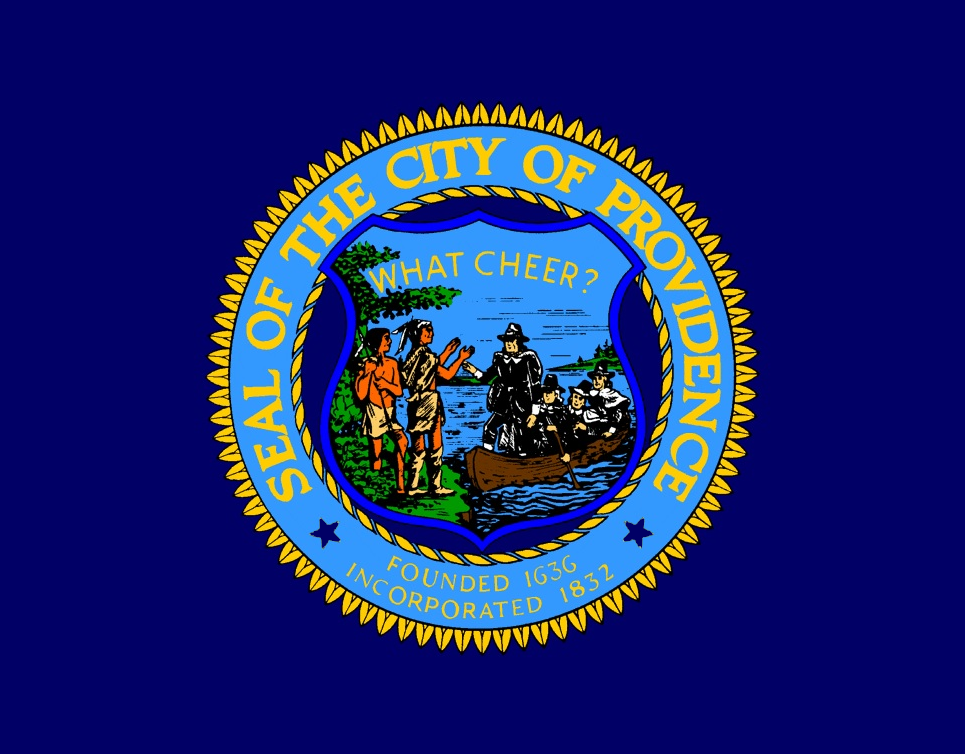
- November 2, 2010
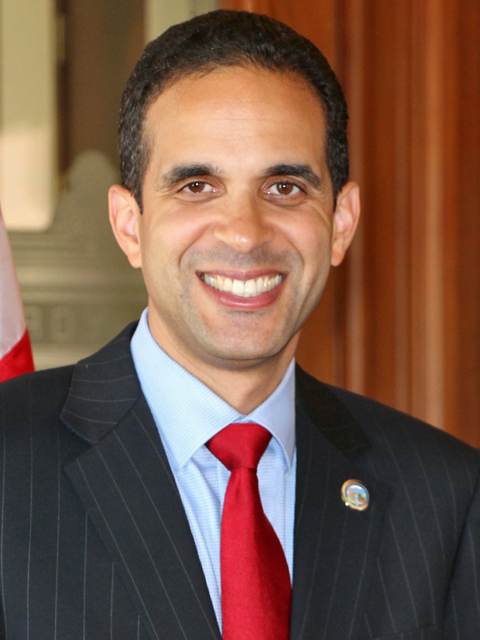

Candidate	Angel Taveras	Jonathan P. Scott
Party	Democratic	Independent
Popular vote	27,528	6,006
Percentage	82.1%	17.9%
Mayor before election
David Cicilline
Democratic
Elected mayor
Angel Taveras
Democratic

The 2010 Providence, Rhode Island mayoral election was held on November 2, 2010. The election saw the election of Angel Taveras.

Taveras became the first Hispanic mayor of the city and the third elected and fourth serving Dominican-American mayor in the United States.

Incumbent David Cicilline did not seek reelection, instead opting to run in the coinciding election for Rhode Island's 1st congressional district. Cicilline was eligible to seek reelection to a third consecutive term as mayor, as term limits passed in 2006 (which limited mayors to two consecutive terms) would not go into effect until the following year.

=== Democratic primary ===
==== Results ====
Primary election results
Party	Candidate	Votes	%
Democratic	Angel Taveras	11,897	49.1%
Democratic	John J. Lombardi	7,050	29.1%
Democratic	Steven M. Costantino	4,867	20.1%
Democratic	Christopher Young	392	1.6%

=== General election ===
==== Results ====
General election results
Party	Candidate	Votes	%
Democratic	Angel Taveras	27,528	82.1%
Independent	Jonathan P. Scott	6,006	17.9%

== 2014 ==
2014 Providence mayoral election
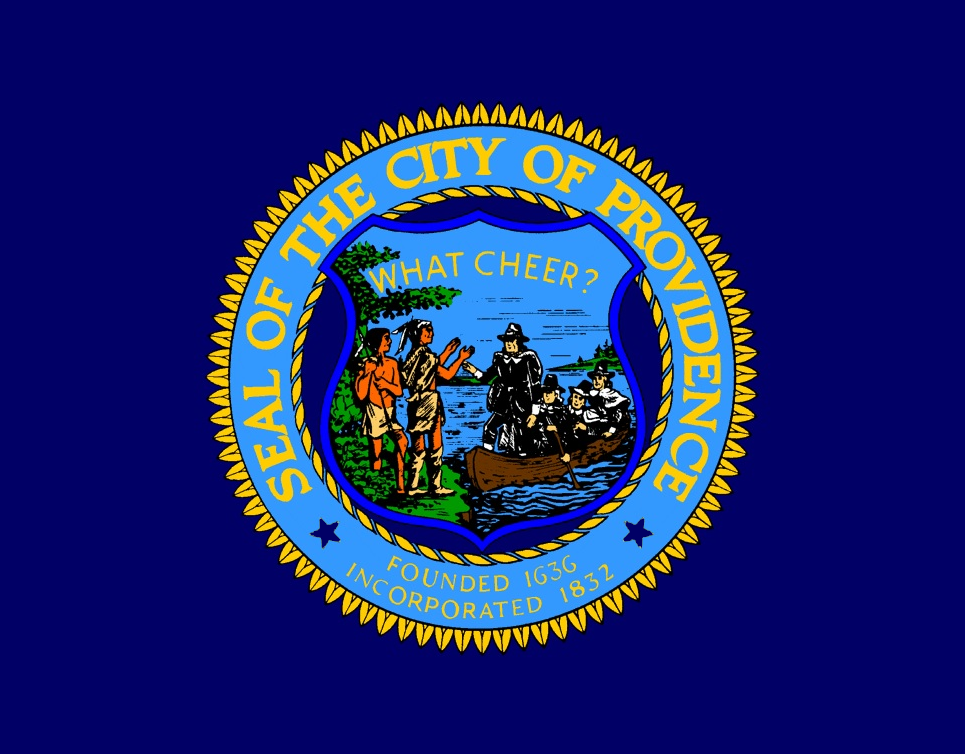
- November 4, 2014
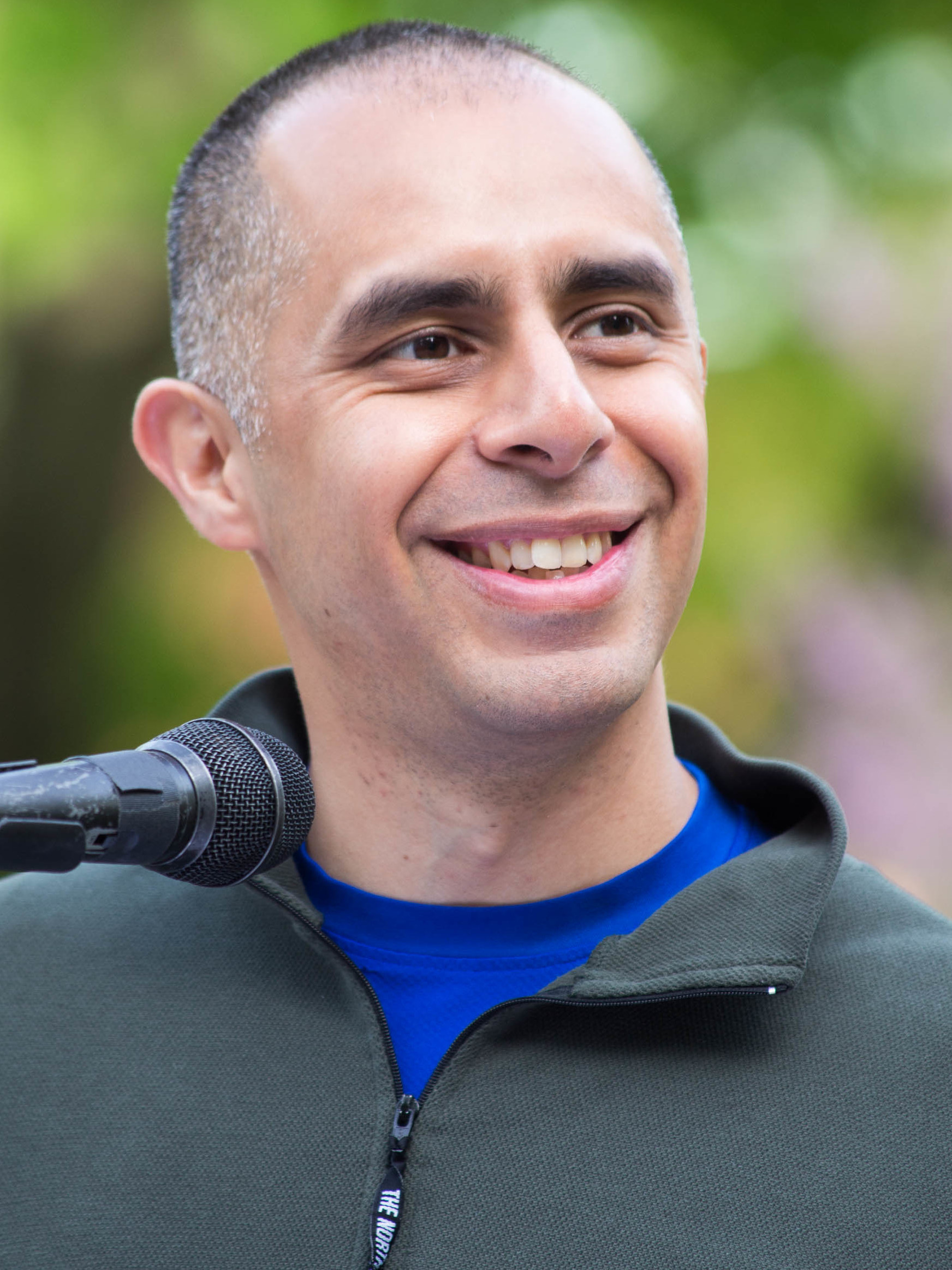

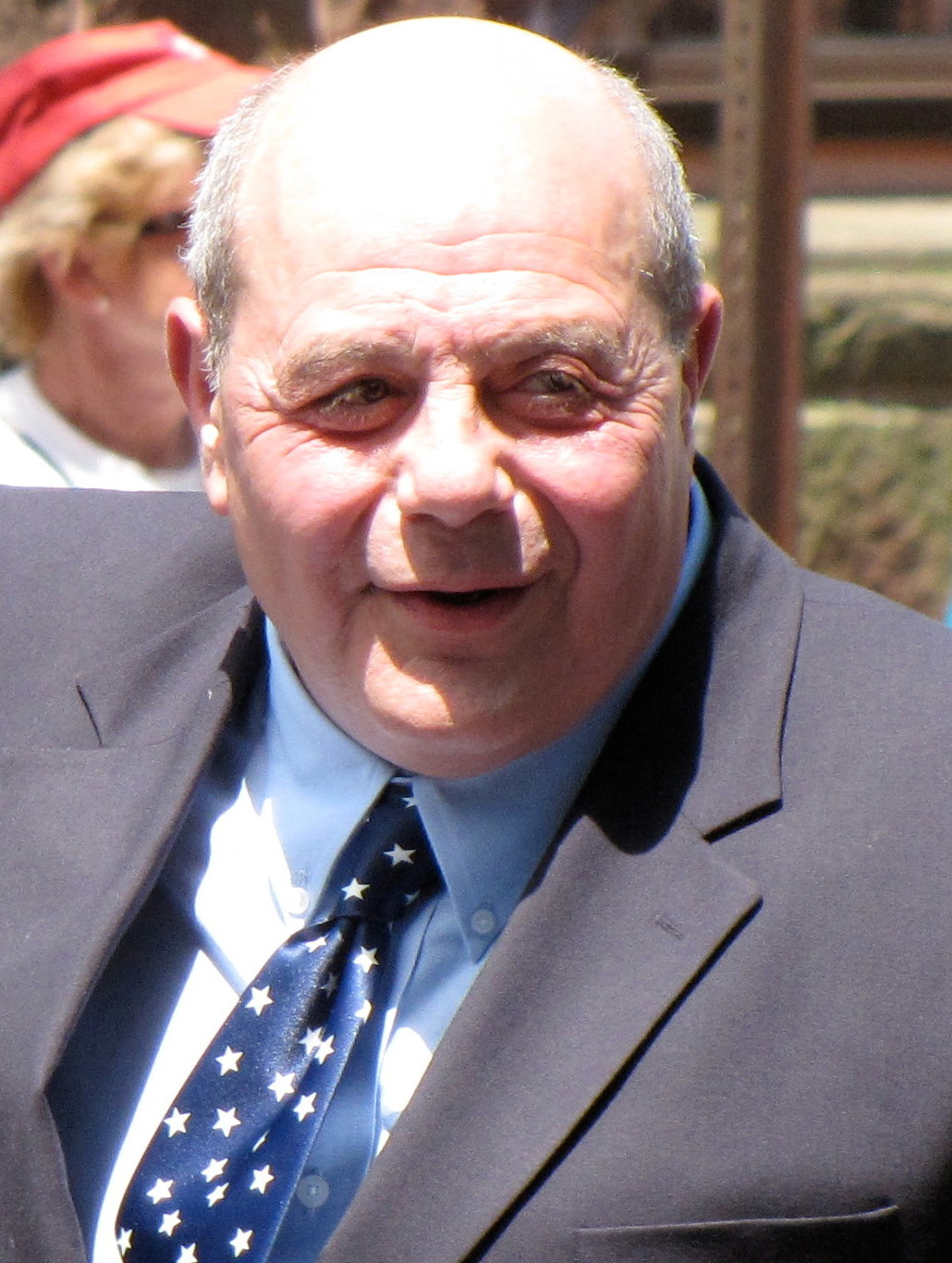
Candidate	Jorge Elorza	Buddy Cianci
Party	Democratic	Independent
Popular vote	20,027	17,306
Percentage	52.1%	45.0%
Mayor before election
Angel Taveras
Democratic
Elected mayor
Jorge Elorza
Democratic

The 2014 Providence, Rhode Island mayoral election was held on November 4, 2014. The election saw the election of Jorge Elorza.

Incumbent Angel Taveras did not seek reelection, and instead (unsuccessfully) sought the Democratic nomination in the coinciding Rhode Island gubernatorial election.

=== Democratic primary ===
The Democratic primary was held on September 9, 2014.

==== Results ====
Despite still appearing on the ballot, Brett Smiley had withdrawn and endorsed Elorza before the primary was held.

2014 Providence Democratic mayoral primary
Party	Candidate	Votes	%
Democratic	Jorge Elorza	11,051	48.7%
Democratic	Michael A. Solomon	9,870	43.5%
Democratic	Christopher F. Young	1,049	4.6%
Democratic	Brett Smiley	745	3.3%

=== General election ===
The election pinned Democratic primary winner Jorge Elorza against former mayor Buddy Cianci, who was running as an independent, and Republican Daniel S. Harrop.

Elorza was endorsed by United States President Barack Obama.

On July 14, 2014, businessman Lorne Adrian withdrew his independent candidacy.

Independent candidate Jeffrey E. Lemire failed to get his name on the ballot.

Cianci had previously served as mayor from 1975–84 and 1991–2002, each time being ousted due to criminal convictions. A prominent issue was made of his past convictions. Cianci characterized Elorza as inexperienced, and called a possible return to the mayoralty for a third tenure as a "last rodeo" for himself.

==== Debate ====
2014 Providence mayoral debate
No.	Date	Host	Moderator	Link	Democratic	Independent	Republican
Key: P Participant A Absent N Not invited I Invited W Withdrawn							
Key: P Participant A Absent N Not invited I Invited W Withdrawn					Jorge Elorza	Buddy Cianci	Daniel Harrop
1	Sep. 30, 2014	The Providence Journal; WPRI-TV	Tim White	YouTube	P	P	P

==== Results ====
2014 Providence mayoral election
Party	Candidate	Votes	%
Democratic	Jorge O. Elorza	20,027	52.1%
Independent	Vincent A. Cianci, Jr.	17,306	45.0%
Republican	Daniel S. Harrop	1,049	2.6%
Write-in	Write-in	88	0.2%
Total votes		38,470	

== 2018 ==
2018 Providence mayoral election
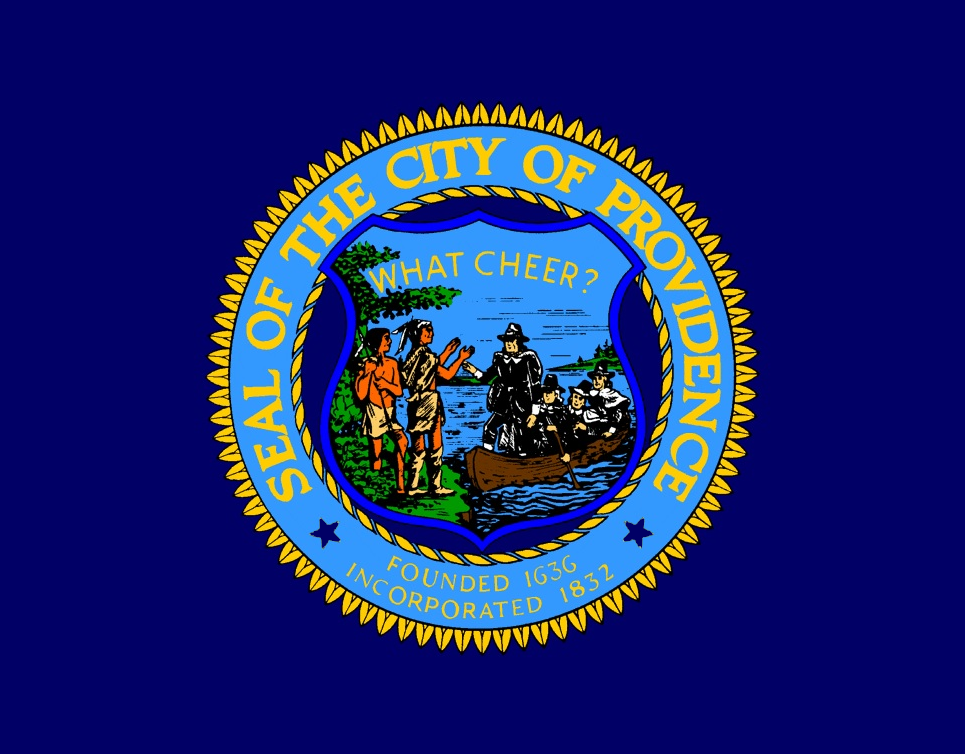
- November 6, 2018
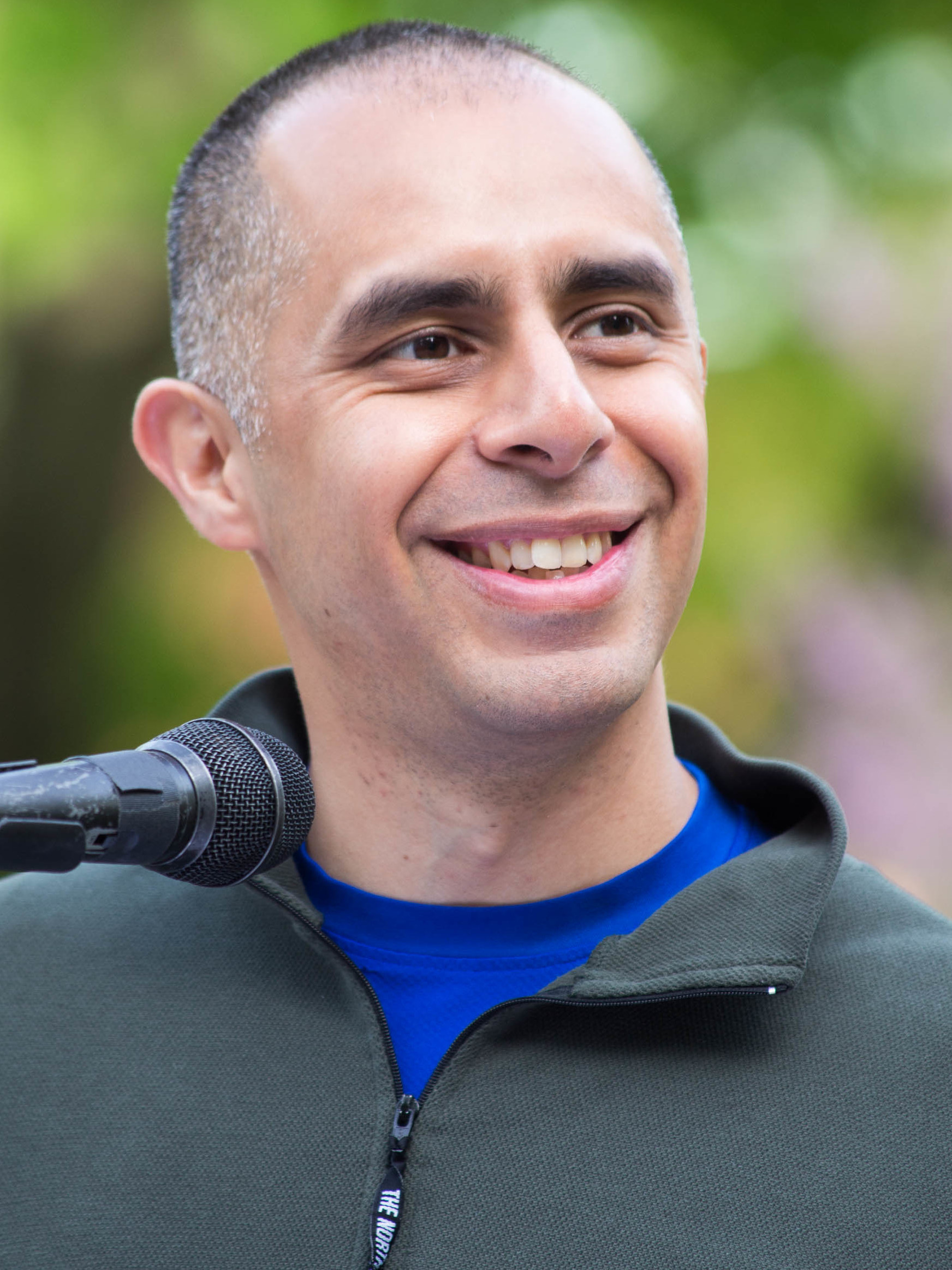

Candidate	Jorge Elorza	Dianne S. Witman
Party	Democratic	Independent
Popular vote	26,935	14,016
Percentage	63.6%	33.1%
Mayor before election
Jorge Elorza
Democratic
Elected mayor
Jorge Elorza
Democratic

The 2018 Providence, Rhode Island mayoral election was held on November 6, 2018. The election saw the reelection of Jorge Elorza.

=== Democratic primary ===
On September 12, 2018, incumbent mayor Jorge Elorza won renomination by the Democratic Party, defeating challengers Kobi Dennis and Robert DeRobbio.

Elorza had been endorsed by the party organization ahead of the primary.

==== Polls ====
Poll source	Date(s) administered	Sample size	Margin of error	Lorne Adrian	Kobi Dennis	Robert DeRobbio	Jorge Elorza	John Lombardi	Other	Undecided
John Zogby Strategies	April 4–8, 2019	424	± 5%	6.5%	8.3%	5.4%	35.9%	18.3%	8.2%	17.3%
John Zogby Strategies	April 4–8, 2019	424	± 5%	–	–	–	45.8%	33.3%	–	–

==== Results ====
Primary election results
Party	Candidate	Votes	%
Democratic	Jorge O. Elorza (incumbent)	13,363	57.4%
Democratic	Kobi Jason Dennis	5,425	23.3%
Democratic	Robert A. DeRobbio	4,493	19.3%

=== General election ===
==== Results ====
2018 Providence mayoral election
Party	Candidate	Votes	%
Democratic	Jorge O. Elorza (incumbent)	26,935	63.6%
Independent	Dianne S. Witman	14,016	33.1%
Independent	Jeffrey E. Lemire	1,172	2.8%
Write-in		212	0.5%
Total votes		42,335	100

== 2022 ==
2022 Providence mayoral election
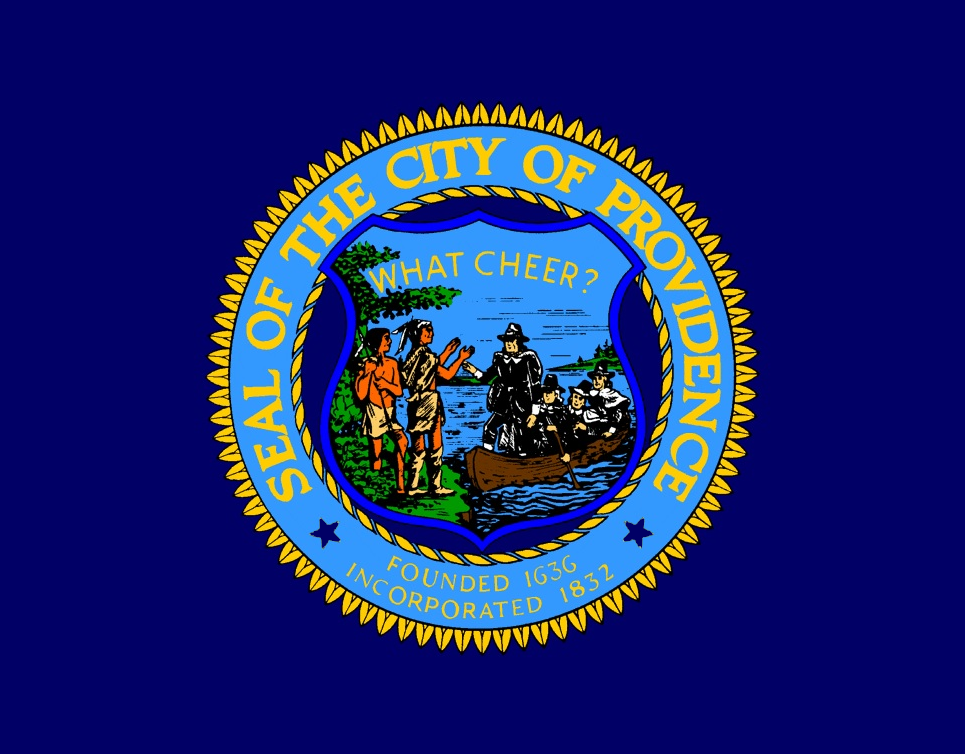
- November 8, 2022
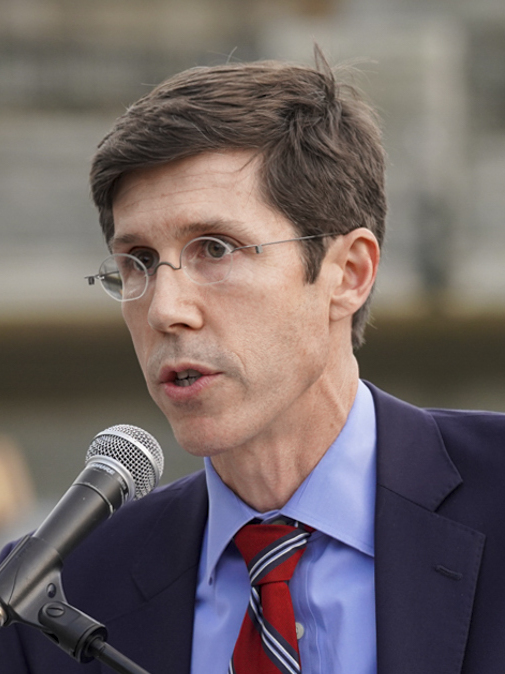
Candidate	Brett Smiley
Party	Democratic
Mayor before election
Jorge Elorza
Democratic
Elected mayor
Brett Smiley
Democratic

The 2022 Providence, Rhode Island mayoral election was held on November 8, 2022.

Since Providence limits mayors to two consecutive terms, incumbent mayor Jorge Elorza, a Democrat, was term-limited and thus could not run for reelection to a third consecutive term in office.

=== Democratic primary ===
==== Candidates ====
===== Nominee =====
- Brett Smiley, former Rhode Island director of administration and 2014 mayoral candidate

===== Eliminated in primary =====
- Gonzalo Cuervo, former deputy secretary of state and former chief of staff to Secretary of State of Rhode Island Nellie Gorbea
- Nirva LaFortune, Providence city councilor

===== Withdrew =====
- Michael Solomon, former Providence City Council president and 2014 mayoral candidate (endorsed Smiley)

===== Declined =====
- Lorne Adrian, businessman and 2014 independent mayoral candidate
- Dylan Conley, candidate for United States House of Representatives in 2020
- Kobi Dennis, community activist and 2018 mayoral candidate
- Grace Diaz, Rhode Island state representative (endorsed Cuervo)
- Raymond Hull, Rhode Island state representative
- John Igliozzi, Providence City Council president
- John J. Lombardi, Rhode Island state representative, former acting mayor, and 2010 mayoral candidate
- David Salvatore, city councilor

==== Endorsements ====
Gonzalo Cuervo

State legislators

- Jose Batista, state representative
- Sam Bell, state senator
- Grace Diaz, state representative
- Maryellen Goodwin, state senator
- Tiara Mack, state senator
- David Morales, state representative
- Ramon Perez, state representative
- Ana Quezada, state senator

Local officials

- Jorge Elorza, mayor of Providence
- Mary Kay Harris, member of the Providence city council from Ward 11
- Kat Kerwin, member of the Providence city council
- Rachel Miller, member of the Providence city council
- Angel Taveras, former mayor of Providence (2011–2015)

Organizations

- Rhode Island Latino PAC

Labor unions

- Brown Graduate Labor Organization
- International Association of Firefighters Local 799
Nirva LaFortune

State legislators

- Rebecca Kislak, state representative
- Marcia Ranglin-Vassell, state representative
- Sam Zurier, state senator

Mayors

- Kim Janey, former acting mayor of Boston

Local officials

- Ruthzee Louijeune, member of the Boston City Council

Organizations

- The Collective PAC
- Democracy for America
- EMILY's list
- Rhode Island Democratic Women's Caucus
- Vote Pro-Choice
Brett Smiley

Statewide officials

- Charles J. Fogarty, former lieutenant governor of Rhode Island (1999–2007)

State legislators

- Edith Ajello, state representative
- Rhoda Perry, former state senator
- Myrth York, former state senator

Local officials

- Michael Correia, Providence city councilman
- JoAnn Ryan, Providence city councilwoman
- Michael Solomon, former Providence city council president and withdrawn candidate in this election
- James Taylor, Providence city councilman
- Oscar Vargas, Providence city councilman from the 15th ward

Organizations

- LGBTQ Victory Fund

==== Debate ====
2022 Providence mayoral election Democratic primary debate
No.	Date	Host	Moderator	Link	Democratic	Democratic	Democratic
Key: P Participant A Absent N Not invited I Invited W Withdrawn							
Key: P Participant A Absent N Not invited I Invited W Withdrawn					Gonzalo Cuervo	Nirva LaFortune	Brett Smiley
1	Aug. 23, 2022	WPRI-TV	Steph Machado; Ted Nesi; Tim White	YouTube	P	P	P

==== Results ====
Democratic primary results
Party	Candidate	Votes	%
Democratic	Brett Smiley	9,025	41.84
Democratic	Gonzalo Cuervo	7,905	35.64
Democratic	Nirva LaFortune	4,643	21.52
Total votes		21,573	100.0%

=== General election ===
==== Results ====
2022 Providence, Rhode Island mayoral election
Party	Candidate	Votes	%
Democratic	Brett Smiley (uncontested)		
Total votes			100.0%

==== External links ====
Official campaign websites

- Gonzalo Cuervo (D) for Mayor
- Nirva LaFortune (D) for Mayor
- Brett Smiley (D) for Mayor
