= Jorge Elorza =

American law professor and mayor of Providence, Rhode Island

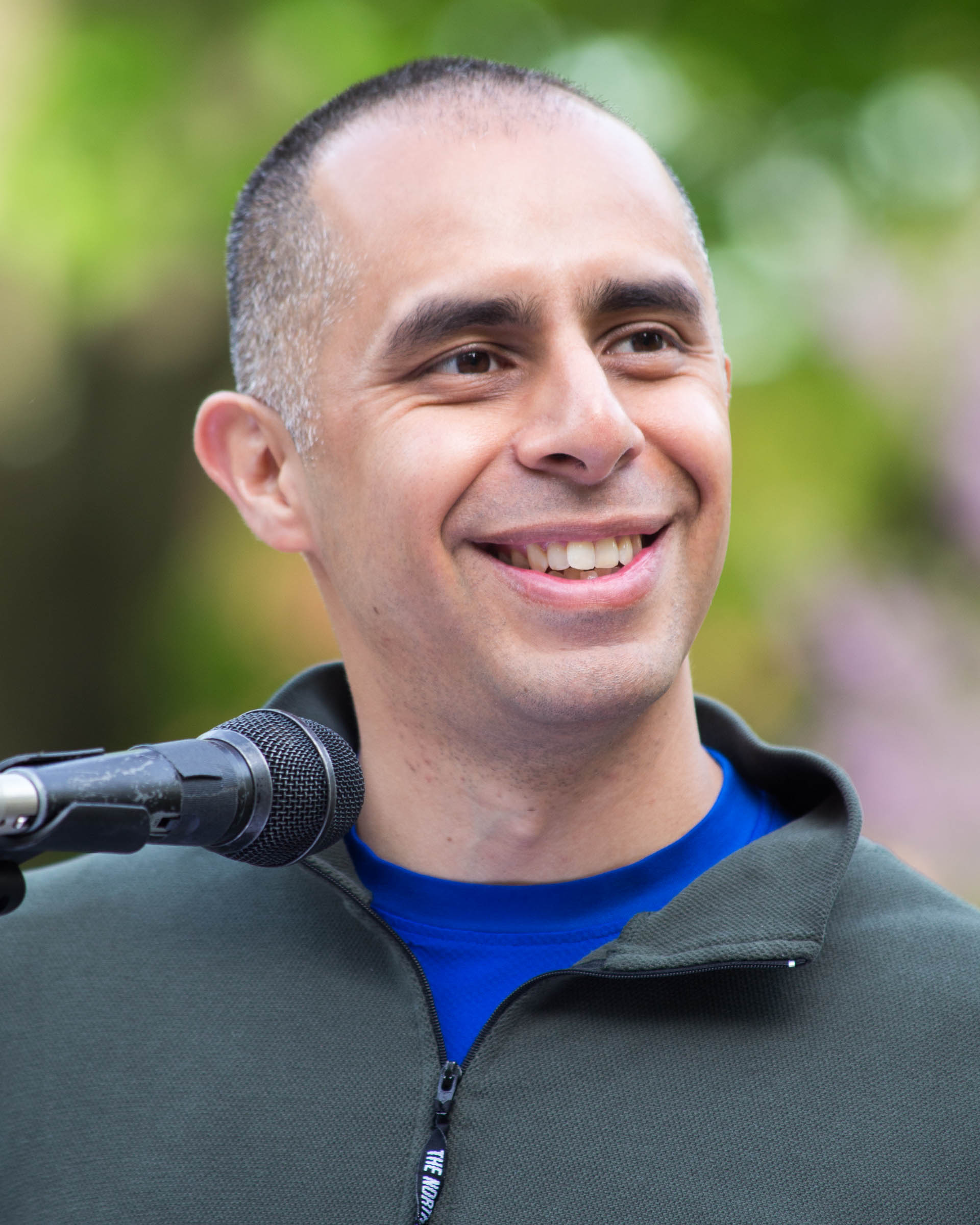
- Elorza in 2015

38th Mayor of Providence
- In office January 5, 2015 – January 2, 2023
- Preceded by: Angel Taveras
- Succeeded by: Brett Smiley

Personal details
- Born: Jorge O. Elorza; November 24, 1976 (age 49) Providence, Rhode Island, U.S.
- Party: Democratic
- Spouse: Stephanie Gonzalez (m. 2019)
- Children: 1
- Education: Community College of Rhode Island (attended); University of Rhode Island, Kingston (BA); Harvard University (JD)

Jorge O. Elorza (born November 24, 1976) is an American law professor who served as the mayor of Providence, Rhode Island from 2015 until 2023. He defeated former mayor Buddy Cianci in the 2014 mayoral election and on January 5, 2015, was sworn in as mayor of the city.

== Early life and education ==
Elorza's parents immigrated from Guatemala in 1975. Jorge Elorza was born and raised in the West End of Providence, Rhode Island. He attended local public schools, including Asa Messer Elementary School, Bridgham Middle School, and Classical High School. The first of his family to attend college, he enrolled at the Community College of Rhode Island before transferring to the University of Rhode Island. He worked as an auditor for PricewaterhouseCoopers in New York, and then attended Harvard Law School, where he graduated with a Juris Doctor.

After the death of a hometown friend, Elorza left Wall Street and returned to Rhode Island. Elorza teaches law at the Roger Williams University School of Law. In 2010 he was appointed to the Providence Housing Court, where he replaced Angel Taveras.

== Mayor of Providence ==
The Providence mayoral race in 2014 was Elorza's first try at elective office. He was sworn in as mayor on January 5, 2015, on the steps of Providence City Hall. In his inaugural speech, Elorza promised to deliver "a city that works".

Early in his first term, Elorza was credited for working closely with the City Council and Governor's office. Within his first 100 days he appointed an "innovation officer" to streamline operations and coordinate city activities. He appointed a representative to the city ethics commission for the first time in nine years. He also reached out to constituents with a "Twitter Town Hall."

During his first year in office, Elorza implemented a complaint response system which generated responses to a backlog of thousands of unanswered complaints to the city. City Hall employees have been required to take customer-service training. New contracts were reached with the City Hall and Public Works and Parks Department unions. A program was set up to take control of abandoned houses, and turn them over to buyers who will fix them. Elorza also created an anti-prostitution effort known as "Operation Backpage", which has arrested several dozen men for solicitation.

On September 12, 2018, Elorza won renomination to the Mayor's office over challengers Kobi Dennis and Robert DeRobbio. He subsequently won the general election.

=== Budget ===
Elorza's government faced a budget shortfall during his first year. However, in October 2016, Elorza announced a $9.5 million budget surplus for the 2015–2016 budget year. This was Providence's largest surplus in at least 20 years. Critics claimed the surplus was partly due to not hiring needed police and firefighters.

=== Firefighters union ===
Elorza faced a long fight with the city's firefighters union over schedule changes. In September 2016, after 13 months of lawsuits, arbitration, and sometimes nasty public exchanges, Elorza and the president of the union finally came to an agreement.

=== Parking meters ===
Elorza presided over an expansion of new, high-tech parking meters in Providence. Between January 2015 and September 2016, Elorza's administration increased the number of metered parking spaces by 50 percent, from 1,400 to 2,100. Critics of the plan say that the meters hurt local business, and that the reduced tax revenue from businesses hurt by the meters is greater than the increased revenue from the parking fees.

=== "One Providence" initiative ===
Following the November 2016 Presidential election, Elorza established the "One Providence" initiative to respond to reports of increased hate crimes against Muslims, LGBTQ people, and minorities in Providence. The initiative includes a new "hotline" to report crime, and the establishment of a Muslim-American advisory board. The initiative was established to "protect and serve every resident of the city" without regard to race, ethnicity, national origin, gender identity, sexual orientation, political affiliation, religion or disability. While the mayor vowed to protect undocumented immigrants from attempts at unfair deportation by the Trump administration, he said he has no plans to establish Providence as a "sanctuary city."

=== Environmental initiatives ===
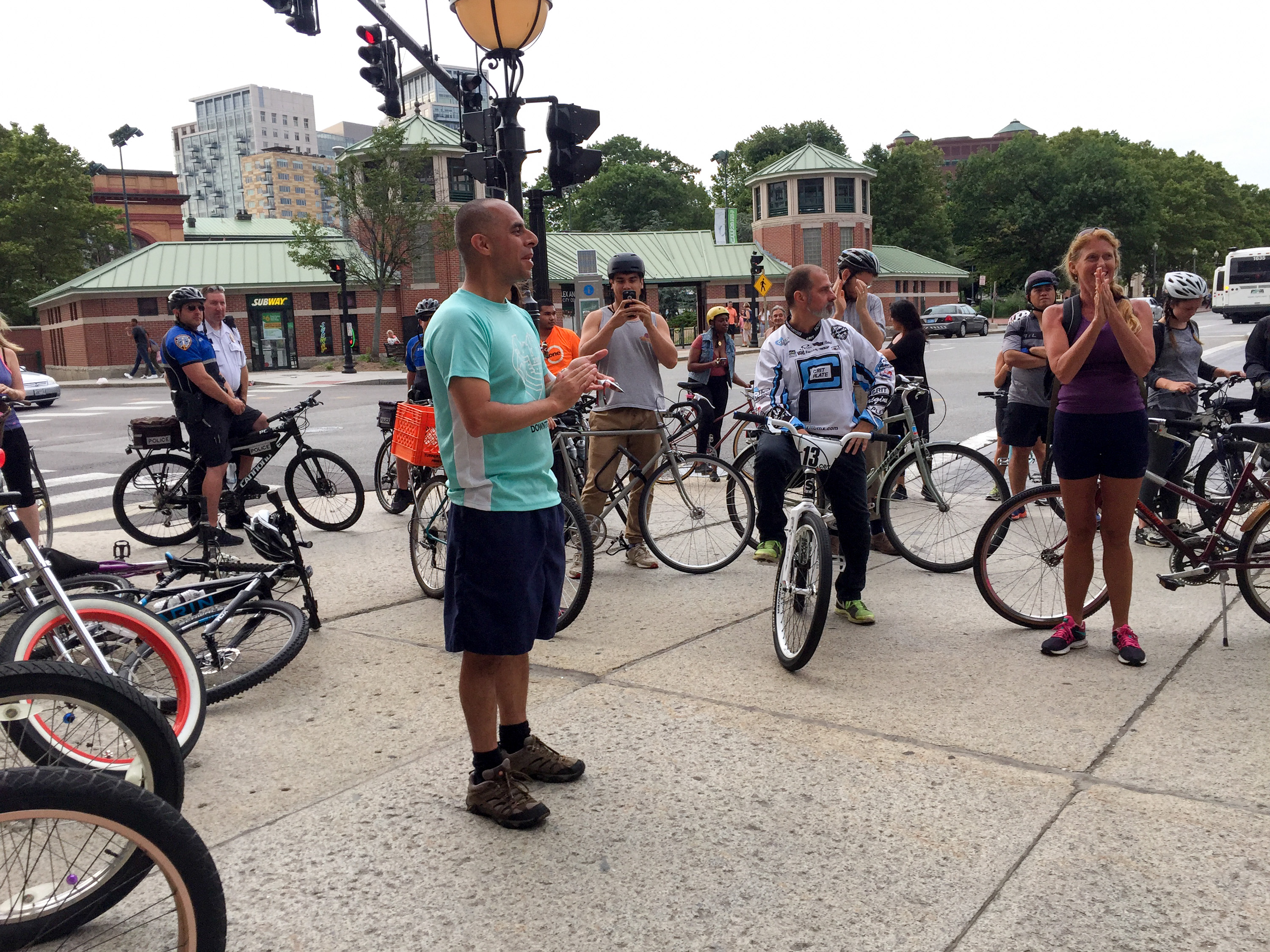
Mayor Elorza addresses riders before the start of his quarterly "Bike the Night" ride through Providence.

In 2016, Elorza set a goal of reaching carbon neutrality by 2050. Elorza is a supporter of improving the city's biking infrastructure, and in 2017 a new greenway opened in Roger Williams Park. Elorza leads a quarterly bicycle ride through Providence called "Bike the Night" to highlight the city's cycling infrastructure.

In 2017, the city signed a $400,000 contract with a private Silicon Valley company to introduce the first bicycle sharing program to the city, supported by local hospitals and RIPTA. Despite the system being popular enough to expand in April 2019, in summer 2019 a new model of bike was introduced with a less secure lock and the price of a ride increased 450%. This led to the bicycles becoming associated with a "wave of vandalism and criminal activity" including widespread thefts of bicycles, bikes tossed into the Providence river, and even a company tech held at gunpoint. The company paused the program in August 2019 and suspended service indefinitely in June 2020.

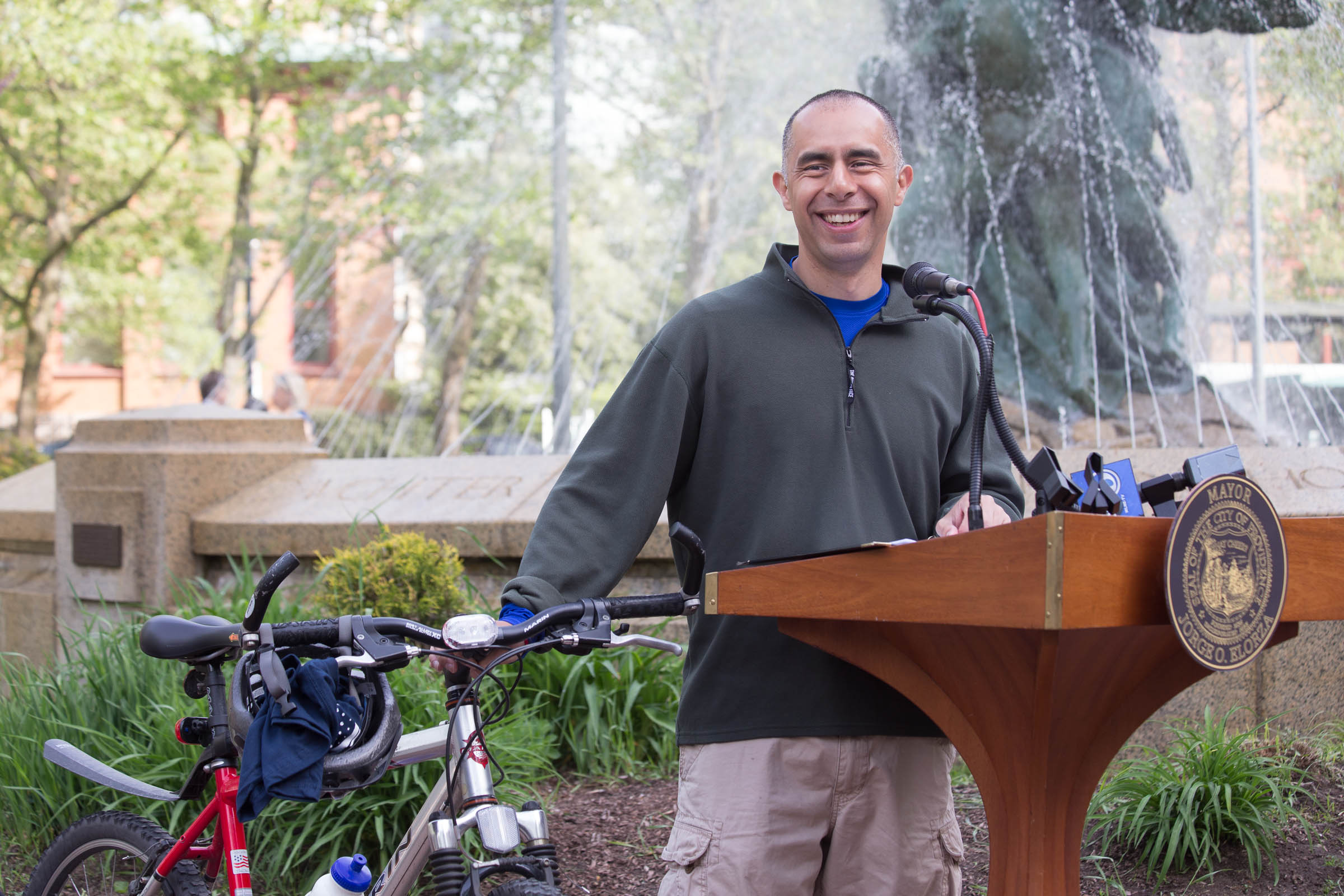
Elorza addresses a Bike-to-Work Day gathering in Burnside Park, May 15, 2015.

In January 2020, Elorza unveiled a "Great Streets" initiative to create a framework of public space improvements to encourage walking, riding bicycles, and public transit. The plan includes establishing an "Urban Trail Network" which includes 60 miles of bicycle paths, bike lanes, and greenways within Providence.

=== Unified Vision plan ===
Elorza's Providence Unified Vision public space project was introduced in July 2021. The plan includes redesigns of Kennedy Plaza and the riverfront. Included in the plan are public rest rooms, walkways, riverfront improvements, green landscaping, a cafe, and performance space.

=== Reparations ===
In July 2020, in response to the Black Lives Matter protests following the murder of George Floyd, Mayor Elorza signed an executive order meant to start a city truth commission, intending to atone for Providence's role in Black slavery, institutional racism, and the mistreatment of Native Americans. In June 2021, Elorza was one of 11 U.S. mayors who formed Mayors Organized for Reparations and Equity (MORE), a coalition of municipal leaders dedicated to starting pilot reparations programs in their cities. In March 2022, Elorza signed an executive order creating the 13-member Providence Municipal Reparations Commission. In August 2022, after receiving the commission's report and recommendations, Mayor Elorza proposed a $10 million reparations spending plan for the city.

== Personal life ==
Elorza is an avid cyclist and fitness enthusiast. He frequently commutes by bicycle from his home in Olneyville to City Hall.

In August 2019, Elorza married Stephanie Gonzalez, a former Central Falls city council member. The pair had a son in June 2018.

After finishing his term as mayor, Elorza was appointed, in 2023, to lead Democrats for Education Reform, a political advocacy organization which focuses on encouraging the Democratic Party to support public education reform and charter schools.

Political offices
Preceded by Angel Taveras	Mayor of Providence; 2015–2023	Succeeded by Brett Smiley
