= Angel Taveras =

American lawyer and politician

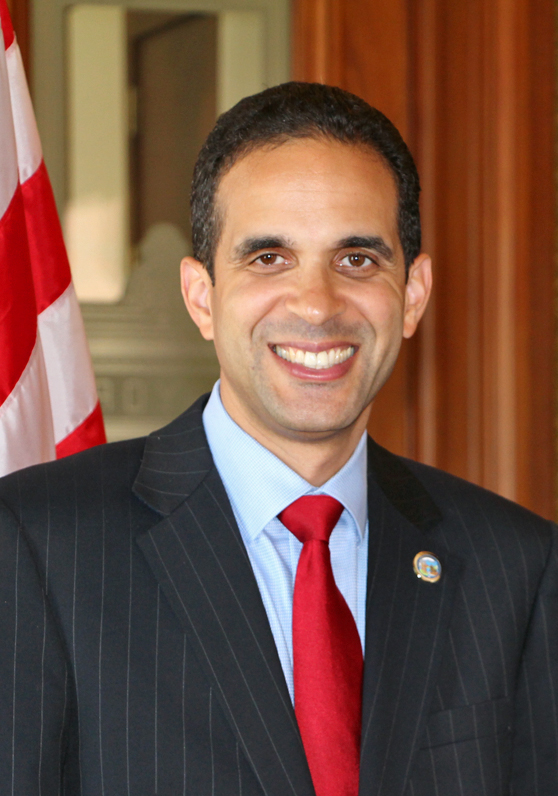

37th Mayor of Providence
- In office January 3, 2011 – January 5, 2015
- Preceded by: David Cicilline
- Succeeded by: Jorge Elorza

Personal details
- Born: August 18, 1970 (age 56) New York City, New York, U.S.
- Party: Democratic
- Spouse: Farah Escamilla (m. 2012)
- Children: 3
- Education: Harvard University (BA); Georgetown University (JD)

Angel Taveras (born August 18, 1970) is an American lawyer and politician who served as the 37th mayor of Providence, Rhode Island, from 2011 to 2015. Taveras was the first Hispanic mayor of the city and the third elected and fourth serving Dominican-American mayor in the United States.

== Early life and education ==
Taveras' parents emigrated from the Dominican Republic in the mid-1960s. Taveras was born in Brooklyn, New York, but his family moved to Providence a few years later. Angel grew up on the South Side of Providence where he attended the Head Start Program and the Providence Public Schools, graduating from Classical High School in 1988, in the same class as future Cranston mayor Allan Fung.

Taveras attended Harvard University as an undergraduate, graduating with honors. Taveras was named an Echoing Green Fellow in 1992 for creating an after-school program and summer camp at Elmwood Community Center. He earned a J.D. degree at Georgetown University, and then served as a lawyer in Providence with Brown Rudnick LLP. After a 2000 Congressional run, Taveras started his own small law firm, focusing on civic advocacy and elections law.

== Political career ==
In 2007, Providence Mayor David Cicilline appointed Taveras an Associate Judge on the Providence Housing Court.

=== Mayor of Providence ===
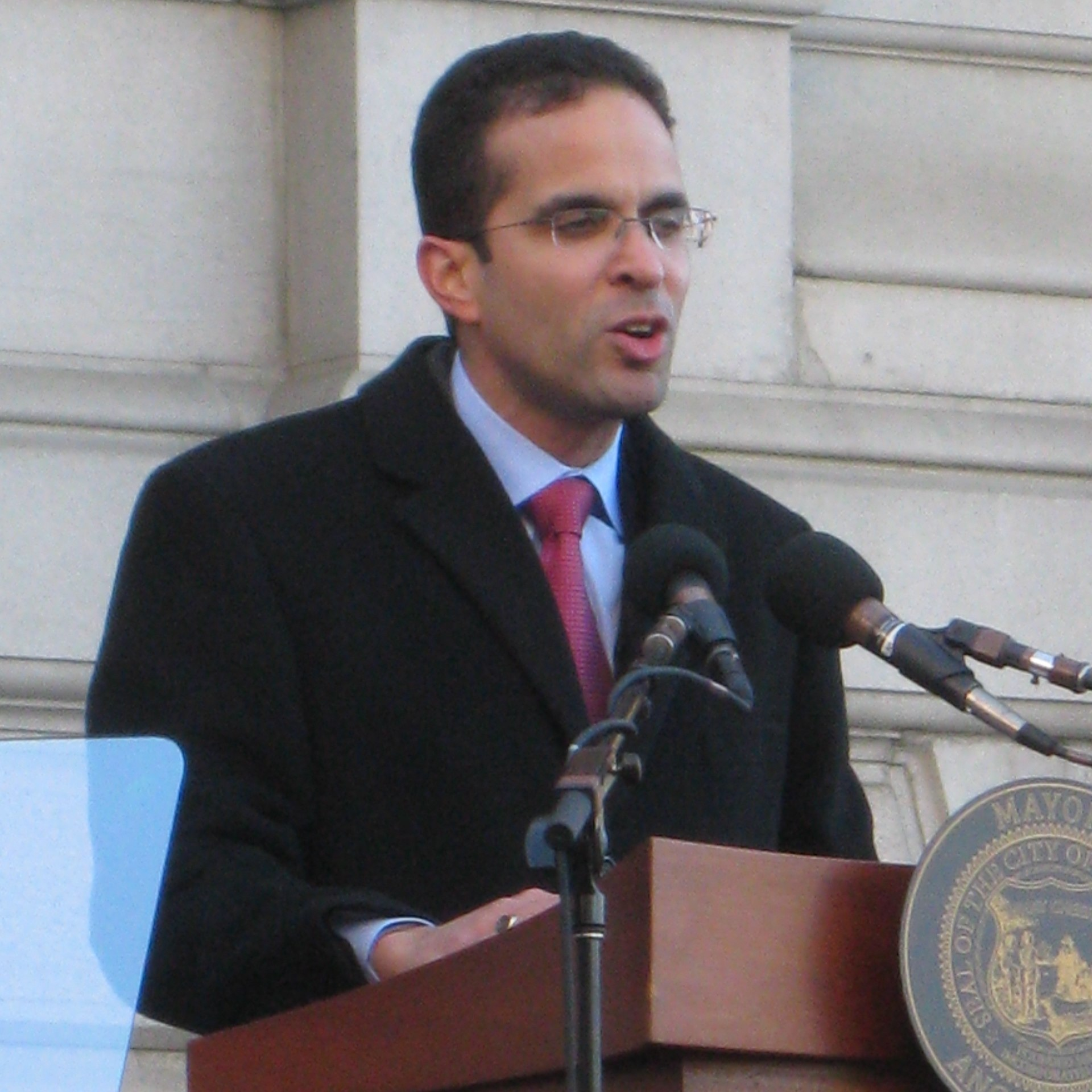
Taveras speaks at his inauguration as Mayor of Providence

In 2010, Taveras stepped down from his judicial position to run for mayor of Providence in that year's mayoral election. In a four-way Democratic primary, Taveras won with 49% of the vote. Angel would go on to win the general election with 82% of the vote, and was sworn in as the 37th mayor of Providence, Rhode Island.

Under Taveras' leadership, Providence was recognized with the All-America City Award from the National Civic League for its plan to boost third grade reading proficiency and the Bloomberg Philanthropies' Mayors Challenge for its innovative proposal to improve the vocabularies of pre-school age children. In 2013, Taveras presided over some of the first same-sex marriages in Rhode Island.

=== "Fiscal hurricane" ===
Taveras came into the mayor's office facing a $110-million deficit. He made various financial agreements with city institutions and won pension concessions from unions to address the city's "fiscal hurricane". Taveras was praised for avoiding filing for bankruptcy in 2012.

=== Education ===
Taveras' term was known for advances in education. He launched Providence Talks, an effort to close the "word gap" by tracking the number of words young children hear at home. The program also offered in-home visits from educators. Monies for the program came from a $5-million grant from the Bloomberg Philanthropies Mayors Challenge. Taveras was also awarded the "Pacesetter Award" for his efforts on early learning from the White House.

=== Gubernatorial run ===
On Oct. 28, 2013, Taveras officially announced his bid for the 2014 gubernatorial election in the Meeting Street School library on Eddy Street in Providence. Taveras was endorsed by the Rhode Island Alliance of Social Service Employees, which represents approximately 900 administrative, technical and social service workers in state government, the International Federation of Professional and Technical Engineers Local 400, which 400 workers in the Rhode Island departments of Transportation and Environmental Management, and Council 94, American Federation of State, County & Municipal Employee, the largest Rhode Island union for public sector employees.

On September 9, 2014, Taveras lost his Democratic primary bid for Rhode Island Governor to RI State Treasurer Gina Raimondo with 35,803 votes out of 122,757 votes cast. Taveras' one term as Mayor of Providence ended in 2015. He was the first elected mayor in 74 years to serve only four years. He was succeeded by Jorge Elorza.

== Personal life ==
In 2012, Taveras married Farah Taveras (née Escamilla). The couple have three children.

Political offices
Preceded by David Cicilline	Mayor of Providence; 2011–2015	Succeeded by Jorge Elorza
