= 2012 United States House of Representatives elections in Rhode Island =

- November 6, 2012

Both Rhode Island seats to the United States House of Representatives
	Majority party	Minority party
Party	Democratic	Republican
Last election	2	0
Seats won	2	0
Seat change	Steady	Steady
Popular vote	232,679	161,926
Percentage	54.39%	37.85%
Swing	▼0.97%	▲0.01%

Democratic
40–50%
50–60%
60–70%
70–80%
Republican
40–50%
50–60%

The 2012 United States House of Representatives elections in Rhode Island were held on Tuesday, November 6, 2012, to elect the two U.S. representatives from the state of Rhode Island, apportioned according to the 2010 United States census. The elections coincided with the elections of other federal and state offices, including a quadrennial presidential election and an election to the U.S. Senate. Primary elections were held on September 11, 2012.

== Overview ==
United States House of Representatives elections in Rhode Island, 2012
Party	Votes	Percentage	Seats before	Seats after	+/–
Democratic	232,679	54.39%	2	2	-
Republican	161,926	37.85%	0	0	-
Independent	32,716	7.65%			-
Write-In	454	0.11%			-
Totals	427,775	100%	2	2	-

== District 1 ==
2012 Rhode Island's 1st congressional district election
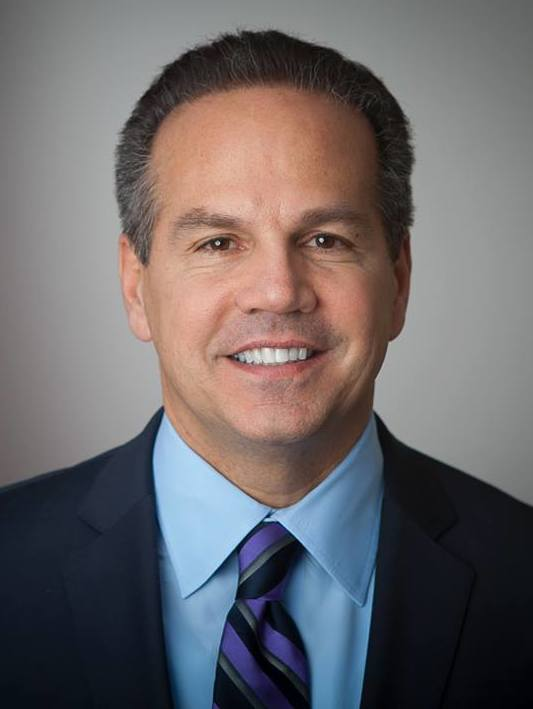

Nominee	David Cicilline	Brendan Doherty	David S. Vogel
Party	Democratic	Republican	Independent
Popular vote	108,612	83,737	12,504
Percentage	53.0%	40.8%	6.1%
- Municipality results Cicilline: 40–50% 50–60% 60–70% 70–80% Doherty: 40–50% 50–60%
U.S. Representative before election
David Cicilline
Democratic
Elected U.S. Representative
David Cicilline
Democratic

The redrawn 1st district represents Barrington, Bristol, Central Falls, Cumberland, East Providence, Jamestown, Lincoln, Little Compton, Middletown, Newport, North Providence, North Smithfield, Pawtucket, Portsmouth, Smithfield, Tiverton, Warren, Woonsocket, and parts of Providence.

Democrat David Cicilline, who had represented the 1st district since January 2011, ran for re-election.

=== Democratic primary ===
==== Candidates ====
===== Nominee =====
- David Cicilline, incumbent U.S. Representative

===== Eliminated in primary =====
- Anthony Gemma, businessman and candidate for this seat in 2010
- Christopher Young, electrical engineer

===== Declined =====
- Bill Lynch, former chair of the Rhode Island Democratic Committee
- Patrick Lynch, former Attorney General of Rhode Island
- Dan McKee, mayor of Cumberland
- David Segal, former state representative
- Merrill Sherman, president and chief executive officer of the Bank of Rhode Island

==== Polling ====
Poll source	Date(s) administered	Sample size	Margin of error	David Cicilline	Anthony Gemma	Undecided
WPRI/Fleming & Associates	May 8–12, 2012	302	± 5.7%	40%	36%	20%

==== Primary results ====
Democratic primary results
Party	Candidate	Votes	%
Democratic	David Cicilline (incumbent)	30,203	62.1
Democratic	Anthony P. Gemma	14,702	30.2
Democratic	Christopher F. Young	3,701	7.6
Total votes		48,606	100.0

=== Republican primary ===
==== Candidates ====
===== Nominee =====
- Brendan Doherty, colonel and the retired superintendent of the Rhode Island State Police

===== Declined =====
- John Loughlin, former state representative and nominee for this seat in 2010

=== General election ===
==== Endorsements ====
Brendan Doherty (R)

Organizations

- National Republican Congressional Committee "Young Guns" Program

==== Debates ====
2012 Rhode Island's 1st congressional district debates
No.	Date	Host	Moderator	Link	Democratic	Republican	Independent
Key: P Participant A Absent N Not invited I Invited W Withdrawn							
Key: P Participant A Absent N Not invited I Invited W Withdrawn					David Cicilline	Brendan Doherty	David Vogel
1	Oct. 17, 2012	WPRI	Tim White	YouTube	P	P	N
2	Nov. 1, 2012	American Democracy Project Rhode Island College Chapter; WJAR-TV	Bill Rappleye		P	P	P

==== Polling ====
Poll source	Date(s) administered	Sample size	Margin of error	David Cicilline (D)	Brendan Doherty (R)	David Vogel (I)	Undecided
WPRI/Fleming & Assoc.	October 24–27, 2012	300 (LV)	± 5.7%	43%	42%	6%	8%
OnMessage, Inc.	October 24–25, 2012	400 (LV)	± 4.9%	39%	45%	6%	10%
Brown University	September 26–October 5, 2012	236 (LV)	± 6.3%	46%	40%	7%	7%
WPRI/Fleming & Assoc.	September 26–29, 2012	501 (LV)	± 6.2%	44%	38%	6%	10%
Feldman (D-Cicilline)	September 13–17, 2012	500 (LV)	± 4.4%	46%	36%	7%	11%
Benenson (D-DCCC)	September 13–16, 2012	400 (LV)	± 4.9%	46%	45%	8%	11%
DCCC (D)	September 10, 2012	578 (LV)	± 5.6%	49%	43%	—	8%
WPRI/Fleming & Assoc.	February 20–23, 2012	250 (RV)	± 6.2%	33%	49%	—	16%
WPRI/Fleming & Assoc.	May 13–15, 2011	300 (RV)	± 5.7%	33%	46%	—	20%

Hypothetical polling

Poll source	Date(s) administered	Sample size	Margin of error	Anthony Gemma (D)	Brendan Doherty (R)	Other	Undecided
WPRI/Fleming & Assoc.	February 20–23, 2012	250	± 6.2%	28%	41%	4%	27%

==== Predictions ====
Source	Ranking	As of
The Cook Political Report	Tossup	November 5, 2012
Rothenberg	Tilt D	November 2, 2012
Roll Call	Tossup	November 4, 2012
Sabato's Crystal Ball	Lean D	November 5, 2012
NY Times	Lean D	November 4, 2012
RCP	Lean D	November 4, 2012
The Hill	Tossup	November 4, 2012

==== Results ====
Rhode Island's 1st congressional district, 2012
Party	Candidate	Votes	%
Democratic	David Cicilline (incumbent)	108,612	53.0
Republican	Brendan Doherty	83,737	40.8
Independent	David S. Vogel	12,504	6.1
n/a	Write-ins	262	0.1
Total votes		205,115	100.0
Democratic hold			

== District 2 ==
2012 Rhode Island's 2nd congressional district election
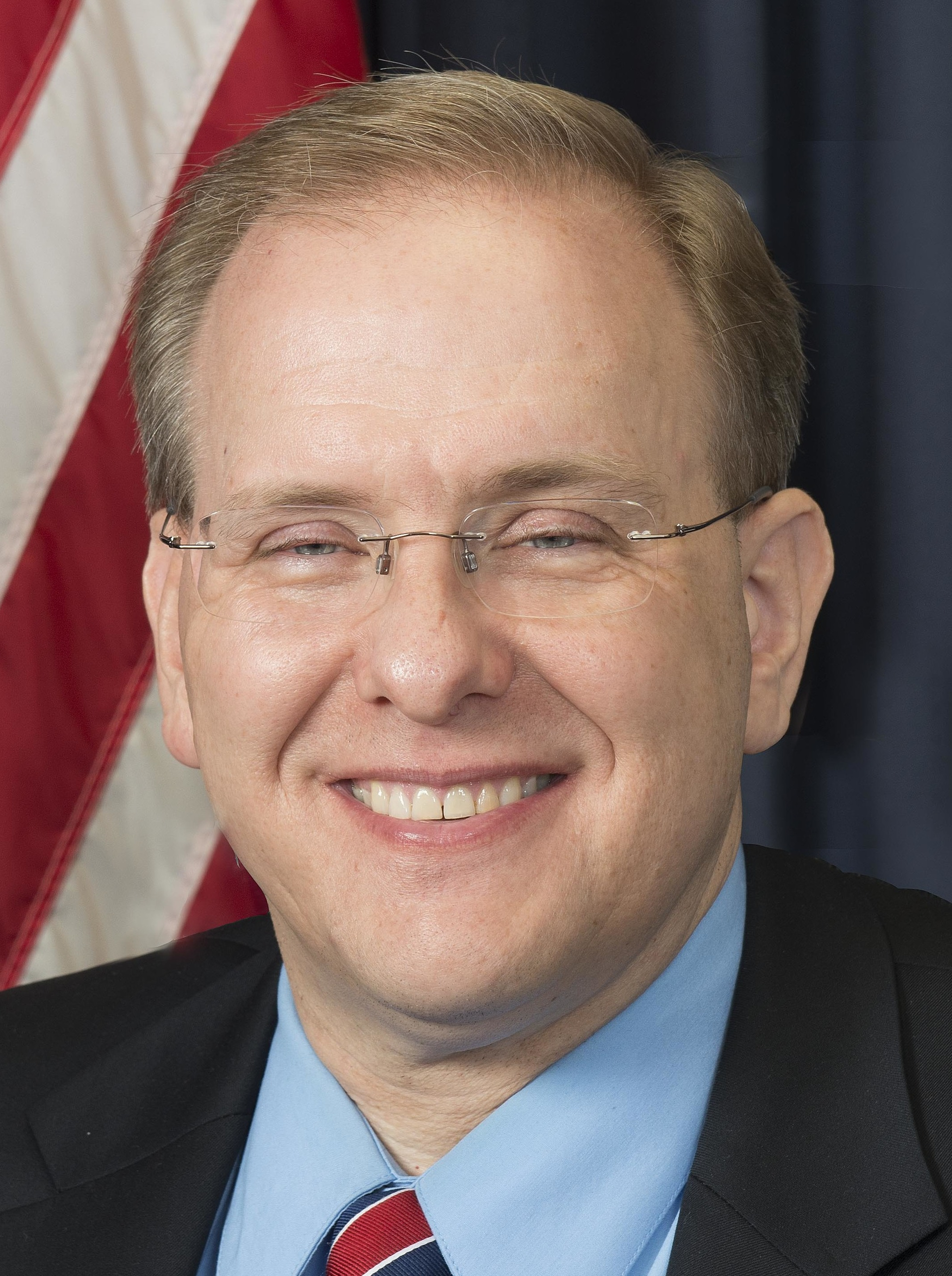

Nominee	James Langevin	Michael G. Riley	Abel G. Collins
Party	Democratic	Republican	Independent
Popular vote	124,067	78,189	20,212
Percentage	55.7%	35.1%	9.1%
- Municipality results Langevin: 40–50% 50–60% 60–70% 70–80% Riley: 40–50%
U.S. Representative before election
James Langevin
Democratic
Elected U.S. Representative
James Langevin
Democratic

The redrawn 2nd district will represent Burrillville, Charlestown, Coventry, Cranston, East Greenwich, Exeter, Foster, Glocester, Hopkinton, Johnston, Narragansett, New Shoreham, North Kingstown, Richmond, Scituate, South Kingstown, Warwick, West Greenwich, West Warwick, Westerly, and parts of Providence.

Democrat James Langevin, who had represented Rhode Island's 2nd congressional district since 2001, ran for re-election.

Abel Collins, an environmental activist, mounted an independent campaign in the general election.

=== Democratic primary ===
==== Candidates ====
===== Nominee =====
- James Langevin, incumbent U.S. Representative

===== Eliminated in primary =====
- John Matson, carpenter and perennial candidate

===== Primary results =====
Democratic primary results
Party	Candidate	Votes	%
Democratic	James Langevin (incumbent)	22,161	74.1
Democratic	John O. Matson	7,748	25.9
Total votes		29,909	100.0

=== Republican primary ===
==== Candidates ====
===== Nominee =====
- Michael Riley, hedge fund manager

===== Eliminated in primary =====
- Michael Gardiner, attorney and candidate for this seat in 2010
- Donald Rubbio
- Kara Russo

===== Primary results =====
Republican primary results
Party	Candidate	Votes	%
Republican	Michael G. Riley	5,283	65.6
Republican	Kara D. Russo	1,488	18.5
Republican	Michael J. Gardiner	825	10.2
Republican	Donald F. Robbio	454	4.6
Total votes		8,050	100.0

=== General election ===
==== Polling ====
Poll source	Date(s) administered	Sample size	Margin of error	Jim Langevin (D)	Michael Riley (R)	Abel Collins (I)	Undecided
WPRI/Fleming & Assoc.	October 24–27, 2012	300	± 5.7%	48%	31%	9%	10%
Aqua Opinion and Policy Research Group	October 5–11, 2012	536	± 4.2%	48%	22%	17%	13%
Brown University	September 26–October 5, 2012	235 (LV)	± 6.3%	49%	32%	5%	14%
WPRI 12	September 26–29, 2012	251	± 6.2%	53%	29%	10%	8%

==== Predictions ====
Source	Ranking	As of
The Cook Political Report	Safe D	November 5, 2012
Rothenberg	Safe D	November 2, 2012
Roll Call	Safe D	November 4, 2012
Sabato's Crystal Ball	Safe D	November 5, 2012
NY Times	Safe D	November 4, 2012
RCP	Safe D	November 4, 2012
The Hill	Safe D	November 4, 2012

==== Results ====
Rhode Island's 2nd congressional district, 2012
Party	Candidate	Votes	%
Democratic	James Langevin (incumbent)	124,067	55.7
Republican	Michael G. Riley	78,189	35.1
Independent	Abel G. Collins	20,212	9.1
n/a	Write-ins	192	0.1
Total votes		222,660	100.0
Democratic hold			
