= 2010 United States House of Representatives elections in Rhode Island =

- November 2, 2010

Both Rhode Island seats to the United States House of Representatives
	Majority party	Minority party
Party	Democratic	Republican
Last election	2	0
Seats won	2	0
Seat change	Steady	Steady
Popular vote	185,711	126,951
Percentage	55.36%	37.84%
Swing	▼13.93%	▲10.74%

Democratic
40–50%
50–60%
60–70%
70–80%
Republican
40–50%
50–60%

The 2010 congressional elections in Rhode Island were held on November 2, 2010, and determined who would represent Rhode Island in the United States House of Representatives. Representatives are elected for two-year terms; the elected served in the 112th Congress from January 3, 2011, until January 3, 2013.

Rhode Island has two seats in the House, apportioned according to the 2000 United States census. Its 2009-2010 congressional delegation consisted of two Democrats, and following the election, it stayed with two Democrats.

== Overview ==
United States House of Representatives elections in Rhode Island, 2010
Party	Votes	Percentage	Seats	+/–
Democratic	185,711	55.36%	2	—
Republican	126,951	37.84%	0	—
Independents	22,822	6.80%	0	—
Totals	335,484	100.00%	2	—

=== By district ===
Results of the 2010 United States House of Representatives elections in Rhode Island by district:

District	Democratic		Republican		Others		Total		Result
District	Votes	%	Votes	%	Votes	%	Votes	%	Result
District 1	81,269	50.53%	71,542	44.49%	8,003	4.98%	160,814	100.0%	Democratic hold
District 2	104,442	59.79%	55,409	31.72%	14,819	8.48%	174,670	100.0%	Democratic hold
Total	185,711	55.36%	126,951	37.84%	22,822	6.80%	335,484	100.0%	

== District 1 ==
2010 Rhode Island's 1st congressional district election
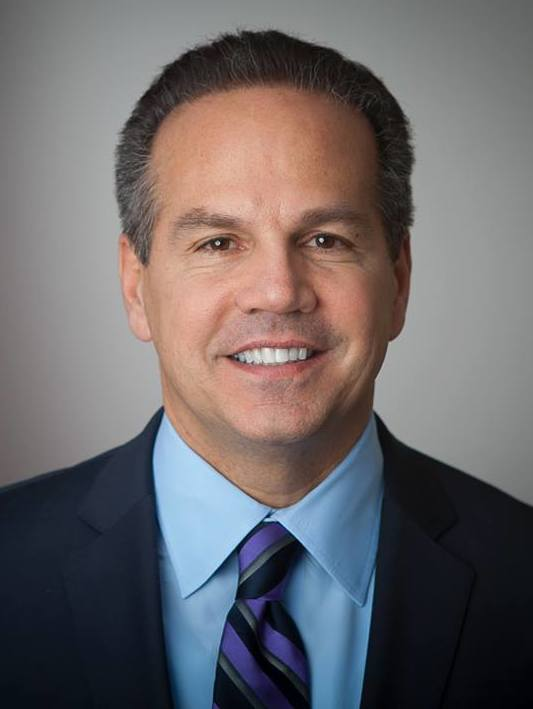

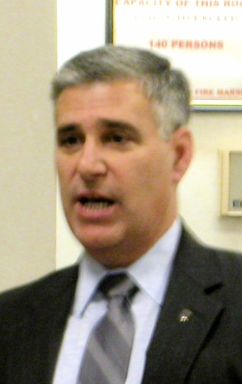
Nominee	David Cicilline	John Loughlin
Party	Democratic	Republican
Popular vote	81,269	71,542
Percentage	50.5%	44.5%
- County results Cicilline: 40–50% 50–60% Loughlin: 40–50%
U.S. Representative before election
Patrick J. Kennedy
Democratic
Elected U.S. Representative
David Cicilline
Democratic

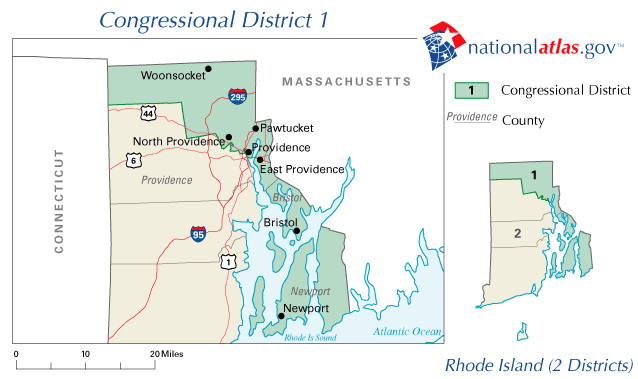

=== Campaign ===
Incumbent Democratic Congressman Patrick J. Kennedy decided not to run for a ninth term in Congress in this solidly liberal district based in northern and eastern Rhode Island, creating an open seat.

David Cicilline, the Mayor of Providence, defeated Anthony Gemma, State Representative David Segal, and former Rhode Island Democratic Party Chairman Bill Lynch in the Democratic primary, while State Representative John Loughlin emerged as the Republican nominee. An aggressive campaign ensued, with Cicilline attacking Loughlin for wanting to privatize Social Security, a claim that Loughlin dismissed as one that "couldn't be further from the truth." Loughlin blasted Cicilline for creating "a $70 million deficit for the next mayor to deal with," which Cicilline attributed to budget cuts made by the Rhode Island General Assembly.

The Providence Journal, praising Cicilline for being "an honest, energetic, and often innovative mayor," and criticizing Loughlin for "reacting...favorably to the collection of fiscal contradictions known as the House Republicans' 'Pledge to America,'" endorsed Cicilline, calling him a "highly competent public servant."

In the end, a surprisingly close race emerged in what should have been an easy win for Cicilline, or any Democratic candidate. Though Cicilline won in the end and was sent to Washington for his first term, it was only by a six-point, 10,000 vote margin of victory.

=== Polling ===
Poll Source	Dates Administered	Democratic nominee	Republican nominee
Poll Source	Dates Administered	David Cicilline	John Loughlin
WJAR Channel 10	October 4–6, 2010	47%	36%
WPRI-TV	October 1–3, 2010	48%	29%
Brown University	September 27–29, 2010	39%	30%
Quest Research	September 15–17, 2010	49%	26%

==== Predictions ====
Source	Ranking	As of
The Cook Political Report	Lean D	November 1, 2010
Rothenberg	Lean D	November 1, 2010
Sabato's Crystal Ball	Lean D	November 1, 2010
RCP	Tossup	November 1, 2010
CQ Politics	Lean D	October 28, 2010
New York Times	Safe D	November 1, 2010
FiveThirtyEight	Likely D	November 1, 2010

=== Results ===
Rhode Island's 1st congressional district election, 2010
Party	Candidate	Votes	%
Democratic	David Cicilline	81,269	50.54
Republican	John Loughlin	71,542	44.49
Independent	Kenneth A. Capalbo	6,424	3.99
Independent	Gregory Raposa	1,334	0.83
Write-ins		245	0.15
Total votes		160,814	100.00
Democratic hold			

== District 2 ==
2010 Rhode Island's 2nd congressional district election
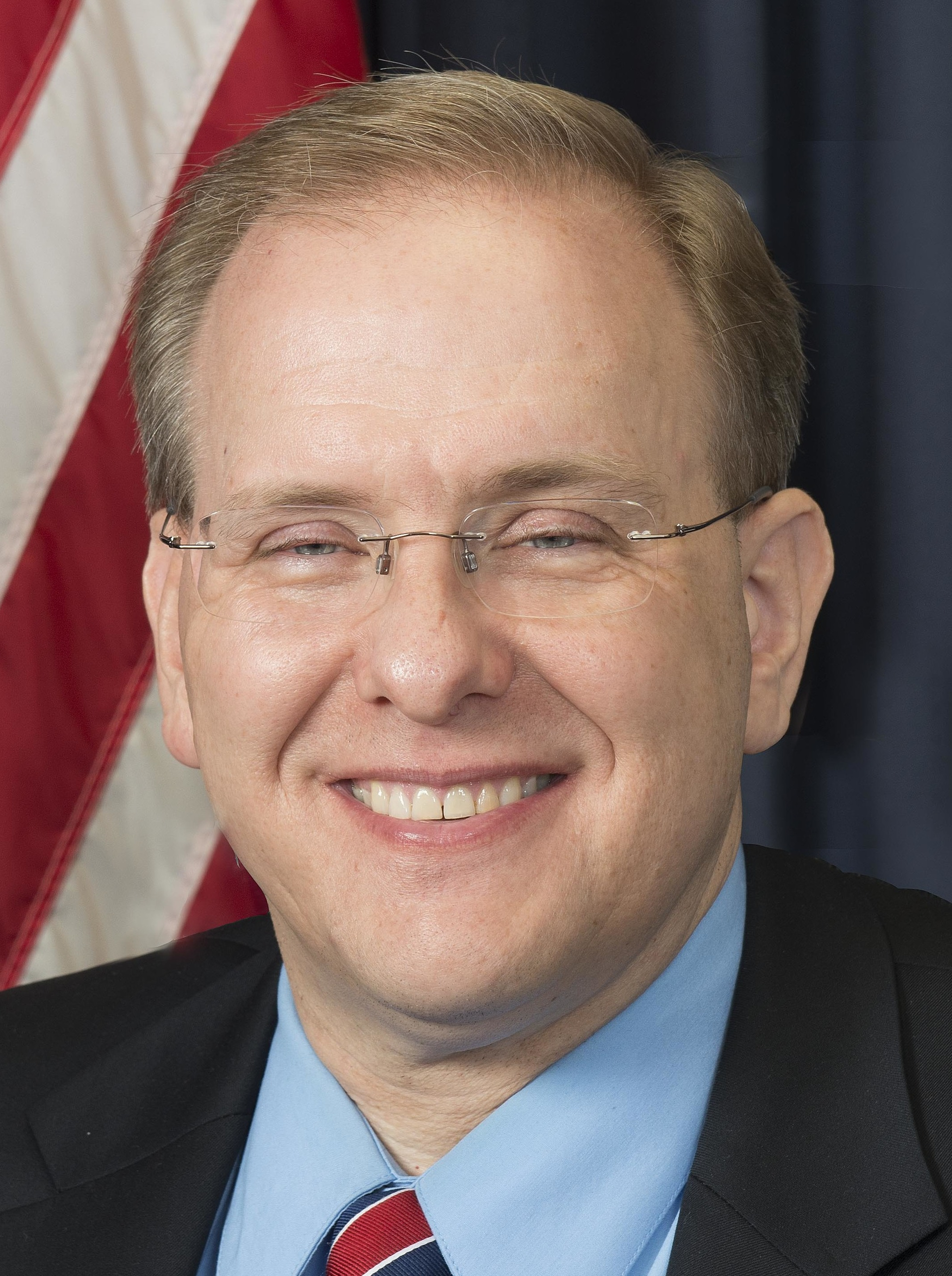

Nominee	James Langevin	Mark S. Zaccaria	John O. Matson
Party	Democratic	Republican	Independent
Popular vote	104,442	55,409	14,584
Percentage	59.8%	31.7%	8.3%
- County results Langevin: 50–60% 60–70%
U.S. Representative before election
James Langevin (inc.)
Democratic
Elected U.S. Representative
James Langevin
Democratic

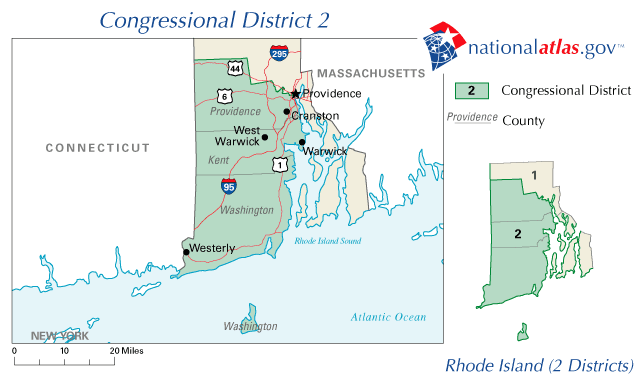

=== Campaign ===
Democratic Congressman James Langevin has represented this liberal district based in southern and western Rhode Island since he was first elected in 2000. Langevin has maintained considerable popularity in this largely supportive constituency, and did not face a real threat to his re-election from his 2008 opponent, Republican Mark Zaccaria. In the general election, Langevin was re-elected by an overwhelming margin, defeating Zaccaria and independent candidate John Matson, who garnered an impressive eight percent of the vote.

=== Polling ===
Poll Source	Dates Administered	Democratic nominee	Republican nominee	Independent candidate
Poll Source	Dates Administered	Jim Langevin	Mark Zaccaria	John Matson
WJAR Channel 10	October 4–6, 2010	65%	26%	3%
WPRI-TV	October 1–3, 2010	54%	24%	—
Brown University	September 27–29, 2010	47%	14%	—
Quest Research	September 15–17, 2010	54%	20%	—

==== Predictions ====
Source	Ranking	As of
The Cook Political Report	Safe D	November 1, 2010
Rothenberg	Safe D	November 1, 2010
Sabato's Crystal Ball	Safe D	November 1, 2010
RCP	Safe D	November 1, 2010
CQ Politics	Safe D	October 28, 2010
New York Times	Safe D	November 1, 2010
FiveThirtyEight	Safe D	November 1, 2010

=== Results ===
Rhode Island's 2nd congressional district election, 2010
Party	Candidate	Votes	%
Democratic	James Langevin (inc.)	104,442	59.79
Republican	Mark S. Zaccaria	55,409	31.72
Independent	John O. Matson	14,584	8.35
Write-ins		235	0.13
Total votes		174,670	100.00
Democratic hold			

Preceded by 2008 elections	United States House of Representatives elections in Rhode Island; 2010	Succeeded by 2012 elections
