= List of law enforcement agencies in Rhode Island =

According to the US Bureau of Justice Statistics' 2008 Census of State and Local Law Enforcement Agencies, the state had 48 law enforcement agencies employing 2,828 sworn police officers, about 268 for each 100,000 residents.

== State agencies ==
- Rhode Island Department of Corrections
- Rhode Island Department of Environmental Management
  - Division of Law Enforcement
- Rhode Island Department of Public Safety
  - Rhode Island State Police
  - Rhode Island Capitol Police
  - Division of Sheriffs
  - Office of the State Fire Marshal
- Rhode Island Office of the Attorney General
  - Bureau of Criminal Identification and Investigation

== Municipal agencies ==
- Barrington Police Department
- Bristol Police Department
- Burrillive Police Department
- Central Falls Police Department
- Charlestown Police Department
- Coventry Police Department
- Cranston Police Department
- Cumberland Police Department
- East Greenwich Police Department
- East Providence Police Department
- Foster Police Department
- Glocester Police Department
- Hopkinton Police Department
- Jamestown Police Department
- Johnston Police Department
- Lincoln Police Department
- Little Compton Police Department
- Middletown Police Department
- Narragansett Police Department
- Newport Police Department
- New Shoreham Police Department
- North Kingstown Police Department
- North Providence Police Department
- North Smithfield Police Department
- Pawtucket Police Department
- Portsmouth Police Department
- Providence Police Department
- Richmond Police Department
- Scituate Police Department
- Smithfield Police Department
- South Kingstown Police Department
- Tiverton Police Department
- Warren Police Department
- Warwick Police Department
- West Greenwich Police Department
- West Warwick Police Department
- Westerly Police Department
- Woonsocket Police Department

== College and university agencies ==
- Brown University Department of Public Safety
- Bryant University Department of Public Safety
- Community College of Rhode Island Police Department
- Providence College Office of Public Safety
- Rhode Island College Campus Police Department
- University of Rhode Island Police Department

== Other agencies ==
- Narragansett Indian Tribe Environmental Police Department
- Narragansett Tribal Police Department
- Rhode Island Airport Police
