= David Cicilline =

American lawyer and politician (born 1961)

Dave Cicilline
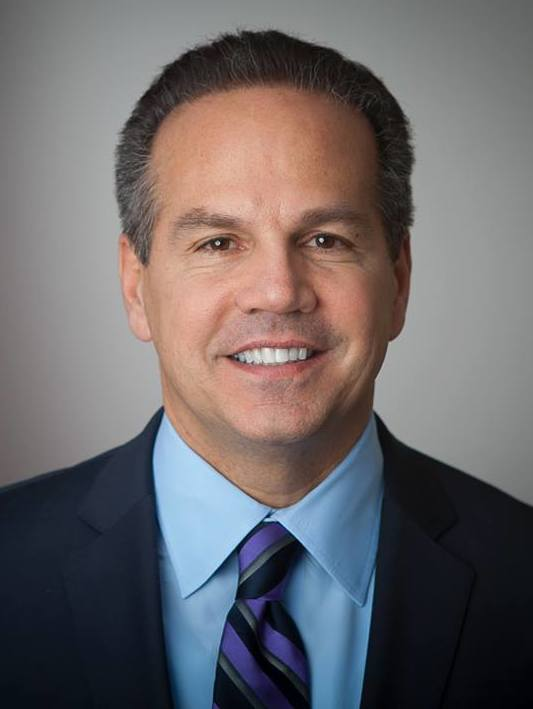
- Official portrait, 2015

Chair of the House Democratic Policy and Communications Committee
- In office January 3, 2019 – January 3, 2021
- Leader: Nancy Pelosi
- Preceded by: Himself; Cheri Bustos; Hakeem Jeffries
- Succeeded by: Joe Neguse

Co-Chair of the House Democratic Policy and Communications Committee
- In office January 3, 2017 – January 3, 2019 Serving with Cheri Bustos and Hakeem Jeffries
- Leader: Nancy Pelosi
- Preceded by: Steve Israel
- Succeeded by: Matt Cartwright; Debbie Dingell; Ted Lieu

Member of the U.S. House of Representatives from Rhode Island's 1st district
- In office January 3, 2011 – May 31, 2023
- Preceded by: Patrick Kennedy
- Succeeded by: Gabe Amo

36th Mayor of Providence
- In office January 6, 2003 – January 3, 2011
- Preceded by: John Lombardi
- Succeeded by: Angel Taveras

Member of the Rhode Island House of Representatives from the 4th district
- In office January 3, 1995 – January 6, 2003
- Preceded by: Linda Kushner
- Succeeded by: Gordon Fox

Personal details
- Born: David Nicola Cicilline; July 15, 1961 (age 65) Providence, Rhode Island, U.S.
- Party: Democratic
- Education: Brown University (BA); Georgetown University (JD)
- Cicilline's voice Cicilline supporting the Respect for Marriage Act. Recorded December 8, 2022

David Nicola Cicilline (/sɪsɪˈliːni/ sih-sih-LEE-nee; born July 15, 1961) is an American lawyer and politician who served as the U.S. representative for Rhode Island's 1st congressional district from 2011 to 2023. A member of the Democratic Party, he was the 36th mayor of Providence from 2003 to 2011, the first openly gay mayor of a U.S. state capital.

Cicilline chaired the House Judiciary Committee's Subcommittee on Antitrust, Commercial and Administrative Law. In this role, he has supported efforts to modernize antitrust law. On September 29, 2022, he was elected chair of the House Middle East, North Africa, and Global Counterterrorism subcommittee, succeeding Ted Deutch, who resigned from the House on September 30, 2022. In November 2022, Cicilline announced he would run against outgoing Majority Whip Leader Jim Clyburn as Assistant Democratic Leader, the fourth senior position in the Democratic House caucus. Cicilline later dropped his bid for assistant minority leader.

In February 2023, Cicilline announced his resignation from Congress, effective June 1, 2023, to become president and chief executive officer of the Rhode Island Foundation.

== Early life, education, and legal career ==
Cicilline was born July 15, 1961, in Providence, Rhode Island. His mother, Sabra (née Peskin), is Jewish, and his father, John Francis "Jack" Cicilline, is Italian American and Catholic. His father was a prominent attorney in Providence who defended local Mafia figures in the 1970s and 1980s, and was an aide to Mayor Joseph A. Doorley Jr.

He was raised in Providence before moving to Narragansett. In high school, he served as president of his graduating class, and participated in the Close Up Washington civic education program before attending Brown University, where he established a branch of the College Democrats with his classmate John F. Kennedy Jr. He graduated magna cum laude with a degree in political science in 1983. He then went to Georgetown University Law Center, where he earned a J.D.

He remained in Washington, D.C. for a while to work as a lawyer at the Public Defender Service for the District of Columbia.

In 1992, he ran for the Rhode Island Senate against incumbent senator Rhoda Perry, but lost the Democratic primary. Two years later, he was elected to the Rhode Island House of Representatives, representing the 4th district on Providence's East Side.

== Rhode Island House of Representatives (1995–2003) ==
=== Elections ===
1994

He won the Democratic primary to succeed retiring Rep. Linda J. Kushner with 56% of the vote, and was unopposed in the general election.

1996

In 1996, Cicilline ran unopposed in the Democratic primary for Rhode Island House of Representatives District 4. He defeated his Republican opponent, Michael L. Schein, in the general election with 2,851 votes to Schein's 1,642.

1998

In 1998, Cicilline ran unopposed in the Democratic primary. He also ran unopposed in the general election.

2000

Cicilline ran unopposed for the third time in the Democratic primary in 2000. For the second time, he ran unopposed in the general election.

== Mayor of Providence (2003–2011) ==
=== Elections ===
2002

Cicilline defeated Joseph R. Paolino, Jr, Keven A. McKenna, and David V. Igliozzi in the Democratic primary.

In November 2002, Cicilline was elected in a landslide with 84% of the vote, following the downfall of controversial mayor Buddy Cianci and the aftermath of Operation Plunder Dome. He succeeded acting mayor John J. Lombardi, who served out Cianci's term and decided not to run in the 2002 election.

2006

In 2006, Cicilline defeated Christopher F. Young in the Democratic primary. He went on to win an easy reelection with 83% of the vote.

=== Tenure ===
Approval ratings

A Brown University survey from September 2007 found that 64% of state residents approved of the job Cicilline was doing in Providence. By February 2008, that number had dropped to 51%. In September 2008, his popularity fell to 46%.

Affiliations

Cicilline was the 2008 President of the National Conference of Democratic Mayors. As mayor, he was a member of the Mayors Against Illegal Guns Coalition, a bipartisan group with the stated goal of "making the public safer by getting illegal guns off the streets". Boston Mayor Thomas Menino and New York City Mayor Michael Bloomberg co-chaired the Coalition.

In 2009, Cicilline served as one of six selection committee members for the Rudy Bruner Award for Urban Excellence.

Focus

Cicilline's administration focused on the residential neighborhoods of Providence, as well as the "Renaissance" areas of downtown and Federal Hill that thrived under Cianci, and continued the promotion of the city via the tax breaks given to artists and movie productions. A former state legislator, he overcame the animosity between state and city government that had existed under Cianci.

Student head tax

In May 2009, Cicilline gained national headlines after proposing a $150 per semester Head Tax on each of the 25,000 college students attending four universities in the city. The tax was an effort to close $6–$8 million of a reported $17 million city budget shortfall. The Associated Press reported that if enacted, it would become the first-in-the-nation tax on students simply for being enrolled and attending college within the city limits.

Environment

Cicilline has expressed concern about the Providence metropolitan area's carbon footprint. As mayor, he sought to implement a streetcar/light rail-type system for the city. He also focused efforts to fight poverty. He won passage of a vacant-and-abandoned property penalty, to provide an economic disincentive for banks to keep properties off the housing market for extended periods of time. He also proposed municipal bonds for the purpose of buying foreclosed properties to expand housing.

After school programs

Cicilline is a strong proponent of after-school activities as a means of improving opportunities for children. As mayor, Cicilline served as Chair of the Standing Committee for Children, Health and Human Services of the United States Conference of Mayors. He has also been recognized for his efforts to establish youth programming and to strengthen ties among schools, businesses and local government, in order to expand access to after-school programming. Under Cicilline, city officials worked with Rhode Island's Education Partnership to form PASA, the Providence After School Alliance. Cicilline also serves on the board of the national nonprofit Afterschool Alliance, an organization that works to promote and to support after-school activities for all children.

Prostitution

Between 1980 and 2009, most prostitution was legal in Rhode Island. As mayor, Cicilline was a strong advocate for outlawing it. Cicilline personally testified in Superior Court to stop the opening of "spas" in Providence, and discussed his position in the 2009 documentary Happy Endings?. He lobbied for a prostitution law—not only to arrest sex workers and their customers, but also to fine landlords that permitted prostitution on their premises. On September 2, 2009, Cicilline submitted an ordinance to the City Council to ban indoor prostitution in the city, imposing a $500 fine and a potential 30-day prison sentence on violators. On November 3, 2009, Rhode Island Governor Donald Carcieri signed into law a bill making the buying and selling of sexual services a crime.

Democratic presidential primaries

During the 2008 Democratic primaries, Cicilline supported Hillary Clinton. In August 2008, he attended the Democratic National Convention in Denver. While there, he told an interviewer that he now supported Barack Obama, saying "[t]here is a real sense of hope and optimism about what we're about to do, and about a change in leadership in this country”.

=== Controversies ===
ICE controversy with Governor Carcieri

On June 8, 2008, Marco Riz, an undocumented immigrant from Guatemala who had been arrested twice the previous year while under a deportation order, was charged with the robbery and rape of a 30-year-old woman. A federal Immigration and Customs Enforcement (ICE) agent criticized the Providence Police Department for not checking Riz's immigration status at the time of his previous arrest. The governor of Rhode Island, Donald Carcieri, blamed Cicilline for the department's failure. Previously, Carcieri had signed an executive order requiring all state officials to work with ICE on arrests or hirings of undocumented immigrants. When Carcieri asked the same of local agents, Providence Police Chief Dean Esserman refused. Cicilline responded that it has been the policy of the Police Department to work with ICE and its database on all arrests, that the policy had been followed when Riz was arrested, and that the ICE had failed to act.

On July 8, 2008, Rhode Island Governor Donald Carcieri claimed that Cicilline was not upholding his oath of office by failing to report undocumented immigrants, and suggested that the U.S. Attorney investigate the mayor. Mayor Cicilline responded by accusing Carcieri of "playing politics". Eight days later, Cicilline wrote an op-ed in The Providence Journal, stating that the city always has and will continue to report all arrests to immigration authorities, and that the focus is therefore inappropriate.

Firefighters' union contract arbitration

Beginning in 2003, Cicilline was engaged in a dispute with the Providence Firefighters labor union, Local 799. In a July 2002 email Cicilline sent to the members of Local 799, he indicated that he hoped to resolve their pending contract dispute with the city within 30 days of taking office. In August, Cicilline said in an interview that it was impossible for him to promise to bring the contract negotiations to a successful conclusion, owing to the unpredictability of his negotiating partners. The city and the union had been in arbitration in every contract year since 2002, with Cicilline appealing one arbitration decision to the Rhode Island Supreme Court. The appeal was rejected.

In 2004, Democratic vice presidential nominee John Edwards canceled a fundraising appearance in Providence in support of the Local 799. In 2007, Hillary Clinton asked Cicilline, a Clinton supporter, not to attend a Clinton rally, because of threats by the union to picket the appearance.

Both the Rhode Island AFL-CIO and the International Association of Fire Fighters (IAFF) censured Cicilline for his conduct in this matter. In 2009, due to the union picketline, the Obama administration canceled Joe Biden's appearance at the U.S. Conference of Mayors in Providence, in the interests of remaining neutral in the conflict.

Tax office controversy

In June 2008, John M. Cicilline, brother of Mayor Cicilline, pleaded guilty to conspiracy, obstruction of justice, and making false statements for his role in the courthouse corruption scheme. Federal prosecutors indicted John M. Cicilline, disbarred attorney Joseph Bevilacqua Jr., and two assistants in January 2007. According to court documents, the two attorneys spun a complicated scheme to win leniency in a drug trafficking case.

Before reporting to prison, John M. Cicilline gave the city of Providence a $75,000 check for taxes owed by a client, but asked that the check not be cashed, and only held as collateral. Two of the mayor's top aides told the city tax collector, Robert Ceprano, not to cash the check because it would bounce. In four instances, Ceprano said mayoral aides pressured him to perform tax favors for the mayor's friends and/or campaign contributors. The mayor claimed the taxpayers had been given relief because the city had made errors on their taxes, not because they were his friends or contributors. During the controversy, Ceprano was fired.

On May 10, 2009, Robert Ceprano filed a lawsuit against the City of Providence, alleging conspiracy, corruption, libel, and wrongful termination. The suit accused John M. Cicilline, the mayor's imprisoned brother, of attempting to defraud the City of Providence by writing a bad check for $75,000 on behalf of a delinquent taxpayer. Furthermore, it alleged the mayor and his aides "willfully conspired...to conceal John M. Cicilline's illegal activities". Ceprano also charged that he was fired not for poor job performance, but because he resisted the mayor's efforts to perform tax favors for political friends and supporters. Lawyers for Ceprano asked for $10 million. Judge Kristin Rodgers dismissed the single-count complaint against John M. Cicilline on November 17, 2009.

Budget controversy

Shortly after assuming office, Cicilline's successor as the Mayor of the City of Providence, Angel Taveras, announced that the city was facing a "category 5" hurricane due to its substantial debt. Tavares made budget cuts, including teacher layoffs and paycuts for city employees. The total structural debt inherited by Tavares in 2011 was $180 million.

A report commissioned by the City of Providence found that the Cicilline administration had transferred funds from the Undesignated Surplus (the city's cash reserves) without the proper approval of the City Council, had not provided financial information on a timely basis to the independent auditor, the City Council, or the Internal Auditor, and had not provided the City Council with monthly financial statements, or with projections of year-end surpluses or deficits, among other findings. Providence City Council Finance Chairman John Igliozzi accused him of "hiding the scope of the city's fiscal woes through 'illusory revenues, borrowing, and other tricks.'"

Fitch Ratings also downgraded Providence's ratings, citing "imprudent budgeting decisions, and failure to implement recurring budget solutions". Cicilline, who portrayed himself as a reformer looking to restore transparency to City Hall, was criticized by his opponents from the primary and House elections; Democrat Anthony Gemma said that he felt Cicilline had lied his way to federal office, and Republican John Loughlin said, "You just don't lie to people in such a transparent way".

A year later, it was reported that Providence could be on the brink of bankruptcy. Former Mayor Cianci placed much of the blame on Cicilline for Providence's problems, saying that although he didn't think it was entirely his fault, he did hide it from the public. Experts have said that the only way out for Providence may be to declare bankruptcy.

== U.S. House of Representatives (2011–2023) ==
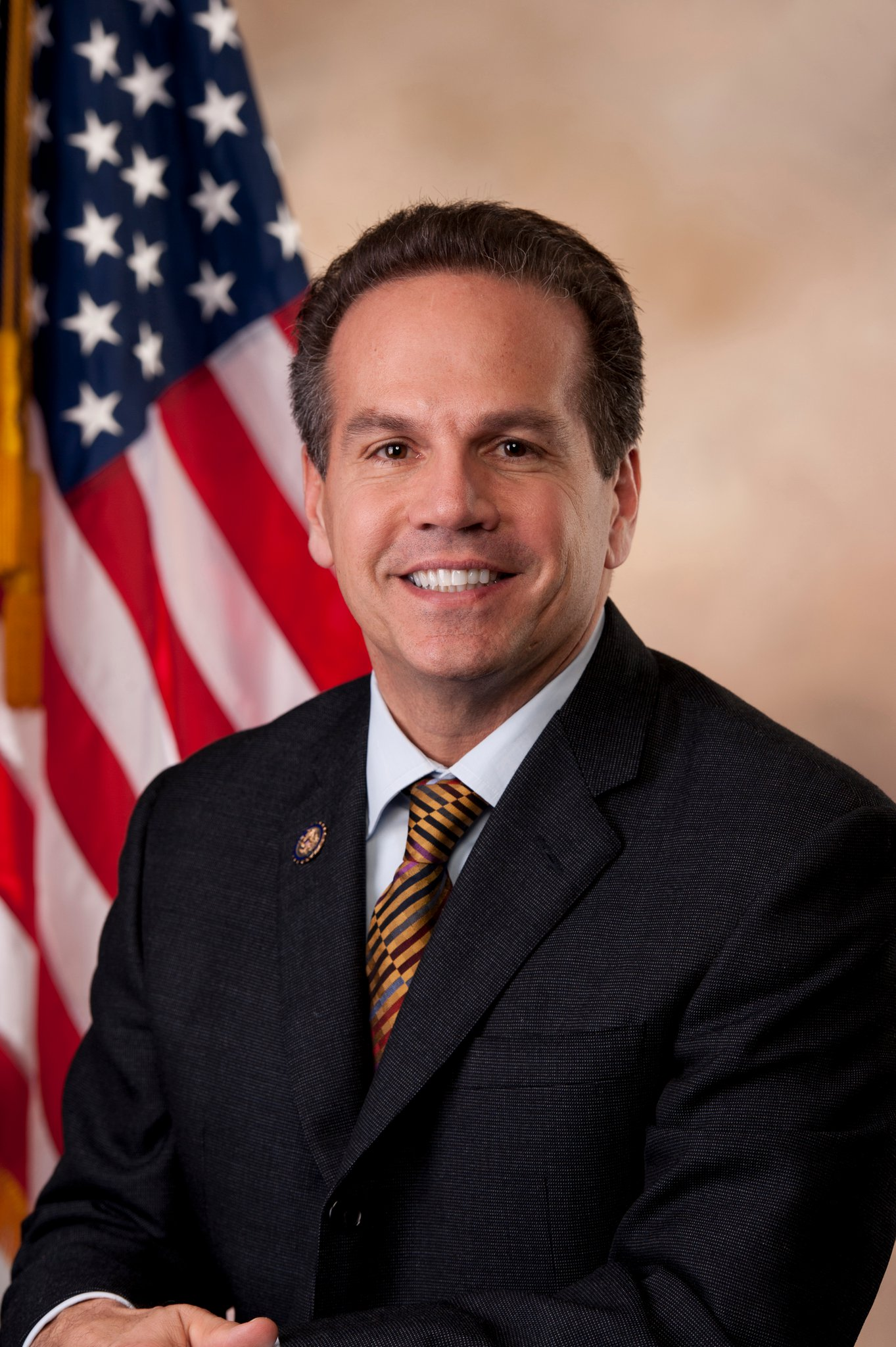
Cicilline's official 112th Congress portrait

=== Elections ===
==== 2010 ====
On February 13, 2010, Cicilline announced his candidacy for the U.S. House of Representatives, following the retirement of Patrick J. Kennedy. He won the Democratic primary in September with 37% of the vote, defeating businessman Anthony Gemma (23%), State Representative David Segal (20%), and state party chairman Bill Lynch (20%).

In November, he defeated Republican State Representative John Loughlin with 51% of the vote.

==== 2012 ====
He ran for re-election in the newly redrawn 1st district, and won. He beat out former Rhode Island State Police Superintendent Brendan Doherty with 53% of the total votes cast.

A February 2012 survey showed Cicilline's approval rating had dropped almost 10% in 3 months, with the percentage of those who rated his performance as "excellent or good" dropping by 24%. Anthony Gemma, Cicilline's primary opponent, said that the poll clearly showed that “a majority of Rhode Islanders wanted to see Cicilline go.”

In 2011, it was reported that although Rhode Island had experienced a population shift of only 7,200, a new congressional map would put 125,000 Rhode Islanders into new districts, which would help Democrats—and notably Cicilline. Fellow House Democrat Jim Langevin accused Cicilline of trying to use the redistricting to aid with his reelection campaign. Potential Republican contenders suggested that it was an attempt to save Cicilline after his approval numbers had dropped. Cicilline rebuffed the allegations, and asserted that he did not attempt to influence the redistricting.

==== 2014 ====
In 2014, Cicilline defeated his Democratic primary opponent, Matthew Fecteau, with 62.98% of the vote. In the general election, he was reelected to a third term, defeating Republican nominee Cormick Lynch with 59% of the vote.

==== 2016 ====
Cicilline was reelected to a fourth term, defeating Republican nominee H. Russell Taub with 64% of the vote.

==== 2018 ====
Cicilline ran in the primary election against Christopher Young. During the campaign, both Young and Cicilline's Republican opponent, Patrick Donovan, criticized Cicilline's behavior at the hearing of Peter Strzok. Young said that Cicilline was "screaming like a lunatic". Donovan said, "What Mr. Cicilline did in the hearing was childish. To be yelling like that is not part of what he's supposed to be doing representing our interests down in Washington." Cicilline defeated Young in the primary election with 78% of the vote.

In September, Cicilline stated that if Democrats became the majority party in the House, he would run for assistant Democratic leader. For his work on the Assault Weapons Ban he had introduced to the House, The Newtown Action Alliance endorsed Cicilline in the 2018 election.

Cicilline won the general election, defeating Republican nominee Patrick Donovan with 66.6% of the vote.

==== 2020 ====
Cicilline ran unopposed in the 2020 Democratic primary election. In the general election, he received 70.8% of the vote, defeating the two independent candidates, Frederick Wysocki and Jeffery Edward Lemire, who earned 15.8% and 12.6%, respectively.

==== 2022 ====
Cicilline again ran unopposed in the 2022 Democratic primary election.

Cicilline won the general election, defeating Republican nominee Allen Waters with 64% of the vote.

=== Tenure ===
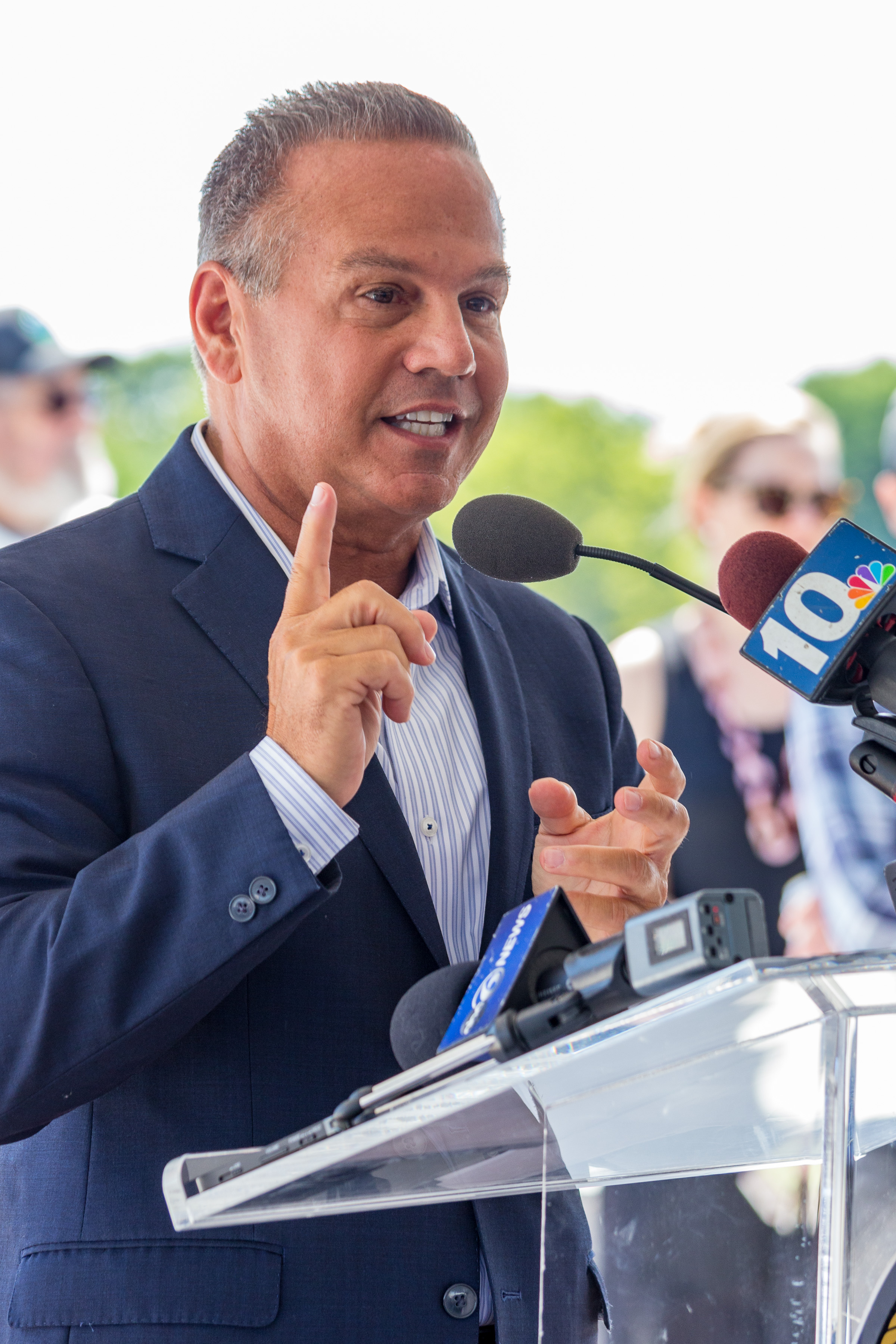
David Cicilline at the opening ceremony for the Michael S. Van Leesten Memorial Bridge in 2019

Upon being sworn in, Cicilline became the fourth openly gay member of Congress.

Cicilline has voted with his party 96% of the time. He has been called a "populist-leaning liberal". Since 2016, he has served as a co-chair of the Policy and Communications Committee. He has been described as a "rising star" in the Democratic Party. The Democratic Caucus elected Cicilline chair of the Democratic Policy and Communications Committee after he dropped out of the race to become assistant Democratic leader. As chair of the DPCC, Cicilline will be in charge of the caucus' messaging strategy.

Cicilline voted for both articles of impeachment against President Donald Trump.

On January 12, 2021, Cicilline was named an impeachment manager (prosecutor) for Trump's second impeachment trial.

In October 2021, Portuguese Ambassador to the United States Domingos Teixeira de Abreu Fezas Vital made Cicilline a Grand Officer of the Order of Prince Henry.

Cicilline voted with President Joe Biden's stated position 100% of the time, according to FiveThirtyEight analysis completed in January 2023.

On February 21, 2023, it was announced that Cicilline would resign from Congress on June 1, 2023, to become president and CEO of the Rhode Island Foundation. A special election was scheduled to fill the remainder of his term, with Gabe Amo winning in November 2023.

==== Business and telecommunications ====
In 2017, Cicilline joined the new Congressional Antitrust Caucus and co-sponsored the Merger Retrospective Act, which would require the Federal Trade Commission and the Department of Justice to do yearly studies on the effects of corporate mergers on the economy. At the time he joined the Antitrust Caucus, he was the ranking member of the Subcommittee on Regulatory Reform, Commercial and Antitrust Law.

Cicilline has come out publicly in favor of net neutrality, saying that "he will do whatever it takes" to stop the Federal Communications Commission's proposed plans to end regulation of internet service providers under Title II.

On March 7, 2018, Cicilline introduced the Journalism Competition and Preservation Act to the House. The aim of the bill was to temporarily allow news publishers to band together to negotiate with large online platforms, such as Facebook and Google. In a fact sheet published by Cicilline's office, he claimed that a "free and diverse press, particularly local press, is the backbone for a healthy and vibrant democracy". One of the bill's goals was to restore public trust in online media.

In the aftermath of the Cambridge Analytica scandal—in which Facebook reportedly gave access to the data of 50 million accounts to Cambridge Analytica—Cicilline sent a letter to the Chairman of the Judicial Committee requesting that he invite Facebook founder and CEO Mark Zuckerberg to testify before the committee. Cicilline said in a statement: “This incident is only Facebook’s latest abuse of public trust and attempt to obscure its role in the rise of information warfare and propaganda online.”

Cicilline and Representative Jeff Fortenberry sent Alphabet Inc. CEO Sundar Pichai a letter following up on a complaint from 20 advocacy groups regarding Google's compliance with the Children's Online Privacy Protection Act. The letter asked the company to reveal the details of how it collects the data of children.

Cicilline attended the November 2019 meeting of the International Grand Committee on Disinformation and 'Fake News' in Dublin. The committee was made up of parliamentarians from 10 countries, and sought to enhance global collaboration on the regulation of harmful content, hate speech, and electoral interference.

In July 2020, Cicilline chaired a meeting of the Subcommittee on Antitrust, Commercial and Administrative Law, which included Zuckerberg, Pichai, Apple Inc. CEO Tim Cook, and Amazon CEO Jeff Bezos, so that they could testify about their platforms. Cicilline and the other members of the bipartisan committee extensively interrogated and scrutinized the four CEOs, and accused them of anti-competitive practices, with Cicilline insinuating that the various platforms had problems with their competitive practices. When questioning Pichai, Cicilline claimed that Google's business model was a problem, and displayed emails from over a decade ago that showed the company had engaged in "a pattern of anti-competitive behavior." He also argued that the COVID-19 pandemic highlighted the urgent need for regulation of these companies, and compared them to past monopolies, such as the railroads and oil tycoons, AT&T, and Microsoft.

==== Foreign affairs ====
An avid supporter of nonviolence, Cicilline has taken a stance against the U.S. military presence in Libya, voting to limit the use of funds supporting NATO operations in Libya, and to remove armed forces from Libya. In 2013, he went on record as "skeptical" of the Obama administration's attempts to get congressional approval for military action in Syria.

In March 2018, Cicilline was among a handful of U.S. legislators to receive the Presidential Medal of Gratitude from President Bako Sahakyan of the Republic of Artsakh. According to Public Radio of Armenia, "The Medal of Gratitude is awarded to individuals, organizations, and collectives for significant contributions in restoring and developing the economy, science, culture, and social spheres of the NKR, as well as for defending and promoting international recognition of the Republic." Cicilline was a part of the bipartisan group of 37 U.S. Representatives to call for a $70 million aid package to Armenia and Artsakh.

On March 23, 2018, Cicilline released a statement voicing his opposition to Trump's appointment of John Bolton as National Security Advisor. Cicilline cited Bolton's advocacy for preemptive attacks on Iran and North Korea, as well as his support for the Iraq War, when he worked as Ambassador to the United Nations during President George W. Bush's administration.

In April 2018, Cicilline warned Trump against meeting with Kim Jong-un, saying, “There was a reason that prior presidents had rejected the idea of meeting with a North Korean dictator, his father, and grandfather before him, because it elevates his standing in the international community right away by having the meeting. The notion that it is historic, it is historic, but it may not be historic in a good way.”

In May 2018, Cicilline introduced a bipartisan bill to block the sale of F-35s to NATO ally Turkey. He cited concerns over Turkey's increasing aggression against U.S.-backed forces in Iraq and Syria, as well as the Turkey's increasingly friendly relationship with Russia.

Cicilline and Representative Adam Kinzinger authored an opinion piece about the UN peacekeeping mission in Liberia. They commended the UN's work in Liberia, and cited the mission as one of the UN's major peacekeeping successes.

Cicilline accused Turkey of inciting the conflict between Azerbaijan and Armenia over the disputed region of Nagorno-Karabakh. On October 1, 2020, he co-signed a letter to Secretary of State Mike Pompeo that condemned Azerbaijan's offensive operations against Nagorno-Karabakh, denounced Turkey's role in the conflict, and called for an immediate ceasefire.

==== Gun rights ====
Cicilline is a strong gun control advocate, and was a founding member of the bipartisan coalition Mayors Against Illegal Guns. In 2010, the Brady Campaign to Prevent Gun Violence endorsed Cicilline; in 2000, the National Rifle Association of America awarded him an F− lifetime score. Cicilline has also indicated his support for a ban on the sale or transfer of all forms of semi-automatic weapons, for more stringent state restrictions on the purchase and possession of firearms, and for a requirement that manufacturers equip firearms with child-safety locks. On November 16, 2011, he made a public statement against the National Right-to-Carry Reciprocity Act, which would "require all states to allow out-of-state visitors to carry concealed firearms, as long as the laws of the visitors' home states allow them to do so." He insisted that the Second Amendment had nothing to do with this bill, which he argued would infringe upon the right of state governments to protect the safety of their citizens, and would force communities to accept concealed-carry standards set by other states.

In October 2017, after the Las Vegas shooting, Cicilline introduced a bill to ban bump stocks. After the Marjory Stoneman Douglas High School shooting, he introduced the Assault Weapons Ban Act of 2018. The bill would ban 205 specific firearms, such as the AR-15 and the AK-47, outright. Cicilline was also among the members of Congress who supported the National School Walkout, and met with protesters at the U.S. Capitol.

==== Immigration ====
Cicilline has repeatedly expressed his view that the U.S. immigration system is "broken" and that the Congress must fix it. In May 2017, he opposed the Davis-Oliver Act, introduced by Representative Raúl Labrador, which would have added 12,500 armed federal immigration officers, penalized sanctuary cities, and stepped up detentions and deportation activities. Cicilline called the bill "President Trump's mass deportation act" and said it would make “our communities less safe.”

On March 6, 2018, Cicilline introduced the Advancing Mutual Interests and Growing our Success (AMIGOS) Act, which would amend the Immigration and Nationality Act to include Portugal as a country whose citizens would be eligible for entry into the United States as E-1 or E-2 nonimmigrants, provided that Portugal provides similar benefits to U.S. nationals.

==== LGBT rights ====
In March 2011, Cicilline co-sponsored a bill to repeal the Defense of Marriage Act, and supported efforts to legalize same-sex marriage.

In 2015, Cicilline introduced the Equality Act, a bill that would expand the federal Civil Rights Act of 1964 to ban discrimination based on sexual orientation and gender identity. In September 2017, he reintroduced the Equality Act. In 2019, Cicilline reintroduced the Equality Act again, the first time it was introduced in a Democratic-controlled House. The bill passed the House on May 17, 2019.

In September 2016, Cicilline asked Immigration and Customs Enforcement Director Sarah Saldana what her agency was doing to "enhance" guidelines for LGBTQ individuals in ICE custody. Saldana answered that ICE officers spoke with LGBTQ undocumented immigrants in order to properly accommodate them while they were in American detention facilities.

In July 2018, Cicilline was a co-sponsor of The Gay and Trans Panic Defense Prohibition Act. This act would prohibit defense lawyers from using a victim's LGBTQ identity as justification for a crime, or to argue for lesser sentences on the premise that there were extenuating circumstances that motivated their clients to lash out violently. Also that year, Cicilline was one of over 100 Democratic members of Congress to oppose the State Department's decision to deny or revoke diplomatic visas to unmarried same-sex partners of foreign diplomats.

==== Abortion ====
Cicilline is pro-choice, and advocates that abortions always be legally available, and that government funding be provided to clinics and medical facilities that provide abortion services. He opposed the Protect Life Act of October 2011, which would ban the use of federal funding to cover any costs under health care plans that paid for abortions, and would allow federally funded hospitals to refuse to perform abortions, even in cases in which the mother's life is in danger. Stating that the bill would put women's lives at risk and would limit "how women can spend their own private dollars to purchase health insurance", Cicilline called it "outrageous".

In February 2011, Cicilline voted against prohibiting the disbursement of federal funds to Planned Parenthood, and, in May 2011, against prohibiting taxpayer funding of abortions. He co-sponsored the Violence Against Women Health Initiative Act of 2011, which sought to "improve the health care system's assessment and response to domestic violence, dating violence, sexual assault, and stalking, and for other purposes."

==== Veterans affairs ====
Cicilline has declared his support for veterans' "access to a range of resources in health care, housing, employment, mental health services, and education". He has co-sponsored numerous acts in the interest of veterans, including the Veterans Dog Training Therapy Act, which was intended to aid veterans with post-traumatic stress disorder; the Disabled Veterans Tax Termination Act, to permit disabled veterans to receive both retirement pay and disability compensation; and the Veteran Employment Transition Act of 2011, to extend work opportunities to recently discharged veterans.

On November 18, 2011, Cicilline said of the Vow Hire Heroes Act, which was intended to increase job opportunities for veterans: "This vote ensures that Rhode Island veterans, and all of our nation's veterans, will receive some of the tools and resources they need to successfully reenter the workforce, and provide for their families and loved ones".

=== House leadership ===
- Chair, Democratic Policy and Communications Committee (2019–)
- Co-chair, Democratic Policy and Communications Committee (2017–2019)

=== Committee assignments ===
- Committee on Foreign Affairs
  - Subcommittee on Europe, Eurasia, and Emerging Threats
  - Subcommittee on Middle East and North Africa
  - Subcommittee on Oversight and Investigations
- Committee on Judiciary
  - Subcommittee on Antitrust, Commercial and Administrative Law (chairman)
  - Subcommittee on Crime, Terrorism and Homeland Security

=== Caucus memberships ===
- Congressional Arts Caucus
- Congressional Common Ground Caucus (co-founder)
- Congressional Progressive Caucus (Vice-chair)
- Congressional Buy American Caucus
- House Manufacturing Caucus
- Congressional Creative Rights Caucus
- Congressional LGBT Equality Caucus (Co-chair)
- Antitrust Caucus
- House Climate Solutions Caucus
- House Baltic Caucus
- Afterschool Caucuses
- United States Congressional International Conservation Caucus
- Medicare for All Caucus
- Congressional Peacekeeping Caucus (co-founder/co-chair)
- Diplomacy Caucus (co-founder/co-chair)

== Electoral history ==
=== Mayoral ===
2002

2002 Providence Democratic mayoral primary
Party	Candidate	Votes	%
Democratic	David N. Cicilline	14,167	52.09
Democratic	Joseph R. Paolino Jr.	9,253	34.02
Democratic	David V. Igliozzi	3,047	11.20
Democratic	Keven A. McKenna	730	2.68
Turnout		27,197	28.38

2002 Providence mayoral election
Party	Candidate	Votes	%
Democratic	David N. Cicilline	29,843	83.83
Republican	David B. Talan	3,453	9.70
Green	Greg Gerritt	1,371	3.85
Independent	Christopher F. Young	931	2.62
Total votes		35,598	100

2006

2006 Providence Democratic mayoral primary
Party	Candidate	Votes	%
Democratic	David N. Cicilline (incumbent)	11,849	73.95
Democratic	Christopher F. Young	4,175	26.06
Total votes		16,024	100

2006 Providence mayoral election
Party	Candidate	Votes	%
Democratic	David N. Cicilline (incumbent)	30,835	83.44
Republican	Daniel S. Harrop III	6,119	16.56
Total votes		36,954	100

=== House of Representatives ===
2010

2010 Rhode Island's 1st congressional district Democratic primary
Party	Candidate	Votes	%
Democratic	David N. Cicilline	21,142	37.2
Democratic	Anthony P. Gemma	13,112	23.1
Democratic	David Segal	11,397	20.1
Democratic	William J. Lynch	11,161	19.6
Total votes		56,812	100

2010 Rhode Island's 1st congressional district election
Party	Candidate	Votes	%
Democratic	David N. Cicilline	81,269	50.6
Republican	John J. Loughlin Jr.	71,542	44.6
Independent	Kenneth A. Capalbo	6,424	4.0
Fox	Gregory Raposa	1,334	0.8
Total votes		160,569	100

2012

2012 Rhode Island's 1st congressional district Democratic primary
Party	Candidate	Votes	%
Democratic	David N. Cicilline (incumbent)	30,203	61.1
Democratic	Anthony P. Gemma	14,702	30.2
Democratic	Christopher F. Young	3,701	7.6
Total votes		48,606	100

2012 Rhode Island's 1st congressional district election
Party	Candidate	Votes	%
Democratic	David N. Cicilline (incumbent)	108,612	53.0
Republican	Brendan P. Doherty	83,737	40.8
Independent	David S. Vogel	12,504	6.1
Write-in		262	0.1
Total votes		205,115	100

2014

2014 Rhode Island's 1st congressional district Democratic primary
Party	Candidate	Votes	%
Democratic	David N. Cicilline (incumbent)	38,186	63.0
Democratic	Matthew J. Fecteau	22,447	37.0
Total votes		60,633	100

2014 Rhode Island's 1st congressional district election
Party	Candidate	Votes	%
Democratic	David N. Cicilline (incumbent)	87,060	59.5
Republican	Cormick Brendan Lynch	58,877	40.2
Write-in		416	0.3
Total votes		146,353	100

2016

2016 Rhode Island's 1st congressional district Democratic primary
Party	Candidate	Votes	%
Democratic	David N. Cicilline (incumbent)	24,136	67.6
Democratic	Christopher F. Young	11,594	32.4
Total votes		35,730	100

2016 Rhode Island's 1st congressional district election
Party	Candidate	Votes	%
Democratic	David N. Cicilline (incumbent)	130,540	64.5
Republican	Harold Russell Taub	71,023	35.1
Write-in		814	0.4
Total votes		202,377	100

2018

2018 Rhode Island's 1st congressional district Democratic primary
Party	Candidate	Votes	%
Democratic	David N. Cicilline (incumbent)	47,762	78.0
Democratic	Christopher Young	13,474	22.0
Total votes		61,236	100

2018 Rhode Island's 1st congressional district election
Party	Candidate	Votes	%
Democratic	David N. Cicilline (incumbent)	116,099	66.7
Republican	Patrick J. Donovan	57,567	33.1
Write-in		417	0.2
Total votes		174,083	100

2020

2020 Rhode Island's 1st congressional district Democratic primary
Party	Candidate	Votes	%
Democratic	David N. Cicilline (incumbent)	25,234	100
Total votes		25,234	100

2020 Rhode Island's 1st congressional district election
Party	Candidate	Votes	%
Democratic	David N. Cicilline (incumbent)	158,550	70.8
Independent	Frederick Wysocki	35,457	15.8
Independent	Jeffrey Edward Lemire	28,300	12.6
Write-in		1,553	0.7
Total votes		223,860	100

2022 Rhode Island's 1st congressional district election
Party	Candidate	Votes	%
Democratic	David Cicilline (incumbent)	99,802	64.0
Republican	Allen Waters	55,909	35.8
Write-in		361	0.2
Total votes		155,711	100

== See also ==
- List of Jewish members of the United States Congress
- List of LGBT members of the United States Congress

Political offices
Preceded by John Lombardi	Mayor of Providence; 2003–2011	Succeeded by Angel Taveras
U.S. House of Representatives
Preceded by Patrick Kennedy	Member of the U.S. House of Representatives from Rhode Island's 1st congressional district 2011–2023	Succeeded by Gabe Amo
Preceded by Jared Polis	Chair of the Congressional Equality Caucus; 2019–2023	Succeeded by Mark Pocan
Party political offices
Preceded by Steve Israel	Chair of the Democratic Policy and Communications Committee; 2017–2021; Served alongside: Cheri Bustos, Hakeem Jeffries (2017–2019)	Succeeded by Joe Neguse
U.S. order of precedence (ceremonial)
Preceded by Tim Bishop as Former U.S. Representative	Order of precedence of the United States as Former U.S. Representative	Succeeded by Phil Roe as Former U.S. Representative
