= 2012 United States Senate election in Rhode Island =

- November 6, 2012
- Turnout: 58.0% (voting eligible)
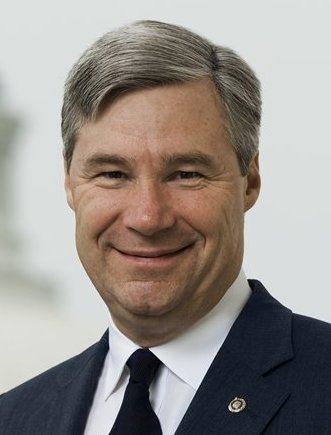

Nominee	Sheldon Whitehouse	Barry Hinckley
Party	Democratic	Republican
Popular vote	271,034	146,222
Percentage	64.81%	34.97%
- Whitehouse: 50–60% 60–70% 70–80% 80–90% Hinckley: 50–60%
U.S. senator before election
Sheldon Whitehouse
Democratic
Elected U.S. Senator
Sheldon Whitehouse
Democratic

The 2012 United States Senate election in Rhode Island was on November 6, 2012, alongside the presidential election, elections to the United States House of Representatives, and various state and local elections.

In the 2006 Senate election, former Attorney General of Rhode Island Sheldon Whitehouse defeated one-term Republican incumbent Lincoln Chafee. Chafee had been appointed to the Senate in 1999 when his father, the incumbent senator John Chafee died. He then won election to a first term in 2000. Whitehouse won 53.52% of the vote in 2006.

Incumbent Democratic Senator Sheldon Whitehouse was reelected to a second term in a landslide by a 30-point margin of 65% - 35%. This election was the first time since 1970 that the election for Rhode Island's Class 1 Senate seat did not feature a member of the Chafee family.

== Democratic primary ==
=== Candidates ===
==== Declared ====
- Sheldon Whitehouse, incumbent U.S. Senator

==== Unsuccessful ====
- Todd Giroux, contractor and Independent candidate for governor in 2010

=== Results ===
Democratic primary results
Party	Candidate	Votes	%
Democratic	Sheldon Whitehouse (incumbent)	60,223	100.00%
Total votes		60,223	100.00%

== Republican primary ==
=== Candidates ===
==== Declared ====
- Barry Hinckley, president and co-founder of software company Bullhorn

==== Declined ====
- Joseph Almond, Lincoln town administrator
- Scott Avedisian, Mayor of Warwick
- Donald Carcieri, former Governor of Rhode Island
- Giovanni Cicione, former chairman of the Rhode Island Republican Party
- Brendan Doherty, former Rhode Island state police superintendent (running for a U.S. House seat)
- Leo Fontaine, Mayor of Woonsocket
- Allan Fung, Mayor of Cranston
- John Robitaille, businessman and nominee for Governor in 2010

=== Polling ===
Poll source	Date(s) administered	Sample size	Margin of error	Scott Avedisian	Donald Carcieri	Buddy Cianci	Giovanni Cicione	Allan Fung	John Loughlin	John Robitaille	Catherine Taylor	Other/ Undecided
Public Policy Polling	February 16–22, 2011	250	±6.2%	12%	44%	12%	0%	6%	12%	12%	2%	—

=== Results ===
Republican primary results
Party	Candidate	Votes	%
Republican	Barry Hinckley	6,890	100.00%
Total votes		6,890	100.00%

== Independent ==
=== Candidates ===
==== Declined ====
- Alan Hassenfeld, former Hasbro CEO

== General election ==
=== Predictions ===
Source	Ranking	As of
The Cook Political Report	Solid D	November 1, 2012
Sabato's Crystal Ball	Safe D	November 5, 2012
Rothenberg Political Report	Safe D	November 2, 2012
Real Clear Politics	Safe D	November 5, 2012

=== Debates ===
- Complete video of debate, October 24, 2012 - YouTube

=== Polling ===
Poll source	Date(s) administered	Sample size	Margin of error	Sheldon Whitehouse (D)	Barry Hinckley (R)	Other	Undecided
Fleming & Associates	February 20–23, 2012	511	±4.38%	50%	28%	—	20%
Fleming & Associates	September 26–29, 2012	501	±4.38%	56%	30%	—	11%
Brown University	September 26 – October 5, 2012	471	±4.4%	59%	30%	—	12%
McLaughlin and Associates	October 11, 2012	300	±5.6%	49%	41%	—	10%
Fleming & Associates	October 24–27, 2012	601	±4%	55%	33%	—	10%

Hypothetical polling

Poll source	Date(s) administered	Sample size	Margin of error	Sheldon Whitehouse (D)	Scott Avedisian (R)	Other	Undecided
Public Policy Polling	February 16–22, 2011	544	±4.2%	47%	37%	—	16%

Poll source	Date(s) administered	Sample size	Margin of error	Sheldon Whitehouse (D)	Donald Carcieri (R)	Other	Undecided
Public Policy Polling	February 16–22, 2011	544	±4.2%	54%	37%	—	8%

Poll source	Date(s) administered	Sample size	Margin of error	Sheldon Whitehouse (D)	Donald Carcieri (R)	Buddy Cianci (I)	Other	Undecided
Public Policy Polling	February 16–22, 2011	544	±4.2%	43%	31%	22%	—	4%

Poll source	Date(s) administered	Sample size	Margin of error	Sheldon Whitehouse (D)	Buddy Cianci (R)	Other	Undecided
Public Policy Polling	February 16–22, 2011	544	±4.2%	51%	35%	—	14%

Poll source	Date(s) administered	Sample size	Margin of error	Sheldon Whitehouse (D)	John Loughlin (R)	Other	Undecided
Public Policy Polling	February 16–22, 2011	544	±4.2%	51%	34%	—	15%

Poll source	Date(s) administered	Sample size	Margin of error	Sheldon Whitehouse (D)	John Robitaille (R)	Other	Undecided
Public Policy Polling	February 16–22, 2011	544	±4.2%	49%	38%	—	13%

Poll source	Date(s) administered	Sample size	Margin of error	Sheldon Whitehouse (D)	John Robitaille (R)	Buddy Cianci (I)	Other	Undecided
Public Policy Polling	February 16–22, 2011	544	±4.2%	44%	28%	24%	—	4%

=== Results ===

United States Senate election in Rhode Island, 2012
Party	Candidate	Votes	%	±%
Democratic	Sheldon Whitehouse (incumbent)	271,034	64.81%	+11.29%
Republican	Barry Hinckley	146,222	34.97%	−11.51%
Write-in		933	0.22%	N/A
Total votes		418,189	100.00%	N/A
Democratic hold				

==== By county ====
	Sheldon Whitehouse Democratic		Barry Hinckley Republican		Others	
County	Votes	%	Votes	%	Votes	%
Bristol	14,556	63.4%	8,390	36.5%	32	0.1%
Kent	44,332	59.3%	30,217	40.4%	170	0.2%
Newport	22,774	61.5%	14,224	38.4%	50	0.1%
Providence	154,123	68.9%	69,136	30.9%	549	0.2%
Washington	35,006	59.0%	24,209	40.8%	131	0.2%

===== Counties that flipped from Republican to Democratic =====
- Bristol (largest municipality: Bristol)
- Kent (largest city: Warwick)
- Newport (largest municipality: Newport)
- Washington (largest municipality: South Kingstown)

==== By congressional district ====
Whitehouse won both congressional districts.

District	Whitehouse	Hinckley	Representative
1st	68.5%	31.5%	David Cicilline
2nd	61.71%	38.29%	James Langevin

== See also ==
- 2012 United States Senate elections
- 2012 United States House of Representatives elections in Rhode Island
