= Brendan Doherty =

American politician

Personal details
- Born: March 14, 1959 (age 67) Attleboro, Massachusetts, U.S.
- Party: Democratic (since 2014) Republican (until 2014)
- Education: Rhode Island College; Roger Williams University; Anna Maria College
- Occupation: Rhode Island State Police=Colonel
- Website: Campaign website

Brendan Doherty (born March 14, 1959) is a former Rhode Island State Police Superintendent and the 2012 Republican nominee for Rhode Island's 1st congressional district. Doherty was employed at Blue Cross Blue Shield of Rhode Island as the Director of the Special Investigations Unit identifying healthcare fraud from 2013 until 2019. Doherty is currently the owner and operator of the Doherty Group, a private investigations and security consulting firm based out of Providence, Rhode Island.

== Early life ==
The second of three sons, his father Edward Doherty was a dentist, and his mother Carol (Flynn) Doherty was a nurse. His father was an avid contract bridge player having risen to the rank of Life Master.

Doherty studied at Bishop Feehan High School in Attleboro, Mass., where he was the team captain of the school's basketball team. However, just as he was finishing high school, his father became very ill due to diabetes and the family's financial situation became very serious since his father could no longer run his dental practice and his mother had to continue working while also caring for her ailing husband. Though Doherty had been awarded a partial scholarship to attend Bryant University, he quickly realized that his family were not able to financially support him and so enrolled at Rhode Island College, financing his education by working at various jobs.

== Law enforcement career ==
At the age of 21, Doherty joined the ranks of the Rhode Island State Police as a uniform trooper. Doherty was promoted through the ranks to that of captain. In November 2002, he was appointed the force's executive officer, which is the second highest-ranking position in the Rhode Island State Police. In August 2004, having served for 24 years, Doherty retired with the rank of major. While serving in the police he earned a bachelor of arts degree in criminology from Roger Williams University and later a master's degree in criminal justice from Anna Maria College. During his law enforcement career he earned 24 commendations for outstanding police work.

After retiring from the police force, Doherty worked from 2004 through to 2007 as the director of public safety at Roger Williams University. In April 2007 Doherty returned to the Rhode Island State Police and was sworn in as the 11th superintendent of the force, holding the rank of Colonel and responsible for supervising the activities of 350 sworn and civilian personnel with an 80 million dollar budget. In 2009, in addition to his position as Superintendent of the state police, legislation was passed appointing Doherty to become the first Commissioner of Public Safety for the state overseeing the Rhode Island State Fire Marshal, E 911, Capitol Police, Municipal Police Academy and RI Grants Administration Office. Doherty served from April 2007 until his retirement in April 2011.

== 2012 congressional campaign ==
In March 2012, Doherty announced that he would be running for the Republican nomination in order to challenge Democratic incumbent Rep. David Cicilline for Rhode Island's 1st congressional district. At first Doherty faced former State Rep. John J. Loughlin, Jr. for the nomination, however Loughlin later dropped out of the race, leaving Doherty as the only Republican in the running for the seat. Even though the 1st District has a large Democratic leaning, Doherty has been competitive in polls because of Cicilline's unpopularity and controversies from his time as Mayor of Providence. Early polling briefly showed Doherty leading Cicilline. Subsequent polling showed the race much closer and Cicilline defeated Doherty by 53% to 41%. In 2014 Doherty changed his party affiliation to Democrat.

== Personal life ==
On September 10, 1983, Doherty married his sweetheart Michele Lapierre and they have two children: Matthew, born in 1987, and Shelby, born in 1989.

Awards

Bishop Feehan High School Outstanding Alumni- Bishop Feehan High School Athletic Hall of Fame- R.I. Criminal Justice Hall of Fame-

- NAACP Community Service Award (2010)
- Cesar Chavez Award for Providence (2010)
- Rhode Island Big Brothers Humanitarian Award (2009)
- American Red Cross Life Saving Award (1998)

Political offices
New office	Commissioner of Public Safety; 2007–2011	Succeeded by Steven O'Donnell
