= Dennis Canario =

Member of the Rhode Island House of Representatives

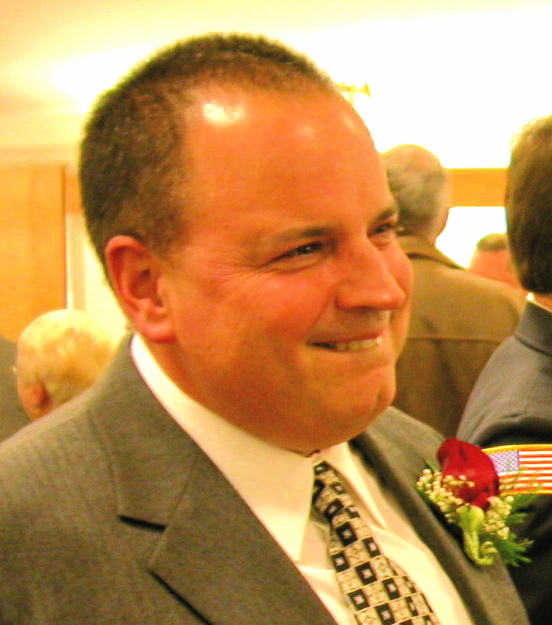

Member of the Rhode Island House of Representatives from the 71st district
- In office January 1, 2013 – January 5, 2021
- Preceded by: Daniel P. Gordon
- Succeeded by: Michelle McGaw

Personal details
- Born: August 18, 1960 (59) Barrington, Rhode Island
- Party: Democratic
- Spouse: Amy Canario
- Children: 3
- Education: Roger Williams University
- Profession: Detective and Politician
- Website: denniscanario.com

Dennis M. Canario (born August 18, 1960) is an American politician and a former Democratic member of the Rhode Island House of Representatives representing District 71 from 2013 to 2021. He also served as deputy majority leader of the Rhode Island House of Representatives. Prior to being elected to District 71, Dennis served on the Portsmouth Town Council from 2004 to 2010. During the 2008 session, Dennis served as the president of the town council.

== Personal life ==
Dennis currently resides in Portsmouth, Rhode Island with his wife, Amy and daughter, Olivia. Dennis also has two sons, Dennis Canario, Jr. of Portsmouth, Rhode Island and Jonathan (Canario) Greenspan of Boston, Massachusetts.

== Education ==
He graduated in the 1978 class of the St. Andrew's School in Barrington, Rhode Island. Canario earned his associate degree in criminal justice from Roger Williams University.

== Before Portsmouth Town Council ==
Dennis founded the Portsmouth Police Cadet Explorer Program and he was a Portsmouth Senior Citizens Advocate during time between 1997 and 2001.

== June 2020 ==
On June 12, 2020, Canario announced he wouldn't be seeking re-election in 2020.

== Elections ==
- 2012 When District 71 Libertarian Representative Daniel P. Gordon left the Legislature and left the seat open, Canario was unopposed for both the September 11, 2012 Democratic Primary, winning with 513 votes (51.9%) and the November 6, 2012 General election, winning with 4,829 votes.
