= Daniel P. Gordon =

American politician (1969–2017)

Daniel P. Gordon Jr.

Member of the Rhode Island House of Representatives from the 71st district
- In office January 4, 2011 – January 4, 2013
- Preceded by: John J. Loughlin, Jr.
- Succeeded by: Dennis Canario

Personal details
- Born: April 12, 1969 Bristol, Pennsylvania, US
- Died: March 25, 2017 (aged 47)
- Party: Republican (until 2011); Libertarian (2011–2017)
- Education: Marine Corps Institute

Military service
- Branch/service: United States Marine Corps
- Years of service: 1987–1991

Daniel Peter Gordon Jr. (April 12, 1969 – March 25, 2017) was an American politician and construction contractor. Gordon was a Libertarian member of the Rhode Island House of Representatives. Gordon was elected as a Republican Representative in November 2010 for the 71st District, defeating Democratic candidate George S. Alzaibak.

In September 2011 he was expelled from the Republican caucus for allegedly making derogatory comments about other Republicans online. Gordon changed his party affiliation from Republican to Libertarian, becoming the only Libertarian Party member in any United States legislature during that time.

== Background ==
Gordon was born in Bristol, Pennsylvania. He served in the United States Marine Corps.

== Rhode Island House of Representatives ==
=== 2010 Election ===
Gordon decided to run as a Republican for Rhode Island's 71st house district, based in Jamestown, Portsmouth, and Little Compton, when Republican State Representative John J. Loughlin, Jr. retired from that position to run for Rhode Island's 1st congressional district, which had been vacated by retiring Democrat U.S. Congressman Patrick J. Kennedy.

Gordon became the Republican nominee and narrowly defeated Democratic nominee George Alzaibak 50.4–49.6%, a difference of just 47 votes.

=== Controversies ===
In March 2011, he received media attention over a controversial comment on an online article reporting that Tiverton High School started the school's first Gay-Straight Alliance. His comment read "And this is why if I have anything to say about it, Tiverton will lose school funding to local charter schools. It doesn't matter if gay or straight, if sexual meet-up groups are being promoted in our schools rather than improving test scores, that school is failing. Is it really more important for our children to get 'sexed-up', than learning advanced math?".

On September 16, 2011, Gordon was arrested on a Massachusetts warrant for failure to appear in court. This arose from an incident in 2008 in which, allegedly, a Massachusetts state trooper attempted to stop Gordon for driving erratically and Gordon fled in his car, eventually being apprehended on a dead-end street. Gordon was charged with leaving the lane of travel, failing to stop for the police, driving an unregistered motor vehicle, and driving on a suspended license. He then failed to appear in court in 2008. These charges were dismissed after Gordon paid $1000 and spent a year on probation.

=== 2012 Election ===
Gordon ran for re-election in the November 6, 2012 election as a Libertarian, but failed to get enough signatures to get on the ballot. He ran as a write-in candidate, but lost the election to Democrat Dennis Canario by a wide margin, thus leaving no Libertarians in any state legislature in the country.

== Death ==
Gordon died on March 25, 2017.
