= Keven McKenna =

American lawyer and politician (c. 1945–2022)

Keven Alexander McKenna (c. 1944 – March 4, 2022) was an American lawyer and politician.

McKenna was born in Westerly, Rhode Island and graduated from Westerly High School. He went to Georgetown University, Georgetown University Law Center, and Syracuse University. He served as a Rhode Island Assistant Attorney General. He was a candidate for Lieutenant Governor of Rhode Island in 1976 and Rhode Island Attorney General in 1978 but lost in the Democratic primary both times.

McKenna served in the Rhode Island House of Representatives from 1979 to 1985 and was a Democrat. As a legislator he was noted for being strongly pro-life due to his being a devout Roman Catholic. In 1983 he organized the Providence Recall Coalition which sought to recall Mayor of Providence Buddy Cianci.

In 1984 the conviction of Mayor Cianci was convicted on felony charges and removed from office. He unsuccessfully ran for Mayor of Providence in a special election in 1984 following Cianci ouster.

In 1985 he was elected as a delegate to the Rhode Island Constitutional Convention and served as its chairman in 1986. The Convention succeeded in producing a neutral rewrite of the 1843 Rhode Island Constitution and proposing several amendments which were voted on in November 1986. He also served as a Providence municipal judge from 1986 to 1994.

In his legal career, he was the senior partner of the law firm of McKenna, Greenwood & Feinstein in Providence.

McKenna's last forays into politics were defeats in the Democratic primaries of 2014 and 2016 for state senator for District 17, representing the towns of North Smithfield and Lincoln.

He died on March 4, 2022, at the age of 77.
