= Dehner Company =

Footwear manufacturer in Nebraska, U.S.

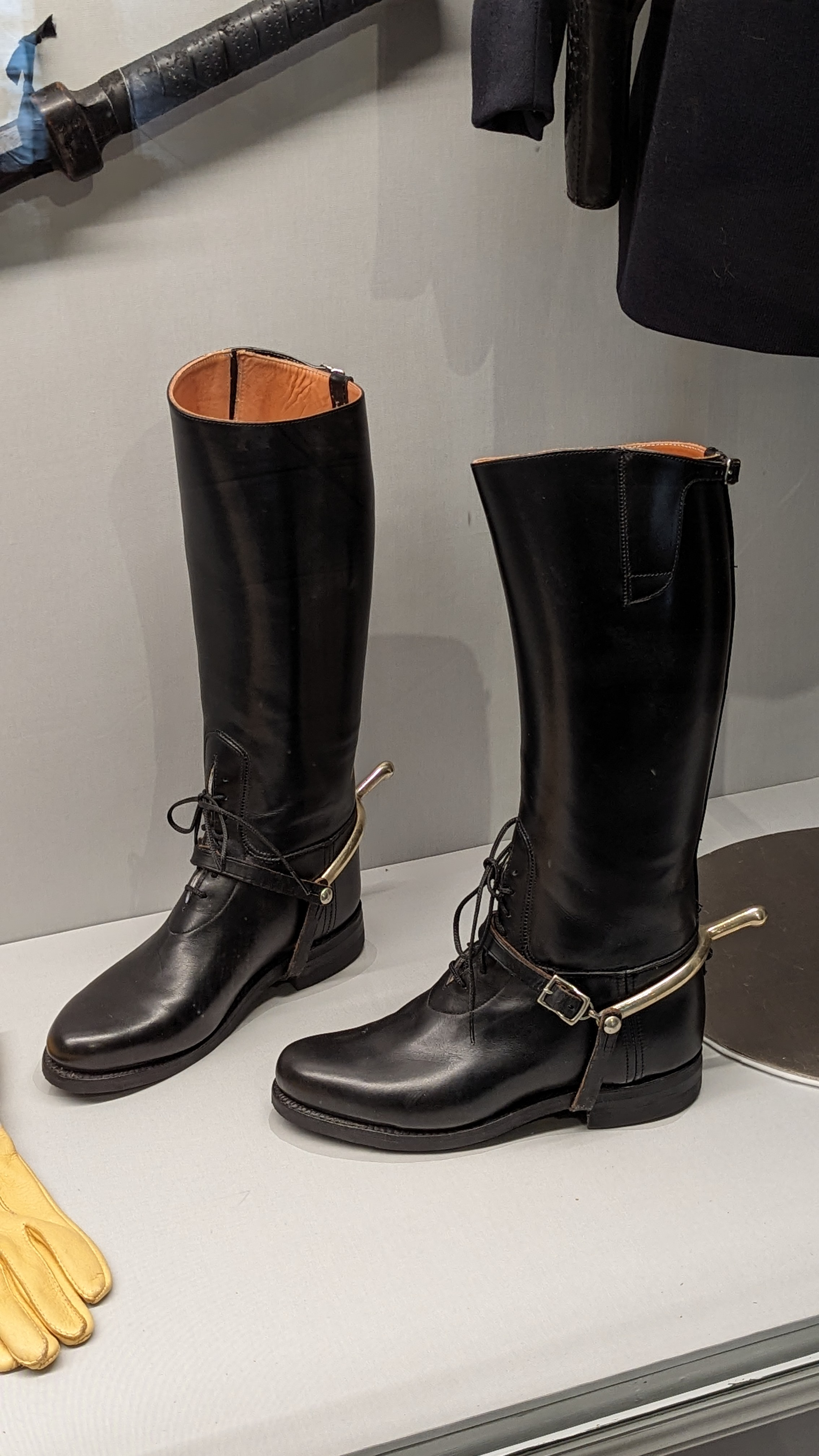
Riding boots by Dehner Company in the San Francisco Fire Department Museum

The Dehner Company is a footwear manufacturer based in Omaha, Nebraska. The company makes equestrian boots as well as boots for military and law enforcement. Dehner custom boots were a favorite of Ronald Reagan. The company is also known as a manufacturer of boots for NASA and crewed spaceflight from Project Mercury through the space shuttle program. After STS-51-L Challenger, NASA, in need of an escape system, required the reintroduction of the wearing of pressure suits during the launch and landing portions of the flight. Dehner's boots were not compatible with this system.
