= Rhode Island Department of Public Safety =

Government department of Rhode Island

Agency overview
- Formed: 2008
- Jurisdiction: The State of Rhode Island
- Headquarters: Providence, Rhode Island
- Agency executive: Colonel Darnell S. Weaver, Commissioner
- Child agencies: Rhode Island State Police; Division of the Rhode Island State Fire Marshal; Rhode Island Municipal Police Training Academy; E 9-1-1 Uniform Emergency Telephone System; Rhode Island Capitol Police; Rhode Island Division of Sheriffs; Department of Public Safety Central Management Office; Public Safety Grants Administration Office
- Website: Official website

The Rhode Island Department of Public Safety is one of the newest departments in Rhode Island's entire government. Composed of the Rhode Island State Police, the Division of the Rhode Island State Fire Marshal, the Rhode Island Municipal Police Training Academy, the E 9-1-1 Uniform Emergency Telephone System, the Rhode Island Capitol Police, the Rhode Island Division of Sheriffs, the Department of Public Safety Central Management Office, and the Public Safety Grants Administration Office. The department is responsible for the administration of all police and public safety affairs for the State.

Formed in 2008, the holder of the Office of the Commissioner is also the Superintendent of the Rhode Island State Police. The Inaugural Commissioner of the Department of Public Safety was Colonel Brendan Doherty. The Current Commissioner of the Department of Public Safety is Colonel Darnell S. Weaver, of the Rhode Island State Police.
