= David Segal (politician) =

American politician

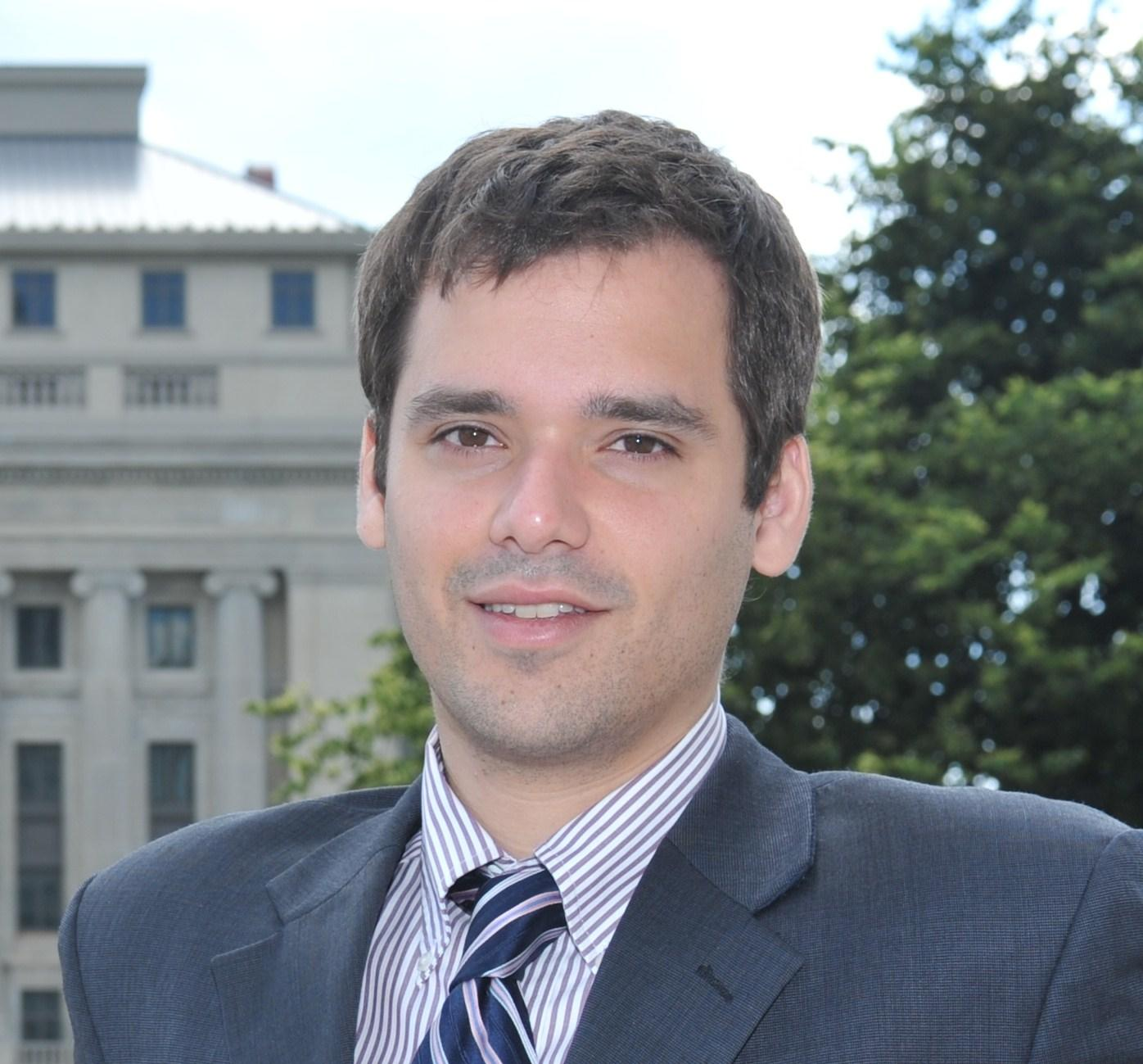

Member of the Rhode Island House of Representatives from the 2nd district
- In office January 2, 2007 – January 4, 2011
- Preceded by: Paul Moura
- Succeeded by: Christopher Blazejewski

Personal details
- Born: 1979 or 1980 (age 46–47) Washington, D.C., U.S.
- Party: Green (before 2006); Democratic (2006–present)
- Education: Columbia University (BA)
- Website: Campaign website

David Adam Segal (born 1979/1980) is an American politician, activist, and writer who was a Democratic member of the Rhode Island House of Representatives, representing District 2 (East Providence and Providence) from 2007 until January 2011. Prior to that, he served as Minority Leader of the Providence City Council from 2003 until 2007, elected at the age of 22 as the first and only member of the Green Party ever elected in Rhode Island. Segal was a candidate for the U.S. House of Representatives in the state's 1st congressional district on September 14, 2010. He served as the executive director of the online organizing group Demand Progress. As of 2024 he was Vice President for Public Policy at Yelp, with a focus an anti-monopoly policy.

== Early life and education ==
Segal was born in Washington, D.C. He graduated magna cum laude from Columbia University in 2001 with a Bachelor of Arts in mathematics. He later served as a fellow at Yale Law School's Information Society Project and at Stanford Law School's Center for Internet and Society.

== Political career ==
Segal's political career began in 2002, following his work as activist in support of a living-wage ordinance and a civilian review board to review accusations of police abuse. Segal ran as a Green for the Providence City Council and was elected to the Providence City Council, representing Ward One, with approximately 38% of the vote in a four-way general election.

Segal was chairman and founder of the federal political action committee Greens for Impact which helped steer the Green Party to endorse David Cobb rather than Ralph Nader, and ran a national media and direct-mail campaign in 2004, encouraging Greens and progressives in swing states to fight the re-election of George W. Bush by voting for John Kerry, and promoting electoral reform.

Following a party switch to the Democratic Party, Segal won the party primary election for state representative in Rhode Island House District 2 with 68.5 percent of the vote on September 12, 2006. Segal faced no partisan opposition on the November 7, 2006, state general election. Segal was re-elected in 2008, again winning 68.4% of the Democratic primary vote.

During his tenure in the Rhode Island House of Representatives, Segal was a member of the Environment and Natural Resources Committee as well as the Judiciary Committee. He previously served on the Corporations Committee. He has sponsored and overseen the passage of legislation promoting renewable energy and public transit, reform of the criminal justice system, progressive taxation, maintenance of social services, equitable school funding, and more. He was secretary of the House of Representatives' progressive caucus during the 2009-2010 sessions. The Providence Phoenix declared him "The Hippest Guy in State Government".

=== Congressional campaigns ===
==== 2010 ====
Segal ran for Congress in the 2010 elections for Rhode Island's 1st congressional district, for the seat held by Patrick J. Kennedy, who did not seek re-election. Segal lost in the four-way September 14, 2010, Democratic Party primary to David Cicilline, garnering over 20% of the vote.

==== 2022 ====
Segal ran for the Democratic nomination in Rhode Island's 2nd congressional district in the 2022 election, for the seat being vacated by James Langevin, coming in second place out of six candidates in the Democratic primary. He was endorsed by Bernie Sanders and Elizabeth Warren

== Activism ==
As the executive director of the online organizing, policy, and lobbying group Demand Progress, Segal has advocated to defeat SOPA, curtail mass surveillance, protect net neutrality, confront corporate monopoly power, reduce militarism, and promote other progressive causes. Segal is a co-editor of a book about the organizing that led to the defeat of SOPA, published by O/R Books, called Hacking Politics.
