= John J. Loughlin Jr. =

American politician

John Loughlin
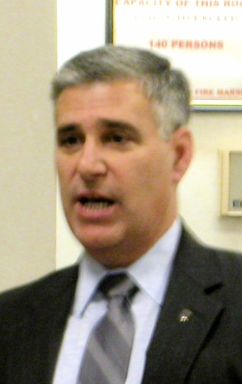
- Loughlin in 2008

Member of the Rhode Island House of Representatives from the 71st district
- In office January 4, 2005 – January 4, 2011
- Preceded by: William Enos
- Succeeded by: Daniel P. Gordon

Personal details
- Born: March 3, 1959 (age 67)
- Party: Republican
- Education: Rhode Island College (attended); University of Rhode Island (attended); Excelsior University (BA)

John J. Loughlin II (born March 3, 1959) is an American politician who was a Republican member of the Rhode Island House of Representatives, representing the 71st District from 2005 to 2010. During the 2009-2010 sessions he served on the House Committees on Labor and Veterans Affairs, and he also served as minority whip. In June, 2010 he announced that he would not run for another term and that he would be running for U.S. Congress in the First Congressional seat being vacated by Patrick J. Kennedy. He lost in the 2010 general election to outgoing Providence Mayor David Cicilline.

Loughlin currently hosts The John Loughlin Show on local Providence radio station WPRO (AM) Saturdays from 11am-2pm.

Party political offices
Preceded by Aaron Guckian	Republican nominee for Lieutenant Governor of Rhode Island; 2026	Most recent
