= Rhode Island State Police =

- Uniform Patch

- Hat badge
- Abbreviation: RISP
- Motto: "In the Service of the State"

Agency overview
- Formed: April 2, 1925; 101 years ago
- Employees: 305 (as of 2016)

Jurisdictional structure
- Operations jurisdiction: Rhode Island, USA
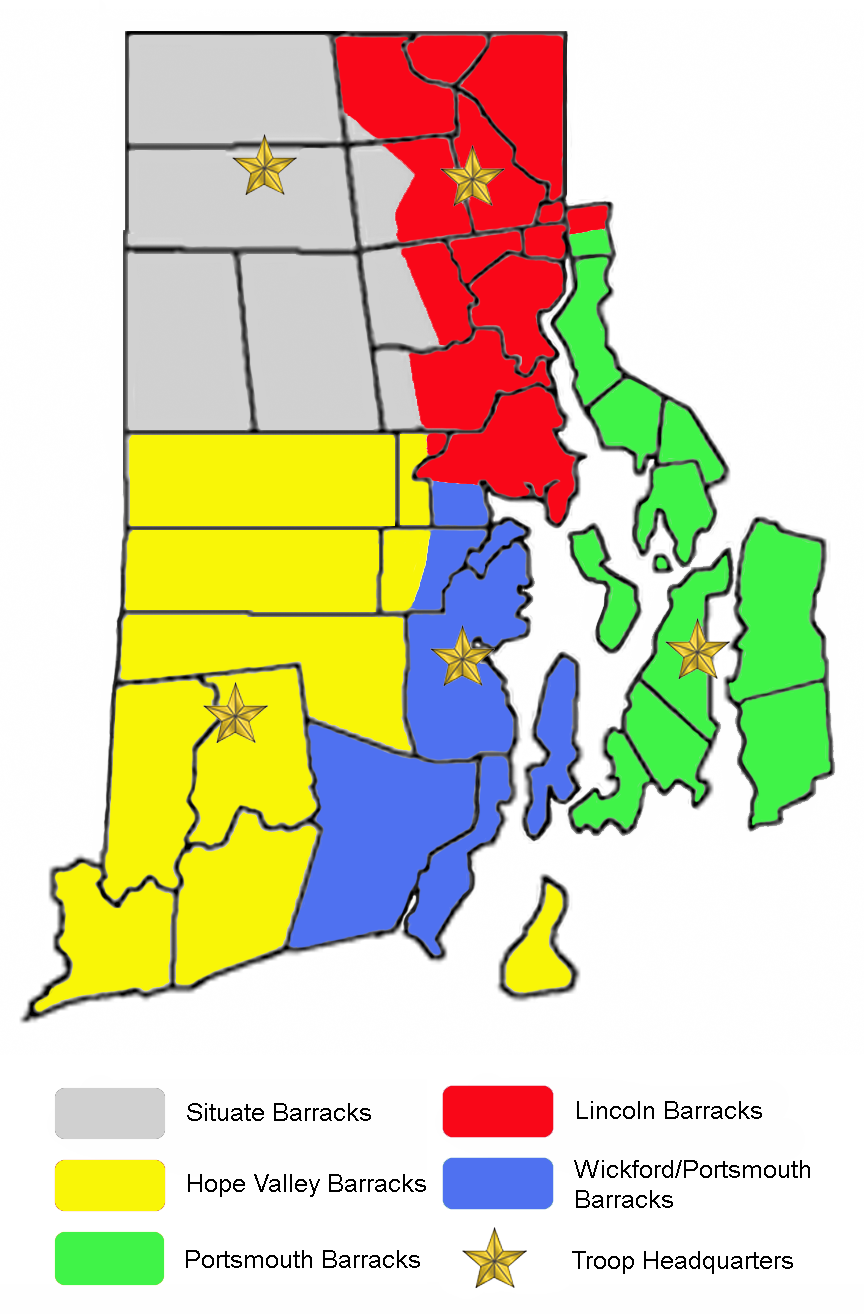
- Map of Rhode Island State Police's jurisdiction
- Area: 1,545 square miles (4,000 km^{2})
- Population: 1,057,832 (2007 est.)
- General nature: Civilian police

Operational structure
- Headquarters: North Scituate, Rhode Island
- Troopers: 228 (as of 2017)
- Civilian employees: 50 (as of 2016)
- Agency executives: Colonel Darnell S. Weaver, Superintendent of the Rhode Island State Police; Major Dennis B. Fleming, Deputy Superintendent of the Rhode Island State Police
- Parent agency: Rhode Island Department of Public Safety

Facilities
- Barracks: 5

Website
- www.risp.ri.gov

The Rhode Island State Police (RISP) is an agency of the US state of Rhode Island responsible for statewide law enforcement and regulation, especially in areas underserved by local police agencies and on the state's limited-access highways. Its headquarters is in North Scituate (a village of Scituate).

== History ==
The RISP was founded in 1925 at the request of the state's General Assembly, and was modeled on the organization structure of the Pennsylvania State Police. Its first headquarters was in the Benefit Street Marine Corps Armory in Providence, which stationed the first twenty-three troopers and the Superintendent. At this stage, the division relied heavily on Indian motorcycles to perform their wide-ranging patrol duties.

In 1936, the RISP acquired the so-called Coggeshall property in North Scituate. Consisting of approximately 145 acres of land and many outbuildings, the centerpiece of the property and new headquarters building was the Coggeshall Mansion, built in the late 19th century. The mansion and outbuildings are still in use by the RISP.

During this time, the division organized itself into three patrol districts comprising the northern, southern, and "island" parts of the state. As the twentieth century progressed, the RISP enlarged and modified itself, establishing new barracks and instituting new programs to further meet its statewide policing mandate.

Troopers did not apply to join the Rhode Island State Police but "enlisted" for three-year periods, after which they could apply for reenlistment. The reenlistment included a review of job performance and a full medical examination. If the member was found to be suitable for reenlistment, they were sworn in again by a member of the Division's Command Staff. This longstanding three-year enlistment continues to this day.

== RISP at present ==
Currently, the RISP is composed of two districts, District "A" which covers the northern half of the state and District "B" which covers the southern half of the state. There are currently four patrol commands, referred to as barracks, located in:

- Lincoln (RISP-Lincoln Woods Barracks)
- Richmond (RISP-Hope Valley Barracks)
- North Scituate (RISP-Scituate Barracks)
- North Kingstown (RISP-Wickford Barracks)

The RISP fields an additional patrol command at the TF Green Airport in Warwick. The Portsmouth Barracks would be the fifth, but is not currently in use.

Construction of the Rhode Island State Police Headquarters was completed in 2010 in North Scituate on the same property where the Administrative Services building once stood. The building serves as a Public Safety Complex and houses the RISP Patrol Bureau, Detective Bureau, Administrative Bureau, and many other specialized units. It also houses the E 9-1-1 Uniform Emergency Telephone System. The outer buildings and Coggeshall Mansion house administrative and logistical support units and are located on the same grounds as the headquarters building. Also on the grounds of the Public Safety Complex in North Scituate is the RISP Museum, which is open to the public.

The Division also maintains specialized units such as its Charitable Gaming Unit, SWAT team, Dive Team (SCUBA), Intelligence Unit, Detective Unit, Governor's Security Unit, Commercial Vehicle Enforcement Unit, Training Academy staff, K9 Team, Computer Crimes Unit, Financial Crimes Unit, Narcotics Unit, and Criminal Identification Unit as well as many other specialized units.

The Rhode Island State Police Academy is located in the town of Foster. The site was originally a United States Army Nike Missile Base which was decommissioned and turned over to the state of Rhode Island. The state then turned the facility over to the state police as the location for their new training academy.

In December 2018 troopers began using the SIG Sauer P320 chambered in 9mm to replace the older P226 DAK pistols.

Less-lethal weapons issued to Troopers include OC Pepper Spray, Tasers, and the Expandable Straight Baton.

The Rhode Island State Police achieved its initial accreditation from the Commission on Accreditation for Law Enforcement Agencies (CALEA) in 1994, and was reaccredited in 1999, 2002, 2005, 2008, and 2011. The Division achieved Flagship Status in 2005, 2008, and 2011 and received the Accreditation with Excellence Award in 2011, 2014, and 2017.

== Uniforms ==
The 1950s-era uniform of the Rhode Island State Police is unique in the United States law enforcement community. The uniform has also won best dressed in the country in previous years and in 2005, the National Association of Uniform Manufacturers and Distributors (NAUMD) presented the Rhode Island State Police with an 80th Anniversary Commemorative Uniform Award. The RISP is one of only five state police forces that do not wear a badge on their uniform shirts. Instead, they wear a set of numbers stamped in brass, placed onto a piece of black fabric, with red piping on the edges, over the left breast on the uniform shirt. However, the RISP does issue a wallet badge for off-duty use/identification. The badge is gold colored for all ranks.

Unlike most other police agencies in the US, which utilize black leather duty gear and footwear, the RISP wears leather duty gear and footwear (high boots or shoes, depending on the uniform season) that is a deep chestnut brown color, creating a very distinctive look. RISP high boots, shoes, and most of the leather duty gear is produced by the historic Dehner Boot Company of Omaha, Nebraska. The RISP also has the distinction of being one of the few, if not the only, agencies to have three seasonal uniform changes as opposed to the standard two season (summer and winter) uniform change that most agencies utilize. The three consist of the winter uniform (high boots, breeches, long sleeve shirt with Sam Browne strap), spring/fall uniform (shoes, regular uniform Pants, long-sleeve shirt with Sam Browne strap) and summer uniform (shoes, regular uniform pants, short-sleeve shirt without Sam Browne strap).

The primary colors on the State Police uniform are black and red. The epaulets worn on uniform shirts and dress blouses are black and piped in red. The stripe on the spring/fall and summer uniform pants is a wide black stripe while the striping on the winter/dress uniform breeches is a wide black stripe that is piped with a thinner red stripe. The spring/fall and summer uniform pants and shirts are a lighter charcoal gray while the winter and dress pants and shirts are a darker charcoal gray. A black tie is worn with the winter, spring/fall and dress uniforms and is tucked into the uniform shirt after the first button.

The uniform hat of the RISP is a gray straw campaign style hat for the summer and spring/fall uniforms while the winter and dress uniform hat is a tan felt campaign style hat. Both hats feature a brown leather band at the base of the hat and a gold colored hat badge mounted on a brown leather backing.

Specialized units (K-9, Tactical Unit, etc.) are authorized to wear BDU-style utility uniforms and black nylon web duty gear.

=== Rank structure ===
Title	Insignia
Colonel	
Lieutenant Colonel	
Major	
Captain	
Lieutenant	
Sergeant	
Corporal	
Trooper	

== Fallen officers ==
Since the establishment of the Rhode Island State Police, seven officers have died while on duty.

== In popular culture ==
The Rhode Island State Police won the "Best Dressed" award from the National Association of Uniform Manufacturers and Distributors (NAUMD) in 1986. On September 30, 1986, six troopers went to New York City to model the uniform on the television show Late Night with David Letterman.

== See also ==
- List of law enforcement agencies in Rhode Island
- State police
- State patrol
- Highway patrol
