= 2022 Rhode Island General Treasurer election =

- November 8, 2022
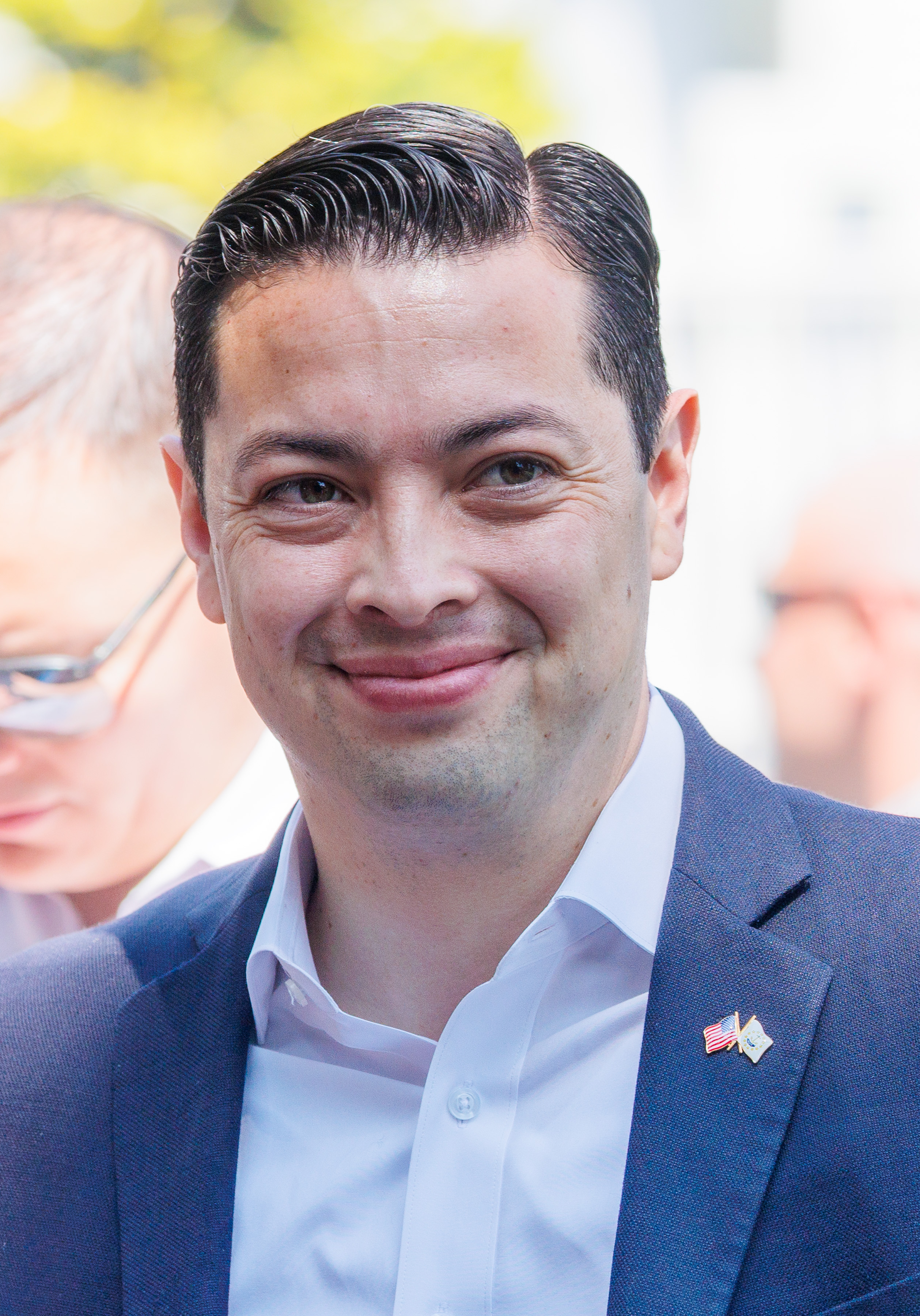

Nominee	James Diossa	James Lathrop
Party	Democratic	Republican
Popular vote	190,775	159,834
Percentage	54.3%	45.5%
- Diossa: 50–60% 60–70% 70–80% Lathrop: 50–60% 60–70%
General Treasurer before election
Seth Magaziner
Democratic
Elected General Treasurer
James Diossa
Democratic

The 2022 Rhode Island General Treasurer election took place on November 8, 2022, to elect the General Treasurer of Rhode Island.

Incumbent general treasurer Seth Magaziner was term-limited and could not seek a third term in office, initially running for governor before dropping out to run for U.S. House instead. Former two-term Democratic mayor of Central Falls James Diossa defeated Republican James Lathrop, finance director of North Kingstown.

== Democratic primary ==
=== Candidates ===
==== Nominee ====
- James Diossa, former mayor of Central Falls

==== Eliminated in primary ====
- Stefan Pryor, Rhode Island Commerce Secretary

==== Declined ====
- Marvin Abney, state representative and chairman of the House Finance Committee (endorsed Diossa)
- Nick Autiello, former advisor to former Governor of Rhode Island Gina Raimondo
- Liz Beretta-Perik, treasurer of the Rhode Island Democratic Party
- Ryan Pearson, state senator (running for re-election)
- Scott Slater, state representative (running for re-election)

=== Endorsements ===
James Diossa

Statewide politicians

- Dan McKee, Governor of Rhode Island
- Paul Tavares, former general treasurer

State legislators

- Marvin Abney, state representative
- Karen Alzate, state representative
- Jean Barros, state representative
- Sandra Cano, state senator
- Robert Craven, state representative
- Grace Diaz, state representative
- Alana DiMario, state senator
- Dawn Euer, state senator
- Leonela Felix, state representative
- Joshua Giraldo, state representative
- Meghan Kallman, state senator
- Ana Quezada, state senator
- Evan Shanley, state representative

Local politicians

- Roberto DaSilva, mayor of East Providence and former state representative
- Jorge Elorza, mayor of Providence
- Donald R. Grebien, mayor of Pawtucket
- Charles Lombardi, mayor of North Providence
- Joe Polisena, mayor of Johnston
- Angel Taveras, former mayor of Providence

Organizations

- Rhode Island Democratic Party
- Sierra Club
Stefan Pryor

State legislators

- Jacquelyn Baginski, state representative
- Stephen Casey, state representative
- Julie Casimiro, state representative
- Daniel Da Ponte, former state senator
- Kathleen Fogarty, state representative
- Daniel Issa, former state senator
- Brian Patrick Kennedy, speaker pro tempore of the Rhode Island House of Representatives
- Jan Malik, former state representative
- Michael Morin, former state representative
- Robert Phillips, state representative
- Roger Picard, state senator
- Patricia Serpa, state representative
- June Speakman, state representative
- Camille Vella-Wilkinson, state representative
- Anastasia Williams, state representative

Local officials

- Pam Azar, Lincoln town councilwoman
- Lisa Baldelli-Hunt, mayor of Woonsocket
- William Foley, Warwick city councilman
- Elizabeth Fuerte, Newport city councilwoman
- Joh Igliozzi, president of the Providence City Council
- Michael Kinch, Cumberland town council president
- Jeanne Marie Napolitano, mayor of Newport

Labor unions

- International Brotherhood of Teamsters Local 251

=== Debate ===
2022 Rhode Island General Treasurer Democratic primary debate
No.	Date	Host	Moderator	Link	Democratic	Democratic
Key: P Participant A Absent N Not invited I Invited W Withdrawn						
Key: P Participant A Absent N Not invited I Invited W Withdrawn					James Diossa	Stefan Pryor
1	Aug. 5, 2022	WPRI-TV	Ted Nesi; Tim White	YouTube	P	P

=== Polling ===
Poll source	Date(s) administered	Sample size (Note: Key: A – all adults RV – registered voters LV – likely voters V – unclear)	Margin of error	James Diossa	Stefan Pryor	Undecided
Fleming & Associates	August 7–10, 2022	405 (LV)	± 4.9%	18%	17%	61%

=== Results ===
Democratic primary results
Party	Candidate	Votes	%
Democratic	James Diossa	58,335	55.55%
Democratic	Stefan Pryor	46,675	44.45%
Total votes		105,010	100.0%

== Republican primary ==
=== Candidates ===
==== Nominee ====
- James Lathrop, North Kingstown finance director

==== Declined ====
- Allan Fung, former mayor of Cranston and nominee for Governor of Rhode Island in 2014 and 2018 (ran for U.S. House)

=== Endorsements ===
James Lathrop

Local officials

- Robert Flanders, former justice of the Rhode Island Supreme Court (1996–2004)

Organizations

- ADSCME Council 94

Newspapers

- Warwick Beacon

=== Results ===
Republican primary results
Party	Candidate	Votes	%
Republican	James Lathrop	18,477	100.0%
Total votes		18,477	100.0%

== General election ==
=== Forum and debate ===
2022 Rhode Island General Treasurer candidate forum & debate
No.	Date	Host	Moderator	Link	Democratic	Republican
Key: P Participant A Absent N Not invited I Invited W Withdrawn						
Key: P Participant A Absent N Not invited I Invited W Withdrawn					James Diossa	James Lanthrop
1		North Kingstown; High School		YouTube	P	P
2	Nov. 4, 2022	WPRI-TV	Ted Nesi; Tim White	YouTube	P	P

=== Results ===
2022 Rhode Island General Treasurer election
Party	Candidate	Votes	%	±%
Democratic	James Diossa	190,775	54.33%	−10.57%
Republican	James Lathrop	159,834	45.51%	+10.56%
Write-in		555	0.16%	+0.01%
Total votes		351,164	100.0%	
Democratic hold				

==== By county ====
	James Diossa Democratic		James Lathrop Republican		Others	
County	Votes	%	Votes	%	Votes	%
Bristol	11,516	57.2%	8,588	42.66%	28	0.14%
Kent	32,970	48.95%	34,280	50.89%	110	0.16%
Newport	18,279	57.82%	13,312	42.11%	24	0.08%
Providence	98,651	56.59%	75,340	43.22%	340	0.2%
Washington	29,359	50.86%	28,314	49.05%	53	0.09%

Counties that flipped from Democratic to Republican

- Kent (largest city: Warwick)

==== By congressional district ====
Diossa won both congressional districts.

District	Diossa	Lathrop	Representative
1st	59%	41%	David Cicilline
2nd	51%	49%	James Langevin (117th Congress)
2nd	51%	49%	Seth Magaziner (118th Congress)
