= List of Italian-American politicians by state =

To be included in this list, the person must have a Wikipedia article showing they are Italian American politician or must have references showing they are of Italian descent and are notable.

== Arizona ==
- Dennis DeConcini
- Joe Arpaio, Sheriff of Maricopa County
- Rick Renzi
- Janet Napolitano, former governor of Arizona, former Secretary of Homeland Security

== California ==
- Joseph Alioto
- Sonny Bono
- Vic Fazio
- Doug LaMalfa (b. 1960)
- Kevin McCarthy
- George Moscone
- George Miller
- Leon Panetta, (b. 1938), former White House Chief of Staff to Bill Clinton
- Jimmy Panetta, (b. 1969),
- Mike Gatto, state assemblyman
- Christine Pelosi
- Nancy Pelosi
- James Rogan
- Angelo Rossi
- Mike Thompson

== Colorado ==
- Diana DeGette
- Kirstjen Nielsen
- Angie Paccione
- Dana Perino, White House Press Secretary
- Tom Tancredo

== Connecticut ==
- Francesca Braggiotti
- Sam Caligiuri
- David Cappiello
- Albert W. Cretella
- Emilio Q. Daddario
- Rosa DeLauro
- Louis DeLuca
- John DeStefano, Jr.
- Biagio DiLieto
- Michael Fedele
- Attilio R. Frassinelli
- Robert Giaimo
- Philip Giordano
- Ella Grasso
- Albert P. Morano
- Charles J. Prestia

== Delaware ==
- Caesar Rodney

== Florida ==
- Dan Mica
- John Mica
- Dave Weldon
- John J. Considine
- Ron DeSantis
- Darren Soto
- Anthony Sabatini

== Illinois ==
- Jerry Costello
- Donald A. Manzullo
- Frank Olivo
- Charles Panici
- Martin Russo

== Kansas ==
- Mike Pompeo, United States Secretary of State

== Kentucky ==
- Romano L. Mazzoli, former congressman from Louisville
- Daniel Mongiardo, Lieutenant Governor

== Louisiana ==
- Mary Landrieu, Senator
- Steve Scalise, United States representative
- Victor H. Schiro

== Maine ==
- John Baldacci

== Maryland ==
- Thomas L. J. D'Alesandro, Jr.
- Nino Mangione
- Connie Morella
- William Paca

== Massachusetts ==
- Mike Capuano
- Paul Cellucci
- John Cogliano
- Silvio O. Conte
- Foster Furcolo
- John F. Kelly
- Clementina Langone
- Frederick C. Langone
- Michael LoPresti Jr.
- Joe Malone
- Thomas Menino
- Joe Moakley
- Richard Tisei
- John A. Volpe

== Michigan ==
- Kerry Bentivolio - U.S. Representative.
- George Anthony Dondero - U.S. Representative.
- Robert A. Ficano

== Minnesota ==
- Jim Oberstar
- Bruce Vento

== Mississippi ==
- Travis Childers
- Thad Cochran
- Andrew H. Longino
- Steven Palazzo
- Chip Pickering

== Montana ==
- Greg Gianforte
- Vince Ricci

== Nevada ==
- Mark Amodei
- Kathy Augustine
- Elizabeth Helgelien
- John Ensign
- Adam Laxalt
- Joe Lombardo
- Catherine Cortez Masto

== New Hampshire ==
- Lou D'Allesandro
- Kathleen Sgambati

== New Jersey ==
- Hugh Joseph Addonizio
- Joseph Azzolina
- Basil B. Bruno
- Anthony Bucco
- Barbara Buono
- James Cafiero
- Dominic A. Cavicchia
- Peter A. Cavicchia
- Jack Ciattarelli
- Jon Corzine
- Chris Christie
- Marion Crecco
- Donald Cresitello
- Anthony R. Cucci
- Donald DiFrancesco
- Mike Ferguson
- James Florio
- Buddy Fortunato
- Garry Furnari
- S. Thomas Gagliano
- Thomas Gangemi
- John Girgenti
- Frank Joseph Guarini
- Anthony Imperiale
- Frank LoBiondo
- Joseph J. Maraziti
- Joseph P. Merlino
- Carl Orechio
- Carmen A. Orechio
- Frank Pallone
- Bill Pascrell, Jr.
- Joseph Pennacchio
- Peter Rodino
- Marge Roukema
- Anthony Russo
- Paul Sarlo
- Joseph Suliga
- Robert Torricelli
- Ralph A. Villani

== New Mexico ==
- Joseph Carraro
- Pete Domenici

== New York ==
- Joseph P. Addabbo
- Sal Albanese
- Al D'Amato
- Luigi Antonini
- Victor Anfuso
- Rob Astorino
- Vito P. Battista
- Joe Borelli
- Ann Marie Buerkle
- Joseph A. Califano Jr.
- Louis Capozzoli
- John C. Montana
- Bruce F. Caputo
- George A. Cincotta
- Maria Cino
- Andrew Cuomo
- Mario Cuomo
- Bill de Blasio
- Carmine DeSapio (1908–2004) the last head of the Tammany Hall political machine that was active in New York politics for 150 years, and dominated them for 80 years
- Thomas DiNapoli
- Joseph J. DioGuardi
- Geraldine Ferraro
- Vito Fossella
- Dan Frisa
- Anthony Gaeta
- Jarett Gandolfo
- Andrew Garbarino
- James F. Gennaro
- Eric Gioia
- Rudolph Giuliani
- Tom Golisano
- Michael Grimm
- Felix Grucci
- Vincent R. Impellitteri
- John LaFalce
- Fiorello La Guardia
- Ralph J. Lamberti
- Andrew Lanza
- Rick Lazio
- Sebastian Leone
- Michael LiPetri
- Vito Lopez
- Dan Maffei
- Anthony Masiello
- Vito Marcantonio
- Guy Molinari
- Susan Molinari
- Carl Paladino
- Phil Palmesano
- George Pataki
- Ferdinand Pecora
- Charles Poletti
- Tom Sanzillo
- Diane Savino
- Anthony Scaramucci
- Curtis Sliwa
- Al Smith
- Francis Barretto Spinola
- Elise Stefanik
- Tom Suozzi U.S. Representative from New York's 3rd congressional district
- Peter Vallone Sr.
- Italo Zanzi

== North Carolina ==
- Virginia Foxx

== Ohio ==
- Capri Cafaro
- Anthony Celebrezze
- Anthony J. Celebrezze Jr.
- Richard Celeste
- Michael DiSalle (1908 - 1981) served as the 60th Governor of Ohio
- Frank LaRose
- Jim Renacci
- Michael Rulli
- Tim Ryan
- Pat Tiberi
- James Traficant
- Brad Wenstrup

== Oregon ==
- Peter DeFazio
- Suzanne Bonamici

== Pennsylvania ==
- Lou Barletta, U.S. Congressman, former mayor of Hazleton
- Robert A. Brady, U.S. congressman
- Italo Cappabianca, former state representative
- Frank Carlucci, U.S. Secretary of Defense, chairman emeritus of the Carlyle Group.
- Chris Deluzio, U.S. Congressman
- Michael F. Doyle, congressman (Italian mother, maiden name Fusco)
- Larry Farnese, attorney and state senator
- Vincent Fumo, former state senator, former Democratic State Senate Appropriations Chairman
- Melissa Hart, former U.S. congresswoman (Italian mother, Albina Simone)
- Frank Mascara, former U.S. congressman
- Doug Mastriano, State Senator
- Tom Marino, U.S. Congressman
- Robert J. Mellow, state senator, Minority Leader (Italian mother, maiden name Generotti)
- John Murtha U.S. congressman (deceased)
- Russell M. Nigro, retired State Supreme Court justice
- Jeffrey Piccola, state senator, chair of State Government Committee
- Frank Rizzo, former mayor of Philadelphia
- Rick Saccone, former state representative
- Rick Santorum, former U.S. Senator
- Louis J. Tullio, former mayor of Erie
- Michael Eakin, former PA Supreme Court Justice (Italian mother)

== Rhode Island ==
- Gina Raimondo
- Gregg Amore
- Dennis Algiere
- Samuel Azzinaro
- Dennis Canario
- David Caprio
- Frank T. Caprio
- Donald Carcieri
- Vincent Cianci, Jr
- Frank Ciccone
- David Cicilline
- Arthur Corvese
- Gregory Costantino
- Daniel Da Ponte
- John DeSimone
- Christopher Del Sesto
- Louis DiPalma
- Edward D. DiPrete
- Deborah Fellela
- Frank Ferri
- Antonio Giarrusso
- Frank Lombardi
- John J. Lombardi
- Frank Lombardo
- Michael Marcello
- Michael Napolitano
- Philip Noel
- John Notte
- Christopher Ottiano
- Peter Palumbo
- John Orlando Pastore
- Dominick J. Ruggerio
- Deborah Ruggiero
- William San Bento
- Teresa Tanzi
- Stephen Ucci

== Texas ==
- Nick Lampson
- Aldo Tatangelo
- Giovanni Capriglione
- Ted Cruz
- Matt Rinaldi

== Vermont ==
- Patrick Leahy

== Washington ==
- Nick Licata
- Mike Pellicciotti
- Albert Rosellini
- Dino Rossi

== West Virginia ==
- Joe Manchin

== Wyoming ==
- John Barrasso
- Teno Roncalio
- Tom Sansonetti

== See also ==
- List of Italian Americans
