= State of the State (TV series) =

American political talk show

State of the State is a public affairs and political talk show, in a studio setting, hosted by John Carlevale and others. The subject matter varies greatly, but the topics are primarily related to the politics of Rhode Island.

The show employs two formats: the primary format is interview-style produced in the studio with a host and one or more guests. Guests are either public officials or private citizens speaking about timely topics of public interest. The second format is to present events of public interest which occur outside of the studio, such as public hearings, public meetings, or Operation Clean Government-sponsored events, including Annual Meetings, educational forums, and biennial Candidate Schools.

== History ==
The show was created by John Carlevale, Joe Devine, Don Gill, and Robert Plante in 1992 in the wake of the credit union crisis (45 banks and credit unions in the state closed due to the collapse of their private insurer, the Rhode Island Share and Deposit Indemnity Corporation (RISDIC)). From 2001 to 2012 Operation Clean Government, a Rhode Island government watchdog group, sponsored the show. In 2012 State of the State Communications, the original sponsor of the television show, was reincorporated and resumed sponsorship.

State of the State is taped at a PEG-RI (the Public, educational, and government access (PEG) cable TV channel provider) studio in Providence, Rhode Island on a bi-weekly basis. Shows are recorded in realtime (live-to-tape format) which means that the television show is recorded as if it were on live television, with no video editing of the content in the show.

The show is sent to the statewide playback location at PEG-RI and distributed to the cable television providers of Rhode Island.

== Broadcasting ==
The show airs in Rhode Island on:

- Cox Communications cable channel 13, Verizon FiOS channel 32, and i3 Broadband Channel 13 on Saturdays at 11:00pm and Sundays at 8:00am.
- Cox Communications cable channel 18, Verizon FiOS channel 32, and i3 Broadband Channel 18 on Mondays at 9:00pm and Thursdays at 9:00pm.

== Awards received ==
At the 2009 PEG-RI Awards, State of the State received a special recognition award for an episode hosted by Ian Lonngren and produced by John Carlevale - an interview of freshman Rhode Island legislators.

At the 2011 Rhode Island PEG Awards, State of the State received a PEG Award for Best Public Service Announcement.

At the 2012 Rhode Island PEG Awards, State of the State received a Special Recognition Award for Best Political/Community Issues Program for its production of “RI Primary Elections Results.”

== Guests ==
Some of State of the State's guests include:

Rhode Island state and municipal officials

Donald Carcieri, Governor
Frank T. Caprio, General Treasurer
A. Ralph Mollis, Secretary of State
Elizabeth Roberts, Lt. Governor
David Cicilline, Democratic mayor of Providence
Marc Cote, Democratic State Senator, District 24
Laurence Ehrhardt, Republican State Representative and Deputy Minority Whip, District 32
Allan Fung, Republican mayor of Cranston
Daniel J. McKee, Democratic mayor of Cumberland
Leo Raptakis, Democratic State Senator, District 33
James Sheehan, Democratic State Senator, District 36
Robert A. Watson, Republican State Representative and Minority Leader, District 30
Timothy Williamson, Democratic State Representative, District 25

former Rhode Island federal, state, and municipal officials

U.S. Senator Lincoln Chafee
Governor Bruce Sundlun
Lt. Governor Roger Begin
Lt. Governor Charles J. Fogarty
Supreme Court Justice Robert Flanders
Attorney General Arlene Violet
Attorney General Sheldon Whitehouse
Secretary of State William Inman
Secretary of State Barbara Leonard
Mayor Steve Laffey of Cranston

Media

Edward Achorn, Providence Journal editor
M. Charles Bakst, former Providence Journal political columnist
Mike Stanton, Providence Journal journalist

Others

John Marion, executive director of Common Cause Rhode Island
Philip West, former executive director of Common Cause Rhode Island
Chief Sachem Matthew Thomas of the Narragansett tribe
Ken Block, Chairman of the Moderate Party

== Hosts ==
- Joe Devine, the original host (retired)
- John Carlevale, second and longest-serving host
- Anne Gardner; Ian Lonngren; Carol Mumford; Roy Pruett and Barry Schiller are more recent members of the host team.

== Guest hosts ==
State of the State's guest hosts through the years have included:

Robert Arruda, former Operation Clean Government Chairman
Spencer Dickinson, a Rhode Island State Representative
Andy Galli
Anne Gardner
Bruce R. Lang, co-founder of Operation Clean Government and first OCG Chairman
Frank Lennon
Elizabeth Ann Leonard
Ian Lonngren
Victor Moffitt
Carol Mumford, a former Rhode Island State Representative
John Patterson
Barry Schiller
Harry Staley, co-founder of Rhode Island Statewide Coalition
Larry Valencia, former president of Operation Clean Government and a Rhode Island State Representative
