= 2026 Rhode Island General Treasurer election =

- November 3, 2026
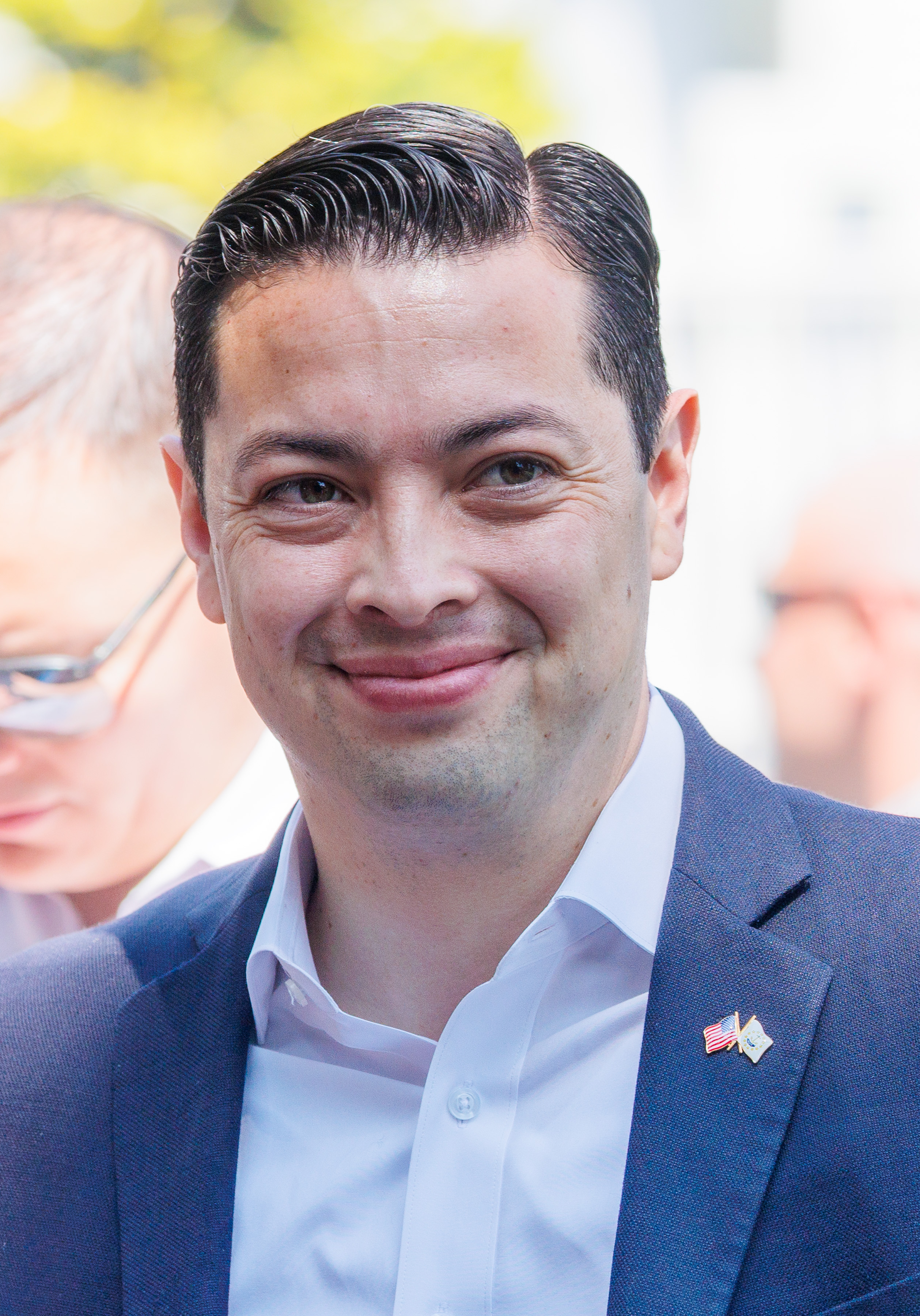

Nominee	James Diossa	Micholas Credle
Party	Democratic	Republican
General Treasurer before election
James Diossa
Democratic
Elected General Treasurer
James Diossa
Democratic

The 2026 Rhode Island General Treasurer election was held on November 3, 2026, to elect the Rhode Island General Treasurer. Primary elections were held on September 9, 2026.

Incumbent Democratic general treasurer James Diossa, who was first elected in 2022 with 54.3% of the vote, won re-election to a second term in office.

== Democratic primary ==
=== Candidates ===
==== Nominee ====
- James Diossa, incumbent state treasurer

=== Endorsements ===
James Diossa

Labor unions

- National Education Association Rhode Island

Organizations

- Planned Parenthood Votes! Rhode Island

=== Results ===
Democratic primary results
Party	Candidate	Votes	%
Democratic	James Diossa (incumbent)	106,354	100.0
Total votes		106,354	100.0

== Republican primary ==
=== Candidates ===
==== Nominee ====
- Micholas Credle, United States Army veteran

=== Results ===
Republican primary results
Party	Candidate	Votes	%
Republican	Micholas Credle	20,342	100.0
Total votes		20,342	100.0

== General election ==
=== Results ===
2026 Rhode Island General Treasurer election
Party	Candidate	Votes	%	±%
Democratic	James Diossa (incumbent)			
Republican	Micholas A. Credle			
Write-in				
Total votes			100.0	
