= Elizabeth Crowley (Rhode Island politician) =

American politician (born 1951)

Member of the Rhode Island Senate from the 16th district
- In office January 2009 – January 5, 2021
- Preceded by: Daniel Issa
- Succeeded by: Jonathon Acosta

Personal details
- Born: October 22, 1951 (age 74)
- Party: Democratic
- Education: Salve Regina University

Elizabeth A. Crowley (born on October 22, 1951) is an American politician and former Democratic member of the Rhode Island Senate representing District 16 between 2009 and 2021.

== Education ==
Crowley graduated and earned a degree from Salve Regina University.

== Elections ==
2012 Crowley was challenged by former state Representative Joseph Moran in the September 11, 2012 Democratic Primary; Crowley won with 1,189 votes (67.8%), and won the November 6, 2012 General election with 4,616 votes (89.7%) against Moderate candidate Nicholas Gelfuso.

2008 Crowley challenged District 16 incumbent Senator Daniel Issa in the September 9, 2008 Democratic Primary, winning with 1,162 votes (62.4%), and won the November 4, 2008 General election with 4,575 votes (86.7%) against Republican nominee Albert Larivee.

2010 Crowley was challenged by former Senator Issa in the September 23, 2010 Democratic Primary; Crowley won with 1,084 votes (55.1%), and won the November 2, 2010 General election with 2,521 votes (75.2%) against Republican nominee Ernest Cabral, who had run for House seats in 2002 and 2004.
