= 1996 United States Senate election in Rhode Island =

- November 5, 1996
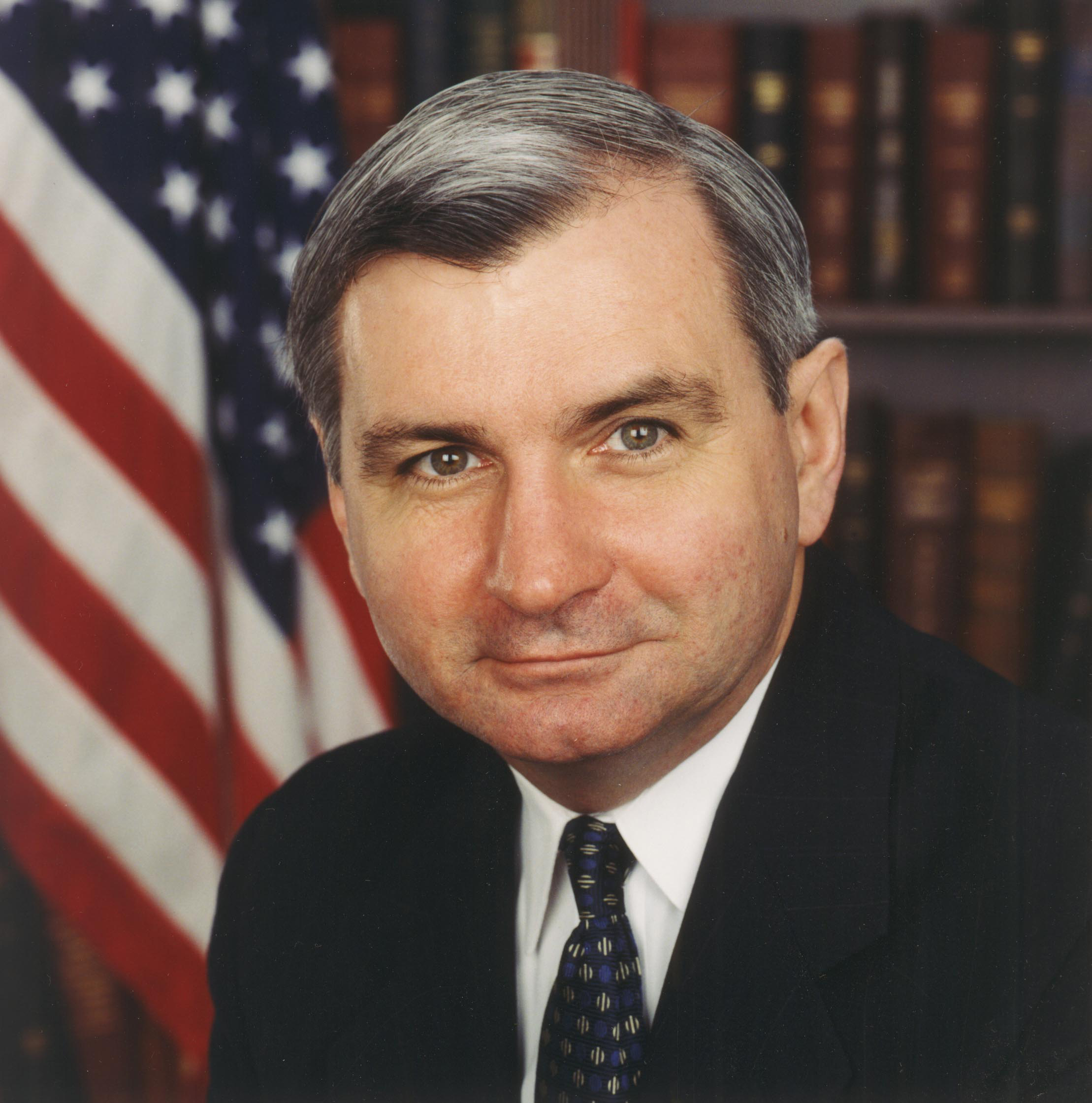

Nominee	Jack Reed	Nancy Mayer
Party	Democratic	Republican
Popular vote	230,676	127,368
Percentage	63.31%	34.96%
- Reed: 40–50% 50–60% 60–70% 70–80% Mayer: 40–50% 50–60%
U.S. senator before election
Claiborne Pell
Democratic
Elected U.S. Senator
Jack Reed
Democratic

The 1996 United States Senate election in Rhode Island took place on November 5, 1996. Incumbent Democratic U.S. Senator Claiborne Pell decided to retire. Democratic nominee U.S. Representative Jack Reed won the open seat.

== Democratic primary ==
=== Candidates ===
- Jack Reed, U.S. Representative
- Donald Gill

=== Results ===
Democratic primary results
Party	Candidate	Votes	%
Democratic	Jack Reed	59,336	86.13%
Democratic	Donald Gill	9,554	13.87%
Total votes		68,890	100.00%

== Republican primary ==
=== Candidates ===
- Nancy Mayer, Treasurer of Rhode Island
- Thomas R. Post, Jr.
- Theodore Leonard

=== Results ===
Republican primary results
Party	Candidate	Votes	%
Republican	Nancy Mayer	11,600	77.47%
Republican	Thomas R. Post, Jr.	2,302	15.37%
Republican	Theodore Leonard	1,072	7.16%
Total votes		14,974	100.00%

== General election ==
=== Candidates ===
- Donald Lovejoy (I)
- Nancy Mayer (R), Treasurer of Rhode Island
- Jack Reed (D), U.S. Representative

=== Results ===
General election results
Party	Candidate	Votes	%	±%
Democratic	Jack Reed	230,676	63.31%	+1.48%
Republican	Nancy Mayer	127,368	34.96%	−3.21%
Independent	Donald W. Lovejoy	6,327	1.74%	
Majority		103,308	28.35%	+4.69%
Turnout		364,371		
Democratic hold		Swing		

== See also ==
- 1996 United States Senate elections
