= Frank Caprio =

American municipal judge (1936–2025)

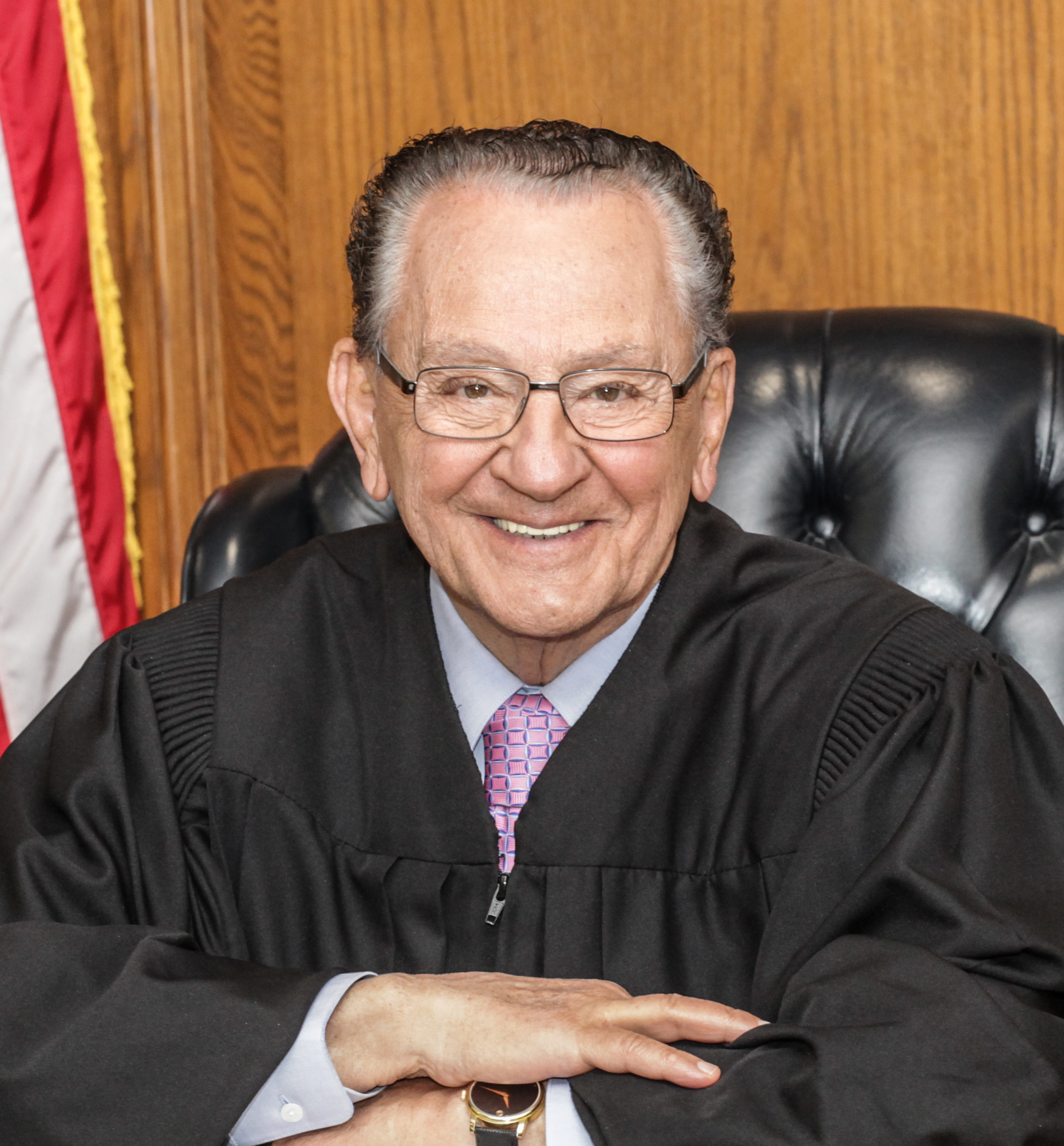
- Caprio in 2018

Chief Judge of the Providence Municipal Court
- In office 1985–2023
- Appointed by: Joseph R. Paolino Jr.
- Succeeded by: John J. Lombardi

Member of the Providence City Council
- In office 1962–1968

Personal details
- Born: Francesco Caprio; November 24, 1936 Providence, Rhode Island, U.S.
- Died: August 20, 2025 (aged 88) Providence, Rhode Island, U.S.
- Resting place: St. Ann Cemetery, Cranston, Rhode Island
- Party: Democratic
- Spouse: Joyce Tibaldi (m. 1965)
- Children: 5, including Frank and David
- Education: Providence College (BA); Suffolk University (JD)

Military service
- Branch: United States Army; Rhode Island Army National Guard
- Service years: 1954–1962
- Unit: 876th Combat Engineer Battalion

Francesco Caprio (November 24, 1936 – August 20, 2025) was an American judge and politician who served as the chief judge of the municipal court of Providence, Rhode Island, and chairman of the Rhode Island Board of Governors for Higher Education. His judicial work was televised on the program Caught in Providence. He also made appearances in the series Parking Wars, adjudicating several cases of traffic violations. The Caught in Providence YouTube channel has 2.92 million subscribers. In 2017, his videos in the courtroom went viral, with more than 15 million views. By 2022, views of Caught in Providence neared 500 million. He became well known for his empathy and light humor in court. A Democrat, Caprio served on the Providence City Council in the 1960s and unsuccessfully ran for both Lieutenant Governor and Attorney General.

== Early life and education ==
Francesco Caprio was born in the Italian-American neighborhood of Federal Hill, Providence, the second of three sons of Antonio "Tup" Caprio, an immigrant from Teano, Italy, and Filomena Caprio (née Dello Iacono), a Providence native whose family had immigrated from Naples, Italy.

Caprio's father, a fruit peddler and milkman, was a major influence in his life, firmly teaching his children to study and be compassionate to the poor, and continuing to be a "powerful presence" during his son's work as a judge. In his later years, Tup worked as a psychologist, being a published author on social psychology.

Caprio attended Providence public schools while working as a dishwasher and shoe-shiner. He graduated from Central High School, where he won the state title in wrestling in 1953. He earned a bachelor's degree in 1958 from Providence College, a Catholic university founded by the Dominican Order. After graduating, he began teaching American government at Hope High School in Providence. While teaching at Hope, Caprio attended night school at the Suffolk University School of Law in Boston, earning his Juris Doctor degree in 1965.

Caprio also served in the Rhode Island Army National Guard from 1954 to 1962 in the 876th Combat Engineer Battalion. Caprio was assigned to Camp Varnum in Narragansett, Rhode Island and Fort Indiantown Gap in East Hanover Township, Pennsylvania.

== Political career ==
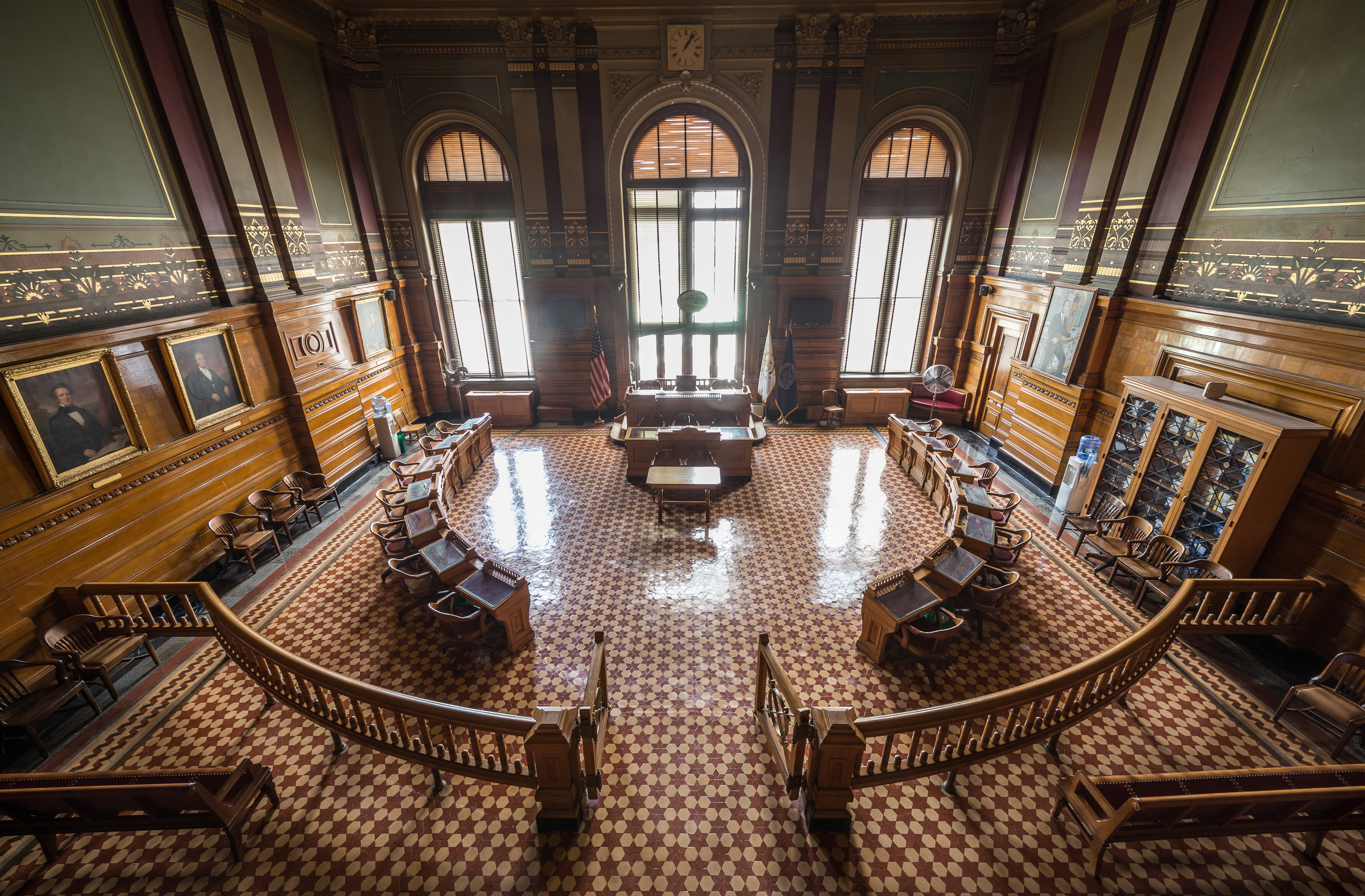
Chambers of the Providence City Council

Caprio was elected to the Providence City Council in 1962 and served until 1968. He represented the city's 13th ward. He faced a Democratic primary challenge for re-election in 1966 against Joseph L. Luongo in an election race which got heated enough that a mass brawl between as many as 400 supporters of the two candidates broke out in the Federal Hill neighborhood in September 1966 requiring twenty-five policemen to break-up. While on the council, Caprio chaired the Committee on Urban Redevelopment, Renewal and Planning. His committee investigated allegations that the city's anti-poverty agency, Progress for Providence, was improperly allocating its funds.

Caprio sought the Democratic nomination for Lieutenant Governor of Rhode Island in 1968. The party instead nominated J. Joseph Garrahy. Caprio unsuccessfully ran as the Democratic nominee for attorney general of Rhode Island in 1970, losing the general election to Republican nominee Richard J. Israel, with Israel receiving 56.7% of the vote to Caprio's 43.3%. Caprio was elected as a delegate to the Rhode Island Constitutional Convention in 1975. He was also elected as a delegate to five Democratic National Conventions. He chaired the Rhode Island Board of Governors for Higher Education, which controls major decisions for the University of Rhode Island, Rhode Island College and Community College of Rhode Island.

During the 1976 Democratic presidential primaries, Caprio served as the Rhode Island state chairman for the campaign of California Governor Jerry Brown. Brown had declared his candidacy too late to compete in Rhode Island's primary, but his campaign was still seeking to secure the election and support of a slate of uncommitted delegates from the state.

== Judge of the Providence Municipal Court ==
From 1985 to 2023, Caprio served as a Providence Municipal Court Judge. Caprio released his book Compassion in the Court on February 4, 2025. He portrayed himself in the second season of the Showtime TV series Brotherhood, whose setting is based in Providence, Rhode Island.

=== Caught in Providence ===
Parts of the proceedings over which he presided, featuring low-level citations, ran for more than two decades on local television. Caprio's TV series, Caught in Providence, originated on PEG access television in Rhode Island in 1988 and was later picked up by ABC station WLNE-TV in 2000, initially airing late on Saturday nights. After a hiatus, Caught in Providence returned in 2015 and aired after the 11 o'clock newscasts on Saturdays until September 2017. Clips from this show went viral in the 2010s, starting with one about Caprio's reaction to a parking ticket issued 2 seconds before permissibility. The program also received coverage from media organizations around the world, such as NBC News. On September 24, 2018, Caught in Providence went into national syndication. The show was renewed for a second season of syndication in January 2019. Caught in Providence was produced by Caprio's brother Joe Caprio, who has stated that the show would cease filming with Caprio's retirement. Fifty episodes are consolidated into a single season and made available on Prime Video.

In 2017, his videos in the courtroom went viral, with more than 15 million views. In 2022, views of Caught in Providence neared 500 million, and one video shared on Pulptastic had 43.6 million views on YouTube. He became well known for his empathy and light humor in court. The Caught in Providence YouTube channel has 2.92 million subscribers. Caprio also made appearances in the series Parking Wars, adjudicating several cases of traffic violations.

== Community outreach ==
At Suffolk University School of Law, Caprio founded the Antonio "Tup" Caprio Scholarship Fund. This scholarship, named after Caprio's father, who had only a fifth-grade education, is for Rhode Island students committed to improving access to legal services in Rhode Island urban core neighborhoods. He also established scholarships at Providence College, Suffolk Law School, and for graduates of Central High School, named in honor of his father.

Caprio was involved in the Boys Town of Italy, the Nickerson House Juvenile Court, and Rhode Island Food Bank. In 1983 he co-chaired the Rhode Island Statue of Liberty Foundation (raising funds for the restoration of the Statue of Liberty and Ellis Island). Caprio was also a member of the Board of Regents of Elementary and Secondary education and the Governor's Pre-K through 16 Council on education. He was a member of the President's Council at Providence College.

== Awards and honors ==
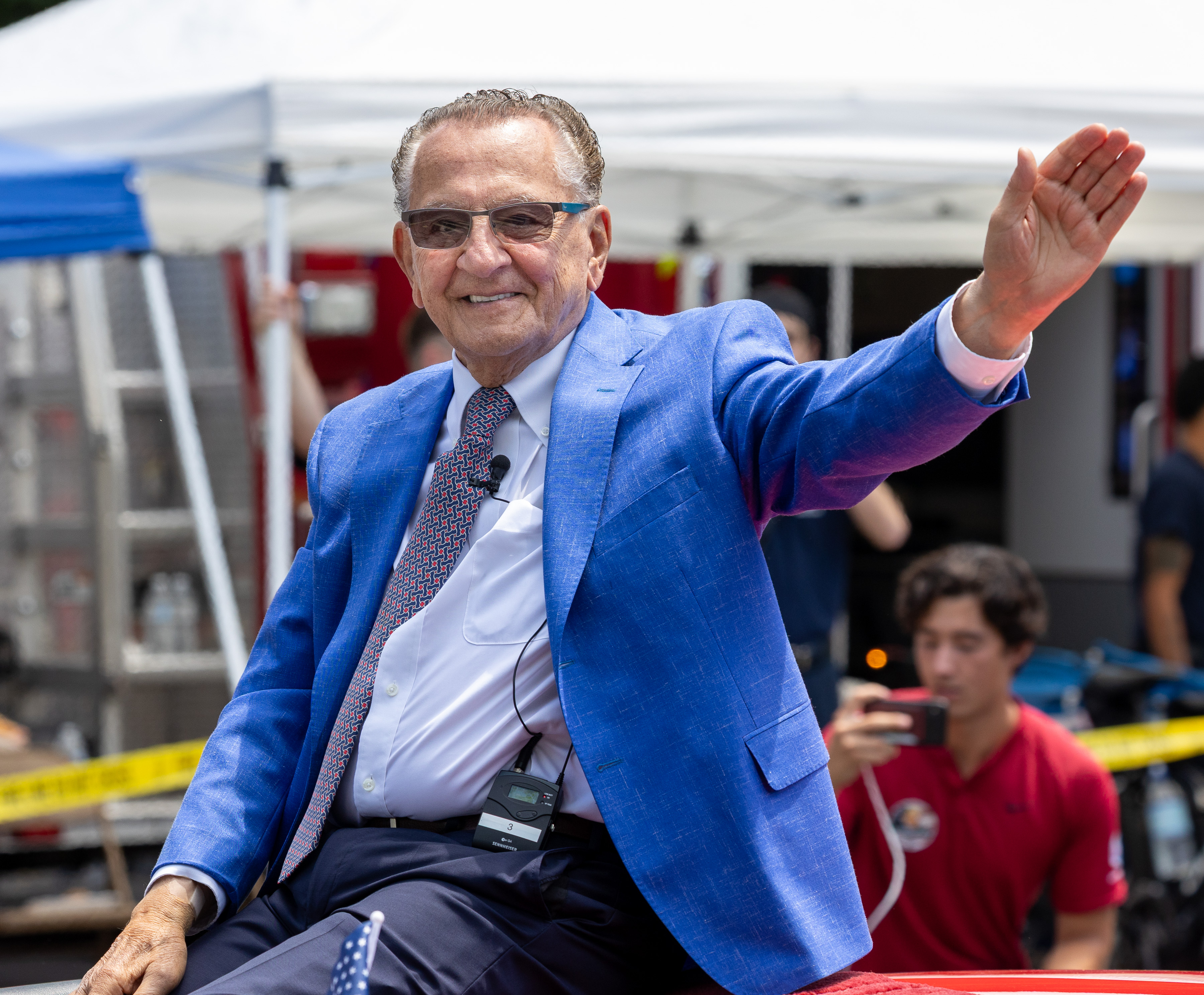
Caprio at the 2021 Bristol Fourth of July Parade

Caprio was awarded an Honorary Doctorate of Law by his alma mater Suffolk University Law School in 1991 and Providence College in 2008, and also received an Honorary Doctorate of Public Service from the University of Rhode Island in 2016. In August 2018, he received the Producer's Circle Award at the Rhode Island International Film Festival.

Following Caprio's retirement, the Providence City Council passed legislation to rename his former municipal courtroom 'The Chief Judge Frank Caprio Courtroom'. The dedication ceremony took place on October 20, 2023. Earlier that month he was sworn in as Chief Judge Emeritus of the Providence Municipal Court, although the title was largely ceremonial and Caprio stated that he had no intention of returning to the bench.

== Personal life ==
Caprio was married to Joyce E. Caprio (née Tibaldi). They had five children: Frank, David, Marissa, John, and Paul, as well as seven grandchildren and two great-grandchildren. An avid Boston Red Sox fan, Caprio threw the ceremonial first pitch on July 25, 2019, at Fenway Park, when the Red Sox played the New York Yankees. He was Catholic.

Caprio was a partner in the Coast Guard House Restaurant in Narragansett, Rhode Island.

== Illness and death ==
On December 6, 2023, Caprio announced that he had been diagnosed with pancreatic cancer. He completed his final round of radiation treatment in May 2024.

On August 19, 2025, he posted on social media from his hospital bed, stating that he had been admitted following a health setback. Caprio died the following day, at the age of 88.

His funeral took place on August 29, at Cathedral of Saints Peter and Paul in Providence, and was live streamed on social media. He is buried at St. Ann Cemetery in Cranston, Rhode Island.

Party political offices
Preceded by Anthony Brosco	Democratic nominee for Attorney General of Rhode Island; 1970	Succeeded by Dominic Cresto
