= OCG =

OCG may refer to:

- Operation Clean Government, a citizens' lobby and advocacy organization in the United States
- Orchestre de chambre de Genève, a Swiss orchestra
- City of Granada Orchestra (Orquesta Ciudad de Granada), a Spanish orchestra
- Organized crime group
- Orthodox Church of the Gauls
- Occipital gyri (OcG), a structure in the brain
