= James Diossa =

American politician (born 1985)

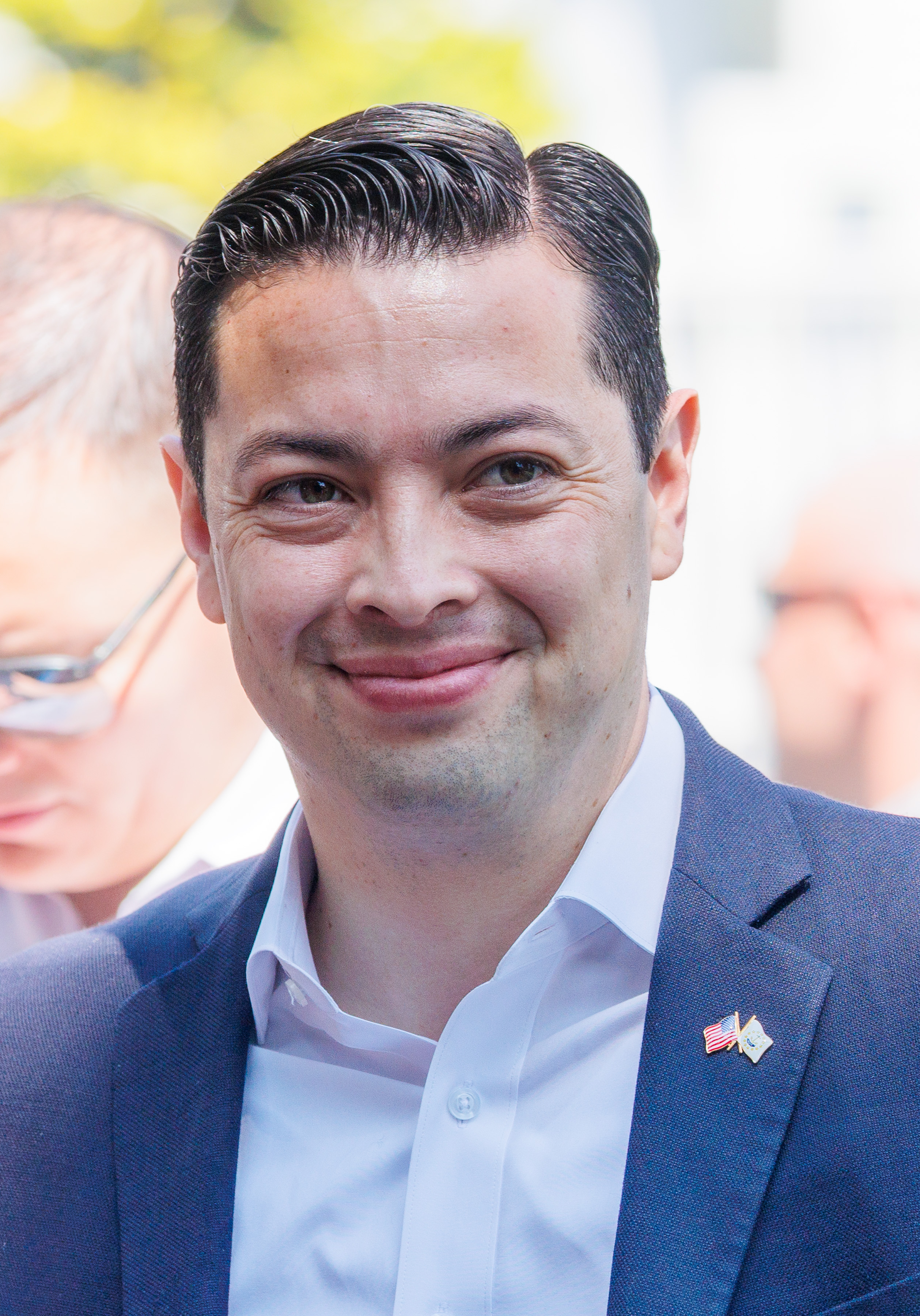
- Diossa in 2023

32nd Treasurer of Rhode Island
- Incumbent
- Assumed office January 3, 2023
- Governor: Dan McKee; Helena Foulkes (elect)
- Preceded by: Seth Magaziner

Mayor of Central Falls
- In office January 1, 2013 – January 3, 2021
- Preceded by: Charles Moreau
- Succeeded by: Maria Rivera

Personal details
- Born: 1985 (age 40–41) Central Falls, Rhode Island, U.S.
- Party: Democratic
- Domestic partner: Sandra Cano
- Children: 2
- Education: Community College of Rhode Island (attended); Becker College (BA)

James A. Diossa (born 1985) is an American politician from Rhode Island. A member of the Democratic Party, he is the Rhode Island general treasurer. He served as a member of the city council and as mayor of Central Falls, Rhode Island, guiding the city after it declared bankruptcy.

== Early life and education ==
Diossa's parents were from Medellín, Colombia. They immigrated to the United States, settling in Central Falls, Rhode Island, in 1983. He was born there two years later. His father works for Osram Sylvania. His parents separated and his mother returned to Colombia.

Diossa attended Central Falls High School, where he played for the school's soccer team and won a state championship. He graduated in 2003 and enrolled at Community College of Rhode Island. earned his undergraduate degree in criminal justice from Becker College in 2009, becoming the first member of his family to graduate from college. He also played soccer at Becker.

== Career ==
Inspired by Barack Obama's 2008 presidential campaign and an undergraduate course on government, Diossa interned for U.S. Senator Sheldon Whitehouse. He ran for election to the city council of Central Falls in November 2009 and won a seat by 17 votes, becoming the youngest city councilor in Central Falls' history. With a $6 million budget deficit and the city's pension fund underfunded by $80 million, the city went into receivership and filed for bankruptcy in August 2011. The city's only public library closed, and Diossa organized members of the community to raise enough funds to have it reopened. When the city's sole post office was in danger of closing, he led a march to protest the closure and met with the United States Postmaster General, saving the post office.

The city cut jobs and services to come out of bankruptcy in September 2012. Also in September 2012, Charles Moreau, Central Falls' mayor, resigned and pled guilty to federal charges of fraud. Diossa ran in a special election for mayor in December 2012, and won. He took office on January 1, 2013, at the age of 27. Diossa hired an administrative and a financial officer for the city in April 2013. Under Diossa's leadership, Moody's Investors Service upgraded their rating of Central Falls city bonds. Diossa also guided Central Falls through the COVID-19 pandemic in 2020.

After serving two terms as mayor, Diossa was prevented from running in the November 2020 election due to term limits. When Lieutenant Governor Dan McKee was elevated to governor in 2021, Diossa was a candidate to succeed McKee as lieutenant governor. However, McKee instead selected Providence city councilor Sabina Matos. In January 2021, Diossa became a senior advisor at the Rhode Island Innovative Policy Lab at Brown University. President Joe Biden nominated Diossa to the board of trustees for the James Madison Memorial Fellowship Foundation in July 2021.

=== Treasurer of Rhode Island ===
In December 2021, Diossa announced his candidacy for general treasurer of Rhode Island in the 2022 elections, as the incumbent, Seth Magaziner could not run for a third term due to term limits. Diossa defeated Stefan Pryor, the former state secretary of commerce, to win the Democratic Party nomination. He defeated James Lathrop, North Kingstown's finance director, in the general election on November 8.

Diossa won a second term as state treasurer in the 2026 elections.

== Personal life ==
Diossa's fiance, Sandra Cano, served in the Rhode Island State Senate. They have two children together.

Party political offices
Preceded by Seth Magaziner	Democratic nominee for General Treasurer of Rhode Island; 2022, 2026	Most recent
Political offices
Preceded by Seth Magaziner	Treasurer of Rhode Island; 2023–present	Incumbent
