= Senator Doyle =

Senator Doyle may refer to:

- Donald V. Doyle (1925–2007), Iowa State Senate
- James Doyle II (born 1972), Rhode Island State Senate
- John F. Doyle (1892–1962), Nebraska State Senate
- Paul Doyle (politician) (born 1963), Connecticut State Senate
- Tom Doyle (Nebraska politician) (1931–2022), Nebraska State Senate
- W. F. Doyle (1897–1988), Michigan State Senate
- William T. Doyle (1926–2024), Vermont State Senate
