= Senator Golden =

Senator Golden may refer to:

- Marty Golden (born 1950), New York State Senate
- Tim Golden (politician) (fl. 1990s–2010s), Georgia State Senate
- William B. Golden (born 1948), Massachusetts State Senate

== See also ==
- Gayle Goldin (fl. 2010s), Rhode Island State Senate
- Harrison J. Goldin (born 1936), New York State Senate
- William Henry Golding (1878–1961), Senate of Canada
