= Sam Bell (Rhode Island politician) =

American politician

Member of the Rhode Island Senate from the 5th district
- Incumbent
- Assumed office January 1, 2019
- Preceded by: Paul Jabour

Personal details
- Born: July 7, 1989 (age 37)
- Party: Democratic
- Other political affiliations: Democratic Socialists of America (Note: Democratic Socialists of America is not a registered political party, instead, it is a political organization for those with democratic socialist ideology.)
- Spouse: Samantha Weiser
- Children: 1
- Education: Amherst College (BA); Brown University (MS, PhD)
- Profession: Geologist

Samuel W. Bell (born July 7, 1989) is an American geologist and politician who serves in the Rhode Island State Senate representing the 5th district in Providence. A Democrat, he was first elected to the senate in the 2018 elections, and assumed office in 2019. Bell is a member of the Democratic Socialists of America.

== Background ==
Bell attended Amherst College where he earned a Bachelor's degree in Astronomy and Geology. Bell also attended Brown University where he earned a master's degree in Geosciences and a PhD in Earth, Environmental, and Planetary Science. When not in the senate, Bell works as a geologist.

== Political career ==
Bell decided to become involved in politics as a result of the Sandy Hook Elementary School shooting in Newtown, Connecticut in 2012. Bell defeated incumbent senator Paul Jabour in the Democratic primary in September 2018, and ran unopposed in the general election. He assumed office on January 1, 2019.

Bell ran for re-election in 2020, being challenged in the Democratic primary by majority leader of the Providence City Council Jo-Ann Ryan. Bell defeated Ryan by 50 percentage points, and ran unopposed in the general election.

In 2022, Bell proposed legislation that "would impose fines and double the taxes of those who refuse COVID-19 vaccine".

== Personal life ==
Bell is married to Samantha Weiser, a chairwoman of the Rhode Island Democratic Women's Caucus who also works for Hasbro. Bell and his wife are both Jewish and identify as bisexual. They live together in Mount Pleasant. In October 2018, Bell publicly alleged that he and his wife were personally targeted with antisemitic and homophobic posts from users of the neo-Nazi forum website Stormfront.

Bell and Weiser have one son, Jacob Weiser Bell, born in December 2021, who was diagnosed with infant respiratory distress syndrome after birth.

== See also ==
- List of Democratic Socialists of America who have held office in the United States
- List of LGBT Jews
