= Roberto DaSilva =

American politician

1st Mayor of East Providence, Rhode Island
- Incumbent
- Assumed office January 8, 2019
- Preceded by: Office established

Personal details
- Party: Democratic
- Spouse: Karina DaSilva
- Children: Two
- Education: Roger Williams University
- Profession: Police officer, politician, non-profit executive

Roberto DaSilva is an American politician currently serving as the first Mayor of the City of East Providence, Rhode Island. A member of the Democratic Party, he previously served as a State Representative for District 63 in the Rhode Island House of Representatives from 2009 to 2013.

DaSilva is the first Mayor in the history of the City of East Providence as a result of the passing of a 2017 referendum that changed the city's governance from a city manager and city council form of government to a "strong" mayor and city council form of government. Previously, the title of "Mayor" in the city of East Providence was bestowed upon one of the city councillors that was selected by the councillors themselves, and was a purely ceremonial role. In contrast, the current mayor is elected by the citizens of East Providence and is the chief executive of city government. According to The Providence Journal, this new system mirrors that of other Rhode Island cities such as Providence, Cranston and Warwick. He is of Azorean descent.

== Rhode Island Legislature ==
DaSilva was elected to the Rhode Island House of Representatives from District 63 in 2008, serving from 2009 to 2013. During his first term, he served on the House Labor and House Municipal Government committees. In his second term, DaSilva served on the House Judiciary Committee. During his time in the legislature, DaSilva championed tougher domestic violence laws, closing the indoor prostitution loophole and full-day kindergarten. DaSilva was often at odds with his own party's leadership during his tenure. DaSilva was one of only a few Democratic legislators that voted against pension reforms pushed by Rhode Island General Treasurer (and later Governor) Gina Raimondo and future political rival Senator Daniel Da Ponte. This move was wide criticized as being too close to the state labor unions.

=== Reform of the Rhode Island Department of Children, Youth, and Families ===
Representative DaSilva was a strong advocate of reform at the Rhode Island Department of Children, Youth & Families (the DCYF).

=== Senate race ===
DaSilva did not seek another term in the House of Representatives in the 2012 election cycle. Instead, he declared his candidacy for the District 14 State Senate seat held by incumbent Sen. Daniel Da Ponte, chairman of the Senate Finance Committee. By less than 80 votes, DaSilva narrowly lost to Da Ponte in the primary election.

== Time out of office ==
After the 2012 election, DaSilva went on a six year hiatus from politics. During that time, he volunteered in the community, advanced to the rank of captain in the police department of the city of Pawtucket, and founded the East Providence Youth Soccer Association and served as its inaugural President.

== Election 2018 ==
In August 2017, DaSilva announced his candidacy for Mayor of East Providence. His first campaign event occurred the following month. In April 2018, DaSilva was endorsed by the East Providence Democratic City Committee.

DaSilva's opponent in the general election was James Russo, a former assistant city solicitor and an ex-Chief of Staff to former Rhode Island congressman Robert Weygand.

In the November 2018 general election, DaSilva defeated Russo with 52.2% of the vote. The Providence Journal remarked that the race for the office of the Mayor was "cordial" and stated that the "two candidates [agreed] on many of the major issues facing the city, including [...] a need to step up development of the waterfront, as well as to lower taxes and repair roads."

== Mayor of East Providence ==
=== Transition and inauguration ===
During the transition from election to inauguration, DaSilva announced his nominees for the city's Municipal and Probate Courts. He also announced his selection for the offices of City Solicitor and Assistant City Solicitor. Each appointment required and was subsequently granted approval by the City Council. DaSilva's City Solicitor is Michael Marcello, both having known each other from their time serving in the House of Representatives.

DaSilva was sworn into office and inaugurated on January 8, 2019.

=== Work as Mayor ===
DaSilva's first city budget as Mayor was proposed in September 2019. The $165.8 million budget included a tax increase that would assist in financing the construction of the city's new high school. The tax increase would add, on average, $104 to each homeowner's property tax bill. DaSilva submitted the budget to the East Providence City Council for review.

The City Council ultimately voted against the Mayor's budget. In October 2019, the City Council's budget was passed by the City Council without the signature of Mayor DaSilva, and became the official city budget. He stated at the time that he did not support the budget because of its inclusion of drastic cuts to the human resources budget and no increase in the homestead exemption. DaSilva remarked that "While I have the utmost respect for the City Council and the budget process, I could not in good conscience approve this budget." DaSilva outlined his concerns with the City Council's decision to deny portions of his proposed budget, stating that it was unwise to make cuts in the human resources budget as this omitted funding for training, recruitment and retention, and office supplies. DaSilva also proposed a .5 percent increase in the homestead tax exemption, and this was also denied by the Council.

In November 2019, Mayor DaSilva created the Mayor's Council on Veterans' Affairs through an executive order, his first as mayor. DaSilva stated that "My administration saw there was great need to bring together residents who are dedicated to veterans' affairs and others in the community who represent organizations focus on the betterment of veterans' lives."

=== Public safety appointments ===
In March 2019, DaSilva named William Nebus as the city's police chief after the retirement of Christopher Parella. In November 2019, Mayor DaSilva appointed Glenn Quick as chief of the East Providence Fire Department.

=== Impostor on Facebook ===
In August 2019, Mayor DaSilva warned the public about a fake Facebook profile that impersonated his name and image. The fake profile asked DaSilva's real friends to click on a link for free money. After being alerted by a member of the public, the Mayor advised his constituents and the press that this profile was not his. Facebook later removed the account.

== Personal life ==
DaSilva is married to Karina DaSilva, an immigrant from the Dominican Republic. Together they have two sons, Donovan and Dorian. Upon his election to the mayorship of East Providence, he retired as a Captain of the Pawtucket Police Department. He is also the founder of the East Providence Youth Soccer Association and served as its inaugural president.

Preceded by New office	Mayor of East Providence, Rhode Island; 2019-	Succeeded by Incumbent
Preceded by Henry Rose	Representative, Rhode Island House of Representatives; District 63; 2009-2013	Succeeded by Katherine Kazarian
