= Sandra Cano =

American politician (born 1983)

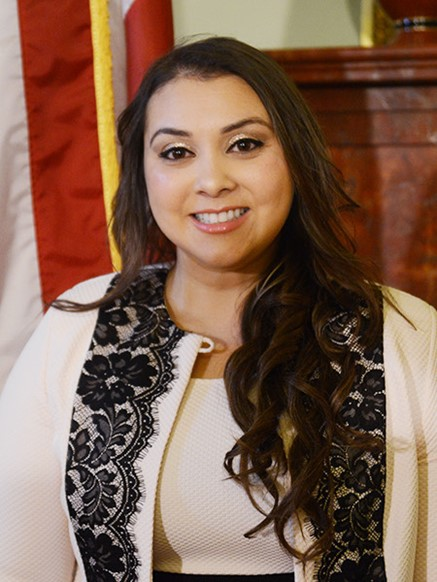

Member of the Rhode Island Senate from the 8th district
- In office April 12, 2018 – September 12, 2024
- Preceded by: James Doyle II
- Succeeded by: Lori Urso

Personal details
- Born: 1983 (age 42–43) Medellín, Colombia
- Party: Democratic
- Domestic partner: James Diossa
- Children: 2
- Education: Bryant University (BA); University of Rhode Island (MPA)

Sandra C. Cano (born 1983) is an American politician from the state of Rhode Island. She served in the Rhode Island Senate, representing District 8. Cano is a member of the Democratic Party.

== Early life ==
Cano was born in Medellín, Colombia. In 2000, at the age of 16, she moved with her family to the United States. She graduated from Bryant University, the University of Rhode Island's graduate program in public administration, and Harvard University's Executive Leadership Program.

== Career ==
Cano served as an at-large city councilwoman for Pawtucket, Rhode Island after serving on the city's school board. She won a special election on April 3, 2018, to succeed James Doyle II in the Rhode Island Senate. On January 12, 2021, Cano was appointed chairperson of the Senate Committee on Education for the 2021-2022 session.

On March 20, 2023, Cano declared her candidacy to represent Rhode Island's 1st congressional district in the United States House of Representatives in the 2023 special election.

Cano resigned from the Rhode Island Senate in September 2024 in order to pursue a career opportunity outside of the legislature. She was named the New England regional administrator for the Small Business Administration in November.

== Personal life ==
Cano's fiance, James Diossa, is the general treasurer of Rhode Island. They have two children together.
