= Paul Jabour =

American politician (born 1956)

Member of the Rhode Island Senate from the 5th district
- In office January 2, 2007 – January 1, 2019
- Preceded by: Frank T. Caprio
- Succeeded by: Sam Bell

Member of the Rhode Island House of Representatives from the 14 district
- In office April 2, 1985 – January 1, 1991
- Preceded by: Aldo Freda
- Succeeded by: Frank T. Caprio

Personal details
- Born: November 21, 1956 (age 69) Providence, Rhode Island
- Party: Democratic
- Education: University of Rhode Island; Boston University School of Law; University of New Hampshire School of Law
- Profession: Attorney

Paul V. Jabour (born November 21, 1956) is a former American politician. He was a Democratic member of the Rhode Island Senate. Jabour served non-consecutively in the Rhode Island General Assembly from his special election in April 1985 until December 31, 1990, in the Rhode Island House of Representatives. Jabour was defeated in a three-way primary on September 12, 2018.

== Early life ==
Jabour graduated from the University of Rhode Island. He earned his LLM from Boston University School of Law, and his JD from the University of New Hampshire School of Law.

== Career ==
- Jabour was challenged in the September 11, 2012 Democratic primary. He won with 1,656 votes (57.6%), and was unopposed for the November 6, 2012 General election, winning with 6,240 votes.
- Jabour won a special election to the Rhode Island House of Representatives in April 1985 and was re-elected in 1986 and 1988.
- When District 5 Democratic Senator Frank T. Caprio ran for state treasurer, Jabour won the three-way 2006 General election, beating Green candidate Jeffrey Toste and Republican nominee Robert Berrillo.
- Jabour was unopposed in the 2008 election, winning with 5,155 votes.
- Jabour was unopposed in the 2010 election, winning with 3,400 votes.
- Paul Jabour's cousin Michael Solomon announced his candidacy for Mayor of Providence, Rhode Island.
- Jabour was defeated in 2018 by Sam Bell in a three-way primary, 46% to 37%.
