= Bruce R. Lang =

Bruce R. Lang is an American entrepreneur and former television executive, television and radio host and analyst, co-founder of two Rhode Island good government groups, Operation Clean Government and UsPAC (1991–1993). He currently hosts State of the State (TV show) on a part-time basis.

== Career ==
Lang has a B.A. from the University of Rhode Island and an M.B.A. from the Harvard Business School. He also served two years in the United States Army as an officer. He spent eleven years in the Rhode Island recreation business as owner and operator of Lang's Bowlarama, a bowling center and cocktail lounge. It was here that Lang opened the first big screen television sports lounge in the United States. Lang served for five years as the executive director of the Rhode Island Partnership for Science & Technology.

Lang currently serves as chairman, vice-president and Treasurer of Lang Naturals, a company founded by his son, David, that produces a wide variety of "health-benefit driven" food, beverages, snacks and cutting edge nutritional supplements for major U.S. retailers. Lang Naturals also makes and markets MR. SPICE Sauces, the only U.S. line of salt-free sauces.

Lang was President of the Rhode Island Separation Of Powers Committee. He has also served on the Boards of many Rhode Island business, social services, art, government, and community organizations, including:

- Trinity Repertory Company
- American Lung Association-Rhode Island
- Meals on Wheels
- Rhode Island Council of the Arts (chairman)
- Rhode Island Community Food Bank
- Technology Council of Rhode Island
- Brown Venture Forum, now the Brown Forum for Enterprise

In 1990, Lang was a New England finalist for the entrepreneur of the Year Award in 1990. He was named the 1991 recipient of the Governor's Science & Technology Award.

Lang lives in Newport, Rhode Island, is married to Lois, and has two sons, David and Richard.

=== Media career ===
Lang spent seven years in New York City with CBS in television production, financial planning and news sales, programming and administration. Lang produced and hosted Melting Pot, a weekly public affairs TV program on WJAR-TV. Lang was a regular panelist on the Violet Round Table, a weekly public affairs TV program on WPRI-TV, hosted by Arlene Violet. Lang was also a talk show radio political analyst on two other Arlene Violet programs that aired on WHJJ radio from 1992 to 2007.

=== Operation Clean Government, OCG Candidate School, and State of the State ===
Lang was a co-founder of Operation Clean Government, a Rhode Island good government group, in 1993. He was the creator of OCG's biennial Candidate Schools, a nonpartisan educational forum that trains citizens in the art of running for elective office. OCG also produces State of the State, and Lang serves as a part-time moderator.
