= Grace Diaz =

American politician (born 1957)

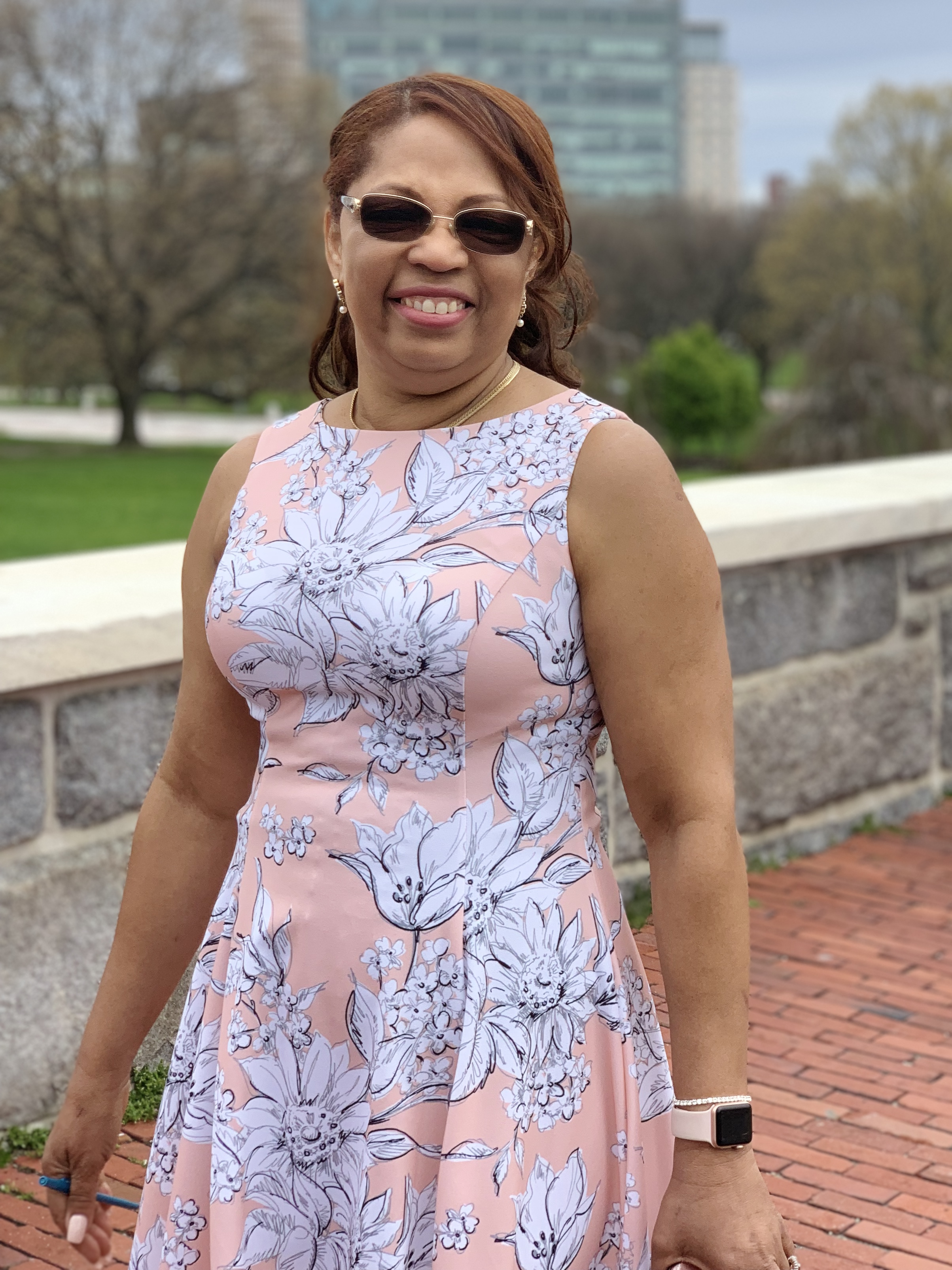

Chair of the Rhode Island Democratic Party Acting
- In office July 29, 2014 – October 9, 2014
- Preceded by: David Caprio
- Succeeded by: Joseph McNamara

Member of the Rhode Island House of Representatives from the 11th district
- Incumbent
- Assumed office January 4, 2005
- Preceded by: Leon Tejada

Personal details
- Born: February 21, 1957 (age 69) Dominican Republic
- Party: Democratic
- Education: Springfield College (BA, MA)
- Website: State House website

Grace Diaz (born February 21, 1957) is an American politician who is a Democratic State Representative from Rhode Island representing District 11 in the city of Providence, Rhode Island. She was the first Dominican-American woman elected to state office in the history of the United States of America. When she was appointed vice-chair of the Rhode Island Democratic Party she became the first Latina woman in Rhode Island to serve in such a high-ranking position. She has continuously advocated for legislation on issues such as women, children, and minorities; affordable housing, social justice, reform for the criminal justice system; and immigration issues.

Diaz is an alumna of Springfield College in Massachusetts. She is also the vice-chair of the Rhode Island Democratic Party.

== Early life and education ==
Grace Diaz grew up a second child of a single mother, Mercedes Peguero, in a very poor environment. She took on the role as adult at a very early age since from the early age of seven she woke up early to work in order to help her mother provide for her family. She attended Escuela España, a Public School in Santo Domingo, shortly after the Civil War in Dominican Republic occurred in 1965. She graduated from Los Ángeles Custodios in 1977.

Upon finishing high school, she attended a Public University in Santo Domingo.1 Diaz continued her education from Springfield College, achieving bachelor's and master's degree on 2008 and 2010.

== Political Career in the United States ==
Grace Diaz's US political career began in Rhode Island, fourteen year after she arrived from the Dominican Republic. Since elected in 2004, Representative Grace Diaz has represented the population of District 11 in Providence and has vowed to ensure access to education for everyone and same environment for children to grow up in. In January 2015, Diaz was named Democratic Caucus Chair making her a member of the House Leadership Team.6 In addition, she is also a chairwoman of the Legislative Commission on Child Care in Rhode Island and a member of both the House Committee on Finance and the House Committee on Rules.

In 2015, she also sponsored a legislation that creates a non-discriminatory clause in the Children's Bill of Rights, that goes towards the children that are under the care of DCYF (Department of Children, Youth and Their Families).6 The law also prevents any discriminatory action against these children based on color, religion, ancestry, race, gender or other identifying factor. Other than advocating for children's rights, Diaz is very interested in increasing access to adult education. She has also introduced a legislation that require the State Board of Education to consider certain factors, such as cost, in determining which high school equivalency test should be free by the state.2 In the last election in 2016, Diaz won 97 percentile of the votes.

Diaz has introduced many important legislation such as one she made in 2016, which aims to curtail racial disparities in school discipline. This new law she created is directed to all school superintendents and reviews disciplinary data in order to the school district to decide on whether there is an unequal impact on students enrolled base on ethnicity, race, or disability status and if they find any disparity they are responsible to respond.

== Leadership roles ==
In January 2015; Representative Diaz was named the Democratic Caucus Chair, making her a member of the House Leadership Team. She is currently the chairwoman of the Legislative Commission on Child Care in Rhode Island. For several years now, Diaz has hosted the World Diabetes Day Celebration at the Rhode Island State House, spreading awareness on the disease and its precautions and control. For the past five years she has also hosted the State House's Child Care Awareness Day. Diaz is a member of the National Association of Latino Elected Officials (NALEO), Women in Government, National Hispanic State Legislators]] and the Rhode Island Black and Latino Caucus. Representative Diaz is also a MBE/WBE Outreach Director of the city of Providence. Since 2015, she has been working with Providence, Rhode Island Mayor Jorge Elorza in expanding his vision for the capital city of Rhode Island.

== Personal life ==
Diaz currently has six grandchildren- Nehemiah, Kariana, Xavier, Anelle, Zoe and Amiah Gracemarie.

== Awards and recognitions ==
First Dominican Female Elected to State Office in the History of United States November 2004 to present.

The first Latino Dominican Female appointed to 1st Vice-Chair of the State Of Rhode Island March 2008 to present.

The first Latina-Dominican Appointed to be the Chair of The Democratic Caucus of the House of Represented January 2017 to present.

The first Latina-Dominican Appointed to be the Chair of the join Permanent Legislative Committee on Child Care of the state of Rhode Island December 2008- to present.

The first Latina-Dominican to be nominated as the Rhode Island Democratic super Delegate to the presidential convention 2008, 2012 and 2016 to present.

The first Latina-Dominican appointed to be one of 4 Rhode Island Electoral College to elect the President of United States 2016.

Party political offices
Preceded by David Caprio	Chair of the Rhode Island Democratic Party; Acting; 2014	Succeeded by Joseph McNamara
