= Joseph McNamara (Rhode Island politician) =

American politician (born 1950)

Joe McNamara

Chair of the Rhode Island Democratic Party
- In office October 9, 2014 – November 15, 2023
- Preceded by: Grace Diaz (acting)
- Succeeded by: Liz Perik

Member of the Rhode Island House of Representatives from the 19th district
- Incumbent
- Assumed office January 7, 2003
- Preceded by: Aisha Abdullah-Odiase

Member of the Rhode Island House of Representatives from the 29th district
- In office January 3, 1995 – January 7, 2003
- Preceded by: James Langevin
- Succeeded by: Stephen Anderson

Personal details
- Born: September 7, 1950 (age 75) Providence, Rhode Island, U.S.
- Party: Democratic
- Education: Boston University (BS); Providence College (MEd)

Joseph M. McNamara (born September 7, 1950, in Providence, Rhode Island) is an American politician and a Democratic member of the Rhode Island House of Representatives representing District 19 since January 2003. McNamara served consecutively from January 1995 until January 2003 in the District 29 seat.

== Education ==
McNamara earned his BS from Boston University and his MEd from Providence College.

== Elections ==
- 1994 When District 29 Democratic Representative James Langevin ran for Secretary of State of Rhode Island and left the seat open, McNamara won the three-way September 13, 1994 Democratic Primary and won the November 8, 1994 General election with 2,802 votes (66.1%) against Republican nominee Ernest Young.
- 1996 McNamara was unopposed for the September 10, 1996 Democratic Primary, winning with 766 votes and won the November 5, 1996 General election with 2,952 votes (79.7%) against Cool Moose Party candidate Nancy Thompson, one of his Democratic Primary opponents from 1994.
- 1998 McNamara and returning challenger Nancy Thompson both won their September 15, 1998 primaries, setting up a rematch; McNamara won the November 3, 1998 General election with 2,730 votes (77.7%) against Thompson.
- 2000 McNamara was unopposed for the September 12, 2000 Democratic Primary, winning with 1,095 votes and won the November 7, 2000 General election with 3,321 votes (70.2%) against Republican nominee Paul Cannistra.
- 2002 Redistricted to District 19, and with incumbent Representative Aisha Abdullah-Odiase leaving the Legislature, McNamara and returning 2000 Republican challenger Paul Cannistra were both unopposed for their September 10, 2002 primaries, setting up a rematch; McNamara won the three-way November 5, 2002 General election with 3,090 votes (56.1%) against Cannistra and former state Senator Edward Lawrence, running as an Independent.
- 2004 McNamara was unopposed for both the September 14, 2004 Democratic Primary, winning with 347 votes and the November 2, 2004 General election, winning with 4,912 votes.
- 2006 McNamara was unopposed for both the September 12, 2006 Democratic Primary, winning with 1,047 votes and the November 7, 2006 General election, winning with 5,098 votes.
- 2008 McNamara was unopposed for the September 9, 2008 Democratic Primary, winning with 530 votes and won the November 4, 2008 General election with 4,598 votes (68.7%) against Republican nominee Robert Paquin.
- 2010 McNamara was unopposed for the September 23, 2010 Democratic Primary, winning with 928 votes, and won the three-way November 2, 2010 General election with 3,309 votes (59.7%) against Republican nominee Maureen O'Gorman and Moderate candidate Anthony Dubois.
- 2012 McNamara was unopposed for both the September 11, 2012 Democratic Primary, winning with 1,258 votes and the November 6, 2012 General election, winning with 5,546 votes.
- In 2014, McNamara was elected chair of the Rhode Island Democratic Party, succeeding Grace Diaz

McNamara announced Rhode Island's votes in the roll call at the 2020 Democratic National Convention where he also promoted the state's seafood industry.

Party political offices
Preceded by Grace Diaz; Acting	Chair of the Rhode Island Democratic Party; 2014–2023	Succeeded by Liz Perik
