= Operation Clean Government =

U.S. nonprofit organization

Operation Clean Government is a nonpartisan, nonprofit citizens' lobby and advocacy organization. The organization was founded in 1993 by Bruce R. Lang and others through the union of three Rhode Island good government groups (Operation Clean Sweep, Rhode Island Taxpayers Association (RITA), and UsPAC) that had formed in response to the credit union crisis in 1991 (45 banks and credit unions in the state closed due to the collapse of the Rhode Island Share and Deposit Indemnity Corporation (RISDIC), a state level deposit scheme that was privately owned by state chartered).

Operation Clean Government's current President is Margaret Kane, a former OCG Board member. Kane replaces Marie Sorman, who stepped down in December 2010. OCG is funded by dues and contributions from approximately 2,000 members and supporters.

== Mission and issues ==
Operation Clean Government's mission: "Operation Clean Government (OCG) is a group dedicated to promoting honest, responsible, and responsive state government in Rhode Island."

Operation Clean Government focuses on several issues, including:

- Candidate and Voter Education
- Ethics in Government
- Government Accountability

OCG also weighs in on economic and judicial topics.

== Candidate and Voter Education ==
Operation Clean Government's most well-known candidate education effort is known as OCG Candidate School. Beginning in 2002, OCG has sponsored a biennial event intended to help new candidates achieve success through a day-long series of workshops and roundtables targeting campaign strategy, campaign finance reporting, and get-out-the-vote activities. Notable graduates include Rhode Island Governor Donald Carcieri and former Cranston mayor Steve Laffey. The next Candidate School is scheduled for Saturday, March 6, 2010.

Since 2001, OCG has been the sponsor of a weekly political talk show, State of the State. This show is intended to educate voters about political topics that the mainstream media cannot devote time or resources to. Other voter education activities include sponsoring legislation to add pro and con arguments for ballot questions to the existing Voter Handbook, as is done currently in California and 14 other states.

OCG also sponsors forums intended to bring citizens and legislators together to discuss ways to improve state government, most recently a forum on corruption in 2009.

== Ethics in Government ==
Operation Clean Government representatives monitor Rhode Island Ethics Commission proceedings and testify when appropriate.

OCG has filed ethics complaints with the Rhode Island Ethics Commission that have resulted in fines (former State Senate President Joseph Montalbano), House Majority Leader Gordon D. Fox, and former State Senator John Celona, who was sent to jail.

Another OCG complaint (filed in 2004) against Senate President William Irons was in the probable cause stage at the Rhode Island Ethics Commission sanctions when Mr. Irons appealed the Rhode Island Superior Court. Irons was accused of not disclosing his clients and voting on legislation that was favorable to these clients (CVS/pharmacy, Blue Cross/Blue Shield of RI). The Superior Court, under Judge Darrigan, eventually ruled in Mr. Iron's favor. By 2009, the Ethics Commission made it to the Rhode Island Supreme Court, which upheld the lower court decision; this effectively stripped the Rhode Island Ethics Commission of its ability to pursue conflict-of-interest cases against legislators due to the "speech-in-debate" clause of the Rhode Island Constitution. OCG is pushing for a ballot question in 2010 to amend the Constitution to re-empower the Ethics Commission to pursue these kinds of conflicts.

== Government Accountability ==
OCG uses a team of volunteer lobbyists to persuade Rhode Island legislators to support good government ideas such as Voter Initiative, greater transparency (the publishing of committee votes, for example), creation of an Inspector General's office to root out waste and fraud, elimination of straight ticket voting, and legislation for public financing of elections.

== Operation Clean Government Newsletter ==
Since 1993, Operation Clean Government has published a newsletter. The first two years, the banner was Operation Clean Government. In 1995, the newsletter was renamed RI Focus and it later changed to the Citizen Alert.

== Golden Broom Awards ==
Since 1993, OCG has awarded its Golden Broom Awards to Rhode Island citizens for outstanding contributions to keeping state government more honest, responsible, and responsive.

Award winners since 1993:

Treasurer Nancy Mayer, November 1993
State Senator J. Michael Lenihan, March 1994
Bruce R. Lang, November 1994
Thomas McHugh and Barbara McHugh August 1995
Richard Morsilli, October 1997
Secretary of State James R. Langevin, February 1998
Senator Marc A. Cote, February 1999
Arlene Violet, September 2000
Representative Nicholas Gorham, January 2003
Robert G. Flanders, Jr., October 2004
Jim Hummel, November 2008
James Lynch, Jr., November 2008
