= Michael Marcello =

American politician

Member of the Rhode Island House of Representatives from the 41st district
- In office January 2009 – January 2017
- Preceded by: Carol Mumford
- Succeeded by: Robert Quattrocchi

Personal details
- Born: Michael Joseph Marcello; May 30, 1968 (age 58) Providence, Rhode Island
- Party: Democratic
- Education: Colby College; Washington College of Law
- Profession: Attorney

Michael Joseph Marcello (born May 30, 1968 in Providence, Rhode Island) is a former American politician who served as a Democratic member of the Rhode Island House of Representatives, representing District 41 from January 2009 until January 2017. He is currently the City Solicitor for the City of East Providence, Rhode Island serving under Mayor Roberto DaSilva.

== Legislative career ==
Marcello and Mayor Bob DaSilva served as state representatives during the same years and together worked to reform DCYF.

== Education ==
Marcello earned his BA in government from Colby College and earned his JD from Washington College of Law.

== Elections ==
- 2006 To challenge House District 41 incumbent Republican Representative Carol Mumford, Marcello was unopposed for the September 12, 2006 Democratic Primary, but lost the November 7, 2006 General election to Representative Mumford.
- 2008 When Representative Mumford retired and left the seat open, Marcello was unopposed for the September 9, 2008 Democratic Primary, winning with 217 votes and won the November 4, 2008 General election with 4,285 votes (54.2%) against Republican nominee Christopher Caluori.
- 2010 Marcello was unopposed for the September 23, 2010 Democratic Primary, winning with 614 votes and won the November 2, 2010 General election with 3,450 votes (52.9%) against Republican nominee Marco Lucci.
- 2012 Marcello was unopposed for the September 11, 2012 Democratic Primary, winning with 331 votes and won the three-way November 6, 2012 General election with 4,171 votes (55.4%) against returning 2010 Republican challenger Marco Lucci and Independent candidate Lee Grossguth.
- 2014 Marcello was unopposed in the Democratic primary on September 9, 2014. He then won the General election on November 4, 2014 with 2,736 votes against Republican Lillian Delmonico and Independent candidate Robert Quattrocchi.
- 2016 Marcello was unopposed in the Rhode Island House of Representatives District 41 Democratic primary on September 13, 2016. He then lost the General election on November 8, 2016 to Republican candidate Robert Quattrocchi (who previously faced Marcello as an independent) with 3,871 votes to Quattrocchi's 4,058.
