= Liz Beretta-Perik =

American politician and current Chair of the Rhode Island Democratic Party

Liz Perik

Chair of the Rhode Island Democratic Party
- In office November 15, 2023 – October 20, 2026
- Preceded by: Joe McNamara

Personal details
- Born: 1963 (age 62–63)
- Party: Democratic
- Education: College of the Holy Cross (BA); Boston College (MS)

Elizabeth "Liz" Beretta-Perik (born 1963) is an American politician and the former chairwoman of the Rhode Island Democratic Party. Perik is the first woman to serve in that position. Perik resigned in October 2026.

== Early life and career ==
Perik first got involved in politics at the age of 10, helping her uncle's friend campaign for mayor of Pawtucket. Although she was a Jamestown resident, she attended and graduated North Kingstown High School as Jamestown did not have its own high school. Perik went on to attend the College of the Holy Cross, where she received a bachelor's degree in economics, and went on to receive her master's degree in finance from Boston College.

Following her graduation from Boston College, Perik worked for the Democratic Congressional Campaign Committee and Al Gore's 2000 presidential campaign.

Perik served as the Rhode Island Democratic Party's delegate to the Democratic National Committee and from 2019 was the treasurer of the Rhode Island Democratic Party. Perik was a presidential elector from Rhode Island in the 2020 presidential election.

Following Gina Raimondo's resignation as governor of Rhode Island to serve as United States Secretary of Commerce, Perik was one of five candidates considered by Governor Dan McKee to replace the vacant Lieutenant Governor's office. The position ultimately went to Providence City Council president Sabina Matos.

== Chair of the Rhode Island Democratic Party ==
In November, 2023, Joseph McNamara, the party's longtime chairman, announced that he would not be running for re-election as he had other responsibilities. Perik was elected as the chairwoman of the party on November 15, 2023, becoming the first woman to serve as the head of the Rhode Island Democratic Party. In October 2026, Perik resigned as chair amid her husband being indicted for allegedly stealing $20 million from the now defunct Eastern Gateway Community College.

Party political offices
Preceded by Joe McNamara	Chair of the Rhode Island Democratic Party; 2023–present	Incumbent
