= Carol Mumford =

American politician

Member of the Rhode Island House of Representatives from the 41st district
- In office January 5, 1999 – January 6, 2009
- Succeeded by: Michael Marcello

Personal details
- Born: December 2, 1943 Providence, Rhode Island
- Died: July 19, 2014 (aged 70) Scituate, Rhode Island
- Party: Republican

Carol Mumford (December 2, 1943 – July 19, 2014) was an American politician who served in the Rhode Island House of Representatives from the 41st district from 1999 to 2009.

She died on July 19, 2014, in Scituate, Rhode Island at age 70.
