= James Doyle II =

American politician

Member of the Rhode Island Senate from the 8th district
- In office January 2005 – January 2018
- Preceded by: William Irons
- Succeeded by: Sandra Cano

Personal details
- Born: February 16, 1972 (age 54)
- Party: Democratic
- Education: Providence College

James E. Doyle II (born February 16, 1972) is an American politician and a Democratic member of the Rhode Island Senate representing District 8 until 2018. He resigned in January 2018 citing his battles with alcoholism.

He was also being investigated for check kiting to defraud three local banks of more than $74 million. He was charged and pled guilty to 31 counts of bank fraud and tax evasion.

== Education ==
One of three children born to James E. Doyle (1938-2016), a former mayor of Pawtucket, Rhode Island, and his wife, Joan C. (née Richer) Doyle, Doyle II earned his BA degree from Providence College.

== Elections ==
- 2004: When District 8 Democratic Senator William Irons retired and left the seat open, Doyle was unopposed for the September 14, 2004 Democratic Primary, winning with 1,296 votes, and won the November 2, 2004 General election with 5,830 votes (70.1%) against Independent Martin Healy.
- 2006: Doyle was unopposed for both the September 12, 2006 Democratic Primary, winning with 1,933 votes, and the November 7, 2006 General election, winning with 6,634 votes.
- 2008: Doyle was unopposed for both the September 9, 2008 Democratic Primary, winning with 1,333 votes, and the November 4, 2008 General election, winning with 7,182 votes.
- 2010: Doyle was unopposed for the September 23, 2010 Democratic Primary, winning with 2,419 votes, and was unopposed for the November 2, 2010 General election, winning with 3,933 votes (63.0%) against Republican Elizabeth Croll.
- 2012: Doyle was unopposed for the September 11, 2012 Democratic Primary, winning with 1,680 votes; returning 2010 challenger Elizabeth Croll ran as an Independent, setting up a rematch. Doyle won the November 6, 2012 General election, winning with 6,435 votes (75.3%) against Croll.
- 2014: Doyle was unopposed in the Democratic primary and was unchallenged in the general election.
- 2016: Doyle defeated Matthew Fecteau and Mark Theroux in the Rhode Island State Senate District 8 Democratic primary. Doyle ran unopposed in the Rhode Island State Senate District 8 general election.
