= Gayle Goldin =

American politician

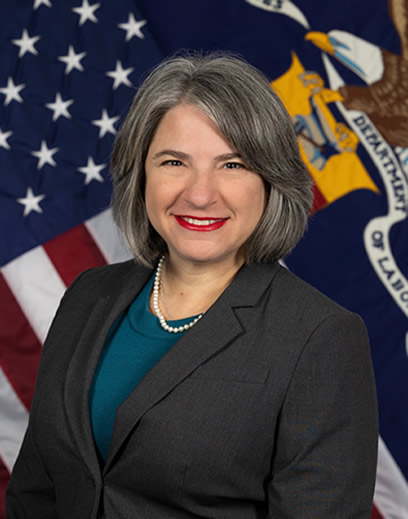

Member of the Rhode Island Senate from the 3rd district
- In office January 1, 2013 – August 17, 2021
- Preceded by: Rhoda Perry
- Succeeded by: Sam Zurier

Personal details
- Party: Democratic
- Spouse: Jeff Levy
- Education: McGill University; Tufts University
- Website: gaylegoldin.com

Gayle L. Goldin is an American politician and a former Democratic member of the Rhode Island Senate representing District 3 from January 2013 to August 2021. She is originally from Montreal, Canada, having immigrated to the United States at a young age.

Goldin resigned from the senate in August 2021 to become the Deputy Director of the Women's Bureau of the United States Department of Labor under the Biden administration.

== Education ==
Goldin earned her BA in English literature from McGill University and her MA in public policy from Tufts University.

== Rhode Island Senate ==
Goldin was a member of the Senate Democratic Caucus, of which she was the Deputy Majority Whip.

Shortly after her election to the Senate, Goldin was the primary sponsor of the Temporary Disability Insurance bill, which made Rhode Island the third state to offer temporary benefits to workers "take time off for a seriously ill child, spouse, parent, domestic partner or to bond with a new child."

Goldin successfully sponsored a bill in 2016 which requires Rhode Island schools to educate students about the Holocaust and other genocides.

She is also an outspoken advocate for other women in politics and publicly detailed the sexism faced by women at the Rhode Island Statehouse.

=== Committee assignments ===
Goldin was a member of the following committees:

- Committee on Health & Human Services, Vice Chair
- Committee on Labor
- Committee on Environment and Agriculture, Secretary

== Electoral history ==
Rhode Island Senate, District 3 Democratic Primary, 2012
Party	Candidate	Votes	%
Democratic	Gayle Goldin	2,225	57.3
Democratic	Maryellen Butke	1,657	42.7
Total votes		3,882	100.00

Rhode Island Senate, District 3 General Election, 2012
Party	Candidate	Votes	%
Democratic	Gayle Goldin	8,437	96.7
n/a	Write-in	291	3.3
Total votes		8,728	100.00

Rhode Island Senate, District 3 Democratic Primary, 2014
Party	Candidate	Votes	%
Democratic	Gayle Goldin	3,775	68.8
Democratic	Christopher Wall	1,657	31.2
Total votes		5,483	100.00

Rhode Island Senate, District 3 General Election, 2014
Party	Candidate	Votes	%
Democratic	Gayle Goldin	7,233	96.2
n/a	Write-in	282	3.8
Total votes		7,515	100.00

Rhode Island Senate, District 3 Democratic Primary, 2016
Party	Candidate	Votes	%
Democratic	Gayle Goldin	1,622	100.00
Total votes		1,622	100.00

Rhode Island Senate, District 3 General Election, 2016
Party	Candidate	Votes	%
Democratic	Gayle Goldin	9,820	96.4
n/a	Write-in	372	3.6
Total votes		10,192	100.00

Rhode Island Senate, District 3 Democratic Primary, 2018
Party	Candidate	Votes	%
Democratic	Gayle Goldin	5,141	100.00
Total votes		5,141	100.00

Rhode Island Senate, District 3 General Election, 2018
Party	Candidate	Votes	%
Democratic	Gayle Goldin	9,426	97.6
n/a	Write-in	235	3.6
Total votes		9,661	100.00

No other candidates filed for election in the 2020 District 3 Democratic Primary and it was subsequently cancelled.
