= Basil B. Bruno =

American politician

Member of the New Jersey General Assembly from Monmouth County
- In office 1936–1937 Serving with Haydn Proctor

Member of the New Jersey General Assembly from Monmouth County
- In office 1925–1927 Serving with Peter F. Dodd

Personal details
- Born: October 17, 1887 Long Branch, New Jersey
- Died: 1955 (aged 67–68)
- Party: Republican
- Spouse: Amelia Heilig
- Education: New Jersey College of Pharmacy
- Occupation: Pharmacist

Basil B. Bruno (1887–1955) was an American Republican Party politician, who served in the New Jersey General Assembly representing Monmouth County in 1924 and 1925, and again in 1936.

== Biography ==
The son of Italian immigrants, Bruno was born in Long Branch, New Jersey on October 17, 1887. He was educated in the Long Branch Public Schools and was a 1910 graduate of the New Jersey College of Pharmacy, now part of Rutgers University. For eighteen years he was a pharmacist in Long Branch, ultimately operating two pharmacies. In 1930 he changed careers and went into the real estate and insurance business. He was a volunteer firefighter with Atlantic Engine & Truck Co. No. 2, of the Long Branch Fire Department. Basil Bruno served as a member of the Long Branch Board of Health.

He was active in fraternal orders, including the Benevolent and Protective Order of Elks, Junior Order of United American Mechanics and the Triluminar Lodge, Free & Accepted Masons.

Basil B. Bruno died in 1955 and is buried in Glenwood Cemetery, West Long Branch.

== Legislative career ==
Bruno was elected to the State Assembly in the 1924 general Election, and reelected in 1925. He was elected to a third, one-year term in 1935.
