= Paul Tavares =

American politician

Paul J. Tavares is an American former politician for the state of Rhode Island. He served in the East Providence City Council and the Rhode Island State Senate. He was elected Treasurer of Rhode Island in 1998. Paul's campaign motto was No tricks, no gimmicks, just a Treasurer who will do what is right. He served until 2006. Sheldon Whitehouse praised the CollegeBound fund, Rhode Island's 529 college savings program, which Tavares was instrumental in securing. He also served as the interim housing director for the Providence Housing Authority.

Outside of politics, he was a banker. In 2011, he became a manager at Washington Trust Bank in East Providence.

Party political offices
| Preceded by Richard H. James | Democratic nominee for General Treasurer of Rhode Island; 1998, 2002 | Succeeded by Frank T. Caprio |
Rhode Island Senate
| Preceded by District created | Member of the Rhode Island Senate from the 42nd district 1993–1999 | Succeeded by Daniel Da Ponte |
Political offices
| Preceded by Nancy Mayer | Treasurer of Rhode Island; 1999–2007 | Succeeded by Frank T. Caprio |
