= Nancy Mayer =

American politician (born 1937)

Treasurer of Rhode Island
- In office January 1993 – January 1999
- Governor: Bruce Sundlun; Lincoln Almond
- Preceded by: Anthony Solomon
- Succeeded by: Paul J. Tavares

Personal details
- Born: June 9, 1937 (age 88) Philadelphia, Pennsylvania, U.S.
- Party: Republican
- Education: Columbia University (BA); Brown University (MA); Northeastern University (JD)

Nancy Mayer is an American politician who most recently served as the state Treasurer of Rhode Island from 1993 to 1998.

She was the first Republican Treasurer of Rhode Island since Thomas P. Hazard in 1940 and the last Republican Treasurer of Rhode Island as of 2022. She has been credited with introducing and implementing a number of reforms, both in the Office of the General Treasurer and in the General Assembly. In 1996, she ran for U.S. Senate after incumbent Claiborne Pell decided to retire. She won the Republican primary. She lost the general election to Jack Reed.

Political offices
Preceded by Anthony Solomon	Treasurer of Rhode Island; 1993–1999	Succeeded by Paul J. Tavares
Party political offices
Preceded by Kenneth M. Bianchi	Republican nominee for General Treasurer of Rhode Island; 1992, 1994	Succeeded by James S. Bennett
Preceded by Claudine Schneider	Republican nominee for U.S. Senator from Rhode Island (Class 2); 1996	Succeeded by Robert Tingle
Preceded by Jeffrey B. Pine	Republican nominee for Attorney General of Rhode Island; 1998	Vacant Title next held by J. William W. "Bill" Harsch
