= Christopher Ottiano =

American politician

Member of the Rhode Island Senate from the 11th district
- In office January 2011 – October 13, 2015
- Preceded by: Charles Levesque
- Succeeded by: John Pagliarini

Personal details
- Born: February 19, 1969 (age 57)
- Party: Republican
- Education: Wesleyan University; Tufts University School of Medicine
- Profession: Physician
- Website: electdrchris.com

Christopher Scott Ottiano (born February 19, 1969) is an American politician and a Republican member of the Rhode Island Senate representing District 11 since January 2011.

== Education ==
Ottiano earned his BA in chemistry from Wesleyan University and his MD from Tufts University School of Medicine.

== Elections ==
- 2012 Ottiano was unopposed for both the September 11, 2012 Republican Primary and the November 6, 2012 General election, winning with 8,747 votes.
- 2006 To challenge District 11 incumbent Democratic Senator Charles Levesque, Ottiano was unopposed for the September 12, 2006 Republican Primary, winning with 1,471 votes, but lost the November 7, 2006 General election to Senator Levesque.
- 2008 Ottiano and Senator Levesque were both unopposed for their September 9, 2008 primaries, setting up a rematch; Ottiano lost the three-way November 4, 2008 General election to Senator Levesque.
- 2010 Ottiano and Senator Levesque were again both unopposed for their September 23, 2010 primaries, setting up their third contest; Ottiano won November 2, 2010 General election with 5,376 votes (55.4%) against Senator Levesque.
