= Rhode Island Innovative Policy Lab =

The Rhode Island Innovative Policy Lab (RIIPL) is an interdisciplinary collaboration between the Office of the Governor of Rhode Island and researchers at Brown University. The lab's mission is to help state agencies design evidence-based policies that improve the quality of life for Rhode Islanders.

RIIPL examines current Rhode Island policies and works with government partners to design and rigorously evaluate new programs that deliver better social outcomes at a lower cost. The lab is directed by Dr. Justine Hastings, Professor of Economics and International and Public Affairs at Brown University and Faculty Research Associate at the National Bureau of Economic Research.

== History and Mission ==
The Rhode Island Innovative Policy Lab was founded at Brown University in 2015, with a near $3 million grant from the Laura and John Arnold Foundation. Rhode Island Governor Gina Raimondo praised the lab's formation: “This effort,” the Governor wrote in a statement, “will help inform our future policy decisions as we look for ways to move our state forward.”

RIIPL uses comprehensive data from government and industry to analyze the impacts of social policy across the individual, familial, and societal levels. In particular, the lab brings together economists, data scientists, and smart policy analysts to identify policy challenges and generate research-driven policy solutions. RIIPL also convenes working groups, policy discussions, and conferences to engage policymakers and program managers in evaluating key government programs.

The lab exemplifies a push by the Obama administration to use behavioral science insights to craft more effective policy. Since its creation, RIIPL has inspired an initiative by the Laura and John Arnold Foundation to fund a series of other policy labs using the RIIPL model across the country. In March 2016, a bipartisan coalition led by Speaker Paul Ryan and Senator Patty Murray established the federal Commission on Evidence-based Policymaking to increase the availability and use of federal data in designing smart policy programs.

== Focus Areas ==
RIIPL is focused around five key initiatives, all aimed at tackling some of the largest problems facing governments and societies:

- Closing the Achievement Gap through increasing equity of opportunity, so that all children have the ability to reach their full potential;
- Developing Smart Policy Programs with higher impact per dollar, so that we can more effectively fight poverty;
- Restoring Community through equitable criminal justice programs, recognizing that society gains when all people are productively engaged;
- Designing Regulation that Works for business and the environment, by designing transparent environmental regulations that are green and grow the economy; and
- Learning from the Past by using prior policy changes to inform future decisions, because we learn from our failures and successes alike.

== Select publications ==
Policy Brief — “How Are SNAP Benefits Spent? Evidence from a Retail Panel”

Research Paper — “How Are SNAP Benefits Spent? Evidence from a Retail Panel”
