= Teresa Tanzi =

American politician (born 1971)

Member of the Rhode Island House of Representatives from the 34th district
- Incumbent
- Assumed office January 4, 2011
- Preceded by: David Caprio

Personal details
- Born: November 3, 1971 (age 54)
- Party: Democratic
- Spouse: Eric Buchbaum
- Education: Brown University; University of Rhode Island; Middlesex County College
- Website: www.teresatanzi.com

Teresa Ann Tanzi (born November 3, 1971) is an American politician and a Democratic member of the Rhode Island House of Representatives representing District 34 since January 2011. Outside of working in government, Tanzi also works as a realtor.

== Political career ==
Tanzi was first elected to the Rhode Island House of Representatives in 2010, after defeating incumbent Representative David Caprio in the Democratic Primaries.

Tanzi has served on the House Corporations Committee, the House Finance Committee, the House Small Business Committee, the House Special Legislation Committee, and served as the Co-Vice Chair of the House State Oversight Committee. Tanzi currently sits on the House Government and Elections Committee and the House Innovation, Internet and Technology Committee.

== Personal life ==
Tanzi attended Brown University, the University of Rhode Island, and Middlesex County College but never finished any Bachelor degree at any University. Tanzi is married to Eric Buchbaum. They have one child, Delia. Tanzi currently resides in Wakefield, South Kingstown.

Tanzi is a member of the Narragansett Chamber of Commerce, the South Kingstown Chamber of Commerce, the Ocean State Action Executive Committee, and the South County Chapter Chair of the Rhode Island National Organization for Women.

== Elections ==
- 2010 Tanzi challenged District 34 incumbent Democratic Representative David Caprio in the September 23, 2010 Democratic Primary, winning with 1,333 votes (57.8%) and won the three-way November 2, 2010 General election with 3,260 votes (65.1%) against Republican nominee Timothy Burchett and Independent candidate Peter Stone.
- 2012 Tanzi was unopposed for the September 11, 2012 Democratic Primary, winning with 537 votes and won the November 6, 2012 General election with 3,678 votes (57.3%) against Republican nominee Christopher Wilkins.
- 2014 Tanzi was unopposed for the September 9, 2014 Democratic Primary, winning with 1195 votes and won in the November 4, 2014 General election with 1462 votes (62.7%) against Republican nominee Stephen C. Tetzner.
- 2016 Tanzi defeated Ewa M. Dzwierzynski and Rachel Clough in the September 13, 2016 Democratic Primary, winning with 980 votes (51.3%) and won the November 8, 2016 General election unopposed with 4612 votes (93.6%).
- 2018 Tanzi was unopposed for the September 12, 2018 Democratic Primary, winning with 1522 votes and won the November 6, 2018 General election with 3347 votes (54.7%) against Independent candidate Ewa M. Dzwierzynski.
- 2020 Tanzi defeated Gina M. Giramma in the September 8, 2020 Democratic Primary, winning with 1574 votes (71.0%) and won the November 3, 2020 General election unopposed with 5532 votes (94.2%).
