= Daniel Issa =

American politician

Daniel J. Issa (born 1952) is an American politician who served in the Rhode Island Senate from 1987 to 2009. Issa was the first Arab American state senator in Rhode Island's history.

Issa is a lifetime resident of Rhode Island. He was born in Central Falls and is a 1970 graduate of Central Falls High School. In 1974, he earned his bachelor's degree in political science from Rhode Island College and attended Manhattan School of Management at Bryant College.

Issa served as chairman of the Senate Committee on Education and was a member of the Senate Committee on Government Oversight. In addition, he serves as a member of the Rhode Island Board of Governors for Higher Education. He previously served as a member of the Rhode Island Underground Storage Tank Commission, on the Board of Trustees for Channel 36, and as a Vice President of the Rhode Island State Lottery Commission.

As a local elected official, Issa served as chairman of the Central Falls School Committee from 1974 to 1977. He also served as a member of the Central Falls City Council and the Knights of Columbus. He is currently a Certified Municipal Clerk (CMC), and he is a member of the 16th Senatorial Democratic District Committee, the 5th Ward Democratic Committee, the St. Vincent DePaul of Damascus Society, the Central Falls Democratic City Committee, and Chairman of Dexter Credit Union Committee.

Issa is Director of Marketing and Corporate Relations and resides in Central Falls.

During his tenure, he has worked on issues including missing children, enterprise zones/job creation, consumer protection, and judicial selection reform.
