= Jan Malik =

American politician

Member of the Rhode Island House of Representatives from the 67th district
- In office January 2003 – January 2017
- Preceded by: Donald Reilly
- Succeeded by: Jason Knight

Member of the Rhode Island House of Representatives from the 89th district
- In office January 1997 – January 2003
- Preceded by: James Lombardo
- Succeeded by: District abolished

Personal details
- Born: April 13, 1956 (age 70) Fall River, Massachusetts, U.S.
- Party: Democratic
- Education: Dean College

Jan P. Malik (born April 13, 1956 in Fall River, Massachusetts) is an American former politician and a Democratic member of the Rhode Island House of Representatives representing District 67 from January 2003 until January 2017. Malik served consecutively from January 1997 until January 2003 in the District 89 seat. He now runs Malik's Liquor Store in Warren, Rhode Island.

== Education ==
Malik earned his AA from Dean College.

== Elections ==
- 1996 Malik challenged District 89 incumbent Representative James Lombardo in the three-way September 10, 1996 Democratic Primary and won the November 5, 1996 General election against Republican nominee Pauline Acciardo.
- 1998 Malik was unopposed for both the September 15, 1998 Democratic Primary, winning with 755 votes and the November 3, 1998 General election, winning with 2,272 votes.
- 2000 Malik was unopposed for both the September 12, 2000 Democratic Primary, winning with 398 votes and the November 7, 2000 General election, winning with 3,082 votes.
- 2002 Redistricted to District 67, and with incumbent Representative Donald Reilly redistricted to District 52, Malik was unopposed for both the September 10, 2002 Democratic Primary, winning with 822 votes, and the November 5, 2002 General election, winning with 3,534 votes.
- 2004 Malik was unopposed for the September 14, 2004 Democratic Primary, winning with 432 votes and the November 2, 2004 General election, winning with 3,567 votes (64.3%) against Republican nominee Frank Nencka and Green candidate Brian Reynolds.
- 2006 Malik was unopposed for both the September 12, 2006 Democratic Primary, winning with 629 votes and the November 7, 2006 General election, winning with 4,147 votes.
- 2008 Malik was unopposed for both the September 9, 2008 Democratic Primary, winning with 199 votes and the November 4, 2008 General election, winning with 4,658 votes.
- 2010 Malik was unopposed for the September 23, 2010 Democratic Primary, winning with 770 votes, and won the November 2, 2010 General election with 2,465 votes (52.9%) against Independent candidate Joseph DePasquale.
- 2012 Malik was unopposed for the September 11, 2012 Democratic Primary, winning with 590 votes and won the November 6, 2012 General election with 3,634 votes (55.1%) against Republican nominee Peter Costa.
- 2014 Malik was unopposed in the Democratic primary on September 9, 2014 and was unchallenged in the General election on November 4, 2014.
- 2016 Malik lost the Democratic Primary election against Jason Knight on September 13, 2016 due to key victories by Knight in Barrington. Malik received 673 votes to Knight's 867. Knight went on to defeat Republican Daryl Gould in the General election.
