= David Caprio =

American politician (born 1967)

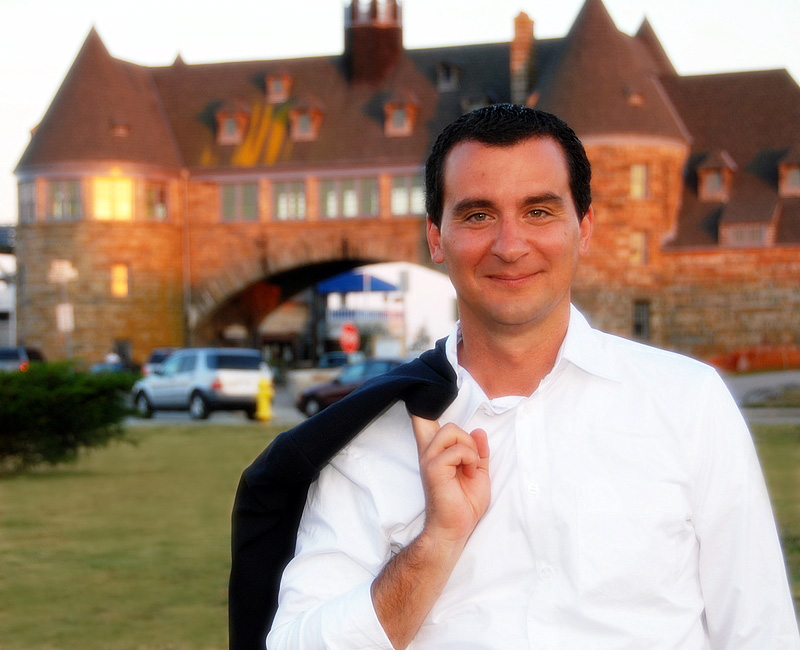

Member of the Rhode Island House of Representatives from the 34th district
- In office January 7, 2003 – January 4, 2011
- Preceded by: Robert E. Flaherty
- Succeeded by: Teresa Tanzi

Member of the Rhode Island House of Representatives from the 47th district
- In office December 21, 1999 – January 7, 2003
- Preceded by: James M. Kelso
- Succeeded by: Richard A. Aubin

Personal details
- Born: David Albert Caprio; June 5, 1967 (age 59) Rhode Island, U.S.
- Party: Democratic
- Parent(s): Frank Caprio (father); Joyce Caprio (mother)
- Relatives: Frank T. Caprio (brother)
- Education: Boston College (BS); Suffolk University (JD); International University of Monaco (MBA)
- Occupation: Businessman, investor, politician
- Profession: Attorney

David Albert Caprio (born June 5, 1967) is an American businessman, investor, lawyer, and politician who served as a member of the Rhode Island House of Representatives from District 34. He was first elected on December 21, 1999. In 2010, Caprio was defeated in a September primary election.

== Early life and education ==
Caprio is the son of Joyce and Frank Caprio, the former Chief of the Providence Municipal Court Judge, and he is the brother of former Rhode Island State Treasurer Frank T. Caprio. His paternal grandfather immigrated from Teano, Italy. Caprio attended Bishop Hendricken High School, graduating in 1985. He then went on to Boston College, graduating with a Bachelor of Science in 1989. He earned a Juris Doctor from the Suffolk University Law School and holds a Master of Business Administration degree from the International University of Monaco.

== Career ==
Caprio works as an attorney for the Providence law firm Caprio and Caprio and is an active real estate investor with holdings in Florida, Narragansett, Newport, Providence, and Barrington, Rhode Island.

Caprio was a former member of the Rhode Island House of Representatives.

Caprio ran a "green campaign", purchasing carbon offsets for his mobile campaign headquarters, printing all campaign materials on recycled paper, and purchasing offsets for his personal residence. He was endorsed by the Sierra Club, the SEIU (Service Employees International Union), and the American Federation of Teachers (AFT). On September 9, 2008, Caprio defeated his primary opponent Ryan P. Drugan by a 42% margin (71%-29%). In January 2009, he returned to the State House for his fifth term after having no opponent in the general election.

Caprio was named to the House Finance Committee in the 2009 General Assembly Session.

Rhode Island House of Representatives
Preceded by James M. Kelso	Member of the Rhode Island House of Representatives from the 47th district 1999–2003	Richard A. Aubin
Preceded by Robert E. Flaherty	Member of the Rhode Island House of Representatives from the 34th district 2003–2011	Succeeded by Teresa Tanzi
