= Rhode Island Board of Governors for Higher Education =

State agency of Rhode Island, United States

The Rhode Island Board of Governors for Higher Education (commonly referred to as the Board of Governors) is one of two state agencies in Rhode Island used for academia, the other being the Rhode Island Department of Elementary and Secondary Education.

== Area of responsibility ==
The Board of Governors oversees the public institutions of Rhode Island, being the University of Rhode Island, Rhode Island College, and the Community College of Rhode Island.

The mission statement states that "The mission of the Rhode Island Board of Governors for Higher Education is to provide an excellent, efficient, accessible and affordable system of higher education designed to improve the overall educational attainment of Rhode Islanders and thereby enrich the intellectual, economic, social and cultural life of the state, its residents, and its communities".

== History ==
In 2011, the Board of Governors approved a measure for the Rhode Island public education community, which permitted in-state tuition breaks to illegal immigrants. Incumbent Governor Lincoln Chafee supported the measure, calling it a "policy change" that would "improve the intellectual and culture life of Rhode Island".
