= Frank T. Caprio =

American politician (born 1966)

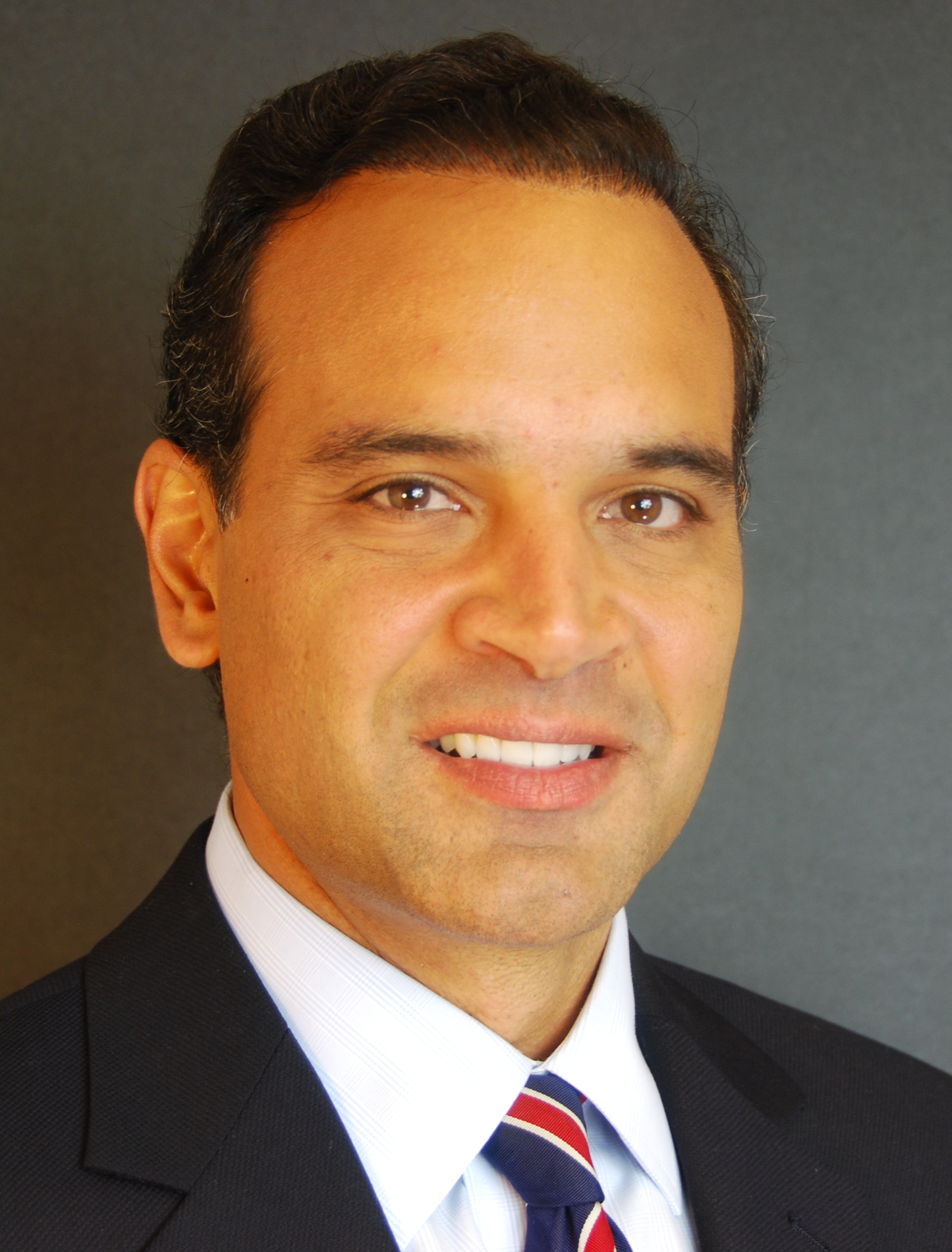
- Caprio in 2009

29th Treasurer of Rhode Island
- In office January 7, 2007 – January 4, 2011
- Governor: Don Carcieri
- Preceded by: Paul J. Tavares
- Succeeded by: Gina Raimondo

Member of the Rhode Island Senate
- In office January 7, 2003 – January 2, 2007
- Preceded by: Catherine Graziano
- Succeeded by: Paul Jabour
- Constituency: 5th district
- In office January 3, 1995 – January 7, 2003
- Preceded by: John Orabana
- Succeeded by: William V. Irons
- Constituency: 8th district

Member of the Rhode Island House of Representatives from the 14th district
- In office January 1, 1991 – January 3, 1995
- Preceded by: Paul Jabour
- Succeeded by: Steven M. Costantino

Personal details
- Born: Frank Thomas Caprio; May 10, 1966 (age 60) Providence, Rhode Island, U.S.
- Party: Democratic
- Spouse: Gabriella DiGiacinto
- Children: 2
- Parent: Frank Caprio (father)
- Relatives: David Caprio (brother)
- Education: Harvard University (BA); Suffolk University (JD)

Frank Thomas Caprio (born May 10, 1966) is an American banker, lawyer, and politician from Rhode Island. His twenty-year political career has included being elected as the 29th General Treasurer of Rhode Island from 2007 to 2011. He was the first political candidate in the United States to use on-demand television to reach voters and one of the first candidates to launch an internet TV channel for use in a political campaign in 2006.

Caprio was the Democratic nominee in the 2010 Rhode Island gubernatorial election, losing to Independent candidate Lincoln Chafee, who won with 36 percent of the vote. He ran for the Democratic nomination for General Treasurer in 2014 elections, but lost to first-time candidate Seth Magaziner. He also is a managing director at Chatham Capital, a mezzanine finance firm with offices in Atlanta, Dallas and Providence.

== Early life and education ==
Frank Thomas Caprio is the eldest child of Joyce and Judge Frank Caprio, and he is the brother of Rhode Island State Representative David Caprio. His paternal grandfather had immigrated from Teano, Italy. He attended public schools in Narragansett, Rhode Island, and graduated from Bishop Hendricken High School in 1984. He earned a degree in economics from Harvard College in 1988. While at Harvard, Caprio was captain of the Harvard baseball team. He was an All-Eastern League outfielder in 1988, and an All-Ivy League defensive back on the championship Harvard football team in 1987. He played against Roger Clemens in a 1987 exhibition game and was scouted by Boston Red Sox legend Ted Williams. Caprio earned a J.D. at Suffolk University Law School in 1991 and passed the bar exams in Rhode Island and Massachusetts.

== Career ==
As a lawyer, Caprio focused on corporate, tax, and finance issues. He worked as an in-house counsel at Cookson Group plc, a publicly traded company on the London Stock Exchange.

Caprio began his political career while a senior at Harvard, when he was 21 years old. He was elected a delegate from Rhode Island's Congressional District 2 and attended the 1988 Democratic National Convention in Atlanta. In 1990, while still attending law school, Caprio was elected to the Rhode Island House of Representatives for District 14 (Providence). He served two terms as a state representative, traveling by train between classes in Boston each morning and legislative sessions in Providence each afternoon.

Following those two terms, Caprio spent the next 12 years serving in the Rhode Island Senate, where he chaired the Senate Finance Committee in 2001–2002. In this position, Caprio saved an annual $5 million affordable housing program from being cut by the governor in 2001. He then proposed and implemented a plan to expand the $5 million to $10 million through an affordable housing bond. In 2006, he co-sponsored a bill to increase the annual $10 million bond to a $50 million affordable housing fund. The housing fund was approved by voters in 2006.

Caprio also led the debate on phasing out Rhode Island's capital gains tax, which would allow Rhode Islanders to have the nation's lowest tax rate on their stock and real estate profits. This tax change became law in 2007. He was removed from his chairmanship by Senate leadership in 2002 as a result of his outspoken advocacy of the Separation of Powers amendment. After some of the Senate leaders were removed from office in 2003, the amendment passed the legislature and became law after a statewide vote. In 2004, Caprio was named chair of the Senate Commerce, Housing, and Municipal Government Committee.

== Political career ==
=== General Treasurer of Rhode Island ===
==== 2006 election ====
On November 7, 2006, Caprio, the endorsed candidate of the Democratic Party, was elected General Treasurer of Rhode Island, receiving 73% of the vote. He won by a larger margin than any candidate for a contested statewide office on the Rhode Island ballot in 2006.

Caprio made Rhode Island history as the first candidate in the state to officially announce his candidacy via a multimedia broadcast that included television, Web, on-demand cable television, and radio. This was done, he explained, because he wants his "vision for the treasurer's office" to be accessible to "as many Rhode Islanders as possible in as comfortable a format as possible."

Caprio was the first political candidate in the United States to use On-Demand Television in a campaign. His television documentary, Caprio, the Biography, was available for free viewing throughout Rhode Island via Cox Communications's On-Demand program. He also launched one of the nation's first campaign internet TV channels. Both the website and his television ads garnered awards.

==== Investments and the 2008 market crisis ====
Months before the subprime mortgage crisis began to take a toll on banks, financial services companies and public pension funds, Caprio began to minimize the State's exposure to asset backed securities. Steps included conducting a competitive bidding process that expanded the number of qualified investment banks underwriting the State's bond transactions, and minimizing the State's exposure to companies such as Bear Stearns.

As part of his effort to ensure the health of Rhode Island's pension system, Caprio moved $1 billion from Quality D money market funds (with loose terms that could have allowed for investment in CDOs and SIVs) into Quality A institutional money market funds. This occurred before the subprime crisis began to shake financial markets. At the same time, Caprio moved approximately $150 million in high-yield investments into safe Treasury bonds, before the high yield market began to decline. Rhode Island's pension fund has maintained its five-year average on investment returns in spite of the current economic turmoil.

Caprio's approach to assessing and managing risk has helped ensure that the public funds managed by his office avoid the investment losses now plaguing other states. During Caprio's term the Rhode Island State Pension fund outperformed the States of Massachusetts and California State Pension funds as well as the Harvard endowment. In the midst of the 2008 market collapse, Caprio established a financial "SWAT team" of Rhode Island's top financial minds to ensure the State's protection from AIG's collapse. For the fiscal year 2010 a national study was done by the Maryland Public Policy Institute which found that Rhode Island's pension plan under Frank Caprio paid some of the lowest fees to outside money managers when compared to the other 49 states.

=== 2010 Rhode Island gubernatorial election ===
In 2010, Caprio was the Democratic nominee for governor of Rhode Island in the general election. He ran on the platform of advancing small business. After learning that President Barack Obama would not endorse him in the election, Caprio said that Obama could "take his endorsement and really shove it." The Huffington Post suggested that Obama did not endorse Caprio out of respect for Lincoln Chafee, the Independent nominee who had endorsed Obama in 2008.

=== 2014 General Treasurer election ===
In May 2013, Caprio announced his intention to regain the Rhode Island General Treasurer's post in the 2014 election. He lost in the Democratic primary to first-time candidate Seth Magaziner in a landslide, 80,378 votes (66.55%) to 40,402 (33.45%).

== See also ==
- Rhode Island gubernatorial election, 2010

Political offices
Preceded by Paul Tavares	Treasurer of Rhode Island; 2007–2011	Succeeded by Gina Raimondo
Party political offices
Preceded by Paul Tavares	Democratic nominee for General Treasurer of Rhode Island; 2006	Succeeded by Gina Raimondo
Preceded by Charlie Fogarty	Democratic nominee for Governor of Rhode Island; 2010	Succeeded by Gina Raimondo
