= Daniel Da Ponte =

American politician

Member of the Rhode Island Senate from the 14th district
- In office January 2003 – January 2019
- Preceded by: Aram Garabedian
- Succeeded by: Valarie Lawson

Member of the Rhode Island Senate from the 42nd district
- In office January 1999 – January 2003
- Preceded by: Paul Tavares
- Succeeded by: District abolished

Personal details
- Born: February 15, 1978 (age 48) Providence, Rhode Island, U.S.
- Party: Democratic
- Education: University of Rhode Island
- Profession: Founder, Managing Principal + Senior Financial Advisor, Axis Wealth Partners, LLC
- Committees: Chair, RI Senate Finance Committee 2009-2017
- Website: https://axiswp.com/dan/

Daniel Da Ponte (born February 15, 1978) is an American politician and was a Democratic member of the Rhode Island Senate representing District 14 from January 2003 to January 2019. Da Ponte served consecutively from January 1999 until January 2003 in the District 42 seat, and served as chair of the Senate Finance Committee from 2009 to 2018. Da Ponte left the Rhode Island Senate after choosing not to stand for re-election in the November 2018 general election, he was succeeded by teacher and labor leader Valerie Lawson. Da Ponte is of Azorean heritage.

== Education ==
Da Ponte earned his BS in business administration from University of Rhode Island and his MS in personal financial planning from Kansas State University.

== Elections ==
- 2012 Da Ponte was challenged in the September 11, 2012 Democratic Primary, winning by 72 votes with 2,053 votes (50.9%) against state Representative Roberto DaSilva, and was unopposed for the November 6, 2012 General election, winning with 8,218 votes.
- 1998 When District 42 incumbent Senator Paul Tavares ran for state treasurer and left the seat open, Da Ponte ran in the three-way September 15, 1998 Democratic Primary, winning with 1,106 votes (54.0%), and won the November 3, 1998 General election with 3,365 votes (68.7%) against Independent candidate Gerald Lynch.
- 2000 Da Ponte was unopposed for both the September 12, 2000 Democratic Primary, winning with 1,196 votes, and the November 7, 2000 General election, winning with 4,664 votes.
- 2002 Redistricted to District 14, and with incumbent Democratic Senator Aram Garabedian leaving the Legislature, Da Ponte was unopposed for both the September 10, 2002 Democratic Primary, winning with 2,276 votes, and the November 5, 2002 General election, winning with 5,627 votes.
- 2004 Da Ponte was unopposed for both the September 14, 2004 Democratic Primary, winning with 1,291 votes, and the November 2, 2004 General election, winning with 7,685 votes.
- 2006 Da Ponte was unopposed for both the September 12, 2006 Democratic Primary, winning with 1,959 votes, and the November 7, 2006 General election, winning with 7,788 votes.
- 2008 Da Ponte was unopposed for both the September 9, 2008 Democratic Primary, winning with 1,337 votes, and the November 4, 2008 General election, winning with 8,395 votes.
- 2010 Da Ponte was challenged in the September 23, 2010 Democratic Primary, winning with 1,849 votes (57.8%), and won the November 2, 2010 General election with 5,154 votes (64.5%) against Republican nominee David Sullivan.

Preceded by Paul Tavares	Senator, Rhode Island Senate; District 42; 1999 - 2003	Succeeded by District Abolished (Senate Districts Reduced in Number and Reconfigured Entirely)

Preceded by District Created (Senate Districts Reduced in Number and Reconfigured Entirely)	Senator, Rhode Island Senate; District 14; 2003 - 2019	Succeeded by Valerie Lawson
