= General Treasurer of Rhode Island =

Elected official in the United States

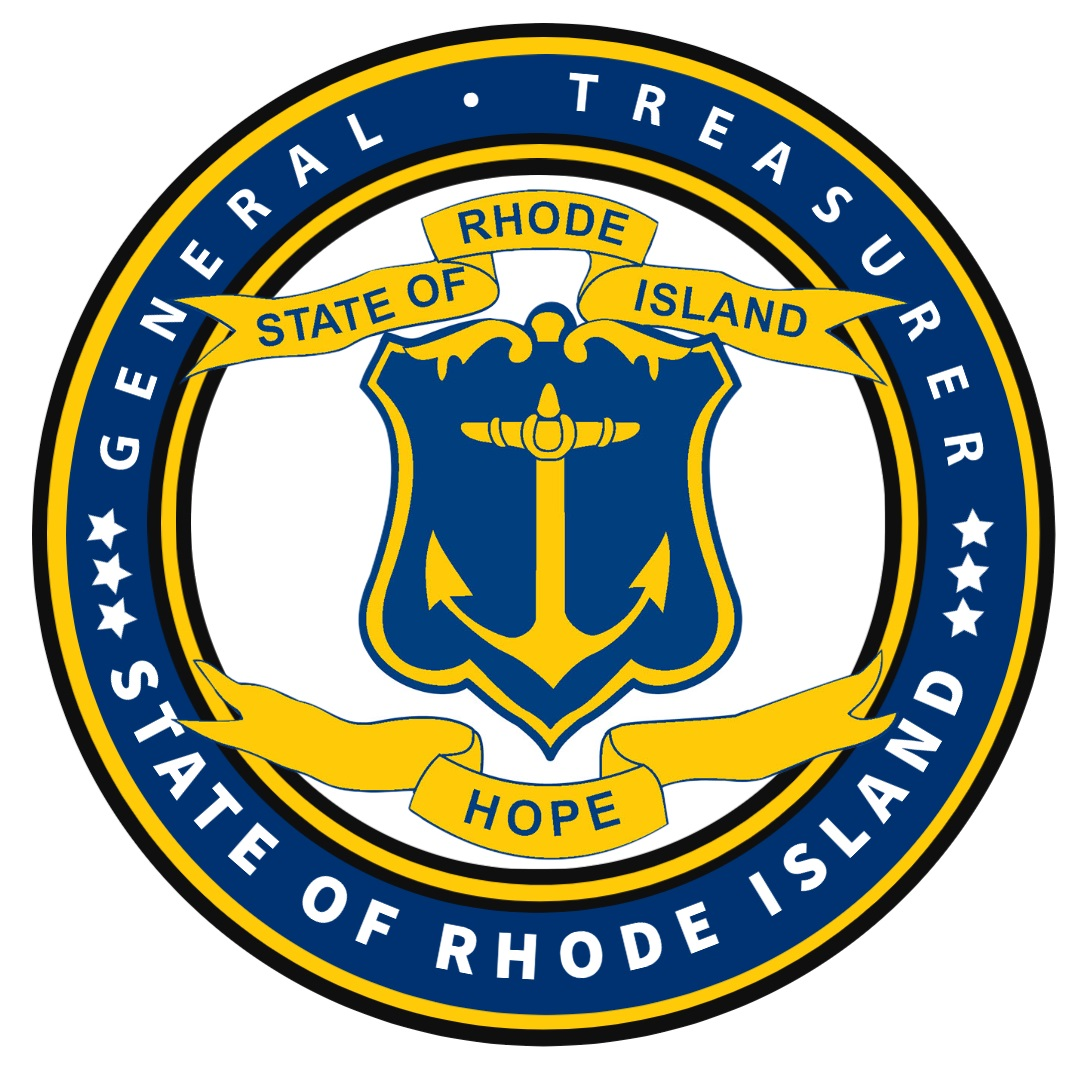

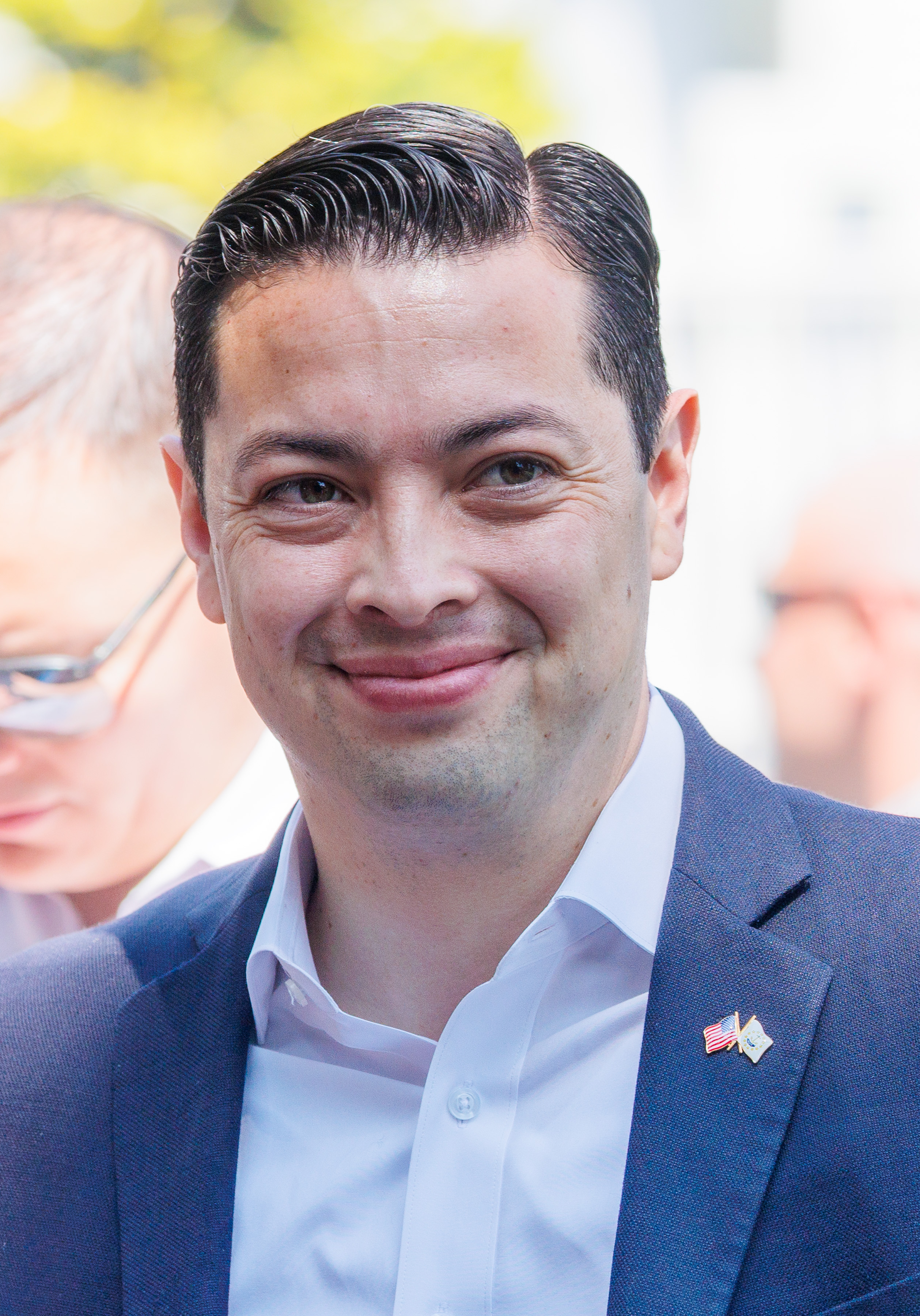
- Incumbent; James Diossa since January 3, 2023
- Department of Treasury
- Style: The Honorable
- Member of: Executive Branch
- Seat: State House, Providence, Rhode Island
- Term length: Four years Renewal once
- Constituting instrument: Constitution of Rhode Island
- Formation: 1663 (by law passed under The Royal Charter of 1663); 1842 (by ratification of the Constitution of Rhode Island)
- First holder: Stephen Cahoone (under 1842 Constitution)
- Succession: Election by joint session of the Rhode Island General Assembly
- Website: www.treasury.ri.gov

The general treasurer of Rhode Island is one of the five general state officers directly elected by the voters and serves as the custodian of state funds for the Rhode Island government. The general treasurer is tasked with managing the state's finances and serves on a variety of boards and commissions. The current general treasurer is Democrat James Diossa.

== Responsibilities ==
The general treasurer "is responsible for the safe and prudent management of the State’s finances." The Office of the General Treasurer has stated that its mission is " to protect the state's assets with sound financial investments, strengthen the state’s financial position, encourage economic growth, operate with transparency and accountability, and ensure Rhode Islanders benefit from exceptional performance through all of the programs the office manages." As part of this mission, the general treasurer's office "reconciles and disburses most state funds, issues general obligation notes and bonds, manages the investment of state funds, and oversees the retirement system for state employees, teachers, state police, judges and some municipal employees" and "is also responsible for the management of the Unclaimed Property Division and the Crime Victim Compensation Program as well as oversight of the investments for the state-sponsored CollegeBound fund."

The general treasurer also serves on the board of the Rhode Island Infrastructure Bank, the State Investment Commission, the State Retirement Board, the Public Finance Management Board, the Rhode Island Housing and Mortgage Finance Corporation, the Rhode Island Student Loan Authority and the Rhode Island School Building Authority, and he co-chairs of the Rhode Island School Building Task Force.

== Officeholders ==
#	Name	Political party	Term of office
1	Joseph Clark	Anti-Administration Democratic-Republican	1775–1792
2	Henry Sherburne	Federalist	1793–1807
3	Constant Tabor	Democratic-Republican	1808-1810
4	William Ennis	Federalist	1811-1816
5	Thomas G. Pitman	Democrat	1817-1838
6	John Sterne	Whig	1839
7	Stephen Cahoone	Law and Order	1840–1850
8	Edwin Wilbur	Democrat	1851–1853
10	Samuel B. Vernon	Whig	1854
11	Samuel A. Parker	Republican	1855–1865
12	George W. Tew	Republican	1866–1867
13	Samuel A. Parker	Republican	1868–1871
14	Samuel Clark	Republican	1872–1886
15	John G. Perry	Democrat	1887
16	Samuel Clark	Republican	1888–1889
17	John G. Perry	Democrat	1890
18	Samuel Clark	Republican	1891–1897
19	Clinton D. Skew	Republican	1898
20	Walter A. Read	Republican	1898–1918
21	Richard W. Jennings	Republican	1919–1922
22	Adolphus C. Knowles	Republican	1923–1924
23	Richard W. Jennings	Republican	1925–1926
24	George C. Clark	Republican	1927–1932
25	Antonio Prince	Democrat	1933–1935
26	Percival de St. Aubin	Republican	1936
27	Henry A. Roberge	Democrat	1937–1938
28	Thomas P. Hazard	Republican	1939–1940
29	Russell H. Handy	Democrat	1941–1948
30	Raymond Hawksley	Democrat	1949–1976
31	Anthony J. Solomon	Democrat	1977–1984
32	Roger N. Begin	Democrat	1985–1988
33	Anthony J. Solomon	Democrat	1989–1992
34	Nancy Mayer	Republican	1993–1999
35	Paul J. Tavares	Democrat	1999–2007
36	Frank T. Caprio	Democrat	2007–2011
37	Gina Raimondo	Democrat	2011–2015
38	Seth Magaziner	Democrat	2015–2023
39	James Diossa	Democrat	2023–present

== See also ==
- State of Rhode Island
- Governor of Rhode Island
- Secretary of State of Rhode Island
- Attorney General of Rhode Island
- Rhode Island General Assembly
