= Rufus Rand =

American businessman, military officer and politician (1892-1971)

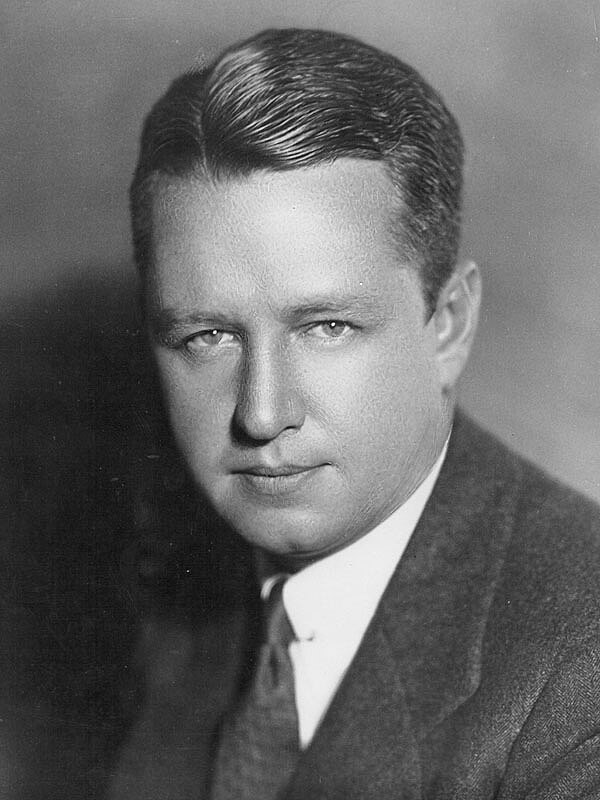
- Rand in 1928
- Born: May 25, 1892; Minneapolis, Minnesota, U.S.
- Died: October 15, 1971 (aged 79); Minneapolis, Minnesota, U.S.
- Education: Williams College
- Relatives: Sheldon Whitehouse (grandson); Tobias Mealey (grandfather); Alonzo Cooper Rand (grandfather); Charles S. Whitehouse (son-in-law)

Rufus Randall Rand Jr. (May 25, 1892 – October 15, 1971) was an American businessman and politician. He was the president of the Minneapolis Gas Company, which was founded by his family, Rand also served as the first mayor of Wayzata, Minnesota. He was the maternal grandfather of Sheldon Whitehouse, a United States Senator from Rhode Island.

== Biography ==
Rand was born in Minneapolis to Rufus Rand Sr, founder of the Minneapolis Gas Light Company (Minnegasco; now owned by CenterPoint Energy) and Susan Mealey Rand. The family had built the Rand House in Monticello, Minnesota as a summer estate in 1884, 8 years before his birth.

His two grandfathers were Minnesota State Senator Tobias Mealey and Mayor Alonzo Cooper Rand of Minneapolis. He attended Williams College, where he pursued an interest in aviation. He served as an aviator during World War I, flying for Lafayette Escadrille.

Rand was the President of the Minneapolis Gas Company, which was owned by his family. During the 1920s, he also entered politics and served as mayor of Wayzata, Minnesota. During this time he built Rand Tower in downtown Minneapolis. It was one of the city's tallest buildings when completed and served as the headquarters of the Minneapolis Gas Company. In 2020, the building was converted into a Marriot hotel.

He also built the Still Pond estate in Minnetonka in 1931. The estate contained a 25,000 square foot, 63-room mansion that cost US$400,000 (equivalent to $8,468,271 in 2025) to construct. He sold it to Cargill in 1944. The mansion remained in use by Cargill, serving as the headquarters for its corporate leadership until being demolished in 2020.
