= Sheldon Whitehouse =

American politician and attorney (born 1955)

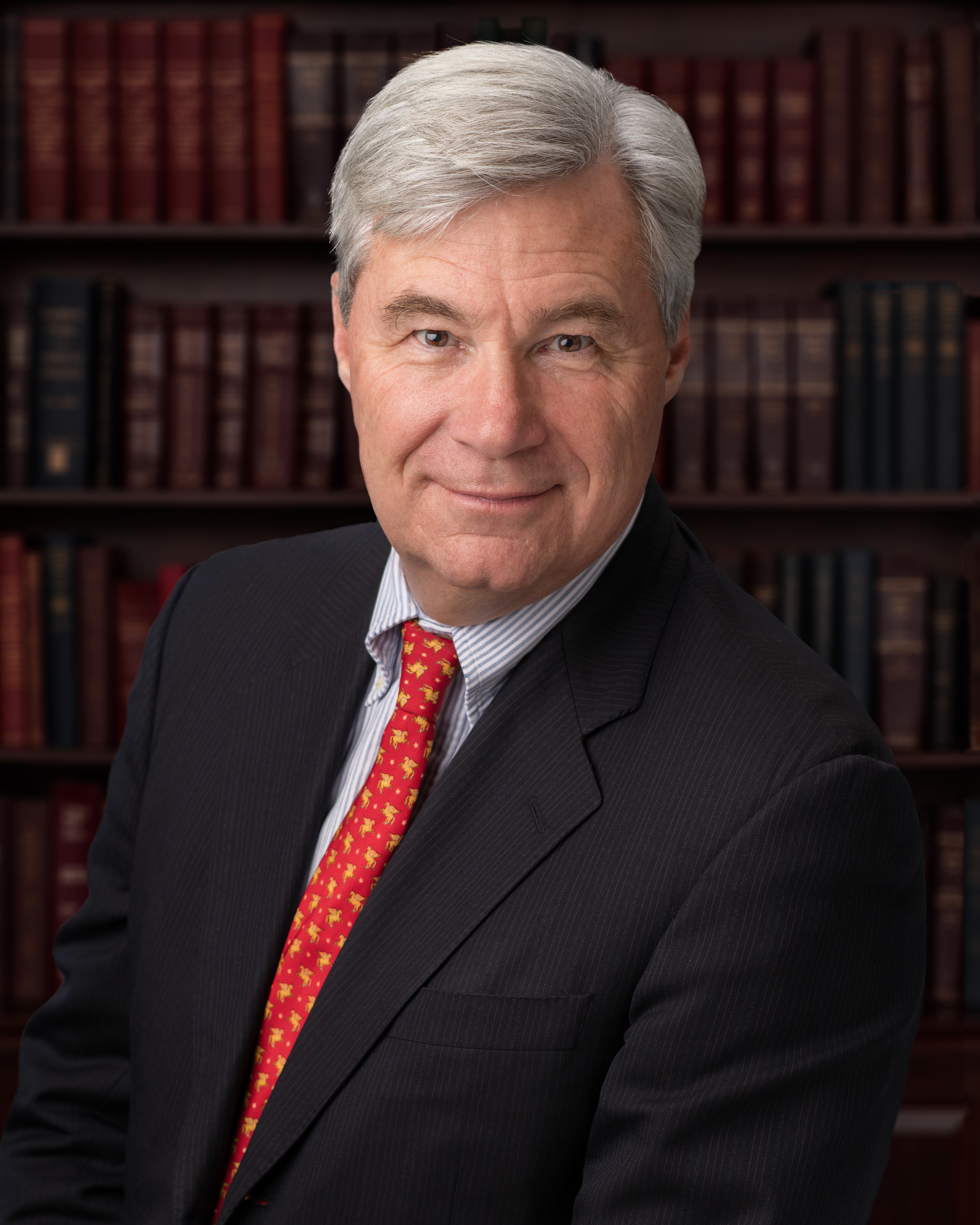
- Official portrait, 2019

United States Senator from Rhode Island
- Incumbent
- Assumed office January 3, 2007 Serving with Jack Reed
- Preceded by: Lincoln Chafee
Senate positions
Ranking Member of the Senate Environment Committee
Incumbent
Assumed office January 3, 2025
Preceded by	Shelley Moore Capito
Chair of the Senate Budget Committee
In office January 3, 2023 – January 3, 2025
Preceded by	Bernie Sanders
Succeeded by	Lindsey Graham
Chair of the Senate Narcotics Caucus
In office February 3, 2021 – January 3, 2025
Preceded by	John Cornyn
Succeeded by	John Cornyn

71st Attorney General of Rhode Island
- In office January 2, 1999 – January 7, 2003
- Governor: Lincoln Almond
- Preceded by: Jeffrey B. Pine
- Succeeded by: Patrick Lynch

United States Attorney for the District of Rhode Island
- In office January 20, 1993 – June 8, 1998
- President: Bill Clinton
- Preceded by: Lincoln Almond
- Succeeded by: Margaret Curran

Personal details
- Born: October 20, 1955 (age 71) New York City, New York, U.S.
- Party: Democratic
- Spouse: Sandra Thornton (m. 1986)
- Children: 2
- Parents: Charles Whitehouse (father); Mary Rand (mother)
- Relatives: Rufus Rand (grandfather); Edwin Sheldon Whitehouse (grandfather)
- Education: Yale University (BA); University of Virginia (JD)
- Website: Senate website Campaign website
- Sheldon Whitehouse's voice Sheldon Whitehouse questions witnesses on Guantanamo Bay detainees and torture during the war on terror Recorded December 7, 2021

Sheldon Whitehouse (born October 20, 1955) is an American politician and attorney serving as the junior United States senator from Rhode Island, a seat he has held since 2007. A member of the Democratic Party, he served as the United States Attorney for the District of Rhode Island from 1993 to 1998, and as the 71st attorney general of Rhode Island from 1999 to 2003. He was elected to the Senate in 2006, defeating Republican incumbent Lincoln Chafee. He was reelected in 2012, 2018, and 2024.

A political progressive and climate hawk, Whitehouse became chair of the United States Senate Committee on the Budget in 2023. He has given hundreds of Senate floor speeches about climate change and asserted that politically conservative "dark money" groups are conducting a campaign to take control of the U.S. government, specifically the Supreme Court of the United States, to prevent climate action, among other reasons.

== Early life and education ==
Whitehouse was born on October 20, 1955, in New York City, the son of Mary Celine (née Rand) and career diplomat Charles Sheldon Whitehouse, and grandson of diplomat Edwin Sheldon Whitehouse (1883–1965). Whitehouse's father served as the U.S. Ambassador to Thailand and Laos. Among his great-great-grandfathers were Henry John Whitehouse, a bishop of the Episcopal Church, and railroad executive Charles Crocker, who was a founder of the Central Pacific Railroad. Whitehouse graduated from St. Paul's School in Concord, New Hampshire, and in 1978 from Yale College. He received his Juris Doctor from the University of Virginia School of Law in 1982.

== Early career ==
Whitehouse worked as a clerk for Richard Neely, a justice of the Supreme Court of Appeals of West Virginia, from 1982 to 1983. He also worked in the Rhode Island Attorney General's office as a special assistant attorney general from 1985 to 1990, chief of the Regulatory Unit (which oversaw utilities) from 1988 to 1990, and as an assistant attorney general from 1989 to 1990.

Whitehouse worked as Rhode Island Governor Bruce Sundlun's executive counsel beginning in 1991, and was later tapped to serve as director of policy. He oversaw the state's response to the Rhode Island banking crisis that took place soon after Sundlun took office. In 1992, Sundlun appointed Whitehouse the state's Director of Business Regulation, where he oversaw the state's workers' compensation insurance system.

== Early political career ==
=== U.S. attorney ===
President Bill Clinton appointed Whitehouse United States Attorney for Rhode Island in 1994. Whitehouse held the position for four years. With the 1996 extortion conviction of mobster Gerard Ouimette, he was the first prosecutor to convict a member of organized crime under Clinton's "three-strikes law". Ouimette was sentenced to life imprisonment without parole.

=== Rhode Island Attorney General ===
In 1998, Whitehouse was elected Rhode Island Attorney General. He initiated a lawsuit against the lead paint industry that ended in a mistrial; the state later won a second lawsuit against former lead paint manufacturers Sherwin-Williams, Millennium Holdings, and NL Industries that found them responsible for creating a public nuisance. This decision, however, was unanimously overturned by the Rhode Island Supreme Court on July 1, 2008. The court found that under Rhode Island law it is the responsibility of property owners to abate and mitigate lead hazards.

When African-American Providence police officer Cornel Young Jr. was shot and killed by two fellow officers while he was off duty in January 2000, Whitehouse was criticized for not appointing an independent prosecutor to investigate the shooting. Later that year, Whitehouse was criticized when 15-year-old Jennifer Rivera, a witness in a murder case, was shot by a relative of the man she was to testify against later that year.

=== 2002 gubernatorial election ===
Whitehouse ran for the Democratic nomination for governor of Rhode Island in 2002. He lost the primary election to former state senator Myrth York, who was unsuccessful in the general election against Republican Donald Carcieri.

== U.S. Senate ==
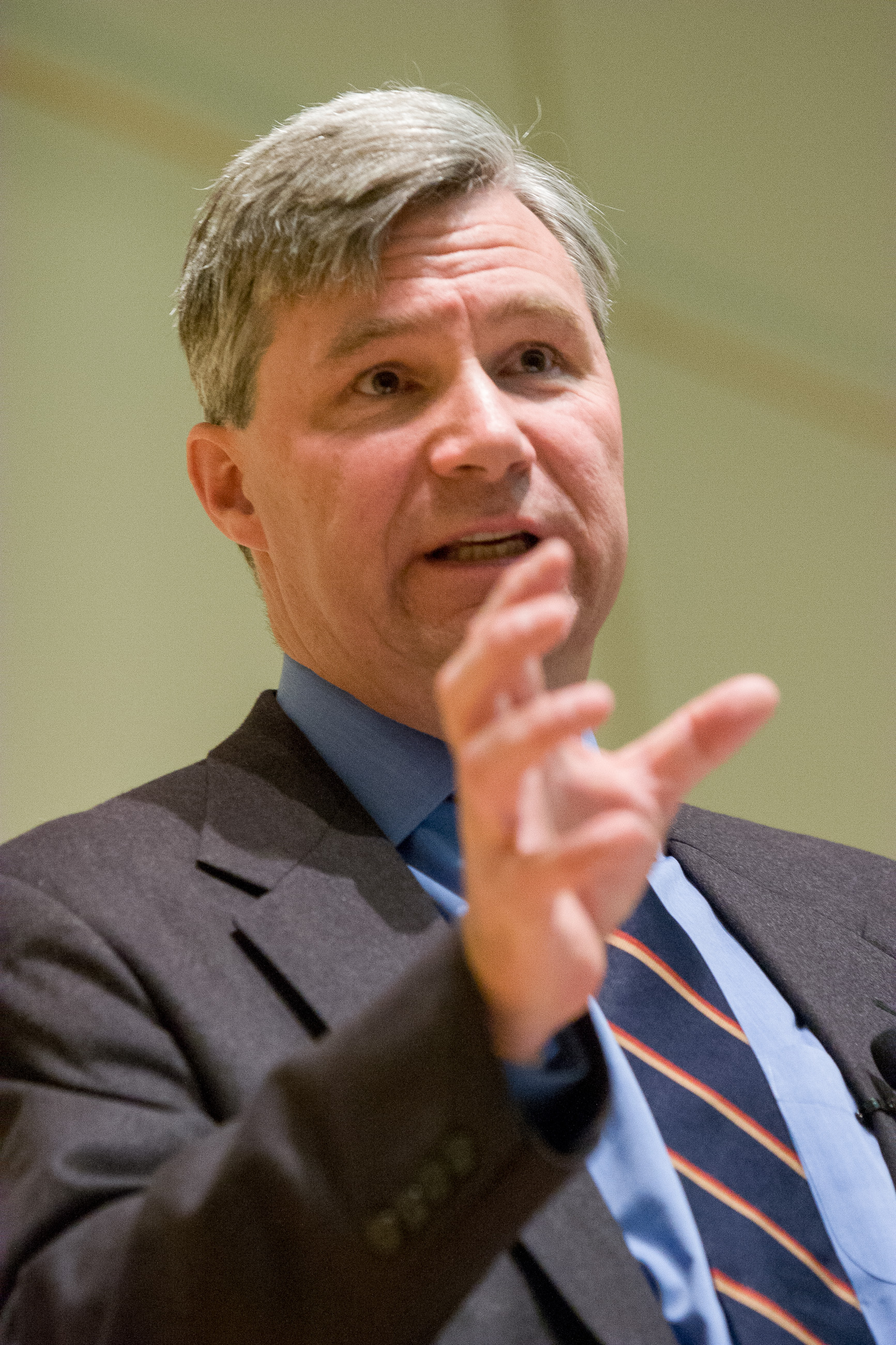
Whitehouse speaking in 2008

=== Elections ===
==== 2006 ====
Whitehouse launched his campaign for the U.S. Senate seat held by Lincoln Chafee, a Republican, on April 4, 2005. By September 30, he had raised over $600,000 for his campaign, including $360,000 of his own, more than doubling Chafee's fundraising. Whitehouse campaigned heavily against the Iraq War and the United States's dependence on foreign oil. After winning the Democratic primary by a large margin, he defeated Chafee with 53 percent of the vote in the 2006 general election. With his victory, Whitehouse became the first Democrat to win this Senate seat since John Pastore in 1970.

==== 2012 ====
On November 6, 2012, Whitehouse won reelection to a second term in office, defeating Republican nominee Barry Hinckley by 30 points, with 64.9% of the vote.

==== 2018 ====
On November 6, 2018, Whitehouse was reelected to a third term, defeating Republican nominee Robert Flanders by 23 points.

==== 2024 ====
On November 5, 2024, Whitehouse was reelected to a fourth term, defeating Republican nominee Patricia Morgan by 20 points.

=== Tenure ===
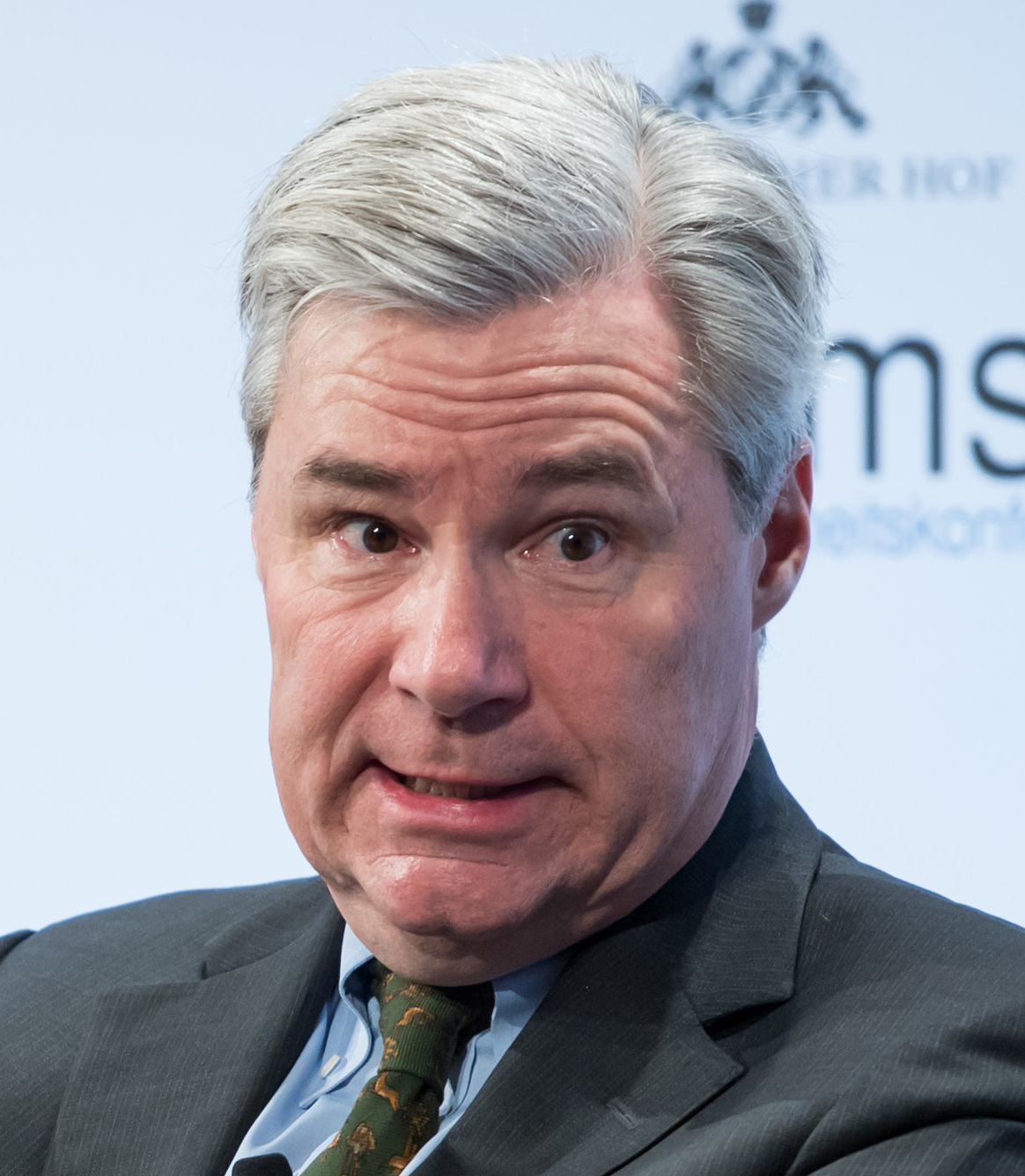
Whitehouse during the Munich Security Conference 2018

In 2007, the National Journal ranked Whitehouse the second-most liberal senator.

In the spring of 2007, Whitehouse joined other senators in calling for the resignation of Alberto Gonzales, the United States Attorney General. After Gonzales's first appearance before the Senate Judiciary Committee related to the controversy, Whitehouse told NPR, "[Gonzales] had a hard sell to make to me, and he didn't make it." He continued to question Gonzales's service in the NSA warrantless surveillance controversy.

He voted to confirm Elena Kagan and Sonia Sotomayor to the Supreme Court.

Upon Attorney General Eric Holder's announcement in September 2014 of his intention to step down, some speculated that Whitehouse could be nominated as Holder's replacement.

In February 2016, after U.S. Supreme Court Associate Justice Antonin Scalia died, USA Today named Whitehouse as a possible nominee to fill the vacancy. Whitehouse's service as a U.S. Attorney and as Attorney General of Rhode Island gives him both legislative experience and experience as a legal official, though not as a judge. Whitehouse was ultimately not nominated.

In August 2024, Whitehouse said that if Democrats won control of the White House, Senate, and House of Representatives in the 2024 elections, they would be "virtually certain" to pass a Supreme Court reform bill by a simple majority, evading the 60-vote requirement for cloture. Whitehouse said Democrats would include 18-year term limits for Supreme Court justices and establish ethics and recusal rules in an omnibus package that would also include a bill creating a national right to abortion.

Whitehouse supported the candidacy of Graham Platner, the Democratic nominee in the 2026 United States Senate election in Maine. In June 2026, The New York Times reported allegations that Platner engaged in disturbing and physically threatening behavior toward women he had dated. When asked about these allegations, Whitehouse said: "Seems like a lot of nothing. I mean, the only one who had anything to say that seemed 'unsettling' was a woman who works for right-wing political operations." On July 7, 2026, one day after reports emerged that Platner had been accused of sexual assault, Whitehouse withdrew his support for him. Whitehouse later told Jake Tapper and The Dispatch that he remained skeptical of Platner's initial accuser, saying, "No corroboration and a highly motivated person working for the politicians on the other side—I think there are grounds for skepticism." The Dispatch noted that Platner's initial accuser "has not worked in politics for years, and there was in fact corroboration for her accusations in the form of a diary entry and comments she had made to friends years ago."

In February 2025, the ethics watchdog group Foundation for Accountability and Civic Trust filed a complaint accusing Whitehouse of violating ethics policies by advocating for legislation to award his wife's nonprofit, Ocean Conservancy, $7 million in federal funding. The ethics complaint seeks to clarify whether it is a conflict of interest for Sandra to earn money from a group that has benefited from legislation Whitehouse supported.

==== Allegations of insider trading and failure to disclose stock purchases ====
Whitehouse has faced some criticism for alleged insider trading, avoiding big losses by trading stocks after top federal officials warned congressional leaders of "the coming economic cataclysm" on September 16, 2008. After meeting with Federal Reserve Chairman Ben Bernanke and Treasury Secretary Henry Paulson on September 16, and being briefed on the unfolding financial crisis, Whitehouse sold a number of positions, valued between $250,000 and $600,000, over the next six days. After coming under scrutiny due to possible insider trading, a spokesperson for his office denied it, saying Whitehouse "is not actively involved in the management" of the implicated accounts and that he "neither directed his financial advisor to undertake any transaction during that time, nor ever took advantage of any exclusive or secret information".

In March 2022, Business Insider reported that Whitehouse had violated the STOCK Act, which is designed to combat insider trading, by failing to disclose two personal stock purchases by the federal deadline. The stocks in question were for the Target Corporation and Tesla, Inc. Whitehouse's office acknowledged that he missed the disclosure deadline, blaming it on a staff transition in his office.

In September 2022, an investigation by The New York Times found that Whitehouse was among the members of Congress who had bought or sold stock that intersected with his congressional work, including trading stock in public companies that came before the committees on which he serves.

=== Committee assignments ===
Sources:

- Committee on Budget
- Committee on Environment and Public Works (Ranking Member)
  - Subcommittee on Oversight
  - Subcommittee on Superfund, Toxics and Environmental Health
  - Subcommittee on Water and Wildlife
- Committee on Finance
- Committee on the Judiciary
- United States Senate Caucus on International Narcotics Control (Chair)
- Commission on Security and Cooperation in Europe

=== Caucus memberships ===
- Healthy Kids Caucus
- International Conservation Caucus (Co-chair)
- Senate Oceans Caucus (Co-chair)
- Afterschool Caucuses

== Political positions ==
According to Politico, during Whitehouse's chairmanship of the Senate Budget Committee, he turned the committee into a de facto climate panel. He has sought to subpoena the executives of leading oil companies and to impose a carbon tax.

=== D.C. statehood ===
In a 2018 interview with the Providence Journal, Whitehouse expressed opposition to D.C. statehood. He was dismissive of efforts to give District residents representation in Congress, suggesting they should be satisfied with the amount of federal activity nearby. In July 2020, he cosponsored a Senate bill to grant D.C. statehood.

=== Environmental issues ===
In November 2011, Whitehouse introduced the Safeguarding America's Future and Environment (SAFE) Act, a bill that would require federal natural resource agencies to be concerned with the long-term effects of climate change, encourage states to prepare natural resource adaptation plans, and "create a science advisory board to ensure that the planning uses the best available science".

Of a proposed action on mandatory emissions curbs, Whitehouse told The Hill, "I am not hearing anybody on our side, even the people who are more economically concerned about the climate legislation who come from coal states, that sort of thing, saying, 'What are we going to say about this, is this a problem?'"

Whitehouse dismissed the Climatic Research Unit conspiracy theory: "Climategate should properly be known as Climategate-gate because it was the scandal that was phony."

Whitehouse has said that the development of alternate energy sources, including solar power, will eliminate U.S. dependence on foreign oil. He has cited the installation of new solar panels on three new bank branches in Rhode Island, saying that the projects "created jobs, they put people to work, they lowered the cost for these banks of their electrical energy, and they get us off foreign oil and away, step by step, from these foreign entanglements that we have to get into to defend our oil supply". PolitiFact investigated the economics of renewable energy and determined that solar and wind investments would not have a large effect on oil consumption, calling Whitehouse's comments "mostly false" due to "this misimpression—and because of the other inaccuracies in Whitehouse's speech".

In a May 29, 2015, Washington Post editorial, Whitehouse advocated prosecution of members of the fossil fuel industry under the Racketeer Influenced and Corrupt Organizations Act (RICO).

In April 2019, Whitehouse was one of 12 senators to sign a bipartisan letter to top senators on the Appropriations Subcommittee on Energy and Water Development advocating that the Energy Department be granted maximum funding for carbon capture, utilization and storage (CCUS), arguing that American job growth could be stimulated by investment in capturing carbon emissions and expressing disagreement with President Trump's 2020 budget request to combine the two federal programs that do carbon capture research.

In July 2024, Whitehouse authored legislation to prohibit the commercial farming of octopuses nationwide, after Washington and California enacted octopus farming bans. He cited environmental and animal welfare concerns, telling NPR: "Octopuses are among the most intelligent creatures in the oceans. And they belong at sea, not suffering on a factory farm." Whitehouse reintroduced the legislation in 2025.

Since 2012, Whitehouse has spoken on the Senate floor about climate change every week the Senate has been in session, giving his 250th speech on the issue on July 24, 2019.

=== Foreign policy ===
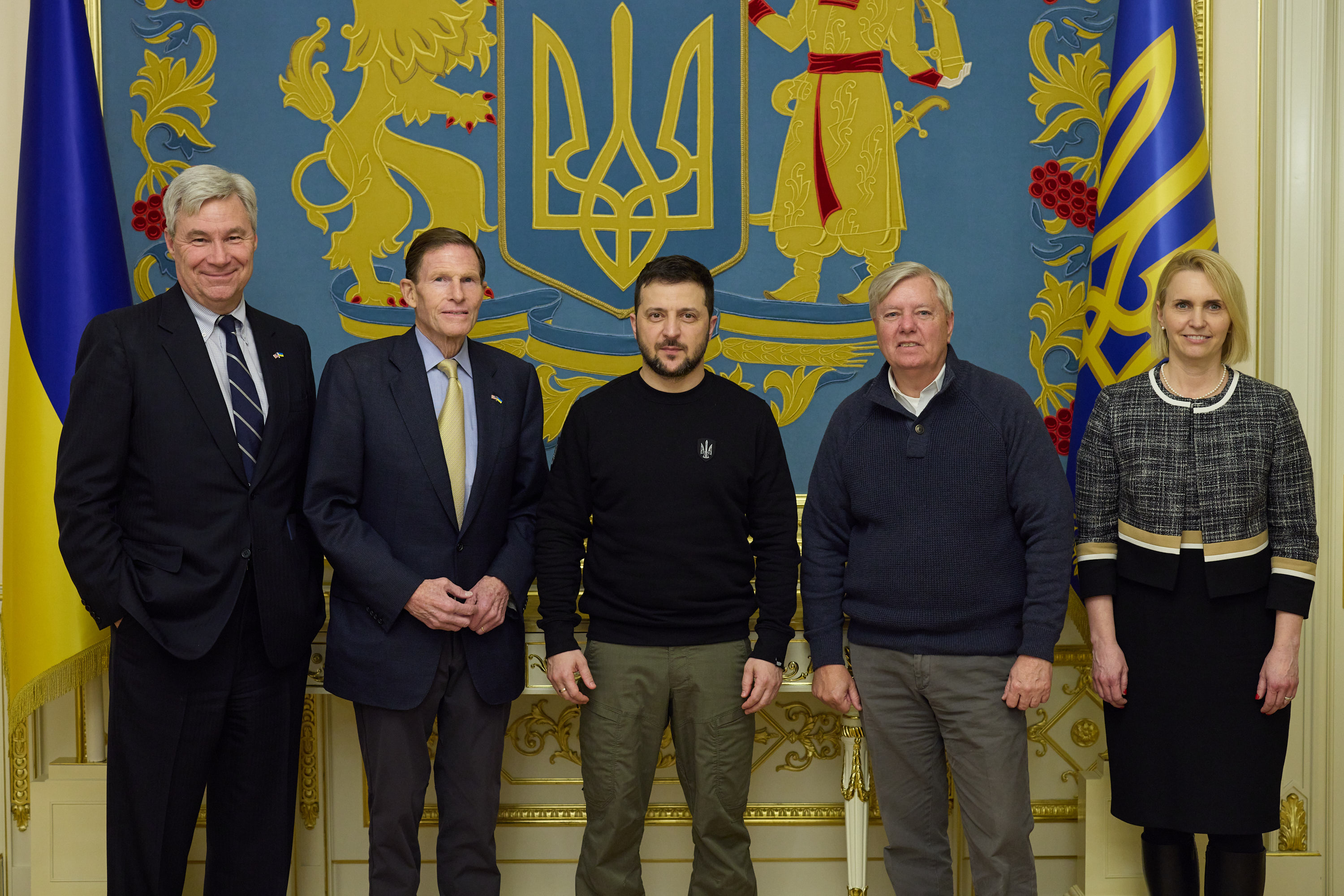
A bipartisan U.S. Congressional delegation—Senators Lindsey Graham, Richard Blumenthal, and Sheldon Whitehouse—visits Kyiv, January 20, 2023, to meet with Ukrainian officials

Whitehouse supported a vote that would limit continuing United States support for Saudi Arabian–led operations in Yemen. Initially, he was one of the two Democratic holdouts in the Senate, but an activist effort, including mobilizing fans of the Rhode Island band Downtown Boys, contributed to changing his position.

While supporting legislation in 2025 that increased defense cooperation with Israel, Whitehouse said he was ardently pro-Israel. On July 30, 2025, Whitehouse voted against S.J.Res. 34, a resolution introduced by Bernie Sanders aimed at blocking the sale to Israel of tank rounds, bombs, and precision-guided munitions. Whitehouse has a long-standing relationship with the American Israel Public Affairs Committee (AIPAC), primarily through legislative collaboration and campaign endorsements. He co-authored the U.S.-Israel Cybersecurity Cooperation Enhancement Act with Senators Jacky Rosen and Todd Young. This legislation, supported by AIPAC, aims to establish a grant program to foster joint research and development between U.S. and Israeli entities to combat evolving cyber threats from adversaries like Iran.

In April 2026, Whitehouse joined most Senate Democrats in supporting a resolution to block a sale of bulldozers to Israel, but was one of 11 to oppose another resolution voted on the same day to block another sale to Israel of 1,000-pound bombs.

=== Gun policy ===
Whitehouse supports gun control. In 2022, he voted for the Bipartisan Safer Communities Act, a gun reform bill introduced following a deadly school shooting at Robb Elementary School in Uvalde, Texas. The bill enhanced background checks for firearm purchasers under the age of 21, provided funding for school-based mental health services, and partially closed the gun show loophole and boyfriend loophole.

=== Health care ===
Whitehouse voted for the Affordable Care Act (also known as Obamacare). During its passage, he cautioned that conservative opposition to the bill was moving toward historical instances of mob violence.

In December 2009, Whitehouse said "birthers", "fanatics", and "people running around in right-wing militia and Aryan support groups" opposed Obamacare.

In January 2025, Talking Points Memo reported that Whitehouse was "actively considering" voting to confirm anti-vaccine activist Robert F. Kennedy Jr., Trump's nominee for Secretary of Health and Human Services. Whitehouse's reported reasons for considering Kennedy's nomination were his lifelong friendship with Kennedy and specific issues with Rhode Island's healthcare system that needed regulatory flexibility from the Health and Human Services Department. During Kennedy's confirmation hearing on January 29, Whitehouse said that he supports mandatory vaccinations, telling Kennedy: "If you want to move from advocacy to public responsibility, Americans are going to need to hear a clear and trustworthy recantation of what you have said on vaccinations, including a promise from you never to say vaccines aren't medically safe when they in fact are, and making indisputably clear that you support mandatory vaccinations against diseases where that will keep people safe." Whitehouse ultimately voted not to confirm Kennedy.

=== LGBTQ rights ===
In September 2014, Whitehouse was one of 69 Congress members to sign a letter to Sylvia Burwell, the Commissioner of Food and Drugs, requesting that the Food and Drug Administration revise its policy banning donation of corneas and other tissues by men who have had sex with another man in the preceding five years. He has publicly supported reintroducing the Equal Rights Amendment.

=== Political spending ===
Whitehouse has been a staunch critic of so-called "dark money", or political spending by nonprofit organizations that are not required to disclose their donors. According to Roll Call, "Whitehouse hasn't been as convincing as he'd hoped in his campaign to curb conservative anonymous donors and their influence on the Supreme Court—even as that 'dark money' now floods in to support the judicial nomination process his party controls." Roll Call wrote that when talking about undisclosed political spending, Whitehouse "can sound conspiratorial". Ilya Shapiro of the Cato Institute, serving as a witness at one of Whitehouse's congressional hearings about political spending, said Whitehouse was on a "quixotic crusade". The New York Times and The Wall Street Journal have complained that, while positioning himself as someone opposed to dark money, Whitehouse has a history of accepting dark money and overlooking it when such contributions flow to his Democratic colleagues.

Whitehouse critiqued conservative dark money groups who backed Supreme Court Justice Brett Kavanaugh's nomination. The Washington Post criticized him for not addressing anti-Kavanaugh groups with the same scrutiny.

In 2019, Whitehouse announced that he intended to introduce legislation that would require groups that file amicus curiae briefs with the U.S. Supreme Court to disclose their donors.

Whitehouse has received over $175,000 in campaign donations from the League of Conservation Voters. Billionaire Tom Steyer has donated $17,300 directly to Whitehouse since 2006. Other donors to Whitehouse include the Sierra Club and the Natural Resources Defense Council.

In March 2021, Whitehouse convened a Senate Judiciary subcommittee hearing titled "What's Wrong with the Supreme Court: The Big-Money Assault on Our Judiciary". He alleged that a "multi-hundred million dollar covert operation" influences the U.S. Supreme Court.

Also in March 2021, Whitehouse wrote U.S. Attorney General Merrick Garland a letter asking him to investigate "what appears to have been a politically constrained and perhaps fake FBI investigation into alleged misconduct by now-Supreme Court Justice Brett Kavanaugh." Senator Ben Sasse critiqued Whitehouse's allegation that the FBI investigation of Kavanaugh had been "fake", saying "This kind of paranoid obsession is Nixonian poison to public trust."

In the 2024 election cycle, AIPAC PAC endorsed Whitehouse for reelection.

On July 9, 2024, it was reported that Whitehouse and Senator Ron Wyden sent an official letter the previous week to U.S. Attorney General Merrick Garland requesting that he appoint a special prosecutor to investigate Justice Clarence Thomas for possible tax and ethics violations.

== Personal life ==
In 1986, Whitehouse married Sandra Thornton, a marine biologist and granddaughter of James Worth Thornton and Elena Mumm Thornton Wilson. They live in Rhode Island with their two children. Whitehouse is Episcopalian.

Whitehouse is a great-great-grandson of Episcopal Bishop Henry John Whitehouse, Minneapolis Mayor Alonzo Cooper Rand, and businessmen Tobias Mealey and Charles Crocker. Among his distant ancestors are William Bradford, governor of Plymouth Colony, and theologian Archibald Alexander.

=== Membership in Bailey's Beach Club ===
Whitehouse's longtime ties to the elite private club Bailey's Beach have attracted scrutiny. The New York Times called the club a haven for members of America's "ruling class" and various media outlets have said it has an all-white membership. In June 2021, Whitehouse defended his family's membership in the club. Asked whether the club had any nonwhite members, he replied, "I think the people who are running the place are still working on that, and I'm sorry it hasn't happened yet." Asked whether such clubs should continue to exist, he said, "It's a long tradition in Rhode Island." A spokesperson for Whitehouse said the club did not have any restrictive racial policies and that it had members of color. Whitehouse declined to provide details of the club's membership, and the club initially refused to answer questions about its policies or membership. The club ultimately put out a statement saying reports that all its members were white were "inaccurate and false". The club's president urged members to use "restraint" when speaking to the media. Whitehouse said he would not ask his family members to resign from the club because "they are on the right side of pushing for improvements" and "my relationship with my family is not one in which I tell them what to do".

Whitehouse later acknowledged belonging to the Ida Lewis Yacht Club, which he said lacked diversity, saying, "Failing to address the sailing club's lack of diversity is squarely on me, and something for which I am sorry."

== Depictions in media ==
John Rothman portrayed Whitehouse in the 2019 film The Report.

Pete Davidson portrayed Whitehouse in the cold open of the season 44 premiere of Saturday Night Live.

== Publications ==
- Captured: The Corporate Infiltration of American Democracy. Sheldon Whitehouse, Melanie Wachtell Stinnett. New Press, New York, 2019 ISBN 978-1620974766
- The Scheme: How the Right Wing Used Dark Money to Capture the Supreme Court. Sheldon Whitehouse, Jennifer Mueller. New Press, New York, Oct. 2022. ISBN 978-1-62097-738-5

== Electoral history ==
Rhode Island gubernatorial Democratic primary results, 2002
Party	Candidate	Votes	%
Democratic	Myrth York	46,806	39.16
Democratic	Sheldon Whitehouse	45,880	38.39
Democratic	Antonio J. Pires	26,838	22.45
Total votes		119,524	100.00

United States Senate Democratic primary results, 2006
Party	Candidate	Votes	%
Democratic	Sheldon Whitehouse	69,290	81.53
Democratic	Christopher F. Young	8,939	10.52
Democratic	Carl Sheeler	6,755	7.95
Total votes		84,984	100.00

United States Senate election in Rhode Island, 2006
Party	Candidate	Votes	%	±%
Democratic	Sheldon Whitehouse	206,043	53.52%	+12.37%
Republican	Lincoln Chafee (incumbent)	178,950	46.48%	−10.40%
Majority		27,093	7.04%	−8.69%
Turnout		384,993		
Democratic gain from Republican		Swing		

United States Senate Democratic primary results, 2012
Party	Candidate	Votes	%
Democratic	Sheldon Whitehouse (incumbent)	60,223	100
Total votes		60,223	100

United States Senate election in Rhode Island, 2012
Party	Candidate	Votes	%	±%
Democratic	Sheldon Whitehouse (incumbent)	271,034	64.81%	+11.29%
Republican	Barry Hinckley	146,222	34.97%	−11.51%
n/a	Write-ins	933	0.22%	N/A
Total votes		418,189	100.0%	N/A
Democratic hold				

United States Senate Democratic primary results, 2018
Party	Candidate	Votes	%
Democratic	Sheldon Whitehouse (incumbent)	89,140	76.79%
Democratic	Patricia J. Fontes	26,947	23.21%
Total votes		116,087	100%

United States Senate election in Rhode Island, 2018
Party	Candidate	Votes	%	±%
Democratic	Sheldon Whitehouse (incumbent)	231,477	61.45%	−3.36%
Republican	Robert Flanders	144,421	38.33%	+3.36%
Write-in		840	0.22%	N/A
Total votes		376,738	100%	N/A
Democratic hold				

United States Senate Democratic primary results, 2024
Party	Candidate	Votes	%
Democratic	Sheldon Whitehouse (incumbent)	49,401	83.77%
Democratic	Michael Costa	9,572	16.23%
Total votes		58,973	100.0%

United States Senate election in Rhode Island, 2024
Party	Candidate	Votes	%	±%
Democratic	Sheldon Whitehouse (incumbent)	294,665	59.90%	−1.54%
Republican	Patricia Morgan	196,039	39.85%	+1.52%
Write-in		1,244	0.25%	+0.03%
Total votes		491,948	100%	N/A
Democratic hold				

Legal offices
Preceded by Lincoln Almond	United States Attorney for the District of Rhode Island; 1993–1998	Succeeded by Margaret Curran
Preceded by Jeffrey B. Pine	Attorney General of Rhode Island; 1999–2003	Succeeded by Patrick Lynch
Party political offices
Preceded by Sara Quinn	Democratic nominee for Attorney General of Rhode Island; 1998	Succeeded by Patrick Lynch
Preceded by Robert Weygand	Democratic nominee for U.S. Senator from Rhode Island (Class 1); 2006, 2012, 2018, 2024	Most recent
U.S. Senate
Preceded by Lincoln Chafee	U.S. Senator (Class 1) from Rhode Island; 2007–present Served alongside: Jack Reed	Incumbent
Preceded by John Cornyn	Chair of the Senate Narcotics Caucus; 2021–2025	Succeeded by John Cornyn
Preceded by Bernie Sanders	Chair of the Senate Budget Committee; 2023–2025	Succeeded by Lindsey Graham
Preceded by Shelley Moore Capito	Ranking Member of the Senate Environment Committee; 2025–present	Incumbent
U.S. order of precedence (ceremonial)
Preceded by Lisa Murkowski	Order of precedence of the United States as United States Senator	Succeeded by Bernie Sanders
Preceded by Amy Klobuchar	United States senators by seniority 16th	Succeeded by John Barrasso
