= Tobias G. Mealey House =

Historic house in Minnesota, United States

- Formerly listed on the U.S. National Register of Historic Places
- The Tobias G. Mealey House in 2020

- Location within Minnesota Location within the United States
- Location: Territorial Road, Monticello, Minnesota
- Coordinates: 45°17′53.7″N 93°47′2.5″W
- Area: 2 acres (0.81 ha)
- Built: 1855
- Architect: Tobias Mealey
- Architectural style: Greek Revival
- NRHP reference No.: 76001082

Significant dates
- Added to NRHP: December 12, 1976
- Removed from NRHP: January 10, 2020

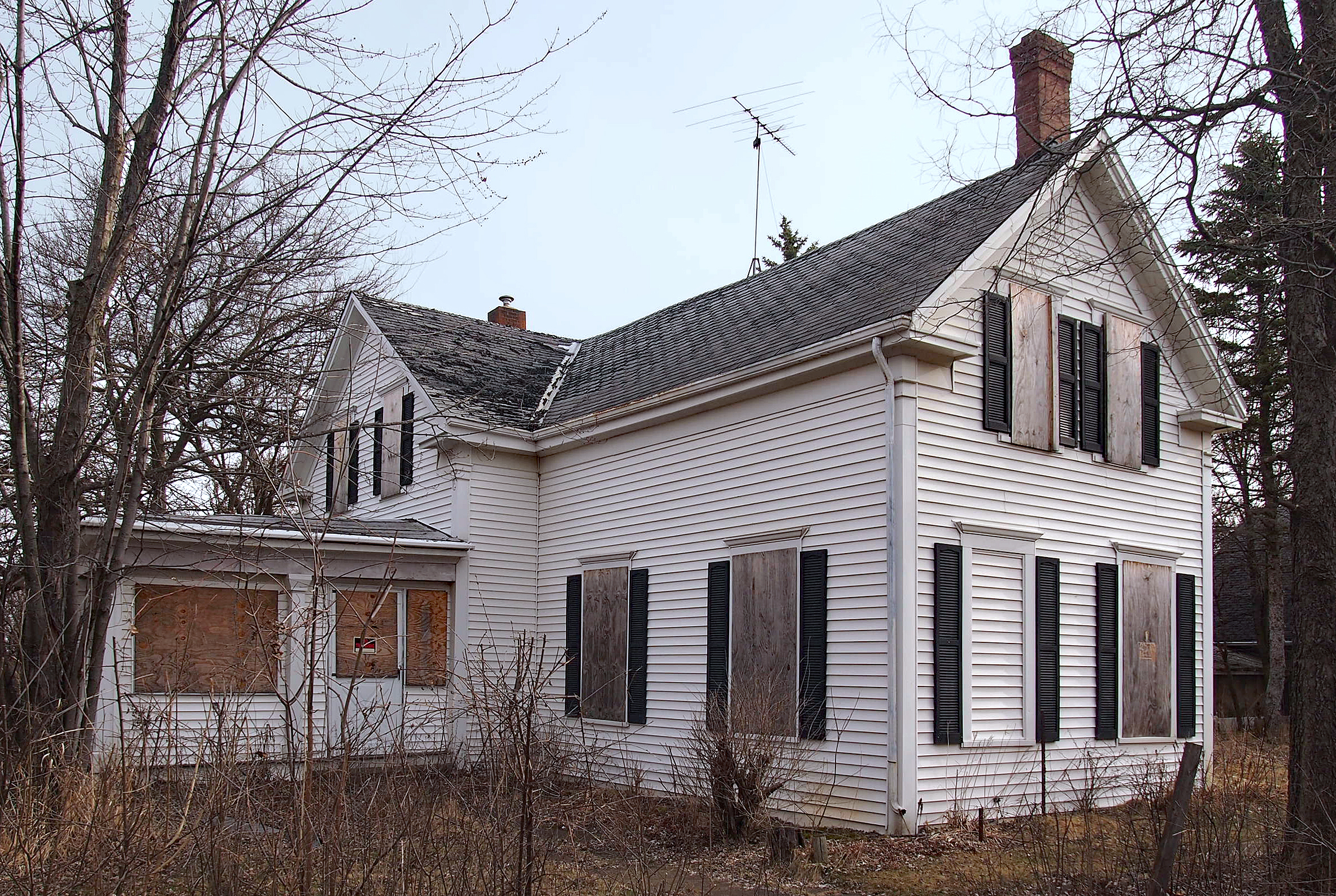
The Mealey House from the southwest in 2016

The Tobias G. Mealey House is a historic house in Monticello, Minnesota, United States. Its original section was built in 1855 by Tobias Mealey (1823–1904). The Mealey family made numerous additions to the house throughout the latter 19th century, and later owners added a large wing to the east. The house was listed on the National Register of Historic Places in 1976 for having local significance in the themes of commerce, exploration/settlement, and politics/government. It was nominated for its association with Mealey, an influential local settler, entrepreneur, and politician. It was delisted in 2020.

== Description ==
The Tobias G. Mealey House stands in seclusion on a thickly vegetated hill on the outskirts of Monticello's historic core. The original section is a simple two-story frame building with gables adorned with open pediments. The main entrance was on the west façade, which was spanned at one time by a colonnaded porch. The house gradually developed a rambling, complex structure with the addition of porches, gables, chimneys, and rooms, including a kitchen and summer kitchen extending to the east, and the main entrance shifted to the southeast corner. However a consistent exterior treatment of narrow-lap clapboard maintained uniformity. Later owners added a full wing to the east, which contained a garage and antique shop at the time of the house's National Register nomination in 1976.

== History ==
Tobias Mealey grew up in New Brunswick, Canada, but went west in his late 20s to participate in the California Gold Rush. Returning to New Brunswick in 1852 he passed through Minnesota and liked what he saw there. In 1855 he married Catherine Prescott and together they emigrated to Minnesota. Saint Paul was too well established for him and Minneapolis had yet to come into prominence, so Mealey opted to settle in Monticello, then still called Moritzious. He sited their house on a hill away from the Mississippi riverfront to get away from the boatmen and lumberjacks he deemed unsavory.

Mealey invested in several businesses, including a sawmill, two factories, and a general store, helping to grow Monticello's economy. He also farmed the property around the house. Active in politics, he served in some local judicial positions before running for office in the Minnesota Legislature as a Democrat, where he served several terms in the 1870s. He forged connections with other influential Minnesotans, selling land to Thomas Lowry for a summer home and becoming close friends with railroad magnate James J. Hill.

Tobias and Catherine Mealey had two sons and three daughters, and their growing family prompted successive additions to the house. In 1884 their daughter Susan married Rufus Rand, then vice-president of the Minneapolis Gas Light Company. As a wedding gift, the Mealeys gave the couple a large lot next to their own, upon which Susan designed the 30-room Rand House as a summer home. James J. Hill had a railroad spur constructed nearby for the convenience of his friend's wedding guests.

Tobias Mealey died in 1904, whereupon Catherine moved in with one of their daughters. The Mealey family continued to use the house as a summer home until about 1940. It stood vacant until 1947, when it was purchased by Carl and Jeanette Sebey, who undertook a restoration. After the Sebeys moved out the house suffered another period of vacancy during which it was vandalized, inhabited by skunks, and encroached on by vegetation. Antique dealers Bob and Marion Jameson purchased the property in 1965 and began restorations again. As of the 2010s, though, the house appears to be vacant once more.

== See also ==
- National Register of Historic Places listings in Wright County, Minnesota
