= List of killings by law enforcement officers in the United States, 2000 =

This is a list of people reported killed by non-military law enforcement officers in the United States in 2000, whether in the line of duty or not, and regardless of reason or method. The listing documents the occurrence of a death, making no implications regarding wrongdoing or justification on the part of the person killed or officer involved. Killings are arranged by date of the incident that caused death. Different death dates, if known, are noted in the description. The table below lists 93 people.

== 2000 ==
| Date | Name (age) of deceased | Race | State (city) | Description |
|---|---|---|---|---|
| 2000-12-31 | David Eugene Coomes (52) | Unknown | Texas (Houston) | Coomes was shot to death by Harris County sheriff's deputies who were responding to a disturbance call. Coomes, who was drunk and sitting outside his home with a shotgun in his lap, was shot in his chest, shoulders, abdomen, arm, back, ear, and head. |
| 2000-12-28 | Samuel James | Unknown | U.S. Virgin Islands (St. Thomas) | Police were called after James's girlfriend reported he had attacked her. Police shot James after he tried to attack them with a machete, according to police. |
| 2000-12-24 | James Culberson | White | New York (Brooklyn) | Killed along with Jonathan Lynch |
| 2000-12-24 | Jonathan Lynch | Unknown | New York (Brooklyn) | Killed along with James Culberson |
| 2000-12-12 | Andrew Ross (25) | Unknown | Chicago, Illinois | |
| 2000-12-07 | Richard Lawrence Holtz (45) | Black | East Windsor, New Jersey | |
| 2000-12-04 | Daios Retzepis (22) | White | Temple City, California | |
| 2000-11-30 | Luther Edwards (35) | Unknown | Syracuse, New York | |
| 2000-11-18 | Mark Gault (36) | White | Santa Clarita, California | |
| 2000-11-10 | Guadalupe Gonzalez Morales (49) | Hispanic | Texas (Houston) | |
| 2000-11-05 | Paul C. Holcomb (53) | Unknown | Texas (Houston) | |
| 2000-11-05 | Carlos Garcia | Latino | Boston, Massachusetts | |
| 2000-11-03 | Ricky Alkana (37) | White | Monrovia, California | |
| 2000-11-03 | Juan Vega (56) | Latino | Chicago, Illinois | |
| 2000-11-02 | Janyce Cuccio (45) | White | Valley Cottage, New York | |
| 2000-11-01 | Alfred Charles Sanders (29) | Black | Minneapolis, Minnesota | Sanders was shot by police after a traffic stop. |
| 2000-10-28 | Anthony Dwain Lee (39) | Black | Los Angeles, California | Lee was shot by police while carrying a rubber toy gun at a Halloween party. |
| 2000-10-26 | unidentified man | Unknown | Milwaukee, Wisconsin | |
| 2000-10-26 | Christopher Easley (28) | Unknown | Lake Geneva, Wisconsin | |
| 2000-10-25 | Brandon Polk (18) | Black | Chicago, Illinois | |
| 2000-10-24 | Kenyon Penny (25) | Black | Los Angeles, California | After crashing with a parked car, Penny reportedly shot at officers after exiting. Penny was killed when the officers returned fire. |
| 2000-10-23 | Carmen Valentine (21) | Unknown | Brooklyn, New York | |
| 2000-10-23 | Naquan Supreme Perry (20) | Black | Union Township, New Jersey | |
| 2000-10-23 | Jimmy Ross Whitehead (70) | White | Texas (Houston) | |
| 2000-10-22 | Samuel Edwards (42) | Unknown | Chicago, Illinois | Edwards was hit and killed by a police car while riding a bike. |
| 2000-10-20 | Reynaldo Colon (33) | Unknown | Brooklyn, New York | |
| 2000-10-19 | Bruce Graham (67) | White | Cripple Creek, Colorado | Shot after pointing a rifle at police. Graham had started a fire in the police parking lot and was spraying fuel on the fire. |
| 2000-10-18 | Marsean Scott (19) | Unknown | Cleveland, Ohio | Police confronted a man with a gun after responding to a call of shots being fired. Marsean Scott exchanged gunfire with police and died. |
| 2000-10-04 | John Adams | Black | Lebanon, Tennessee | Shot after shooting at police. Officers raided wrong house in drug raid. Adams' wife thought they were victims of a home invasion and called for Adams to get his gun. |
| 2000-09-29 | Kevin Douglas Rue (25) | Unknown | Texas (Houston) | |
| 2000-09-24 | Elias Toscano (52) | Latino | Los Angeles, California | |
| 2000-09-23 | Wendall Wilcox (51) | Unknown | Orleans, Vermont | |
| 2000-09-21 | Edward Magana (32) | Latino | Whittier, California | |
| 2000-09-20 | Ismael Rodriguez (56) | Latino | Manhattan, New York | |
| 2000-09-20 | Anton Burrell (27) | Black | Inglewood, California | |
| 2000-09-18 | Ronald Terry (37) | Black | Chicago, Illinois | |
| 2000-09-15 | Sanchez, Daniel (22) | Latino | Los Angeles, California | Shot dead by three police officers after crashing into a light pole. Sanchez was unarmed. |
| 2000-08-31 | Curtis Allen Alexander (30) | White | Texas (Houston) | |
| 2000-08-29 | Errol Shaw Sr (39) | Black | Detroit, Michigan | Graduated from Michigan School for the Deaf in 1979; Shot by police on August 29 during an evening confrontation. Shaw, who was deaf and mute, did not see any police flash siren. The police approached him with a flashlight on his face, and unable to hear their commands, he perceived it as a mugging attempt. In self-defense, he protected himself with a rake, but the police acted swiftly, resulting in his death. Relatives and neighbors, including Shaw's niece Katina Crumpton, pleaded with the police not to shoot, emphasizing that Shaw couldn't hear. Witnesses claim that despite the warnings, police fired multiple shots. Shaw's mother, Annie Shaw, also shouted at the officers not to shoot her son, but their pleas were ignored. After the shooting, witnesses criticized the police for not taking immediate action to transport Shaw to the hospital, leaving him bleeding at the scene. Detectives reportedly appeared nonchalant, and some officers were seen laughing and joking. The incident has raised concerns about police response, especially in cases involving disabled individuals. |
| 2000-08-26 | Anthony Eady | Unknown | Los Angeles, California | |
| 2000-08-17 | James Britton (34) | Unknown | Chicago Heights, Illinois | |
| 2000-08-12 | Arthur Alalouf (47) | Unknown | Brooklyn, New York | |
| 2000-08-11 | Noe Lopez (33) | Hispanic | Texas (Houston) | |
| 2000-08-03 | Edward Moore (37) | Unknown | The Bronx, New York | |
| 2000-08-01 | Alfredo Cerna Palacios (37) | | California (Bakersfield) | Shot by a Bakersfield Police officer when, with a pair of scissors in his hand, he moved toward the two officers. He was within eight to twelve feet of the officers who were investigating a report of a man behaving strangely. |
| 2000-07-25 | Samuel Lucas (22) | Unknown | Chicago, Illinois | |
| 2000-07-20 | Kevin Morales (17) | Unknown | Chicago, Illinois | |
| 2000-07-07 | D'Andre Cisco (25) | Unknown | Queens, New York | |
| 2000-06-30 | Lisa Bymon (26) | | Georgia (Hinesville) | Stabbed to death, along with her two young children and her friend, by off-duty Ludowici Police Officer Calvin Williams. Williams was sentenced to four life sentences for the crimes. |
| 2000-06-30 | Desiree Bymon (7) | | Georgia (Hinesville) | Stabbed to death, along with her two young children and her friend, by off-duty Ludowici Police Officer Calvin Williams. Williams was sentenced to four life sentences for the crimes. |
| 2000-06-30 | Juwan Bymon (6) | | Georgia (Hinesville) | Stabbed to death, along with her two young children and her friend, by off-duty Ludowici Police Officer Calvin Williams. Williams was sentenced to four life sentences for the crimes. |
| 2000-06-30 | Ponda Davis (28) | | Georgia (Hinesville) | Stabbed to death, along with her two young children and her friend, by off-duty Ludowici Police Officer Calvin Williams. Williams was sentenced to four life sentences for the crimes. |
| 2000-06-20 | Daniel Austin (44) | Unknown | Chicago, Illinois | |
| 2000-06-18 | Robert Washington (17) | Black | Chicago, Illinois | |
| 2000-06-02 | Victoria Rivera (36) | Unknown | Texas (Houston) | |
| 2000-05-12 | William Brown (35) | | Connecticut (East Hartford) | |
| 2000-05-12 | Joseph Young (25) | | Connecticut (East Hartford) | |
| 2000-05-12 | Michael Taylor (20) | Black | Chicago, Illinois | |
| 2000-05-04 | Todd Dieterle (37) | Unknown | Santa Rosa, California | Dieterle robbed a convenience store with a plastic squirt gun that was painted to look realistic, and was shot at least seven times by Santa Rosa Police Department and Santa Rosa Junior College Police officers. |
| 2000-05-03 | Joseph Zagar (39) | Unknown | Chicago, Illinois | |
| 2000-05 | Robert Francisco Camacho (35) | Unknown | Rohnert Park, California | Camacho was shot in his trailer park 5 times by police after they came there to respond to a mental health crisis. Camacho had a firearm and was firing it in the trailer park before being shot by police. |
| 2000-04-26 | Randall Ramsey (17) | Black | Los Angeles, California | |
| 2000-04-23 | Richard Leon Keohane | Unknown | Texas (Houston) | |
| 2000-04-22 | James Murphy Jr (43) | Unknown | Queens, New York | |
| 2000-04-19 | Lanny Blaine Robinson (49) | White | Texas (Houston) | |
| 2000-04-12 | Malcolm Burnon (17) | Unknown | Brooklyn, New York | |
| 2000-04-10 | Erin McDonald (31) | Unknown | Windsor, California | McDonald was shot by police officers after she pointed a BB gun at them. Police came to her residence in response to a psychotic episode. |
| 2000-04-08 | Richard O'Bert (47) | Unknown | Pownal, Vermont | |
| 2000-03-31 | Tysheen Bourne (19) | Black | Brooklyn, New York | Shot to death, along with Andre Fields, by undercover NYPD narcotics detectives after the teenagers allegedly attempted to rob the officers with a toy pistol and a pellet gun wrapped in black tape. |
| 2000-03-31 | Andre Fields (17) | Black | Brooklyn, New York | Shot to death, along with Tysheen Bourne, by undercover NYPD narcotics detectives after the teenagers allegedly attempted to rob the officers with a toy pistol and a pellet gun wrapped in black tape. |
| 2000-03-31 | Felix Chagolla (26) | Latino | Los Angeles, California | Shot while threatening to explode a fake grenade. |
| 2000-03-22 | Edwin Diaz (24) | Unknown | Texas (Houston) | |
| 2000-03-16 | Arthur Hutchinson (40) | Black | Chicago, Illinois | |
| 2000-03-16 | Patrick Dorismond (26) | Black | New York (New York) | |
| 2000-03-05 | Jaime Santiago Cruz (23) | Hispanic | Texas (Houston) | |
| 2000-03-01 | Maliki Yawmi-Deen Raymond (24) | Black | New York City, New York | |
| 2000-02-15 | Howard Lee Love (29) | Unknown | Texas (Houston) | |
| 2000-02-05 | Donald Moore (37) | Unknown | Queens, New York | |
| 2000-02-02 | Edgar Ernesto Fregoso | Latino | Los Angeles, California | |
| 2000-02-29 | Eugene Guy (21) | Unknown | Chicago, Illinois | |
| 2000-01-28 | Cornel Young Jr. (29) | Black | Providence, Rhode Island | Young, an off-duty police officer, was killed by two fellow Providence police officers, when he tried to assist them during a violent arrest. The officers did not recognize Young in plainclothes and shot him after he refused to drop his weapon. Young had apparently not realized they were talking to him. The officers then realized they had shot a fellow police officer and transferred him to a hospital; Young was pronounced dead a short time later. His mother filed a civil rights suit against the city of Providence and against the police responsible for his shooting, but the suit was unsuccessful. The department posthumously promoted Young to the rank of sergeant. |
| 2000-01-17 | Alan Zelencic (28) | White | Queens, New York | |
| 2000-01-16 | Unnamed man (23) | | Oregon (Salem) | |
| 2000-01-16 | George Blair Reese (38) | | Pennsylvania (West Bradford) | |
| 2000-01-15 | Jose Daniel Gonzalez (25) | Hispanic | California (Tustin) | |
| 2000-01-14 | Unnamed man (40s) | Hispanic | California (Modesto) | |
| 2000-01-10 | Unnamed man | | Virginia (Abingdon) | |
| 2000-01-10 | Harold Greenwald (30s) | | Pennsylvania (Southwest Philadelphia) | |
| 2000-01-10 | Erin Forbes (26) | | Pennsylvania (Bala Cynwyd) | |
| 2000-01-06 | Unnamed man (36) | | Michigan (Eastpointe) | |
| 2000-01-06 | Darryl Woodall Jr. (23) | Black | North Carolina (Gastonia) | |
| 2000-01-06 | Kyle Dillon (19) | | Nebraska (York) | |
| 2000-01-05 | John Edward Pittman (45) | Black | Dothan, Alabama | Pittman allegedly tried to run down an officer after a car chase, resulting in the officer shooting Pittman three times, killing him. |

== See also ==
- Death in custody § United States
- Henry A. Wallace Police Crime Public Database
- List of cases of police brutality
- List of countries with annual rates and counts for killings by law enforcement officers
- List of law enforcement officers killed in the line of duty in the United States
- List of law enforcement officers convicted for an on-duty killing in the United States
- List of shootings by US immigration agents
- List of police reforms related to the George Floyd protests
- List of unarmed African Americans killed by law enforcement officers in the United States
- Lists of killings by law enforcement officers
- Police brutality in the United States
- Police misconduct § United States
- Police riot § United States
- Police use of deadly force in the United States
