= 1998 Rhode Island Attorney General election =

- November 3, 1998
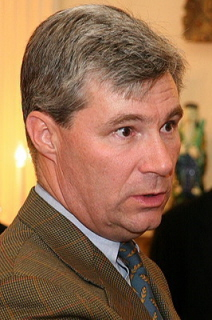

Nominee	Sheldon Whitehouse	Nancy Mayer
Party	Democratic	Republican
Popular vote	200,411	100,635
Percentage	66.57%	33.43%
- County results Whitehouse: 60–70%
Attorney General before election
Jeffrey B. Pine
Republican
Elected Attorney General
Sheldon Whitehouse
Democratic

The 1998 Rhode Island Attorney General election was held on November 3, 1998, to elect the Rhode Island Attorney General. Republican incumbent Jeffrey B. Pine was term-limited and ineligible to run for a third consecutive term. Primaries were held on September 15, 1998. Democratic attorney Sheldon Whitehouse won the election in a landslide, defeating Republican Rhode Island treasurer Nancy Mayer by a two-to-one margin.

== Republican primary ==
=== Candidates ===
- Nancy Mayer, Rhode Island treasurer (1993–1998)

=== Results ===
Republican primary results
Party	Candidate	Votes	%
Republican	Nancy Mayer	5,386	100.00%
Total votes		5,386	100.00%

== Democratic primary ==
=== Candidates ===
- William R. Guglietta
- Eva M. Mancuso, prosecutor
- Sheldon Whitehouse, United States Attorney for the District of Rhode Island (1993–1998)

=== Results ===
Democratic primary results
Party	Candidate	Votes	%
Democratic	Sheldon Whitehouse	36,530	49.34%
Democratic	Eva M. Mancuso	18,960	25.61%
Democratic	William R. Guglietta	18,549	25.05%
Total votes		74,039	100.00%

== General election ==
=== Candidates ===
- Sheldon Whitehouse, United States Attorney for the District of Rhode Island (1993–1998) (Democratic)
- Nancy Mayer, Rhode Island treasurer (1993–1998) (Republican)

=== Results ===
1998 Rhode Island Attorney General election results
Party	Candidate	Votes	%	±%
Democratic	Sheldon Whitehouse	200,411	66.57%	+44.62%
Republican	Nancy Mayer	100,635	33.43%	−42.56%
Total votes		301,046	100.00%	
Democratic gain from Republican				
