= Robert Flanders =

American attorney

Bob Flanders
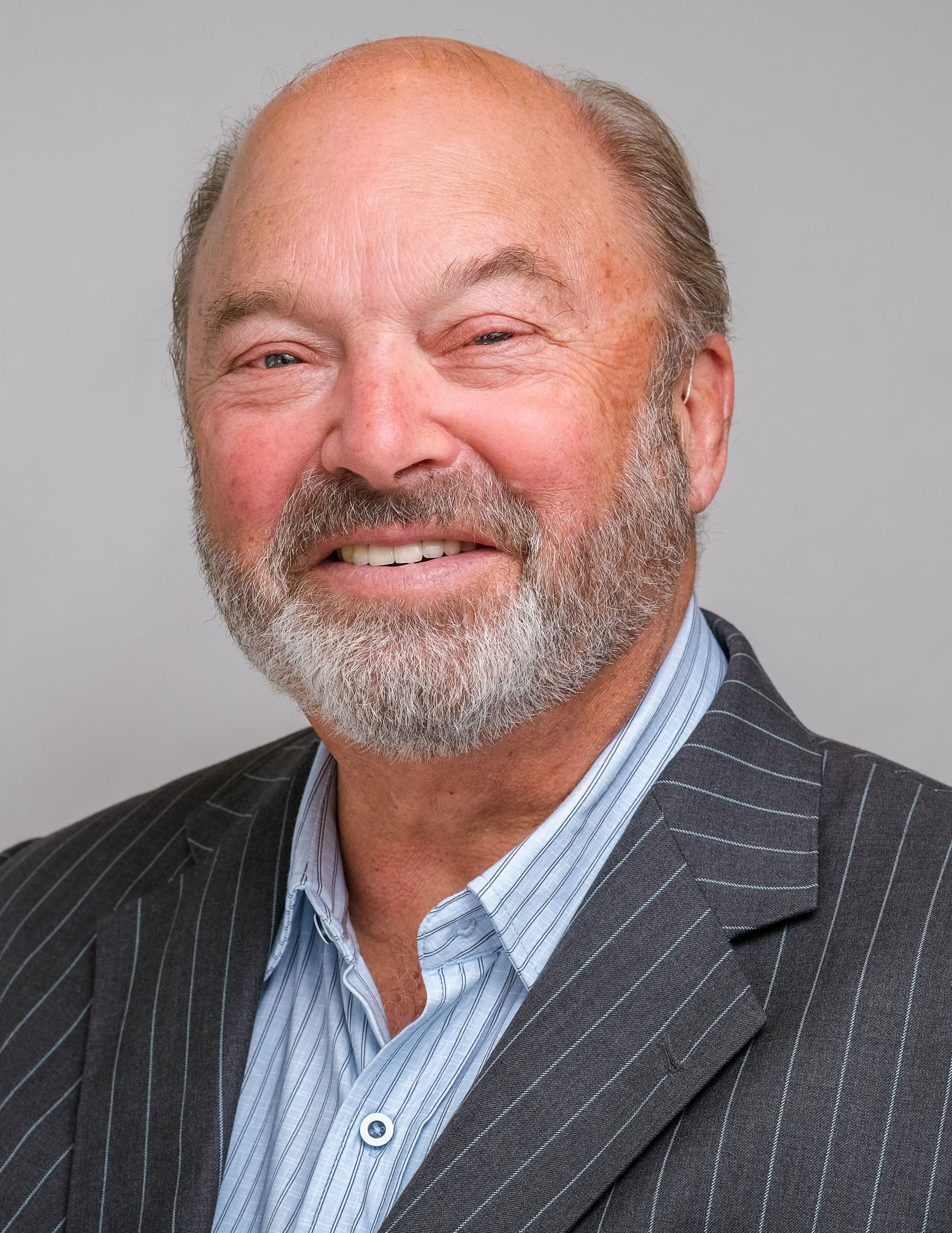

Associate Justice of the Rhode Island Supreme Court
- In office 1996–2004
- Succeeded by: William P. Robinson III

Personal details
- Born: Robert G. Flanders Jr. July 9, 1949 (age 76) North Massapequa, New York, U.S.
- Party: Republican
- Spouse: Ann Flanders
- Children: 3
- Education: Bachelor of Arts; Juris Doctor
- Alma mater: Brown University; Harvard University

Robert G. Flanders Jr. (born July 9, 1949) is an American attorney who is a partner at Whelan Corrente & Flanders. He is also the founder of Flanders and Medeiros.

Previously, Flanders served as an associate justice of the Rhode Island Supreme Court from 1996 to 2004.

== Early life and education ==
Flanders was born in 1949 in North Massapequa, Long Island, New York and grew up in a middle-class family. His father was a salesman while his mother worked in fast food restaurants. He received his early education from Chaminade High School in Mineola, New York.

For his college education, he went to Brown University and graduated magna cum laude in 1971 with a major in English. During his college years at Brown, he was elected to Phi Beta Kappa and received a prize for an essay he wrote on the classicism of Henry Fielding in Tom Jones.

As a law student at Harvard, Flanders played minor league baseball for the Detroit Tigers and served as an editor of the Harvard Law Record. He graduated from law school in 1974.

== Career ==
In 2004, after eight years of service as a justice of the Rhode Island Supreme Court, he resigned from the post and joined Hinckley, Allen & Snyder as a partner.

In 2011, Governor Lincoln Chafee appointed Flanders as the Central Falls Receiver, tasked with addressing the city's financial distress.

As an academic, Flanders has taught constitutional law and judicial process courses at the Roger Williams University Law School, as a distinguished visiting professor, and at Brown University, as an adjunct assistant professor of law and public policy.

== 2018 U.S. Senate campaign ==
Flanders won the Republican party nomination, defeating the only other candidate on the ballot, Rocky De La Fuente, a businessman who was seeking to get on the Senate ballot in several states in 2018.

As the Republican Party nominee, he participated in the 2018 election for US Senator from Rhode Island. He lost the election to Democratic incumbent, Sheldon Whitehouse.

== Personal life ==
Flanders grew up in a middle class household and is the oldest of seven children. He is a strong advocate of separation of powers.

He and his wife Ann live in East Greenwich, Rhode Island. They have three children.

== Bibliography ==
- Flanders, Jr., Robert G. (2005). Rhode Island Evidence Manual. LexisNexis.
- Flanders, Jr., Robert G.; Conley, Patrick (2007). The Rhode Island Constitution: A Reference Guide. Praeger.
- Flanders, Jr., Robert G.; Michaelis, Ron C.; Wulff, Paula H. (2008). A Litigator's Guide to DNA: From the Laboratory to the Courtroom. Academic Press.
- Flanders, Jr., Robert G. et al. (2017). A Practical Guide to Land Use Law in Rhode Island
- Flanders, Jr., Robert G. et al. (2022). Rhode Island Civil and Appellate Procedure with Commentaries. Thomson/Reuters.

Party political offices
Preceded by Barry Hinckley	Republican nominee for U.S. Senator from Rhode Island (Class 1); 2018	Succeeded by Patricia Morgan
