= Rand Tower Hotel =

Building in Minneapolis, Minnesota, United States

- U.S. National Register of Historic Places
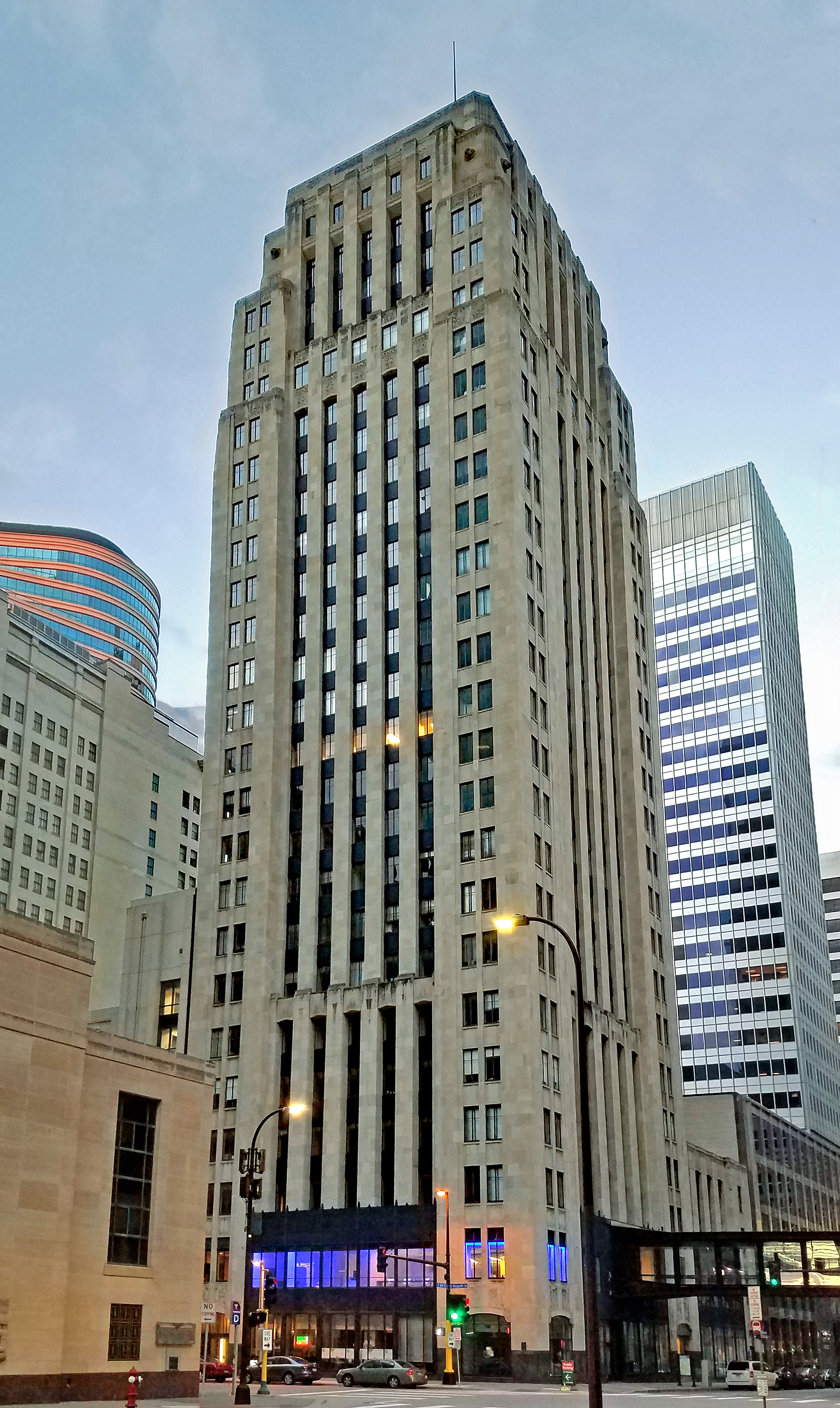
- Rand Tower Hotel from the west

- Location within Minnesota Location within the United States
- Location: 527 Marquette Avenue, Minneapolis, Minnesota
- Coordinates: 44°58′38.5″N 93°16′11″W
- Built: 1928
- Architect: Holabird & Root
- Architectural style: Art deco
- NRHP reference No.: 84003937
- Added to NRHP: April 14, 1994

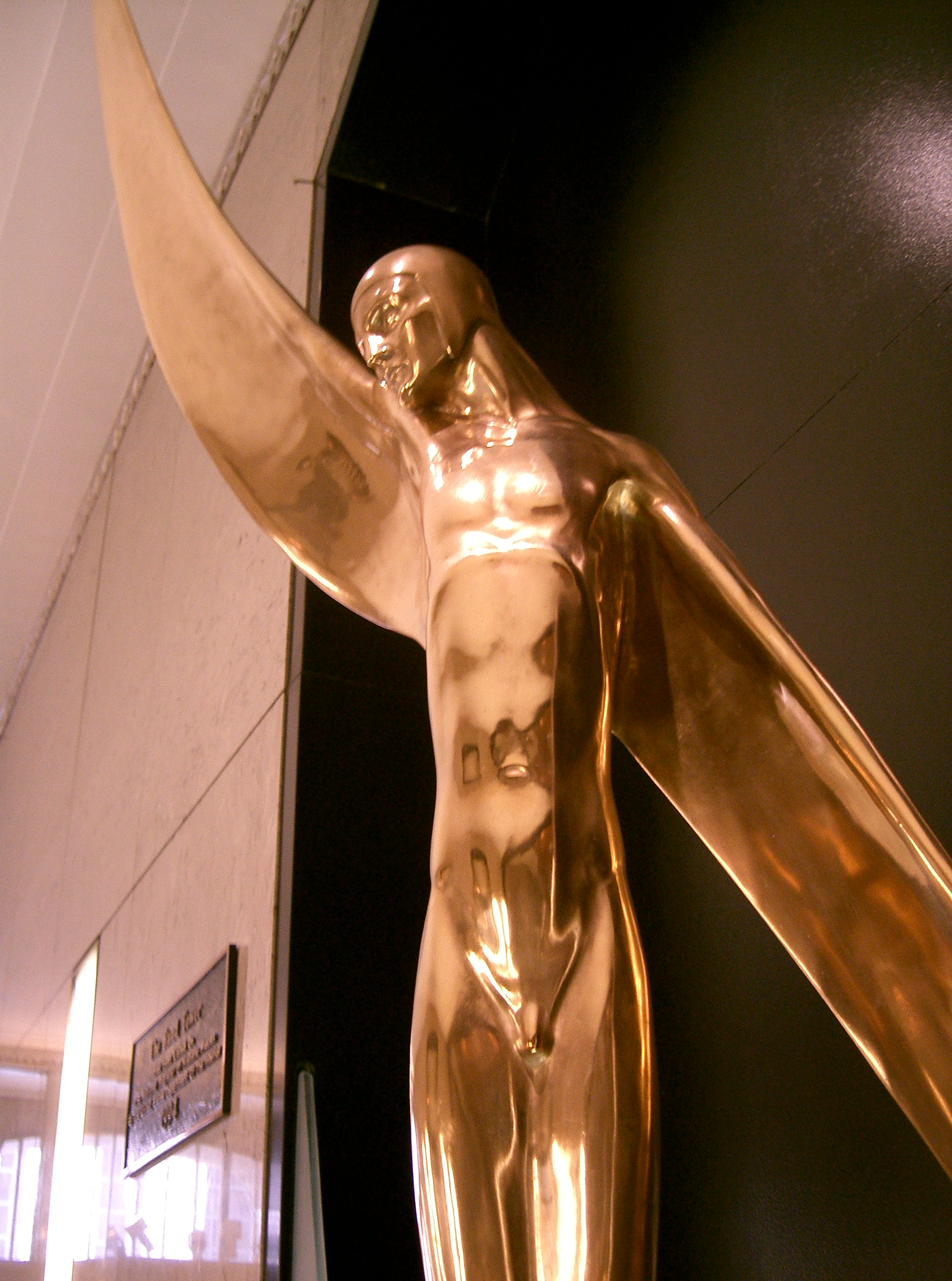
Wings Sculpture

Rand Tower Hotel is a 26-story high rise hotel in Minneapolis, Minnesota, United States. It was one of the city's tallest structures when it was completed as an office building in 1929. It was converted to a hotel in 2020.

== History ==
The Rand Tower Hotel was designed by Holabird & Root for Rufus Rand, a World War I aviator who was part of the family that owned the Minneapolis Gas Company (Minnegasco), now part of CenterPoint Energy. Rand had flown in the Lafayette Flying Corps during the war. Much of the building is covered in Art Deco ornamentation that follows an aviation theme and there is a sculpture Wings in the lobby by Oskar J. W. Hansen. The original builder was C.F. Haglin & Sons.

A skyway was attached to the building in 1969. Rand Tower was added to the National Register of Historic Places in 1994. It was known for a time as the Dain Tower until Dain Rauscher relocated to the Dain Rauscher Plaza just down the street in 1992. It was purchased by Gaughan Companies in 2004. In 2008, Hempel Properties purchased the Rand Tower to house its headquarters. Maven Real Estate Partners purchased the building in 2017 for $18.7 million. Maven converted the office building into a 270-room hotel, at a cost $110 million. The Rand Tower Hotel opened on December 2, 2020, as part of the Tribute Portfolio division of Marriott.

== See also ==
- List of tallest buildings in Minneapolis
