= 2018 United States Senate election in Rhode Island =

- November 6, 2018
- Turnout: 47.69%
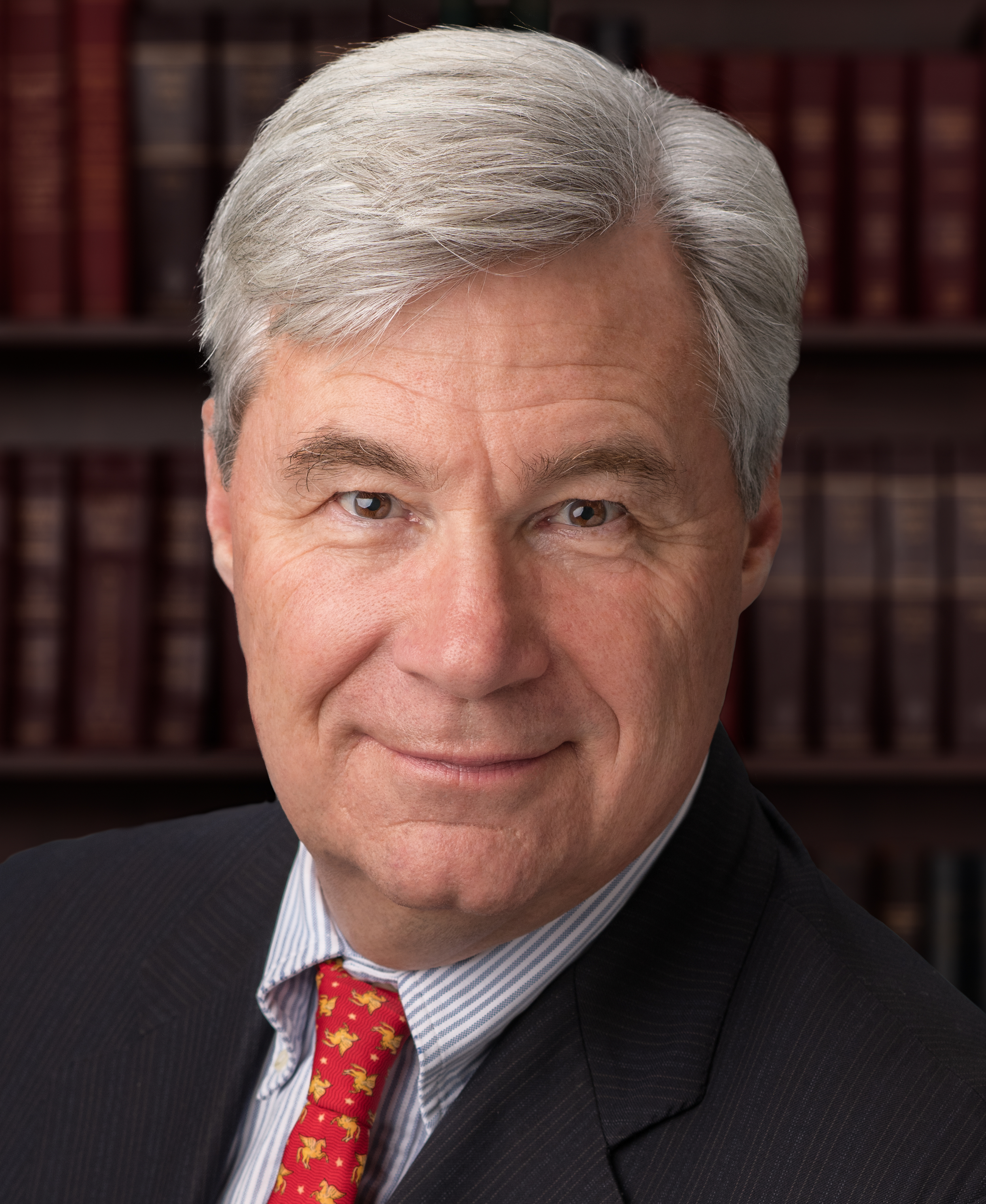

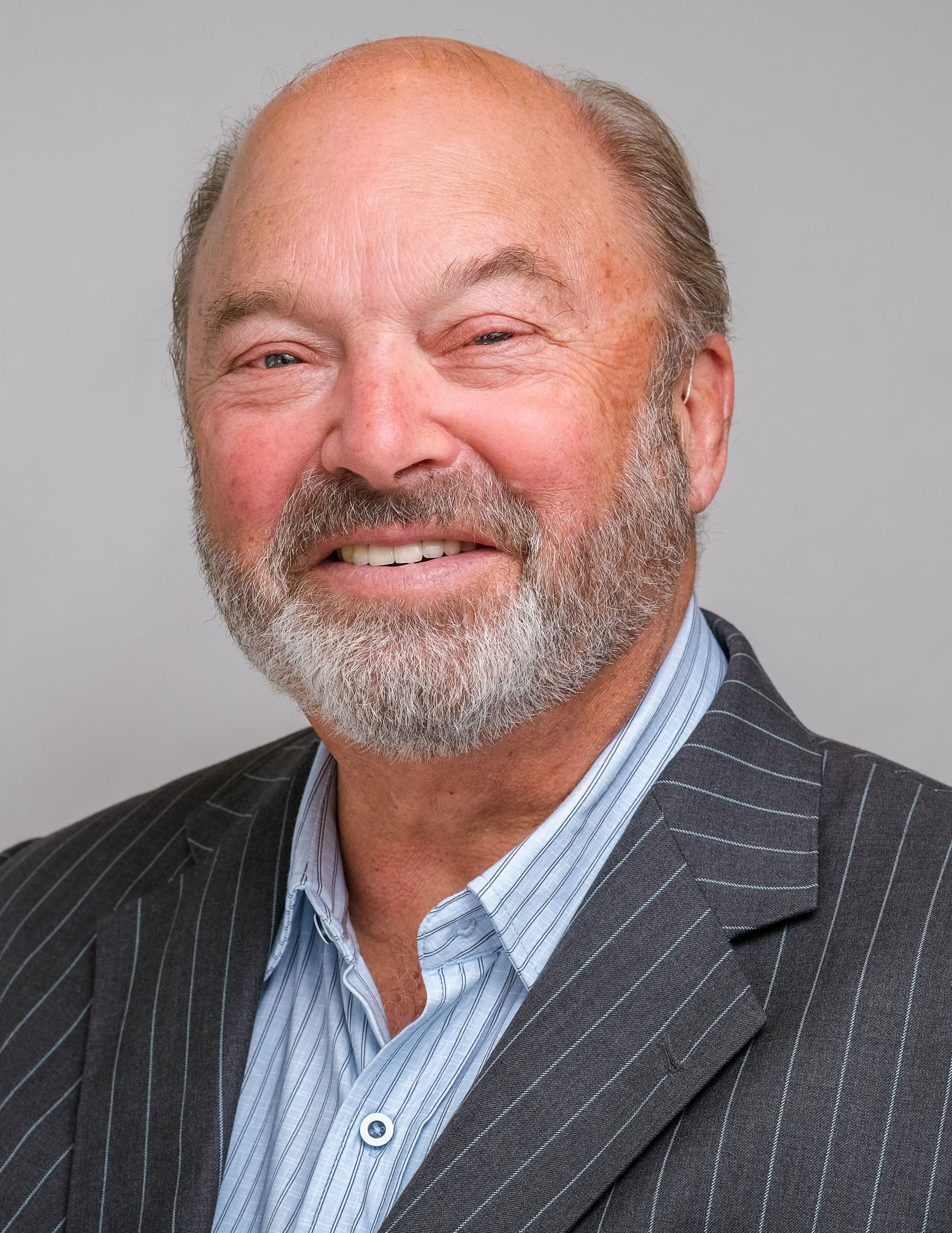
Nominee	Sheldon Whitehouse	Robert Flanders
Party	Democratic	Republican
Popular vote	231,477	144,421
Percentage	61.44%	38.33%
- Whitehouse: 50–60% 60–70% 70–80% 80–90% >90% Flanders: 40–50% 50–60% 60–70% Tie: 40–50% No votes
U.S. senator before election
Sheldon Whitehouse
Democratic
Elected U.S. Senator
Sheldon Whitehouse
Democratic

The 2018 United States Senate election in Rhode Island took place on November 6, 2018, in order to elect a member of the United States Senate to represent the state of Rhode Island. Incumbent Democrat Sheldon Whitehouse was reelected to a third term, defeating Republican Robert Flanders by a margin of twenty-three percent.

== Democratic primary ==
=== Candidates ===
==== Nominated ====
- Sheldon Whitehouse, incumbent senator

==== Eliminated in primary ====
- Patty Joy Fontes, progressive activist

==== Declined ====
- Lincoln Chafee, former governor of Rhode Island and former U.S. senator

=== Polling ===
Hypothetical polling

Poll source	Date(s) administered	Sample size	Margin of error	Sheldon Whitehouse	Lincoln Chafee	Undecided
ALG Research (D-Whitehouse)	May 7–14, 2018	329	± 5.5%	72%	14%	14%

=== Results ===
Results by county: Whitehouse: 70–80%; 80–90%

Democratic primary results
Party	Candidate	Votes	%
Democratic	Sheldon Whitehouse (incumbent)	89,140	76.79%
Democratic	Patricia J. Fontes	26,947	23.21%
Total votes		116,087	100.00%

== Republican primary ==
=== Candidates ===
==== Nominated ====
- Robert Flanders, former Associate Justice of the Rhode Island Supreme Court

==== Eliminated in primary ====
- Rocky De La Fuente, businessman and perennial candidate

==== Withdrew ====
- Robert Nardolillo, state representative

=== Endorsements ===
Robert Flanders

Organizations

- Rhode Island Coalition for Israel

=== Results ===
Results by county: Flanders: 80–90%

Republican primary results
Party	Candidate	Votes	%
Republican	Robert G. Flanders Jr.	26,543	87.70%
Republican	Roque "Rocky" De La Fuente	3,722	12.30%
Total votes		30,265	100.00%

== General election ==
=== Debates ===
- Complete video of debate, October 9, 2018

=== Predictions ===
Source	Ranking	As of
The Cook Political Report	Safe D	October 26, 2018
Inside Elections	Safe D	November 1, 2018
Sabato's Crystal Ball	Safe D	November 5, 2018
Fox News	Likely D	July 9, 2018
CNN	Safe D	July 12, 2018
RealClearPolitics	Safe D	June 2018

=== Polling ===
Poll source	Date(s) administered	Sample size	Margin of error	Sheldon Whitehouse (D)	Robert Flanders (R)	Other	Undecided
Fleming & Associates	October 20–24, 2018	416	± 4.8%	55%	36%	–	7%
SocialSphere	October 5–9, 2018	502	–	56%	32%	–	12%
University of New Hampshire	September 27 – October 6, 2018	503	± 4.4%	57%	33%	3%	6%
Fleming & Associates	September 14–17, 2018	420	± 4.8%	54%	35%	–	10%
SocialSphere	May 30 – June 4, 2018	501	–	54%	32%	–	14%

Hypothetical polling

with Robert Nardolillo

Poll source	Date(s) administered	Sample size	Margin of error	Sheldon Whitehouse (D)	Robert Nardolillo (R)	Undecided
SocialSphere	May 30 – June 4, 2018	501	–	53%	31%	16%

=== Results ===

United States Senate election in Rhode Island, 2018
Party	Candidate	Votes	%	±%
Democratic	Sheldon Whitehouse (incumbent)	231,477	61.44%	−3.37%
Republican	Robert Flanders	144,421	38.33%	+3.36%
Write-in		840	0.22%	N/A
Total votes		376,738	100.00%	N/A
Democratic hold				

==== By county ====
	Sheldon Whitehouse Democratic		Robert Flanders Republican		Others	
County	Votes	%	Votes	%	Votes	%
Bristol	13,441	63.3%	7,757	36.5%	48	0.2%
Kent	36,704	54.3%	30,749	45.5%	145	0.2%
Newport	21,453	63.6%	12,228	36.2%	61	0.2%
Providence	126,669	64.1%	70,495	35.7%	476	0.2%
Washington	33,071	58.7%	23,189	41.1%	110	0.2%

==== By congressional district ====
Whitehouse won both congressional districts.

District	Whitehouse	Flanders	Representative
1st	66%	34%	David Cicilline
2nd	57%	42%	James Langevin
