= Raymond Lassor =

American serial killer

- Born: Raymond J. Lassor; 1963 (age 62–63); Westerly, Rhode Island, U.S.
- Convictions: First degree murder (3 counts); Attempted murder First degree sexual assault
- Penalty: Life imprisonment without parole

Details
- Victims: 3
- Span of crimes: June – August 1984
- Country: United States
- State: Rhode Island
- Date apprehended: September 18, 1984

Raymond J. Lassor (born 1963) is an American serial killer who strangled to death three women, and attempted to murder a fourth, in the span of just over two months in 1984. He later became the first criminal to be successfully prosecuted under the newly enacted Rhode Island "Life Without Parole Statute", headed by prosecutor Jeffrey B. Pine, and promptly received life imprisonment without parole for his crimes.

== Murders ==
In the summer of 1984, three women were killed in a remarkably similar fashion in Providence's downtown area: all were found within a five-block radius, near a bus depot, were strangled to death and left only partially clothed. The first murder occurred on June 26, with the victim being 22-year-old prostitute Lori Carlucci, whose body was found in a vacant parking lot. Weeks later, on August 17, the body of 18-year-old aspiring model-gospel singer Wanda Sue Adams, of Columbia, South Carolina, was found floating in the Woonasquatucket River. Adams had been visiting relatives in Providence at the time of her murder. The final killing occurred on August 30, when the body of 58-year-old transient Delores Neuser was found battered in a parking garage. The murders raised fears of a serial killer in Providence, and local police formed a special group to catch the perpetrator as fast as possible.

== Arrest, trial and imprisonment ==
On September 18, a 14-year-old Pawtucket girl named Carrie-Ann Talbot was found beaten and sexually assaulted in Roger Williams Park. She had heel marks on her left eye, resulting from her attacker stomping on her face, in which she had lost sight. Despite her severe injuries, she survived, and Talbot managed to tell what had transpired the previous day - she had been introduced to her would-be killer by an acquaintance, and claimed that "Ray" was a pimp who frequented the downtown bus station. After smoking some marijuana together in the park, she was suddenly attacked by her companion, who left her for dead, thinking she wouldn't survive the ordeal. When shown photographs of several suspects, both Talbot and her friend identified the supposed hustler - he was 23-year-old Raymond Lassor, an unemployed drifter and male prostitute who frequented the area.

That same day, Lassor was arrested, and during the subsequent police interviews, he signed four full confessions for the three murders and the rape of Talbot, with details of the crime scenes that only the actual perpetrator could know. He also faced an assault charge against a woman in his hometown of Westerly, but that charge was later dropped. In his trial, which lasted two years, Lassor's court-appointed attorney Russell M. Sollitto tried to discredit Talbot's testimony by arguing that she had blacked out during the attack, in addition to claiming that the authorities had coerced his client into writing the confessions. Despite his attempts, the Superior Court found Lassor guilty on all charges, as the witness testimony matched with the physical evidence left behind by the perpetrator, and as described by prosecutor Jeffrey B. Pine, "[Lassor's] fingerprint is on every crime in the case. It jumps out at you. Each one bears his mark." Receiving multiple life sentences without parole, Lassor became the first prisoner to be successfully prosecuted under the newly enacted "Life Without Parole Statute" in the state of Rhode Island.

== See also ==
- List of serial killers in the United States
