= United States Senate Environment and Public Works Subcommittee on Oversight =

U.S. Senate subcommittee

The U.S. Senate Environment and Public Works Subcommittee on Oversight is a subcommittee of the U.S. Senate Committee on Environment and Public Works.

== Jurisdiction ==
According to the Committee's website:

Responsibility for oversight of agencies, departments, and programs within the jurisdiction of the full committee, and for conducting investigations within such jurisdiction

== Members, 116th Congress ==
Majority	Minority
John Barrasso, Wyoming, Chairman; James Inhofe, Oklahoma; Shelley Moore Capito, West Virginia; Kevin Cramer, North Dakota; Michael Braun, Indiana; John Boozman, Arkansas; Michael Rounds, South Dakota; Daniel Sullivan, Alaska; Roger Wicker, Mississippi; Richard Shelby, Alabama; Joni Ernst, Iowa	Thomas Carper, Delaware Ranking Member; Benjamin Cardin, Maryland; Jeff Merkley, Oregon; Sheldon Whitehouse, Rhode Island; Bernard Sanders, Vermont; Kirsten Gillibrand, New York; Cory Booker, New Jersey; Edward Markey, Massachusetts; Tammy Duckworth, Illinois; Christopher Van Hollen, Maryland
