= William P. Robinson III =

American judge (born 1940)

Bill Robinson

Associate Justice of the Rhode Island Supreme Court
- Incumbent
- Assumed office September 7, 2004
- Appointed by: Donald Carcieri
- Preceded by: Robert Flanders

Personal details
- Born: William Philip Robinson III; January 30, 1940 (age 85); Providence, Rhode Island, U.S.
- Spouse: Marlene
- Children: 3
- Education: Université catholique de Louvain (BA); University of Rhode Island (MA); University of Connecticut (PhD); Boston College (JD)

William Philip Robinson III (January 30, 1940) is an American lawyer, academic, and jurist serving as an associate justice of the Rhode Island Supreme Court.

== Early life and education ==
Born on January 30, 1940, Robinson grew up in East Providence, Rhode Island and graduated from La Salle Academy in Providence. He received his undergraduate degree from Université catholique de Louvain in Belgium. While studying in Europe, he worked for three summers at an orphanage in the Pyrenees.

Robinson earned a master's degree in French literature from the University of Rhode Island and a Ph.D. in French and Spanish literature from the University of Connecticut, where he taught literature. He also administered the University of Connecticut's foreign study program in France.

In 1975, he graduated with honors from Boston College Law School.

== Career ==
During law school, Robinson worked as a law clerk with the United States Court of Appeals for the First Circuit in Boston. He has remained active at Boston College Law serving as a moot-court judge and working with the alumni association.

After his clerkship, Robinson joined the firm of Edwards & Angell in Providence, Rhode Island. He worked in the litigation department for 27 years, specializing in the First Amendment and the defense of media clients. Robinson served as chairman of the Federal Board of Bar Examiners for Rhode Island.

Robinson was elected to the East Greenwich school committee in Rhode Island and served from 1988 to 1996. He was later named to Rhode Island Board of Governors for Higher Education which he served on from 2000 to 2003. Republican Governor Donald Carcieri nominated him to the Rhode Island Supreme Court. He was unanimously confirmed in July 2004 by the General Assembly.

=== Rhode Island Supreme Court ===
In 2018, Justice Robinson dissented from the majority in a widely reported common law marriage case. The Providence Journal wrote six stories about the case from 2016 to 2018. The Superior court had ruled that Angela Luis and Kevin Gaugler, who had lived together for more than 20 years, were married in common law. The Supreme Court overturned the decision.

Justice Robinson wrote: "It is my definite view that the trial justice’s finding fact and her determinations about credibility do very clearly and much more than sufficiently constitute a basis for her ultimate holding that there was clear and convincing evidence of a common law marriage…” “She [the trial justice] examined the record as a whole," Robinson wrote.

He dissented in 2017 in a pension case involving former Providence Mayor Buddy Cianci's top administrator who had been convicted on six felonies in the Operation Plunder Dome scandal. The majority had overturned a decision of the city's pension board to reduce the administrator's pension. "In my judgment," Justice Robinson wrote, “this Court should be extremely wary about closing to any extent the door which has been traditionally wide open— viz., the door to Equity.”

After 20 years in the courts, the Supreme Court granted Cianci's former director of administration a partial pension of $1,842.61 a month.

In 2007, in a freedom on the press case, Robinson wrote the majority opinion in a libel suit filed against the New Bedford Standard Times by a man who allegedly left the scene of a fatal accident. The newspaper had relied on a police report for its story and cited its fair-report privilege in its motion for summary judgment.

==== Controversy ====
While in private practice, Robinson represented the St. George's School in 1989 against allegations of condoning a culture of rape. In the case, Anne Scott described having been serially raped at age 15 by a 67-year-old school trainer, Al Gibbs. While not known publicly at that time, four other students had complained to the school about being raped by that same trainer. The school attacked the allegations, by—for example—insisting that the former student be forced to publicly reveal her identity. Robinson directed this legal defense. As he wrote as part of the 1989 legal case, "Maybe people will come forward and say the plaintiff is a, with all due respect to those in the court, has a tendency to lie, and that would be relevant, also." As part of his defense of the school, Robinson also argued that if the two did have sex, that it was consensual. While making that case, Robinson was chastised by U.S. Magistrate Jacob Hagopian, who denied the school's motion to dismiss, saying that the teenager could not consent to such "detestable" acts. "It violates the criminal laws of the United States," he said, "or of any state of this Union, or of any civilized country, where the element of it being volitional or non-volitional, or voluntary or non-voluntary, has anything to do with this type of detestable allegation made by a person who is not of age of consent, can you explain that to me?" When Robinson tried to explain, Hagopian cut him off, stating, "It’s impossible. It violates the criminal laws of the United States."

While that 1989 case has long been dropped, an investigation by St. George's own attorneys in 2015 concluded that the allegations of rape were true. Further, a total of at least 26 students were assaulted by at least 6 members of the St. George's faculty and staff

In 2016, in reaction to criticism, Robinson defended himself: "In the 1980s, while engaged in the private practice of law, I represented St. George's School in certain litigation in the federal court which has recently become the subject of interest in the media. I represented the client as an attorney must, zealously, ethically and to the best of my ability. I do not believe that further comment is necessary or appropriate.
