= Rand House =

Historic house in Minnesota, United States

- Rufus Rand Summer House and Carriage Barn
- U.S. National Register of Historic Places
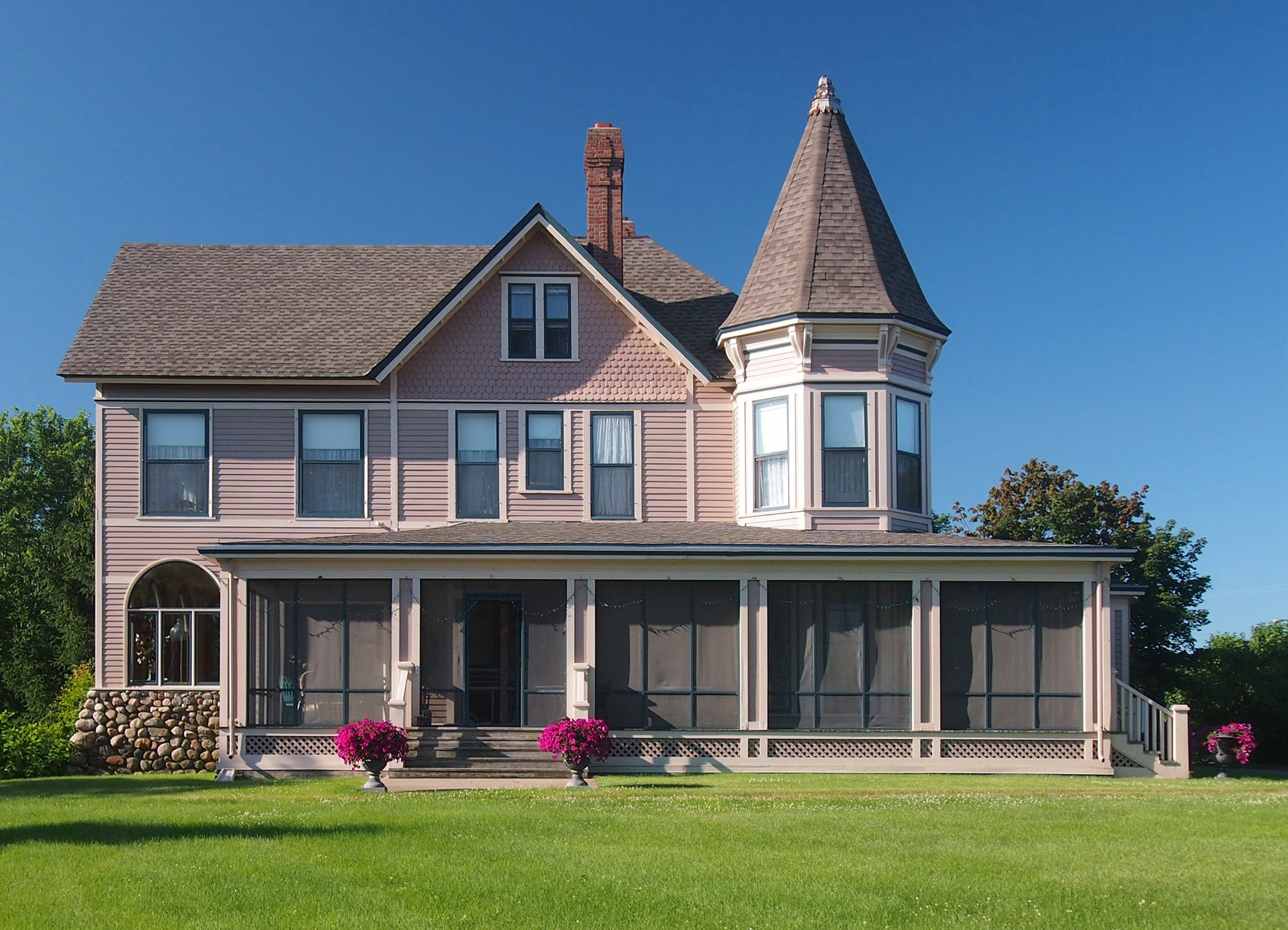
- The Rand House from the northeast

- Location within Minnesota Location within the United States
- Location: 1 Old Territorial Road, Monticello, Minnesota
- Coordinates: 45°17′53.7″N 93°47′7.7″W
- Area: 3 acres (1.2 ha)
- Built: 1884
- Architect: Susan Mealey
- Architectural style: Queen Anne
- MPS: Wright County MRA
- NRHP reference No.: 79001275
- Designated NRHP: December 11, 1979

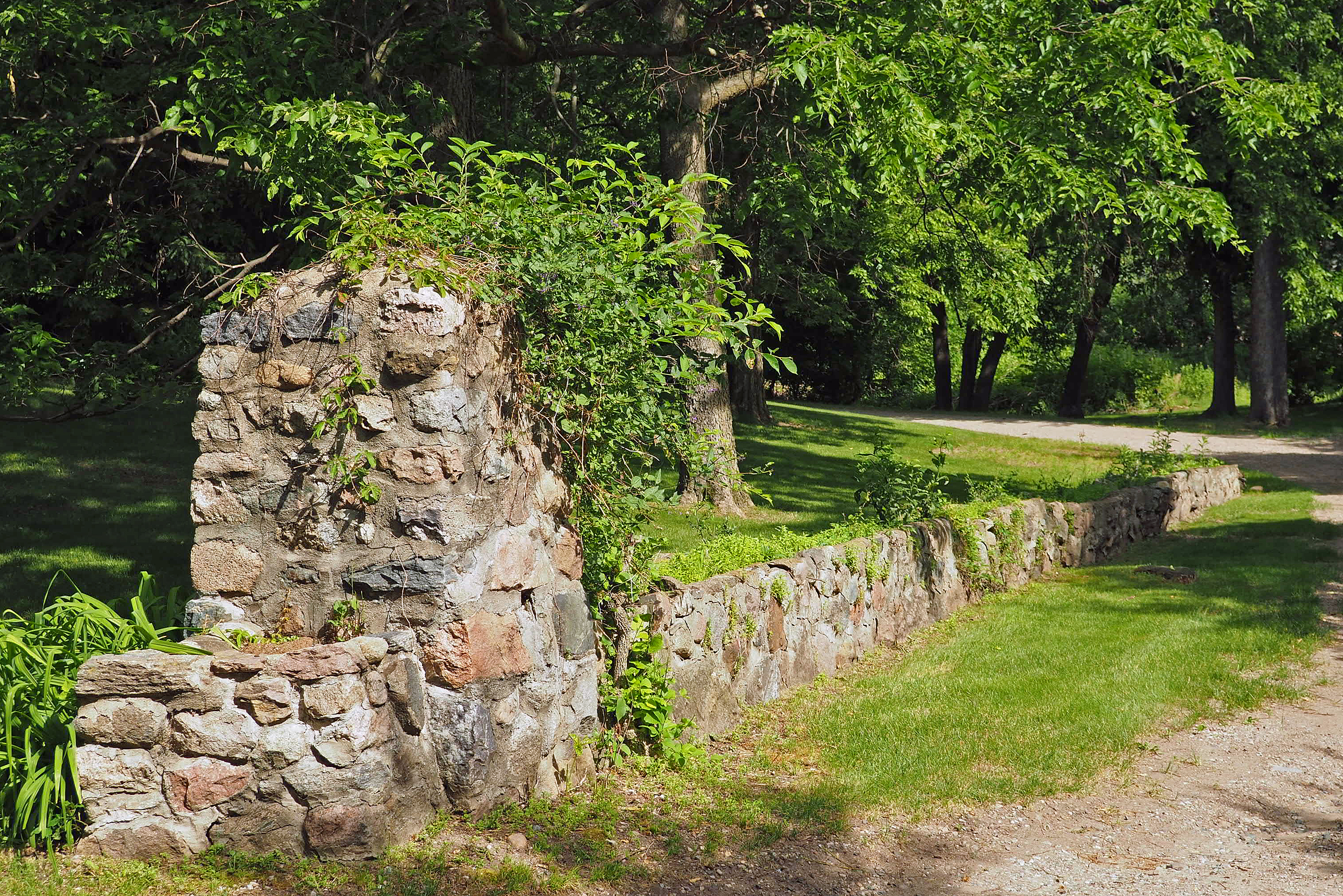
Part of the surviving garden wall

The Rand House, nicknamed "Random", is a historic house in Monticello, Minnesota, United States, constructed in 1884 and operated as a bed and breakfast from the mid-1990s until 2020. The house is now a private residence. It was the centerpiece of a summer estate owned by Minneapolis businessman Rufus Rand, Sr., and his wife Susan Mealey. The Rand House and a nearby building were listed on the National Register of Historic Places in 1979 as the Rufus Rand Summer House and Carriage Barn for having local significance in the themes of architecture, commerce, and entertainment/recreation. They were nominated for being representative of the late-19th-century country estates built by Twin Cities businessmen, their Queen Anne architecture, and association with Rand, a prominent utility executive.

== Description ==
The Rand House is a 2 1/2-story wood-frame building with 30 rooms. It stands on a hill southeast of downtown Monticello. Queen Anne architectural features include a polygonal corner tower, wraparound porches, patterned shingles on the gables, irregular plan, and multi-gabled roof. Built as a summer home, the house had open porches and large windows. Exterior window shutters were affixed to help seal the house up over the winter.

The carriage barn is a 1 1/2-story frame building south of the main house. In 1952 it was converted to a single-family home under separate ownership.

The estate grounds once featured an arboretum, swimming pool, windmill, and flower gardens, all ringed by a lilac hedge. Only traces of the gardens and walls remain.

== History ==
Rufus Rand was the vice-president of the Minneapolis Gas Light Company in 1884 when he married Susan Mealey, daughter of state senator Tobias Mealey. As a gift the bride's parents gave a prominent hilltop property near their own house on the outskirts of Monticello, and Rand invited his new wife to design a summer home for them as her wedding gift. As railway connections to the countryside around Minneapolis–Saint Paul emerged, it had become common for wealthy businessmen from the cities to construct rural estates for summer getaways.

Rand ultimately became president of the Gas Light Company and died in 1921. The house remained in the Rand family for over 60 years. During World War II the U.S. Army Air Corps was training glider pilots in Monticello, and the Rand family loaned them the property for officers' quarters. The house was later converted for use as a nursing home, then a funeral home. In 1986 it was acquired by Duffy and Merrill Busch, who renovated the property and began operating it as a bed and breakfast.

== See also ==
- National Register of Historic Places listings in Wright County, Minnesota
