= Jeffrey B. Pine =

American lawyer

Jeffrey B. Pine (born January 10, 1955) is an American attorney. He served as Attorney General of Rhode Island from 1993-1999. Since 1999 he has been in private practice as a trial lawyer in both criminal and civil litigation.

Pine spent ten years as a criminal prosecutor in the Rhode Island Department of the Attorney General, prosecuting dozens of capital cases and high-profile homicides. Following the enactment of Rhode Island's Life Without Parole Statute in 1984, he was the first prosecutor to prosecute a life-without-parole case, in Rhode Island v. Raymond Lassor (1986); Lassor was convicted of three homicides and sentenced to life without parole.

Pine was elected Attorney General in 1992 and was reelected in 1994, receiving 76% of the vote.

As Attorney General, Pine established priorities for the Department in the areas of juvenile crime, consumer protection, domestic violence, senior protection, public corruption, health care, and multi-state public interest litigation. He oversaw the prosecutions of the Chief Justice of the Rhode Island Supreme Court, Thomas Fay, for ethics violations; of Rhode Island's former governor Edward DiPrete for bribery; of four-time serial killer Craig Price; of banking-crisis figure Joseph Mollicone; and of notorious killer Christopher Hightower.

During his two terms as Attorney General, the Department was awarded "The 1997 Elder Initiative Award" presented by the National Association of Attorneys General, recognizing the Department's achievements in protecting senior citizens.

Pine also was a member of the Executive Committee of the National Association of Attorneys General and served as Chair of the Eastern Region for two years.

In 1993, Pine established statewide task forces to prevent violence in schools and domestic violence. He also chaired a task force to prevent the sexual and violent abuse of children, which aimed to improve the justice system's treatment of victims of child abuse and sexual assault.

Following his departure from the Attorney General's office, Pine entered private practice, concentrating in criminal and civil litigation.

Pine has won acquittals in jury trials numerous times, for clients charged with murder and other capital felonies.

He has also appeared on CNN, The Today Show, Dateline, and local news outlets as a commentator on legal cases.

Party political offices
Preceded by Bradford Gorham	Republican nominee for Attorney General of Rhode Island; 1992, 1994	Succeeded by Nancy Mayer
