= Monticello, Minnesota =

City in Minnesota, United States

Monticello
- City
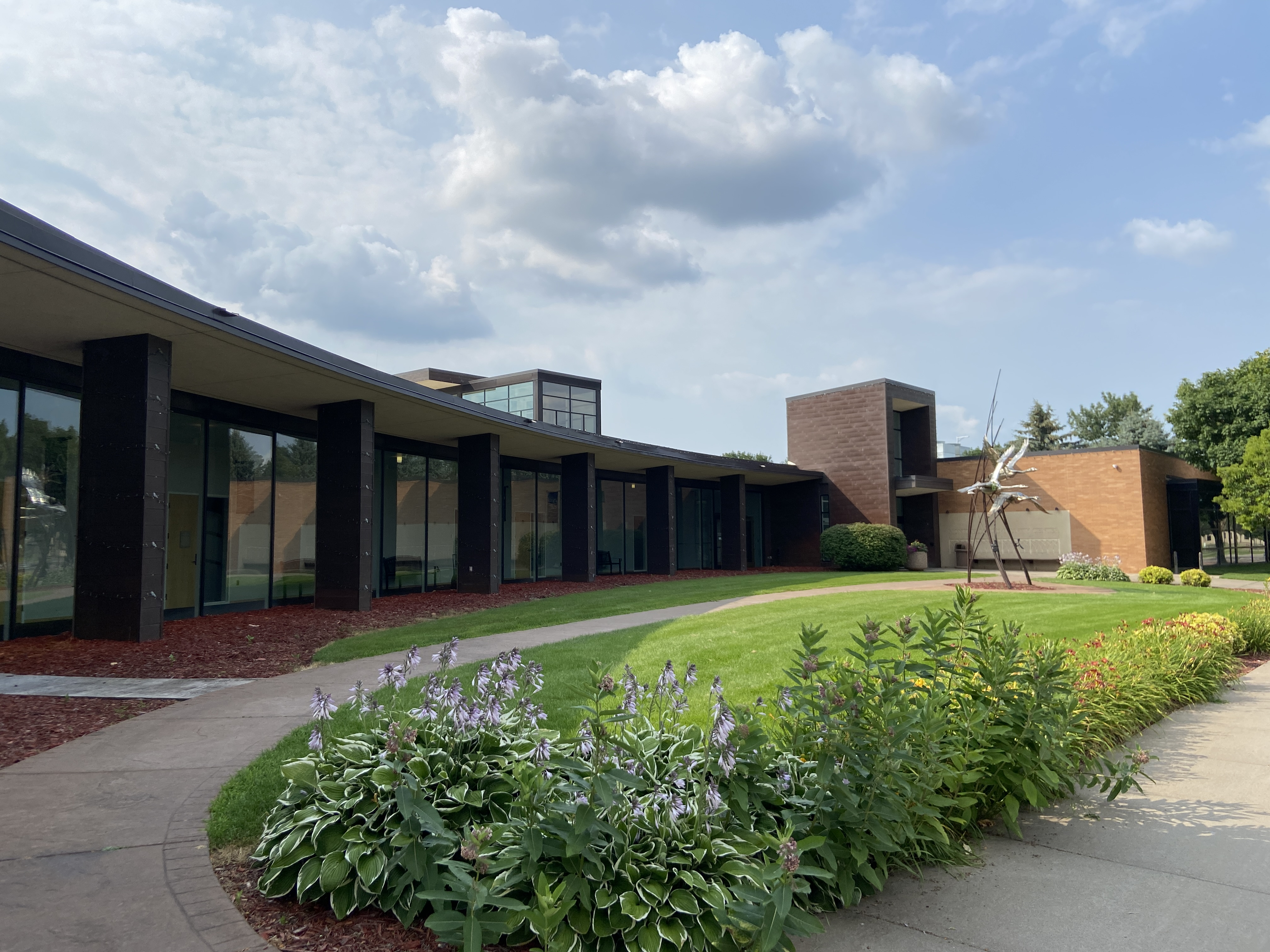
- Monticello City Hall/Community Center

- Location of the city of Monticello within Wright County, Minnesota
- Coordinates: 45°18′2″N 93°47′48″W
- Country: United States
- State: Minnesota
- County: Wright
- Settled: 1852
- Platted: 1854
- Founded: March 1, 1856
- Incorporated (village): March 9, 1875
- Incorporated (city): April 30, 1906

Government
  - Mayor: Lloyd Hilgart

Area
  - Total: 9.33 sq mi (24.17 km^{2})
  - Land: 9.00 sq mi (23.32 km^{2})
  - Water: 0.33 sq mi (0.86 km^{2})
- Elevation: 928 ft (283 m)

Population (2020)
  - Total: 14,455
  - Estimate (2022): 14,804
  - Density: 1,605.7/sq mi (619.97/km^{2})
- Time zone: UTC–6 (Central (CST))
  - Summer (DST): UTC–5 (CDT)
- ZIP code: 55362
- Area code: 763
- FIPS code: 27-43774
- GNIS feature ID: 0648048
- Sales tax: 7.375%
- Website: www.monticellomn.gov

Monticello (/ˌmɒntɪˈsɛloʊ/ MON-tiss-EL-oh) is a city next to the Mississippi River in Wright County, Minnesota, United States. The population was 14,455 at the 2020 census.

== Geography ==
According to the United States Census Bureau, the city has a total area of 8.94 square miles (23.15 km^{2}), all land. The city's latitude is 45.305 degrees North and its longitude is 93.793 degrees West. Its elevation is 922 feet. Monticello is in the Central time zone.

=== Parks ===
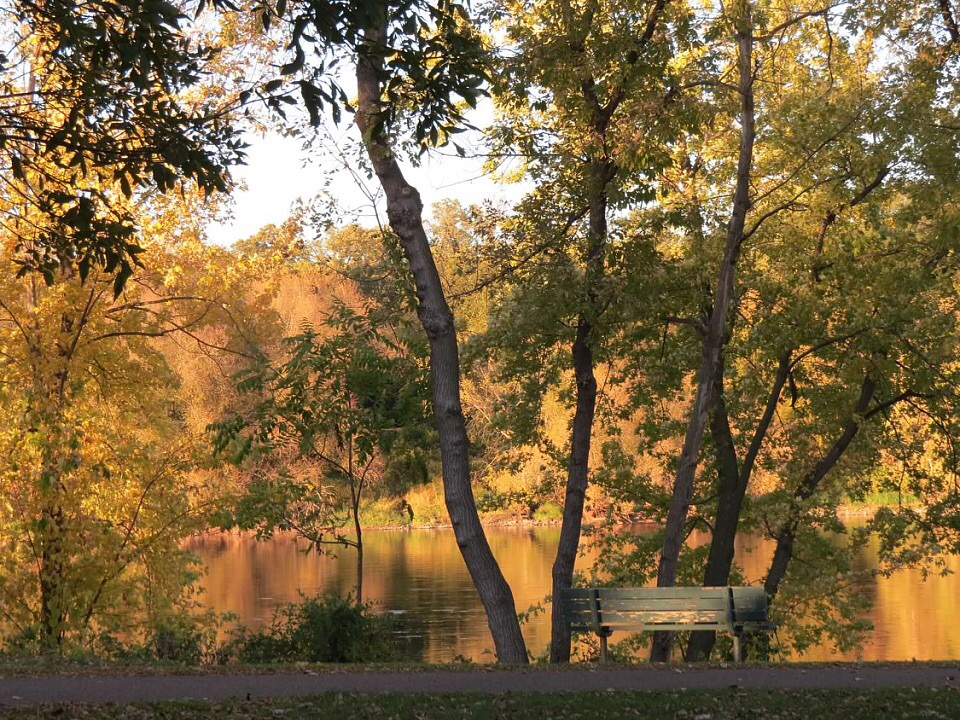
The Mississippi River at Ellison Park in Monticello

Monticello has an extensive parks and pathway system, including 28 city-owned parks and miles of winding trails. Lake Maria State Park, Montissippi Regional Park and the Harry Larsen Memorial Park are three of the largest. At Swan Park, each winter between December and March, as many as 2,700 trumpeter swans nest near Mississippi Drive in Monticello, as the Mississippi River is heated from warm water discharged by the Monticello Nuclear Generating Plant.

The City of Monticello and Wright County partnered and acquired 1,200 acres of open space in Wright County, known as the Bertram Chain of Lakes. The Bertram Chain includes four lakes and acres of undisturbed shoreline, natural habitat, and oak forest, 812 of which are open for public enjoyment. It provides users access to 4 miles of hiking trails, 10 miles of single-track mountain biking trails, beach at Bertram Lake for swimming, and carry-in access to Long Lake, which allow the opportunity to paddle Long, Mud and First Lakes. Winter activities include fat-biking, snowshoeing, and cross-country skiing. Summer activities include paddleboard classes, canoeing excursions, kids fishing programs, and guided moonlight hiking.

== History ==
Monticello was platted in 1854. A post office has been in operation at Monticello since 1855. Monticello was incorporated in 1856. The nearby village of Moritzious merged with Monticello in 1891.

In 1971, the Monticello Nuclear Plant began operation.

In May 2006, the Monticello Middle School had an electrical fire from the large amount of rain settling on the roof. The smoke damage to the school caused the school to be closed for the rest of the school year. As a result, middle school and high school students had to share usage of the high school building on an alternate-day schedule. The school year did not get extended, and the clean-up was completed in time for the 2006–07 school year.

== Economy ==
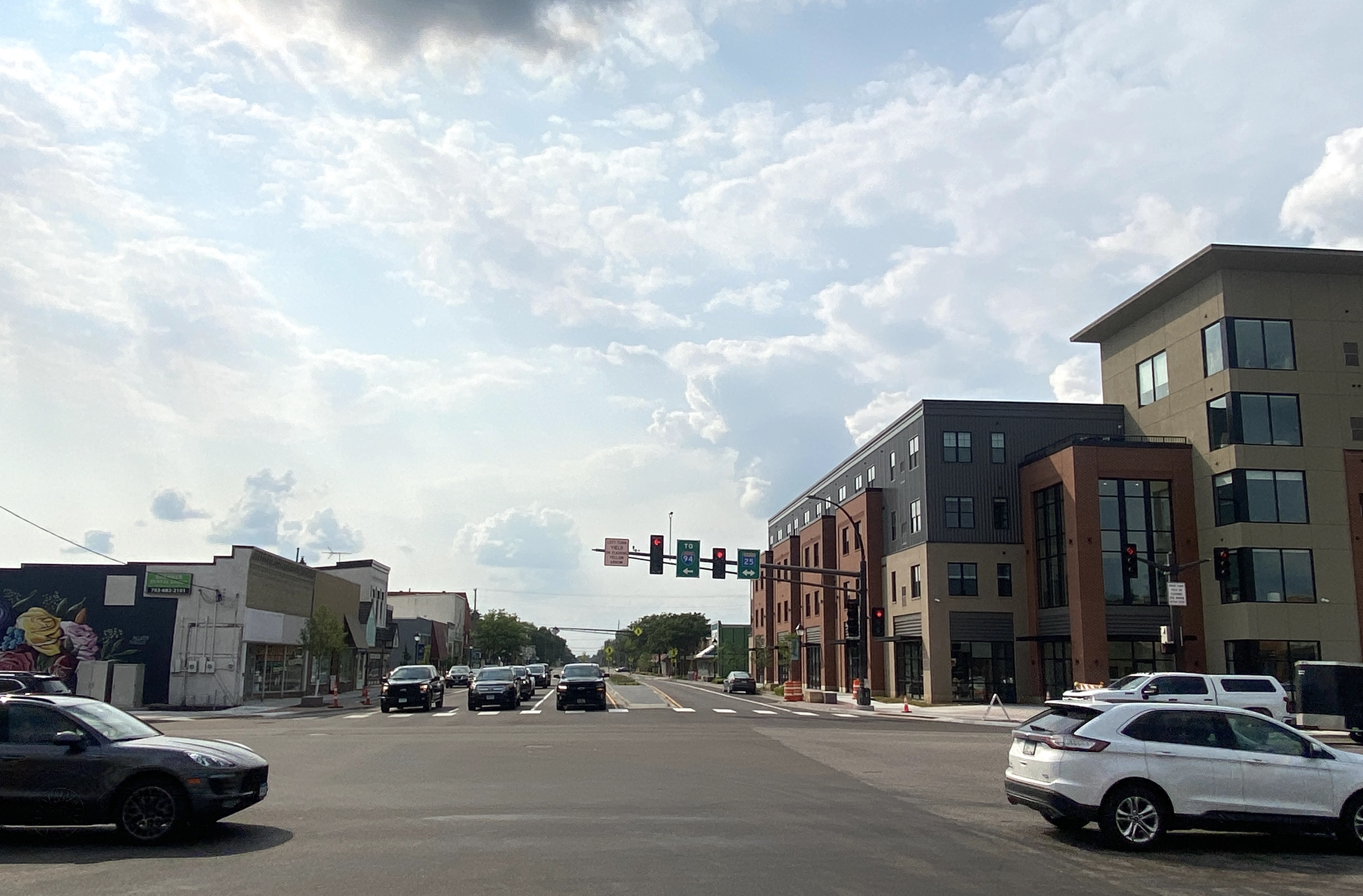
Broadway and Pine Streets

In anticipation of rapid population growth, Monticello created a comprehensive growth plan in 1996. A new high school was constructed in 1999. A new highway interchange was completed in 2006 on the east end of town, allowing residents full access to Interstate 94 from Wright County Road 18. Since 2002, many retail outlets have been constructed. This planned growth has also brought new auto dealerships, hotels, and industrial development. A 2004 annexation agreement with Monticello Township is expected to help sustain Monticello's growth for the next twenty years.

=== Top employers ===
According to Monticello's 2021 Annual Comprehensive Financial Report (ACFR), its top employers are:

#	Employer	# of Employees
1	Xcel Energy (Northern States)	600
2	ISD No. 882 (Monticello)	576
3	CentraCare Medical Center (New River)	500
4	Cargill Kitchen Solutions (Sunny Fresh)	350
5	Wal-Mart Supercenter	300
6	City of Monticello	230
7*	Home Depot	150
7*	Target	150
9	Ultra Machine Corporation	140
10*	Cub Foods	100
10*	WSI Industries, Inc.	100

* denotes tied ranks

== Education ==
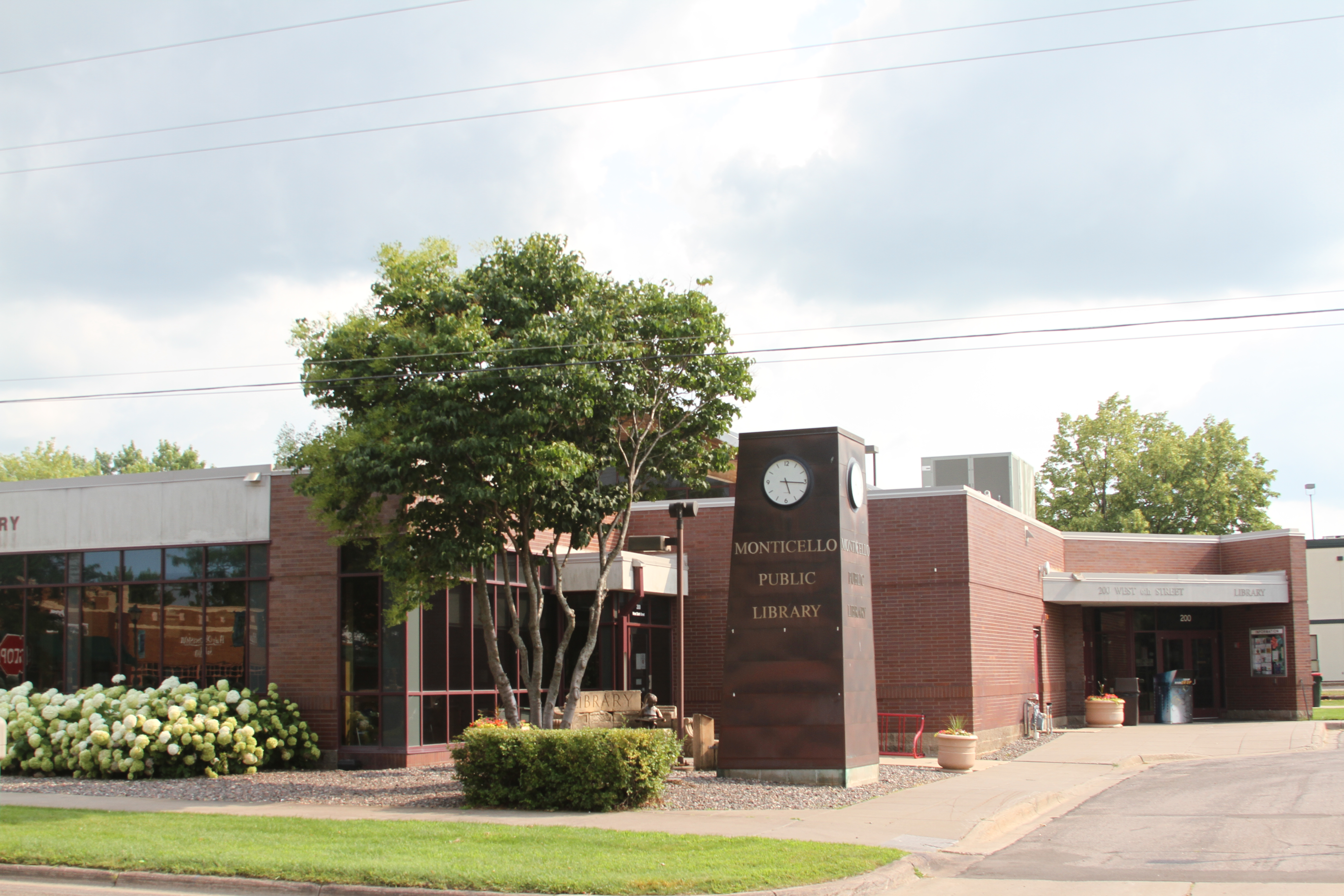
Monticello Public Library

Monticello is in the Monticello School District. Parts of nearby Monticello Township are in St. Michael-Albertville Schools.

Monticello High School is Wright County's third-largest school, with an estimated attendance of 1,314. The school's athletic teams were formerly known as the Redmen and are now the Magic.

== Demographics ==
Historical population
Census	Pop.	Note	%±
1880	290		—
1890	503		73.4%
1900	818		62.6%
1910	858		4.9%
1920	1,024		19.3%
1930	924		−9.8%
1940	1,076		16.5%
1950	1,231		14.4%
1960	1,477		20.0%
1970	1,636		10.8%
1980	2,830		73.0%
1990	4,941		74.6%
2000	7,868		59.2%
2010	12,759		62.2%
2020	14,455		13.3%
2022 (est.)	14,804		2.4%
U.S. Decennial Census; 2020 Census

Historical population
Census	Pop.	Note	%±
1880	104		—
1890	161		54.8%
2020	14,455		—
U.S. Census for Moritzious

=== 2020 census ===
As of the 2020 census, Monticello had a population of 14,455. The median age was 34.7 years. 27.8% of residents were under the age of 18 and 12.0% of residents were 65 years of age or older. For every 100 females there were 97.8 males, and for every 100 females age 18 and over there were 94.8 males age 18 and over.

99.1% of residents lived in urban areas, while 0.9% lived in rural areas.

There were 5,485 households in Monticello, of which 35.9% had children under the age of 18 living in them. Of all households, 46.4% were married-couple households, 18.1% were households with a male householder and no spouse or partner present, and 25.9% were households with a female householder and no spouse or partner present. About 27.4% of all households were made up of individuals and 11.0% had someone living alone who was 65 years of age or older.

There were 5,664 housing units, of which 3.2% were vacant. The homeowner vacancy rate was 0.8% and the rental vacancy rate was 3.8%.

Racial composition as of the 2020 census
Race	Number	Percent
White	12,267	84.9%
Black or African American	305	2.1%
American Indian and Alaska Native	53	0.4%
Asian	236	1.6%
Native Hawaiian and Other Pacific Islander	6	0.0%
Some other race	598	4.1%
Two or more races	990	6.8%
Hispanic or Latino (of any race)	1,178	8.1%

=== 2010 census ===
As of the census of 2010, there were 12,759 people, 4,693 households, and 3,164 families residing in the city. The population density was 1,427.2 inhabitants per square mile (551.0/km^{2}). There were 4,973 housing units at an average density of 556.3 per square mile (214.8/km^{2}). The racial makeup of the city was 92.6% White, 1.5% African American, 0.5% Native American, 1.0% Asian, 2.3% from other races, and 2.1% from two or more races. Hispanic or Latino of any race were 5.4% of the population.

There were 4,693 households, of which 43.1% had children under the age of 18 living with them, 49.2% were married couples living together, 12.2% had a female householder with no husband present, 6.0% had a male householder with no wife present, and 32.6% were non-families. 25.5% of all households were made up of individuals, and 9.5% had someone living alone who was 65 years of age or older. The average household size was 2.68 and the average family size was 3.23.

The median age in the city was 31.4 years. 30.8% of residents were under the age of 18; 7.7% were between the ages of 18 and 24; 33.3% were from 25 to 44; 18.7% were from 45 to 64; and 9.5% were 65 years of age or older. The gender makeup of the city was 49.2% male and 50.8% female.

=== 2000 census ===
As of the census of 2000, there were 7,868 people, the median income for a household in the city was $45,384, and the median income for a family was $53,566. Males had a median income of $41,057 versus $25,854 for females. The per capita income for the city was $19,229. About 4.2% of families and 4.6% of the population were below the poverty line, including 4.8% of those under age 18 and 7.4% of those age 65 or over.

== Government ==
The City Council of Monticello consists of the mayor and four councilmembers, with the mayor serving an elected two-year and councilmembers serving four-year staggered terms. The current mayor is Lloyd Hilgart, who took office in January 2023.

== Media ==
=== Newspapers ===
The local newspaper is The Monticello Times.

== Notable people ==
- Tobias Mealey – early Minnesota pioneer and politician. A significant reason that the Rand House was built in Monticello (for his daughter).
- Joel Przybilla – an American professional basketball player, who last played for the Milwaukee Bucks of the NBA. He is a Monticello High School alumnus.
- NATL PARK SRVC - indie band that plays in The Twin Cities.
- J.D. Duggan – a 2009 Monticello High School graduate and Twin Cities-based journalist for the Minneapolis-St. Paul Business Journal who is known for his retail and restaurant reporting as well as his prominent stature.
