= Tobias Mealey =

American politician

Tobias Gilmore "T.G." Mealey (August 5, 1823 – April 27, 1904) was a Canadian-born American entrepreneur, politician, and early settler of Minnesota. He grew up in New Brunswick, made his fortune in the California Gold Rush, and became an influential figure upon settling in Monticello, Minnesota. He served in both houses of the Minnesota Legislature between 1873 and 1882. The Tobias G. Mealey House, his 1855 home in Monticello, was listed on the National Register of Historic Places.

== Early years ==
Tobias Mealey was born in Charlotte County, New Brunswick, Canada, in 1823 and was educated in the common school system. He engaged in farm labor and lumbering for a few years, then entered the retail trade at age 22. In 1849 he joined the California Gold Rush, where he put his hand to mining, retail, construction, and lumbering. In 1852 he returned to New Brunswick with $25,000 in gold. On the way he passed through Minnesota and liked what he saw there. In 1855 he married Catherine Prescott and together they emigrated to Minnesota. Saint Paul was too well established for him and Minneapolis had yet to come into prominence, so Mealey opted to settle in Monticello, then still called Moritzious. He sited their house on a hill away from the Mississippi riverfront to get away from the saloons, boatmen, and lumberjacks he found too raucous.

== Business and politics ==
During his first year in Monticello, Mealey purchased an interest in a sawmill and opened a general store. In addition to hardware, groceries, footwear, and carpet, it was at the time the only store in Monticello to sell clothing. He soon sold both businesses and engaged in farming, but bought back into the general store in 1863. Later he developed business interests in a starch factory and a clothespin factory. His son S.J. joined him in running the general store. The elder Mealey forged connections with other influential Minnesotans, selling land to streetcar entrepreneur Thomas Lowry for a summer home and becoming close friends with railroad magnate James J. Hill.

Active in politics, Mealey served as a justice of the peace and a probate judge in Wright County. Previously identifying as a Republican, he followed 1872 presidential candidate Horace Greeley into the breakaway Liberal Republican Party as he ran for and won election to the Minnesota House of Representatives. Running thereafter as a Democrat, he won election the following year to the Minnesota Senate, serving in the 1874 and 1875 legislatures. He declined a nomination to run again in the 1875 election, but was a delegate to the 1876 Democratic National Convention and returned as a state senate candidate in 1877. He won, but in 1878 Minnesota switched to four-year terms for senators, sending him into another election that November. He was reelected and served through 1882. During his term he was instrumental in passing a new tax code that so improved on prior law it was known as the "iron-clad tax law".

== Personal life ==
Tobias Mealey married Catherine Prescott in New Brunswick in 1855. The couple had two sons and three daughters in Minnesota, enlarging their Monticello home several times to accommodate their growing family. In 1884 their daughter Susan married Rufus Rand, then vice-president of the Minneapolis Gas Light Company. As a wedding gift, the Mealeys gave the couple a large lot next to their own, upon which Susan designed the 30-room Rand House as a summer home. James J. Hill had a railroad spur constructed nearby for the convenience of his friend's wedding guests.

Tobias Mealey died in 1904, whereupon Catherine moved in with one of their daughters. Their son S.J. ran the Mealey general store, as well as the starch factory (which had become a leading local business) and the Monticello post office. He went on to serve as president of the Monticello State Bank, president of the Monticello Preserving Company, and manager of the Monticello Mill and Elevator, and was credited as one of the leading businessmen in Wright County.
