= Cornel Young Jr. =

American police officer (1970–2000)

Cornel Young Jr. (May 19, 1970 – January 28, 2000), known to his friends as "Jai," was a Black police officer in Providence, Rhode Island, who was fatally shot by two fellow police officers on January 28, 2000, when he stepped in on a scuffle while off duty. This sparked outrage and allegations of racial profiling. Young had served with the police department for three years, and had been trained with one of the shooters. The police officers who shot him were not charged. His mother filed a civil rights suit against the City of Providence and against the police responsible for his shooting, but the suit was unsuccessful. Young was posthumously promoted to the rank of sergeant. Cornel Young Jr. is commemorated with an elementary school named after him and a scholarship fund in his name.

== Circumstances of the shooting ==
Cornel Young Jr., while off-duty, was eating at Fidas Restaurant in Providence when a fight broke out between two patrons. Young observed a heated argument in the restaurant parking lot and saw a man with a gun, Aldrin Diaz. Attempting to break up the fight, Young drew his gun, which he was carrying as required by department rules, and told the man to freeze. Two Providence police officers, Carlos Saraiva and Michael Solitro III, arrived at the scene. Although Officer Young identified himself as a police officer, the on-duty officers apparently did not recognize Young in plainclothes, and only saw a Black man with a gun. Saraiva and Solitro allegedly told Young to drop his weapon and opened fire. They shot him six times. The officers then realized they had shot a fellow police officer and transferred him to a hospital; Young was pronounced dead a short time later.

== Reaction ==
There was community outrage over his death, citing this incident as racial profiling. One source of community outrage was that Saraiva had shot and seriously wounded another young man of color only three months before shooting Cornel Young, yet was cleared by the Providence police and put back on the street without being disciplined. A panel was created by the Rhode Island governor, to study police practices and race relations. Providence police protocol was changed to no longer require officers to carry a gun while off-duty. Aldrin Diaz was initially charged with felony-murder for assault with a deadly weapon and committing a crime during which someone was killed. Diaz's charge was dropped but he was sentenced to twenty years in prison for a probation violation. This garnered protest that Diaz was being used as a scapegoat. Young's mother filed a $20 million civil rights lawsuit against the city of Providence and the police officers involved, on the basis that Young's civil rights had been violated and that the city of Providence had not properly trained the officers in off-duty protocol. The case was dismissed by US district Judge Mary Lisi. The US Court of Appeals for the First Circuit in Boston overturned Lisi's decision to dismiss the case and it was sent back for trial in Providence on the grounds that the police department failed to properly train one of the officers. The jurors concluded that there was not sufficient evidence that the police officers hadn't been properly trained; the City of Providence was found not liable for the violation of Cornel Young Jr.'s constitutional rights and neither Saraivo or Solitro faced criminal charges.

== Commemoration ==
A wake was held for Cornel Young Jr. on February 1, 2000. His funeral was held the next day, with thousands in attendance. A memorial was held for Young at St. Michael Church in Providence, February 4, 2001, with hundreds in attendance. A scholarship fund for Providence high schoolers entering Community College of Rhode Island (CCRI) was set up by Young's parents in his memory. An elementary school in Providence, Sergeant Cornel Young Jr. Elementary School, was dedicated in his name November 6, 2001, and contains a large mural of him.
