= Same-sex marriage in Rhode Island =

Same-sex marriage has been legally recognized in Rhode Island since August 1, 2013. Same-sex marriage legislation passed the House of Representatives on January 24, 2013. The Senate passed an amended version on April 24 by a 26–12 vote, which the House approved on May 2 by 56 votes to 15. The bill was signed into law by Governor Lincoln Chafee the same day, and took effect on August 1, with the first same-sex marriages taking place that day. Rhode Island was the last U.S. state in New England to legalize same-sex marriage. Polling suggests that a large majority of Rhode Island residents support the legal recognition of same-sex marriage, with a 2024 Public Religion Research Institute poll showing that 79% of respondents supported same-sex marriage.

Previously, Rhode Island had authorized a limited form of domestic partnerships between 2002 to 2011 and the formation of civil unions from 2011 until the state began recognizing same-sex marriages in 2013.

== Background ==
Political debate on the legal recognition of same-sex marriage first emerged in the 1990s, but faced fierce opposition from the Catholic Church, which is influential in the state as Rhode Island has the highest proportion of Catholic residents of any state in the United States. Despite political opposition, Rhode Island began allowing unregistered domestic partnerships in 2002 that provided some limited legal benefits to same-sex couples. Notably, the surviving spouses in same-sex relationships, if police officers, fire fighters or correctional officers, could receive some death benefits. Domestic partners could also adjust their state taxes to reflect the costs of health insurance premiums, and could control the funeral arrangements of a deceased partner. This status became inactive with the state's adoption of civil unions in 2011.

In September 2006, Massachusetts Superior Court Justice Thomas E. Connolly ruled, in response to a 1913 law that prohibited Massachusetts from performing marriages that were not legal in the couple's home state, that same-sex couples living in Rhode Island could marry in Massachusetts. The ruling did not affect the status of such marriages in Rhode Island. In February 2007, Attorney General Patrick C. Lynch issued an opinion that same-sex marriages performed in Massachusetts could be recognized in Rhode Island, although he acknowledged that this was his personal opinion and did not have the force of law. The Human Rights Campaign noted that "[t]his is not a binding opinion and the attorney general noted that this question will most likely be answered by the courts." In December 2007, the Rhode Island Supreme Court held in a 3–2 opinion in Chambers v. Ormiston that the Family Court lacked jurisdiction to hear a divorce petition involving a same-sex couple who were married in Massachusetts. Justice William P. Robinson III wrote the majority opinion, joined by Chief Justice Frank J. Williams and Justice Frank Flaherty. Justice Paul Suttell's dissent was joined by Justice Maureen McKenna Goldberg.

== Civil unions ==
In 2001, a bill to create civil unions, similar to Vermont's, under Rhode Island's domestic relations statutes was introduced to the Rhode Island House of Representatives. Any Rhode Island law applying to marriages would have also applied to civil unions. The Judiciary Committee defeated the legislation.

Another bill to legalize civil unions was introduced to the Rhode Island General Assembly in May 2011. On May 19, the bill passed the House of Representatives by a vote of 62–11, with two representatives not voting. The Senate then passed the bill on a vote of 21–16 on June 29. Governor Lincoln Chafee signed the legislation on July 2, and it retroactively took effect as of July 1, 2011. The legislation included extensive and controversial exemptions that allowed any religiously affiliated organization or institution, such as schools, universities and hospitals, to deny recognition of civil partners, which made it unpopular with advocates of same-sex marriage. Further, same-sex civil partners could not access any of the federal benefits of marriage. Participation in civil unions was very low. As of February 2012, only 46 couples had established civil unions. The ability to enter into a civil union was closed off on August 1, 2013, when the state began offering same-sex marriage. Registered partners may retain their status or convert their union into a recognized marriage.

== Same-sex marriage ==
Same-sex marriage in the United States

=== Passage of legislation in 2013 ===
Bills to legalize same-sex marriage were first proposed in 1998. In 2004, Representative Arthur Handy and Senator Rhoda Perry introduced same-sex marriage legislation to the General Assembly. Perry's bill had four co-sponsors, and Handy's bill had eleven House co-sponsors. Both the House and Senate judiciary committees held hearings on the marriage bills, but neither took any action. Handy and Perry reintroduced their bills in 2005 with more co-sponsors, including two Republican lawmakers; however, the measures did not advance. In early 2011, legislation to legalize same-sex marriage was introduced to the General Assembly. Governor Lincoln Chafee, an independent, had previously indicated that he would sign such legislation if it were approved by the Assembly. In April 2011, the legislation stalled due to lack of support, and contentious debate. On May 14, 2012, Chafee signed an executive order recognizing out-of-state same-sex marriages.

On January 3, 2013, Representative Arthur Handy and Senator Donna Nesselbush introduced legislation to legalize same-sex marriage. The House version had 42 out of 75 members as sponsors, while the Senate version had 11 out of 38 senators. On January 7, the Roman Catholic Bishop of Providence, Thomas Tobin, called the legislation "immoral and unnecessary" and recommended a referendum over enacting same-sex marriage by statute. Governor Chafee said on January 11 that he would probably veto such a referendum. The Episcopal Bishop of Rhode Island, Nicholas Knisely, said he was "eager to see our state legislature join many others across the country in passing legislation to ensure civil marriage equality."

The House Judiciary Committee approved the legislation unanimously on January 22. The House passed the bill on a 51–19 vote two days later. The Rhode Island Council of Churches endorsed the legislation on January 31. On April 23, all 5 Republican state senators announced their support for the legislation—the first time a party's caucus in a state legislature had supported same-sex marriage unanimously—and the Senate Judiciary Committee approved the legislation in a 7–4 vote, while defeating a proposal to present the issue to voters as a referendum. On April 24, the Senate passed an amended version of the bill by a 26–12 vote. The House Judiciary Committee unanimously approved the amended legislation on April 30. The House passed the bill on May 2 on a vote of 56 to 15, and Chafee signed it into law the same day. Bishop Tobin reiterated his opposition the same day and wrote a letter to Rhode Island Catholics that said "homosexual acts are ... always sinful" and advised that "Catholics should examine their consciences very carefully before deciding whether or not to endorse same-sex relationships or attend same-sex ceremonies. To do so might harm their relationship with God."

April 24, 2013 vote in the Senate
Political affiliation	Voted for	Voted against	Absent (Did not vote)
Democratic Party	21: Stephen Archambault; William Conley Jr.; Catherine Cool Rumsey; Elizabeth Crowley; Daniel Da Ponte; James Doyle II; Paul Fogarty; Hanna Gallo; Gayle Goldin; Maryellen Goodwin; Paul Jabour; Frank Lombardo; Erin Lynch Prata; Joshua Miller; Donna Nesselbush; Ryan Pearson; Juan Pichardo; Leonidas Raptakis; Adam Satchell; James Sheehan; Susan Sosnowski	11: Frank Ciccone; Marc Cote; Louis DiPalma; Walter Felag; Frank Lombardi; Michael McCaffrey; Harold Metts; Roger Picard; Dominick Ruggerio; Teresa Paiva-Weed; William Walaska	–
Republican Party	5: Dennis Algiere; David Bates; Dawson Hodgson; Nicholas Kettle; Christopher Ottiano	–	–
Independent	–	1: Edward O'Neill	–
Total	26	12	0
Total	68.4%	31.6%	0.0%

May 2, 2013 vote in the House of Representatives
Political affiliation	Voted for	Voted against	Absent (Did not vote)
Democratic Party	54: Marvin Abney; Mia Ackerman; Edith Ajello; Joseph Almeida; David Bennett; Christopher Blazejewski; Dennis Canario; Maria Cimini; Elaine Coderre; Robert Craven; Anthony DeSimone; Grace Diaz; Spencer Dickinson; John Edwards; Deborah Fellela; Frank Ferri; Linda Finn; Gordon Fox; Raymond Gallison; Scott Guthrie; Arthur Handy; Joy Hearn; Robert Jacquard; Raymond Johnston; Katherine Kazarian; Cale Keable; Brian Kennedy; Donald Lally; Charlene Lima; John Lombardi; Karen MacBeth; Michael Marcello; Kenneth Marshall; Peter Martin; Nicholas Mattiello; Joseph McNamara; Helio Melo; Mary Messier; Eileen Naughton; Jared Nunes; William O'Brien; Jeremiah O'Grady; Patrick O'Neill; Thomas Palangio; Dominick Ruggerio; Patricia Serpa; Joe Shekarchi; Agostinho Silva; Scott Slater; Teresa Tanzi; Lisa Tomasso; Larry Valencia; Donna Walsh; Anastasia Williams	12: Samuel Azzinaro; Lisa Baldelli-Hunt; John Carnevale; Stephen Casey; Arthur Corvese; Gregory Costantino; Jan Malik; James McLaughlin; Robert Phillips; William San Bento; Stephen Ucci; Thomas Winfield	3: Gregg Amore; Raymond Hull; Peter Palumbo
Republican Party	2: Patricia Morgan; Brian Newberry	3: Doreen Costa; Antonio Giarrusso; Joe Trillo	1: Michael Chippendale
Total	56	15	4
Total	74.7%	20.0%	5.3%

The legislation took effect on August 1, 2013, with the first marriage licenses issued to same-sex couples when offices opened at 8:30 a.m. that day. The first couple to be issued a license in Providence were Gary McDowell and Zachary Marcus, who filed marriage paperwork at Providence City Hall shortly after 8:30 a.m. on August 1. The definition of marriage in Rhode Island law is now the following:

Marriage is the legally recognized union of two (2) people. Terms relating to the marital relationship or familial relationships shall be construed consistently with this section for all purposes throughout the law, whether in the context of statute, administrative or court rule, policy, common law, or any other source of civil law. [RI Gen L § 15-1-7]

=== Native American nations ===
The Indian Civil Rights Act primarily aims to protect the rights of Native Americans but also reinforces the principle of tribal self-governance. While it does not grant sovereignty, the Act affirms the authority of tribes to govern their own legal affairs. Consequently, many tribes have enacted their own marriage and family laws. As a result, the 2013 state law and the subsequent U.S. Supreme Court's ruling in Obergefell v. Hodges did not automatically apply to tribal jurisdictions. It is unclear if same-sex marriage is legal in the Narragansett Indian Tribe as tribal officials have not publicly commented on the issue.

Native Americans have deep-rooted marriage traditions, placing a strong emphasis on community, family and spiritual connections. While there are no records of same-sex marriages being performed in Native American cultures in the way they are commonly defined in Western legal systems, many Indigenous communities recognize identities and relationships that may be placed on the LGBT spectrum. Among these are two-spirit individuals—people who embody both masculine and feminine qualities. In some cultures, two-spirit individuals assigned male at birth wear women's clothing and engage in household and artistic work associated with the feminine sphere. Historically, this identity sometimes allowed for unions between two people of the same biological sex. In the case of the Narragansett, a lot of traditional knowledge was lost in the aftermath of colonization, and so there is no strong evidence that that their culture recognized an institutionalised two-spirit status. Two-spirit people are referred to as neese manitouog or noh waashpit (which literally translates to "he is effeminate") in Narragansett.

=== Demographics and marriage statistics ===
Data from the 2000 U.S. census showed that 2,471 same-sex couples were living in Rhode Island, with most couples living in Providence and Kent counties. Same-sex partners in Rhode Island were on average younger than opposite-sex partners, and significantly more likely to be employed. The median household income of same-sex couples was similar to that of different-sex couples, but same-sex couples were far less likely to own a home than opposite-sex partners. 12% of same-sex couples in Rhode Island were raising children under the age of 18, with an estimated 400 children living in households headed by same-sex couples in 2000.

The 2020 U.S. census showed that there were 2,775 married same-sex couple households (1,217 male couples and 1,558 female couples) and 2,204 unmarried same-sex couple households in Rhode Island.

== Public opinion ==
Public opinion for same-sex marriage in Rhode Island
Poll source	Dates administered	Sample size	Margin of error	Support	Opposition	Do not know / refused
Public Religion Research Institute	February 28 – December 8, 2025	152 adults	?	85%	14%	1%
Public Religion Research Institute	March 13 – December 2, 2024	155 adults	?	79%	18%	3%
Public Religion Research Institute	March 9 – December 7, 2023	152 adults	?	71%	23%	6%
Public Religion Research Institute	March 11 – December 14, 2022	?	?	80%	14%	6%
Public Religion Research Institute	March 8 – November 9, 2021	?	?	82%	17%	1%
Public Religion Research Institute	January 7 – December 20, 2020	139 adults	?	55%	41%	4%
Public Religion Research Institute	April 5 – December 23, 2017	222 adults	?	78%	17%	5%
Public Religion Research Institute	May 18, 2016 – January 10, 2017	369 adults	?	67%	29%	4%
Public Religion Research Institute	April 29, 2015 – January 7, 2016	279 adults	?	69%	24%	7%
Brown University	February 21–23, 2013	593 voters	± 4.0%	60%	26%	14%
Public Policy Polling	January 28–30, 2013	614 voters	± 4.0%	57%	36%	7%
Brown University	May 18–20, 2009	593 registered voters	± 4.0%	60%	31%	9%

Various polls have been commissioned by participants in the same-sex marriage debate, including by the Rhode Island chapter of the Gay & Lesbian Advocates & Defenders (GLAD) and the National Organization for Marriage (NOM), which opposes same-sex marriage. The poll results reflect different question wording and sampling, with NOM's polls generally showing far weaker support for same-sex marriage than other polls. Slightly more than half of Rhode Islanders are Catholic. A survey by Greenberg Quinlan Rosner Research for the Rhode Island Marriage Coalition in August 2010 showed that 63 percent of Catholics supported same-sex marriage provided it did not infringe on the Church's right to choose whom it marries.

The January 2013 poll from Public Policy Polling found that 57 percent of Rhode Island voters supported the legalization of same-sex marriage and 36 percent opposed legalization. Support was highest among voters under the age of 45 at 65 percent. Given other options, 31 percent preferred civil unions to marriage and 13 percent thought that there should be no legal recognition of same-sex relationships.

== See also ==
- LGBT rights in Rhode Island
- Same-sex marriage in the United States
