= List of first minority male lawyers and judges in Rhode Island =

This is a list of the first minority male lawyer(s) and judge(s) in Rhode Island. It includes the year in which the men were admitted to practice law (in parentheses). Also included are those who achieved other distinctions, such becoming the first in their state to graduate from law school or become a political figure.

== Firsts in Rhode Island's history ==
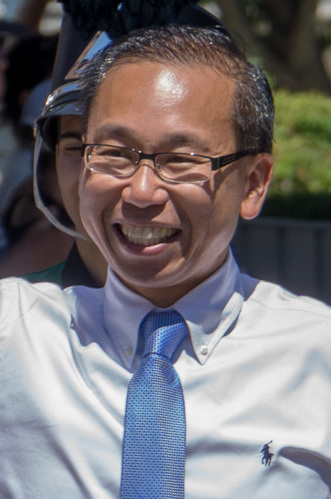
Allan Fung: First Asian American male to become a mayor in Rhode Island (2008)

Gordon Fox: First gay male to serve as Speaker of the Rhode Island House of Representatives (2010)

=== Lawyers ===
- First African American male: John Henry Ballou (1874)
- First Jewish American male: Daniel Fink (1883)
- First African American male admitted to practice before the U.S. Circuit Court of Rhode Island: William A. Heathman (1898) in 1901
- First Italian American male: Antonio A. Capotosto (1904)
- First African American male lawyer to work for the Attorney General's Office of Rhode Island: Walter R. Stone (1973)
- One of the first Latino American male lawyers: Angel Taveras

=== Law Clerk ===
- First African American male to clerk for the Supreme Court of Rhode Island: William A. Heathman (1898) around 1912

=== State judges ===
- First Jewish American male: J. Jerome Hahn in 1919
- First Jewish American male (Supreme Court of Rhode Island): J. Jerome Hahn in 1929
- First African American male: Alton W. Wiley, Sr. (1951) in 1981
- First Latino American males: Roberto González and Rafael A. Ovalles respectively 2004-2005

=== Federal judge ===
- First Jewish American male (United States District Court for the District of Rhode Island): Bruce M. Selya in 1982

=== Attorney General of Rhode Island ===
- First Jewish American male: Richard Israel in 1971

=== United States Attorney ===
- First Jewish American male (United States District Court for the District of Rhode Island): Jacob Temkin in 1953

=== Rhode Island Bar Association ===
- First Jewish American male president: Arthur Levy in 1951

=== Political Office ===
- First Jewish American male (Lieutenant Governor of Rhode Island): Richard A. Licht in 1985
- First Asian American male (Chinese descent) (mayor): Allan Fung (1995) in 2008
- First openly gay male (Speaker of the Rhode Island House of Representatives): Gordon Fox from 2010-2014

== Firsts in local history ==
- David Cicilline (1986): First Jewish and openly LGBT male (a lawyer) to become the Mayor of Providence, Rhode Island (2003-2011) [Providence County, Rhode Island]
- Angel Taveras: First Hispanic male (a lawyer of Dominican descent) to become the Mayor of Providence, Rhode Island (2011-2015) [Providence County, Rhode Island]
- Joseph Molina Flynn: First openly gay Latino American male to serve as a municipal court judge in Central Falls, Rhode Island (2021) [Providence County, Rhode Island]

== See also ==
- List of first minority male lawyers and judges in the United States

== Other topics of interest ==
- List of first women lawyers and judges in the United States
- List of first women lawyers and judges in Rhode Island
