= Dennis Algiere =

American politician (born 1960)

Minority Leader of the Rhode Island Senate
- In office January 7, 1997 – August 2, 2022
- Preceded by: ???
- Succeeded by: Jessica de la Cruz

Member of the Rhode Island Senate from the 38th district
- In office January 2003 – January 3, 2023
- Preceded by: John F. McBurney III
- Succeeded by: Victoria Gu

Member of the Rhode Island Senate from the 26th district
- In office January 1993 – January 2003
- Preceded by: Edward Morrone
- Succeeded by: Beatrice Lanzi

Personal details
- Born: July 30, 1960 (age 65) Westerly, Rhode Island, U.S.
- Party: Republican
- Education: Providence College (BA); Northeastern University (MS); Southern New England School of Law (JD)

Dennis L. Algiere (born July 30, 1960 in Westerly, Rhode Island) is an American politician and a Republican member of the Rhode Island Senate representing District 38 from January 2003 to January 2023. Algiere served consecutively from January 1993 until January 2003 in the District 26 seat.

== Education ==
Algiere earned his BA from Providence College, his MS from Northeastern University, and his JD from Southern New England School of Law (since closed).

== Elections ==
- 1992 When District 26 Democratic Senator Edward Morrone left the Legislature and left the seat open, Algiere won the September 15, 1992 Republican Primary and the November 3, 1992 General election with 4,312 votes (53.3%) against Democratic nominee Steven Hartford.
- 1994 Algiere was unopposed for both the September 13, 1994 Republican Primary and the November 8, 1994 General election, winning with 5,187 votes.
- 1996 Algiere was unopposed for both the September 10, 1996 Republican Primary, winning with 260 votes, and the November 5, 1996 General election, winning with 4,889 votes.
- 1998 Algiere was unopposed for both the September 15, 1998 Republican Primary, winning with 111 votes, and the November 3, 1998 General election, winning with 5,365 votes.
- 2000 Algiere was unopposed for both the September 12, 2000 Republican Primary and the November 7, 2000 General election, winning with 7,474 votes.
- 2002 Redistricted to District 38, and with incumbent Senator John F. McBurney III redistricted to District 15, Algiere was unopposed for both the September 10, 2002 Republican Primary, winning with 665 votes, and the November 5, 2002 General election, winning with 8,451 votes.
- 2004 Algiere was unopposed for both the September 14, 2004 Republican Primary and the November 2, 2004 General election with 10,731 votes.
- 2006 Algiere was unopposed for the September 12, 2006 Republican Primary, winning with 1,544 votes, and won the November 7, 2006 General election with 7,052 votes (57.6%) against Democratic nominee Patrick Schmitt.
- 2008 Algiere was unopposed for both the September 9, 2008 Republican Primary, winning with 20 votes, and the November 4, 2008 General election, winning with 11,128 votes.
- 2010 Algiere was unopposed for both the September 23, 2010 Republican Primary, winning with 451 votes, and the November 2, 2010 General election, winning with 8,378 votes.
- 2012 Algiere was unopposed for both the September 11, 2012 Republican Primary, winning with 294 votes, and the November 6, 2012 General election, winning with 10,055 votes.
