= Morrone (disambiguation) =

Morrone (Scottish Gaelic: Mór Bheinn, or Mór Shròn) is a Scottish hill immediately southwest of the village of Braemar in Aberdeenshire.

Morrone may also refer to:

== Places ==
- Montagne del Morrone, a mountain group in Abruzzo, central Italy, part of the Apennines
- Castel Morrone
- Morrone del Sannio
- Morrone Stadium, soccer stadium

== People ==
- Biagio Morrone (born 2000), Italian football player
- Camila Morrone (born 1997), Argentine female model and actress
- Edward Morrone, American politician
- Francis Morrone (born 1958), American architectural historian
- Frank Morrone, American audio engineer
- Giuliana Morrone, television presenter
- Joe Morrone (1935–2015), American college soccer coach
- Joe Morrone Jr. (born 1959), American soccer player
- Juan Carlos Morrone (born 1941), Argentine football player and manager
- Marc Morrone (born 1960), American animal dealer and breeder, and pet shop show host
- Megan Morrone (born 1973), American technology podcaster
- Stefano Morrone (born 1978), Italian football player

== See also ==
- Pietro da Morrone, alternative name for Pope Celestine V
- Morroni, people with the surname
