= Brian Patrick Kennedy =

American politician (born 1961)

Brian Kennedy

Speaker pro tempore of the Rhode Island House of Representatives
- Incumbent
- Assumed office January 12, 2017
- Preceded by: Elaine Coderre

President of the National Conference of State Legislatures
- In office 2023–2024
- Preceded by: Scott Bedke and Robin Vos
- Succeeded by: Wayne Harper

Member of the Rhode Island House of Representatives from the 38th district
- Incumbent
- Assumed office January 2003
- Preceded by: Timothy A. Williamson

Member of the Rhode Island House of Representatives from the 16th district
- In office January 1989 – January 2003
- Succeeded by: Peter Palumbo

Personal details
- Born: Brian Patrick Kennedy; January 3, 1961 (age 65) Westerly, Rhode Island, U.S.
- Party: Democratic
- Education: Providence College (BA); Anna Maria College (MBA)

Brian Patrick Kennedy (born January 3, 1961, in Westerly, Rhode Island) is an American politician and a Democratic member of the Rhode Island House of Representatives representing District 38 since January 2003. Kennedy served consecutively from January 1989 until January 2003 in the District 16 seat. He is also the Speaker Pro Tempore in the Rhode Island House of Representatives. From 2023–24, he served as president of the National Conference of State Legislatures.

== Education ==
Kennedy earned his BA in history and social studies from Providence College and his MBA from Anna Maria College.

== Elections ==
- 1988 Kennedy initially won election in the District 16 September 14, 1988 Democratic Primary and the November 8, 1988 General election.
- 1990 Kennedy won the September 11, 1990 Democratic Primary and won the November 6, 1990 General election, winning with 2,847 votes (69.6%) against Republican nominee Barton Jenks.
- 1992 Kennedy won the September 15, 1992 Democratic Primary and won the November 3, 1992 General election with 2,885 votes (70.8%) against Republican nominee Douglas Barber.
- 1994 Kennedy was unopposed for both the September 13, 1994 Democratic Primary and the November 8, 1994 General election, winning with 2,215 votes.
- 1996 Kennedy was unopposed for the September 10, 1996 Democratic Primary, winning with 202 votes, and won the three-way November 5, 1996 General election with 2,354 votes (59.0%) against Republican nominee Matthew Ulricksen and Cool Moose Party candidate Howard Schaffer.
- 1998 Kennedy was unopposed for the September 15, 1998 Democratic Primary, winning with 105 votes and won the November 3, 1998 General election with 1,773 votes (62.9%) against Republican nominee Robert Tingle.
- 2000 Kennedy was unopposed for the September 12, 2000 Democratic Primary, winning with 266 votes and won the November 7, 2000 General election with 2,761 votes (68.2%) against Republican nominee Marjorie Rekowski.
- 2002 Redistricted to District 38, and with incumbent Representative Peter Palumbo redistricted to District 16, Kennedy was unopposed for the September 10, 2002 Democratic Primary, winning with 410 votes and won the November 5, 2002 General election with 2,557 votes (63.9%) against Republican nominee Amanda Doescher.
- 2004 Kennedy was unopposed for the September 14, 2004 Democratic Primary, winning with 221 votes and won the November 2, 2004 General election with 3,550 votes (61.9%) against Republican nominee George Abbott.
- 2006 Kennedy was unopposed for both the September 12, 2006 Democratic Primary, winning with 380 votes, and the November 7, 2006 General election, winning with 3,319 votes.
- 2008 Kennedy was unopposed for the September 9, 2008 Democratic Primary, winning with 112 votes, and won the November 4, 2008 General election with 4,214 votes (67.0%) against Republican nominee Nancy Richmond.
- 2010 Kennedy was unopposed for the September 23, 2010 Democratic Primary, winning with 223 votes, and won the November 2, 2010 General election with 2,617 votes (56.1%) against Republican nominee Peter Bonk.
- 2012 Kennedy was unopposed for the September 11, 2012 Democratic Primary, winning with 245 votes; in a rematch of their 2010 contest, Kennedy won the November 6, 2012 General election with 3,803 votes (69.9%) against Independent candidate Peter Bonk.

Rhode Island House of Representatives
| Preceded by Elaine Coderre | Speaker pro tempore of the Rhode Island House of Representatives; 2017–present | Incumbent |
