= Katy Croff Bell =

American marine explorer

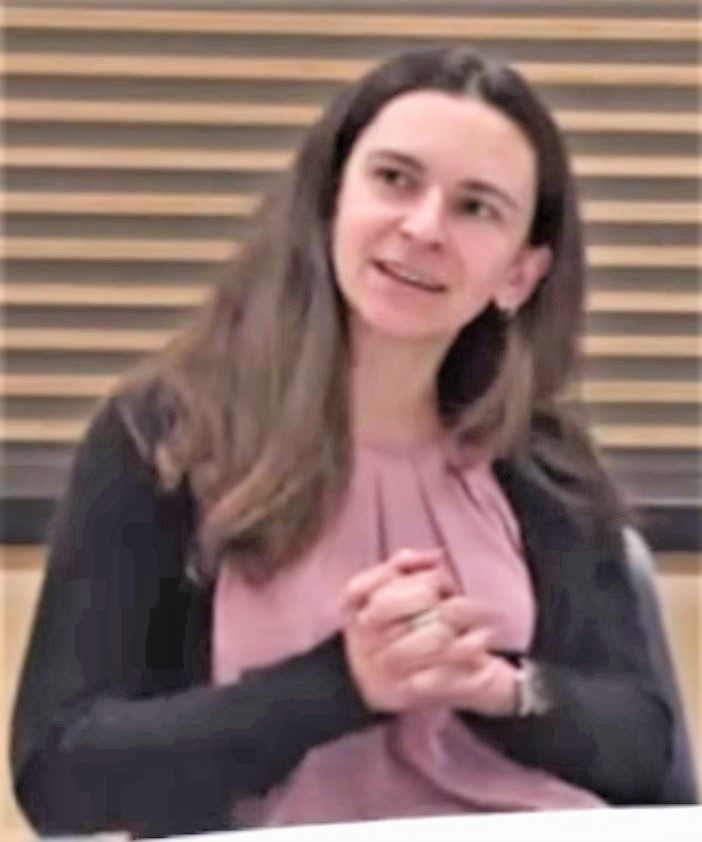
- Bell interviewed by Joichi Ito in 2016
- Education: Massachusetts Institute of Technology (B.S.); University of Southampton (M.S.); University of Rhode Island (Ph.D.)
- Known for: Ocean Exploration
- Scientific career
- Workplaces: MIT Media Lab; National Geographic Society

Katy Croff Bell is an American marine explorer who has been on more than 30 oceanographic and archaeological expeditions including in the Black Sea, the Mediterranean, the Gulf of Mexico, the Caribbean Sea, and the Pacific Ocean. She is also an American Association for Advancement of Science If/Then Ambassador in recognition of her work to interest girls in STEM careers.

== Education ==
Bell received a bachelor of science in ocean engineering from the Massachusetts Institute of Technology in 2000, working with Professor David Mindell in the Deepwater Archaeology group. Following college, she spent 2001 as a John A. Knauss Marine Policy Fellow in the NOAA Office of Ocean Exploration. She completed a master's degree in maritime archaeology at the University of Southampton, before moving to the Graduate School of Oceanography in Rhode Island. She was appointed a National Geographic Emerging Explorer in 2006. At the University of Rhode Island, she was awarded the Ada Sawyer Award in 2007 and the Robert McMaster Award in 2008. Bell completed a Doctor of Philosophy degree, "On the Origin of Submarine Sediment Features in the Southern Aegean Sea," at the University of Rhode Island in 2011, under the supervision of Robert Ballard.

== Research and career ==
In 2011, Bell became vice president of the Ocean Exploration Trust. She was Chief Scientist of Robert Ballard's exploration vessel E/V Nautilus, overseeing expeditions to the Mediterranean Sea, Black Sea, Gulf of Mexico, Caribbean Sea, eastern Pacific Ocean and the Aegean Sea. The Nautilus Exploration Program is an open science initiative, which shares the process and outcomes of ocean exploration with everyone. The expedition attracted a variety of media coverage, and Bell gave several interviews and lectures.

In addition being a leader of expeditions, Bell is also a lecturer of underwater exploration and technology. In 2014, she was a MIT Media Lab Director's Fellow. In 2015, she used telepresence technology to participate in Nautilus expeditions in the Gulf of Mexico and eastern Pacific Ocean. That year, she took part in the social media campaign #ILookLikeAnEngineer. She led a team of MIT explorers on a deep-ocean exploration off the coast of Southern California in 2016. In 2017, as an MIT Visiting Scientist, she created the Open Ocean initiative at the Media Lab. Bell is developing technology for ocean exploration projects, to allow for remote science and education, which is no longer active. Bell also said that, at the Open Ocean initiative, she is reimagining the future of ocean exploration and storytelling.

Bell is vice chair of the Marine Protected Areas Federal Advisory Committee and a PADI Advanced Open Water Diver. In July 2017, she became the first female Technology Fellow at National Geographic. She is a founding member of the Ocean Collectiv, a group formed to find solutions to ocean problems.

In 2021, Bell founded the nonprofit Ocean Discovery League, which focuses on expanding access to deep-sea exploration through the development of low-cost technologies. One such effort was the Deep Ocean Research and Imaging System (DORIS), a compact deep-submergence vehicle developed in partnership with Blue Robotics and funded by the National Oceanic and Atmospheric Administration.
