= Timothy Williamson (disambiguation) =

Timothy Williamson (born 1955) is a British philosopher.

Timothy or Tim Williamson may also refer to:

- Timothy A. Williamson (born 1962), American politician in Rhode Island
- Tim Williamson (1884–1943), English footballer
