= Coderre =

Coderre is a surname. Notable people with the surname include:

- Denis Coderre (born 1963), Canadian politician
- Elaine Coderre (born 1947), American politician
- Lionel Coderre (1915–1995), Canadian merchant and politician
- Louis Coderre (1865–1935), Canadian politician
