= LGBTQ rights in Rhode Island =

- Rhode Island (USA)
- Legal status: Legal since 1998
- Gender identity: Transgender people allowed to change legal gender
- Discrimination protections: Protections for sexual orientation and gender identity or expression

Family rights
- Recognition of relationships: Civil unions since 2011; Same-sex marriage since 2013
- Adoption: Same-sex couples allowed to adopt

Lesbian, gay, bisexual, transgender, and queer (LGBTQ) people in the U.S. state of Rhode Island have the same legal rights as non-LGBTQ people. Rhode Island established two types of major relationship recognition for same-sex couples, starting with civil unions on July 1, 2011, and then on August 1, 2013 with same-sex marriage. Discrimination on the basis of sexual orientation and gender identity is outlawed within the state namely in the areas of employment, housing, healthcare and public accommodations. In addition, conversion therapy on minors has been banned since 2017.

Rhode Island is frequently referred to as one of the United States' most LGBTQ-friendly states. Opinion polls have shown that a large majority of Rhode Islanders support same-sex marriage and LGBT rights. 2017 polling from the Public Religion Research Institute showed that 78% of Rhode Island respondents supported same-sex marriage.

== History of legality of same-sex sexual activity ==
In 1647, the first General Assembly of “The Incorporation of Providence Plantations in Narragansett Bay in New England" met in Portsmouth to codify the first set of laws governing the incorporation. The 1647 code is considered unusual for the time in America, for finding justification with the new testament instead of the old testament. The statute "Touching Whormongers" provided the death penalty for a number of offenses including sodomy, bestiality, fornication, and rape. The law was reworded in 1663 and 1729, removing references to the New Testament, but the death penalty remained. No prosecutions are known to have occurred.

In 1798, the state again reworded the law, lightening the penalty for a first offense, reading that any person convicted of sodomy shall "be carried to the gallows in a cart, and set upon the said gallows, for a space of time not exceeding four hours, and thence to the common gaol, there to be confined for a term not exceeding three years, and shall be grievously fined at the discretion of the Court". A second offense would result in death. The death penalty was removed as a penalty in 1844; punishment was set at 1 to 12 years' imprisonment. This was raised to 7 to 20 years' imprisonment in 1881.

The Newport sex scandal arose from a 1919 investigation by the United States Navy into homosexual acts by Navy personnel and civilians in Newport, Rhode Island. The investigation was noted for its controversial methods of intelligence gathering, specifically its use of enlisted personnel to investigate alleged homosexuals by engaging them sexually. A subsequent trial attracted national news coverage and provoked a congressional investigation, which concluded with Secretary of the Navy Josephus Daniels and Assistant Secretary of the Navy (and future United States president) Franklin D. Roosevelt being formally rebuked by a Congressional committee.

The first recorded sodomy case in state courts occurred in 1962; in State v. Milne, the Rhode Island Supreme Court held that fellatio (oral sex) constituted an "abominable and detestable crime against nature". In 1973, the Commission on Jurisprudence of the Future recommended amending state law to remove the sodomy provisions, but this was rejected by the Rhode Island General Assembly. In State v. Levitt in 1977, the state Supreme Court rejected arguments that the sodomy law was unconstitutionally vague, and in 1980 in State v. Santos rejected claims that the law was a breach of privacy rights. In State v. McParlin in 1980, the court held that cunnilingus was also a violation of the sodomy statute. The Supreme Court again upheld the law as constitutional in 1995 in State v. Lopes. At that time, the law applied to consensual and non-consensual acts, whether between heterosexual or homosexual partners, and whether conducted in private or public.

Same-sex sexual acts between consenting adults in private have been legal in Rhode Island since anti-sodomy statutes were repealed in 1998. State Representative Edith Ajello sponsored the repeal bill for the seventh time when the Rhode Island House of Representatives passed it in May 1998. After the Rhode Island Senate passed it on June 2, 1998, Governor Lincoln Almond signed it into law.

In November 2019, Governor Gina Raimondo signed a bill into law whereby LGBT veterans who received a dishonorable discharge under Don't Ask, Don't Tell can have that discharge changed, and ensures that those veterans have access to veteran benefits.

== Recognition of same-sex relationships ==
Rhode Island legalized same-sex marriage on August 1, 2013. On February 20, 2007, Attorney General Patrick C. Lynch issued an opinion holding that same-sex marriages performed in Massachusetts would be recognized in Rhode Island. He said that "his interpretation permitted recognition of the marriages, although he acknowledged that it was just an opinion and did not have the force of law." On May 14, 2012, Governor Lincoln Chafee issued an executive order directing state agencies to treat same-sex marriages performed out-of-state as the equivalent of marriage. On September 21, 2012, the state's Division of Taxation, ruling in an estate tax case, announced it would treat couples in same-sex marriages or civil unions established in other jurisdictions as legally married, basing its decision on the state's civil union law and the state's tradition of recognizing marriages validly performed elsewhere.

Rhode Island has provided benefits to same-sex partners of state employees since 2001.

A bill to legalize same-sex marriage was introduced in the Rhode Island General Assembly on January 11, 2011. Governor Lincoln Chafee announced his support. In May 2011, a bill to legalize civil unions for same-sex couples was introduced. It passed the House of Representatives by a vote of 62–11, and passed the Senate on June 29 by a vote of 21 to 16. Governor Chafee signed the legislation on July 2, 2011 and the law was made effective from July 1, 2011. By January 2013, only 68 couples had obtained civil union licenses.

Legislation establishing same-sex marriage in Rhode Island was enacted in May 2013, effective August 1. Since August 1, two persons who are parties to a civil union entered into before that date may convert their union into a marriage.

== Adoption and parenting ==
The Rhode Island Family Court routinely grants same-sex adoptions and has been doing so since at least 1995. Couples need not reside in Rhode Island and may be adopting their own birth child, using a surrogate, or adopting a child already placed with them. A decree lists both partners as parents. After the adoption, the Rhode Island Department of Health, Division of Vital Statistics will amend the birth certificate of a child born in Rhode Island to name both partners as parents. A birth certificate issued in Rhode Island carries the names of both parents, including same-sex parents.

Lesbian couples have access to in vitro fertilization. State law recognizes the non-genetic, non-gestational mother as a legal parent to a child born via donor insemination. Surrogacy is neither prohibited nor expressly permitted in Rhode Island. Whether a surrogacy contract, gestational or traditional, will be recognized depends on the Rhode Island Family Court. Based on recent decisions from said court, the state may grant parentage declarations before birth to married couples, unmarried couples and individuals. Same-sex couples are treated in the same manner as opposite-sex couples.

In July 2020, the General Assembly amended state parentage laws to insure that unmarried couples and same-sex couples do not require going to court to obtain legal rights to their child. Governor Gina Raimondo, who signed the bill into law, said, "No parent should have to jump through hoops to receive legal recognition because of their sexual orientation or the circumstances of their child's birth. The Rhode Island Uniform Parentage Act enshrines into law our belief in the validity of all paths to parenthood." The law went into effect on January 1, 2021. Previously, the state required the non-biological mother in a lesbian couple to complete a traditional adoption process. The new law insures that the couple need not go to court or go through adoption home study, and the non-biological mother is automatically recognized as a legal parent, akin to the father in an opposite-sex couple. The state's child protective services agency expressed support for the new law, stating that the previous requirement of home study for same-sex couples having to adopt their own children was a "waste of the department's resources".

== Legal Protections ==
Rhode Island has a criminal statute covering hate crimes motivated by both sexual orientation and gender identity or expression. The law provides penalty enhancements for the commission of a crime motivated by the victim's actual or perceived sexual orientation or gender identity, among other categories.

Rhode Island law has outlawed discrimination on the basis of sexual orientation since 1995 and on the basis of gender identity or expression since 2001 in employment, credit, housing and public accommodations. In June 2023, a bill passed both houses of the Rhode Island Legislature and was signed into law by the Governor of Rhode Island to formally implement legislation to explicitly ban discrimination on the basis of sexual orientation and gender identity - within regards to patient care, nursing and related healthcare in Rhode Island.

In July 2021, two bills passed the Rhode Island General Assembly regarding "pay disclosure and discrimination" within employment and repealing the archaic 1995 "housing with 3 occupiers or less loophole exemptions" - based on an individual's sexual orientation and gender identity. The Governor of Rhode Island signed the two bills into law - becoming legally effective from January 1, 2023.

Moreover, the state's anti-bullying law prohibits bullying on the basis of race, color, religion, ancestry, national origin, sex, sexual orientation, gender identity and expression, and mental, physical and sensory disability. The law also explicitly includes cyberbullying and harassment, and applies to all public schools.

=== End of gay panic defense ===
In June 2018, a bill to repeal the gay and trans panic defense passed the Rhode Island General Assembly by a vote of 68–2 in the House and 27–0 in the Senate. Governor Gina Raimondo signed the bill into law a month later, and it went into effect immediately.

=== Conversion therapy prohibition ===
On January 27, 2017, state representatives Edith Ajello, Joseph McNamara, Susan Donovan, J. Aaron Regunberg and Moira Walsh introduced a bill (H 5277) to prohibit conversion therapy on minors and ban funding for such practices by the state and its political subdivisions. On May 24, the House Committee on Health, Education and Welfare recommended indefinite postponement of the original bill and passage of its substitute (H 5277 Substitute A). On May 30, the House approved the bill in a unanimous 69–0 vote, with six members not voting. In June 2017, the Rhode Island Senate passed the legislation by a unanimous vote of 29–0 with 1 absent from the chamber floor. The bill had to go back to the House due to a technical amendment, which was passed again unanimously 62–0. On July 19, 2017, Governor Gina Raimondo signed the bill into law and it went into effect immediately.

== Transgender rights ==
Previously, the Rhode Island Department of Health only altered the gender designation on a person's birth certificate based on documentation of sex reassignment surgery. On October 23, 2014, new regulations took effect which established that modifying a birth certificate requires completing a "Birth Certificate Request Form" and submitting an affidavit from a physician, certified nurse practitioner or physician's assistant confirming the applicant's transgender status. The Department of Motor Vehicles will issue an updated driver's license with a corrected gender marker upon receipt of a completed "Gender Designation Form" signed by the applicant.

In June 2018, the Rhode Island General Assembly passed a bill to ensure that transgender people are correctly recorded on death certificates. The bill was later signed into law by Governor Gina Raimondo and went into effect immediately.

In August 2019, the Department of Health and the Department of Motor Vehicles announced that from July 2020 driver's licenses and birth certificates would include a third gender option (alongside "male" and "female"), known as "X".

=== Gender-neutral bathrooms ===
Effective since January 1, 2022 Rhode Island legally allows gender-neutral bathrooms for single occupancy toilets - under a bill the Governor of Rhode Island signed into law in July 2021. California, New York State, Illinois and New Mexico have similar laws implemented.

=== Sports ===
In March 2025 Rhode Island Interscholastic League (RIIL) updated its transgender athletes' policy sparking protest. Petition organizer & teacher, Syed Menebhi demanded a return to the previous policy “that allowed student-athletes to participate in sports consistent with their gender identity”. Transgender athletes remain able to compete for RIIL-sanctioned teams but "Member schools are responsible for ensuring compliance with all applicable state and federal law when determining gender-based eligibility."

== Public opinion ==
A 2022 Public Religion Research Institute (PRRI) poll found that 80% of Rhode Island residents supported same-sex marriage, while 14% were opposed and 5% were unsure. The same poll found that 84% of Rhode Island residents supported discrimination protections, while 9% opposed and 8% were unsure.

Public opinion for LGBTQ anti-discrimination laws in Rhode Island
Poll source	Date(s) administered	Sample size	Margin of error	% support	% opposition	% no opinion
Public Religion Research Institute	January 2-December 30, 2019	163	?	76%	17%	7%
Public Religion Research Institute	January 3-December 30, 2018	164	?	73%	23%	4%
Public Religion Research Institute	April 5-December 23, 2017	222	?	75%	19%	6%
Public Religion Research Institute	April 29, 2015-January 7, 2016	279	?	84%	15%	1%

== Summary table ==
Same-sex sexual activity legal with an equal age of consent set at 16 implemented	Yes (Since 1998)
Anti-discrimination laws for sexual orientation	Yes (Since 1995)
Anti-discrimination laws for gender identity	Yes (Since 2011)
LGBT anti-bullying law in schools and colleges	Yes
Same-sex marriage legalization implemented	Yes (Since 2013)
Joint and stepchild adoption by same-sex couples	Yes
Lesbian, gay and bisexual people allowed to serve openly in the military	Yes (Since 2011)
Transgender people allowed to serve openly in the military	No (Since 2025 by a Executive Order and a SCOTUS decision)
Right to change legal gender without any surgery and sterilization requirements	Yes
Gender-neutral bathroom laws implemented	Yes (Since 2022)
Third gender options	Yes (Since 2020)
Conversion therapy banned on minors	Yes (Since 2017)
Gay and trans panic defense banned	Yes (Since 2018)
Surrogacy arrangements legal for gay male couples and IVF access for lesbian couples	Yes
MSMs allowed to donate blood	Yes (Since 2023, on the condition of being monogamous)
