= Raymond Sullivan =

Raymond Sullivan may refer to:

- Ray Sullivan (1977–2021), member of the Rhode Island House of Representatives
- Raymond F. Sullivan (1908–1994), American politician from Massachusetts
- Raymond L. Sullivan (1907–1999), California Supreme Court justice
- Gilbert O'Sullivan (Raymond Edward O'Sullivan, born 1946), Irish singer-songwriter
