= Walter Gray =

Walter Gray may refer to:

- Walter de Gray (died 1255), British prelate and statesman
- Walter H. Gray (1898–1973), American bishop of the Episcopal Church in the United States of America
- Walter J. Gray (1928–2024), American politician and formed member of the Rhode Island State Senate
