= Senator McBurney =

Senator McBurney may refer to:

- Andrew McBurney (1815–1894), Ohio State Senate
- John F. McBurney III (born 1950), Rhode Island State Senate
