= Peter Palumbo =

Peter Palumbo may refer to:

- Peter Palumbo, Baron Palumbo (born 1935), British property developer, art collector, and former chairman of the Arts Council of Great Britain
- Peter Palumbo (politician) (born 1961), American politician and a Democratic member of the Rhode Island House of Representatives
