= Senator Goldberg =

Senator Goldberg may refer to:

- Richard W. Goldberg (1927–2023), North Dakota State Senate
- Robert D. Goldberg (born 1951), Rhode Island State Senate
