= Shelby Maldonado =

American politician (born 1987)

Member of the Rhode Island House of Representatives from the 56th district
- In office January 6, 2015 – December 17, 2019
- Preceded by: Agostinho Silva
- Succeeded by: Joshua Giraldo

Personal details
- Born: July 24, 1987 (age 39)
- Party: Democratic

Shelby Maldonado (born July 24, 1987) is an American politician affiliated with the Democratic Party. She is an alumna of Roger Williams University School of Law. Maldonado represented the 56th district, centered in Central Falls, in the Rhode Island House of Representatives from 2015 to 2019. Maldonado announced her resignation in December 2019. Since January 2023, she has been serving as the deputy Secretary of State of Rhode Island.
