= List of first women lawyers and judges in Rhode Island =

This is a list of the first women lawyers and judges in Rhode Island. It includes the year in which the women were admitted to practice law (in parentheses). Also included are women who achieved other distinctions such becoming the first in their state to graduate from law school or become a political figure.

== Firsts in state history ==
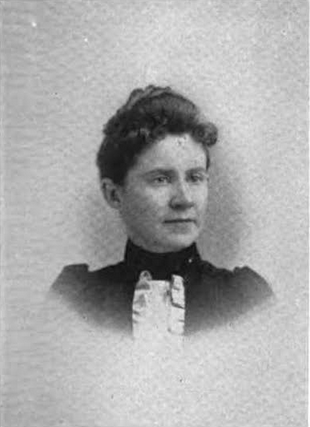
Mary Ann Greene: First female lawyer to argue a case before the Rhode Island Supreme Court (1907)

=== Lawyers ===
- First female to argue a case before the Rhode Island Supreme Court: Mary Ann Greene (1888; Massachusetts) in 1907
- First female: Ada Lewis Sawyer (1920)
- First African American female: Dorothy Crockett (1932)
- First female appointed to the Public Defender's Office: Allegra E. Munson (c. 1970s)

=== Law Clerk ===
- First female to clerk for Rhode Island's federal courts: Sandra L. Lynch (1971)

=== State judges ===
- First female: Florence K. Murray (1942) in 1956
- First female (district court): Corinne P. Grande in 1969
- First female (Chief Justice; Rhode Island Superior Court): Florence K. Murray (1942) from 1978-1979
- First female (Rhode Island Supreme Court): Florence K. Murray (1942) from 1979-1996
- First Jewish American female (Rhode Island Supreme Court): Victoria Lederberg in 1993
- First openly lesbian female: Melissa Dubose in 2019
- First African American (female) (Rhode Island Supreme Court): Melissa A. Long in 2021
- First Asian American (female) (superior court): Linda Rekas Sloan in 2021
- First Latino American female (Rhode Island Family Court): Elizabeth Ortiz in 2021
- First Indian American (female) (Rhode Island Family Court): Shilpa Naik in 2022

=== Federal judges ===
- First African American female (U.S. Court of Appeals for the First Circuit): Ojetta Rogeriee Thompson (1976) in 2010
- First female (United States Magistrate Judge; United States District Court, District of Rhode Island): Patricia Sullivan in 2012
- First African American and LGBT [female] (United States District Court for the District of Rhode Island): Melissa R. DuBose in 2024

=== Attorney General of Rhode Island ===
- First female: Arlene Violet (1974) in 1985

=== Deputy Attorney General ===
- First female: Susan E. McGuirl

=== United States Attorney ===
- First female: Margaret E. Curran (1983) from 1998-2003

=== Public Defender ===
- First female: Mary S. McElroy in 2012

=== Rhode Island Bar Association ===
- First female president: Beverly Glen Long from 1981-1982
- First Jewish American female president: Susan DeBlasio in 1989
- First African American (female): Jametta Alston in 2004

=== Political offices ===
- First female (senator): Florence K. Murray (1942)
- First openly lesbian female (Rhode Island Senate; Fifteenth District): Donna Nesselbush (c. 1991) in 2011

== Firsts in local history ==
- Angelyne Cooper: First African American (female) to serve as a municipal court judge in Cranston, Providence County, Rhode Island (2021)
- Elizabeth Ortiz: First Latino American female to serve as a municipal court judge in Central Falls (2019) [Providence County, Rhode Island]
- Debra L. Chernick: First female President of the Washington County Bar Association, Rhode Island (2000-2004)

== See also ==
- List of first women lawyers and judges in the United States
- Timeline of women lawyers in the United States
- Women in law

== Other topics of interest ==
- List of first minority male lawyers and judges in the United States
- List of first minority male lawyers and judges in Rhode Island
