= Jessica de la Cruz =

American politician (born 1981)

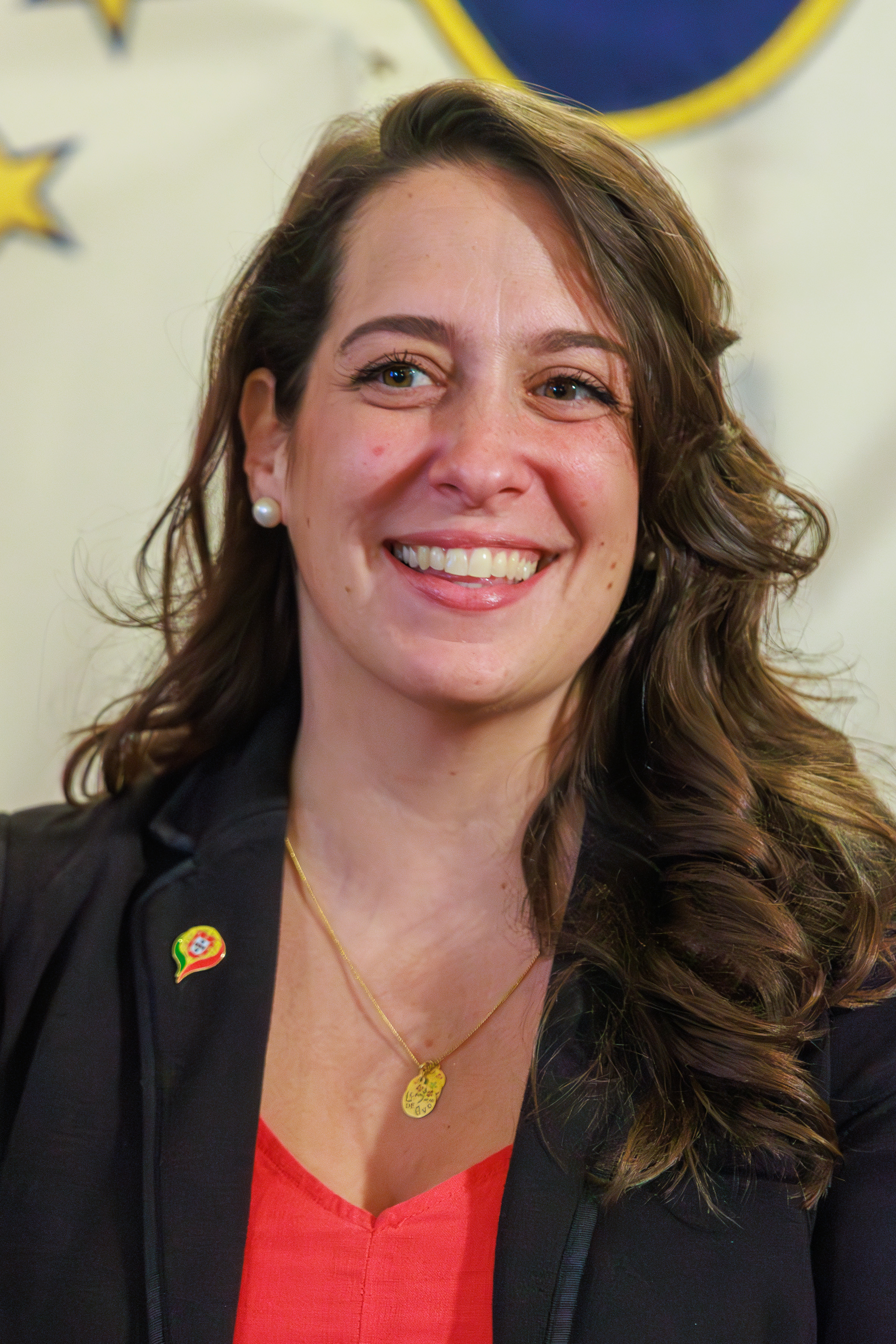
- de la Cruz in 2025

Minority Leader of the Rhode Island Senate
- Incumbent
- Assumed office August 2, 2022
- Preceded by: Dennis Algiere

Member of the Rhode Island Senate from the 23rd district
- Incumbent
- Assumed office January 1, 2019
- Preceded by: Paul Fogarty

Personal details
- Born: July 20, 1981 (age 45) Rhode Island, U.S.
- Party: Republican
- Spouse: David de la Cruz

Jessica de la Cruz (born July 20, 1981) is an American politician serving as a member of the Rhode Island Senate from the 23rd district, which includes all of Burrillville and Glocester and part of North Smithfield. Elected in November 2018, she assumed office on January 1, 2019. She is a Republican.

== Early life ==
De la Cruz was born on July 20, 1981, in Rhode Island to Portuguese immigrant parents, of Madeira and Azores.

== Career ==
On November 6, 2018, de la Cruz was elected to the Rhode Island Senate, where she has represented the 23rd district since January 1, 2019. She is a Republican. She was previously the senate minority whip, and in 2022 was named the senate minority leader by her four Republican colleagues. She gave the Republican rebuttals to governor Dan McKee's State of the State addresses in 2023 and 2025.

== Personal life ==
De la Cruz resides in the Forestdale section of North Smithfield. She and her husband, David, have three children. Her husband David is one of the pastors at Awakening Church in Smithfield, Rhode Island.

== Elections ==
2024 general election: Rhode Island State Senate, District 23
Party	Candidate	Votes	%
Republican	Jessica de la Cruz	11,054	68.1%
Democratic	Lewis Pryeor	5,170	31.8%

2020 general election: Rhode Island State Senate, District 23
Party	Candidate	Votes	%
Republican	Jessica de la Cruz	10,361	66.5%
Democratic	Paul Roselli	5,131	32.9%

2018 general election: Rhode Island State Senate, District 23
Party	Candidate	Votes	%
Republican	Jessica de la Cruz	6,217	55.4%
Democratic	Kevin Heitke	4,983	44.4%

Rhode Island Senate
Preceded by Dennis Algiere	Minority Leader of the Rhode Island Senate; 2022–present	Incumbent
