= Chester W. Barrows =

American judge (1872–1931)

Justice Chester Willard Barrows
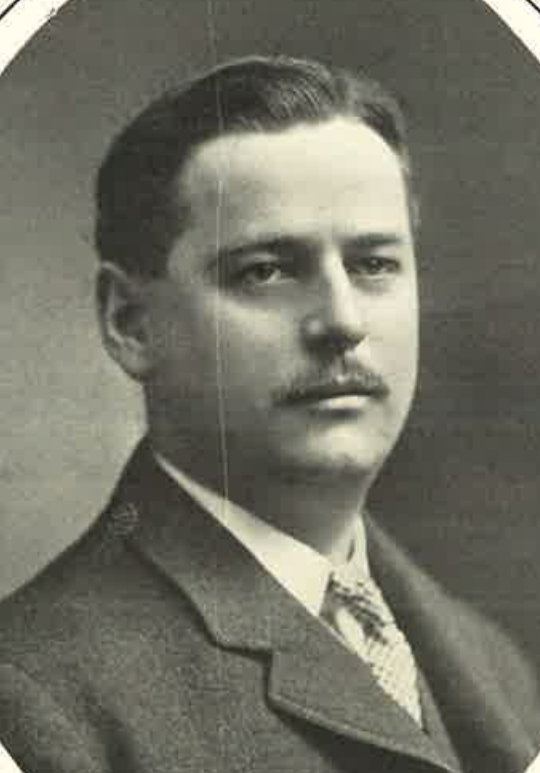
- Chester W. Barrows c. 1904

Justice of the Rhode Island Supreme Court
- In office 1925 – February 19, 1931
- Preceded by: Walter B. Vincent

Personal details
- Born: July 4, 1872 Woonsocket, Rhode Island
- Died: February 19, 1931 (aged 58)
- Party: Independent Republican
- Spouse: Mary E. Crossley
- Children: 1 daughter
- Education: Brown University (BA), Harvard Law School (LLB)
- Occupation: Lawyer, Judge

Chester Willard Barrows (July 4, 1872 – February 19, 1931) was a justice of the Rhode Island Supreme Court from 1925 until his death in 1931.

Born in Woonsocket, Rhode Island, to William G. and Lydia S. (Willard) Barrows, he attended the public schools of Providence, and graduated from Brown University in 1895, and from Harvard Law School 1898. Gaining admission to the bar in Providence the same year, he entered the practice of law in that city. He served at times as a member of the State Board of Bar Examiners, an instructor in Law at Brown University, and a United States Referee in Bankruptcy.

On January 21, 1925, Barrows was appointed by the state legislature to a seat on the state supreme court vacated by the resignation of Justice Walter B. Vincent.

Barrows married Mary E. Crossley, with whom he had a daughter. He was an independent Republican.

Political offices
Preceded by Walter B. Vincent	Justice of the Rhode Island Supreme Court; 1925–1931	Succeeded by J. Jerome Hahn
