= Daniel P. Reilly =

American politician (born 1989)

Daniel Reilly
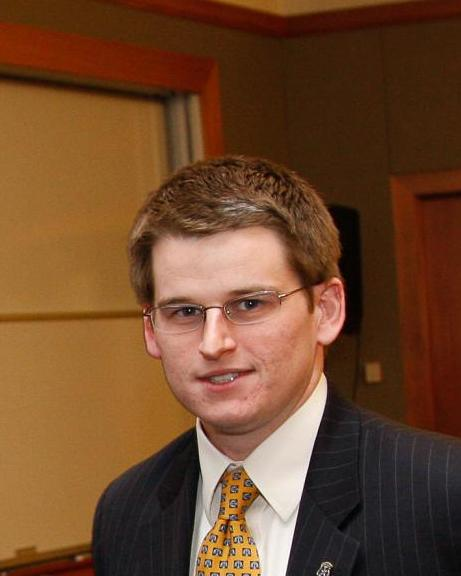

Member of the Rhode Island House of Representatives from the 72 district
- In office January 2015 – January 2017
- Preceded by: Linda Finn
- Succeeded by: Kenneth Mendonça
- In office January 2011 – January 2013
- Preceded by: Amy Rice
- Succeeded by: Linda Finn

Personal details
- Born: July 24, 1989 (age 37)
- Party: Republican
- Education: Providence College; Roger Williams University

Daniel Reilly (born July 24, 1989) is an American politician and a Republican formerly a member of the Rhode Island House of Representatives who represented District 72.

== Education ==
Reilly graduated from Providence College in 2012.

== Elections ==
- 2014 Reilly ran unopposed for the 2014 Republican Primary and won the November 6, 2014 General election with 3114 votes (54%) against Linda Finn Democratic Incumbent candidate who lost with 2640 votes (45.8%).
