= Steven M. Costantino =

American politician

Rhode Island Secretary of Health and Human Services
- In office January 4, 2011 – January 6, 2015
- Governor: Lincoln Chafee
- Preceded by: Gary D. Alexander
- Succeeded by: Elizabeth H. Roberts

Member of the Rhode Island House of Representatives from the 8th district
- In office January 7, 2003 – January 4, 2011
- Preceded by: Thomas Palangio
- Succeeded by: Michael A. Tarro

Member of the Rhode Island House of Representatives from the 14th district
- In office January 3, 1995 – January 7, 2003
- Preceded by: Frank T. Caprio
- Succeeded by: Charlene Lima

Personal details
- Born: June 16, 1957 (age 69) Providence, Rhode Island
- Party: Democratic
- Education: Providence College
- Profession: Grocer, Restaurateur

Steven M. Costantino (born June 16, 1957) is an American politician who is a former Democratic member of the Rhode Island House of Representatives, representing the 8th District since 1995. His term ended in January 2011. During the 2009-2010 sessions he served as chairman of the House Finance Committee. In June, 2010 he announced that he would not run for another term and that he would be running as mayor of Providence, Rhode Island. He lost in the 2010 Democratic primary for the mayor to Angel Taveras.

He served as Secretary of Health and Human Services under Governor Lincoln Chafee.
