= Amy Rice =

American politician (born 1966)

Amy G. Rice

Member of the Rhode Island House of Representatives from the 72nd district
- In office 4 January 2005 – 4 January 2011
- Preceded by: Christine H. Callahan (R-72)
- Succeeded by: Daniel P. Reilly

Personal details
- Born: October 1, 1966 (age 60) Newport, Rhode Island
- Party: Democratic
- Children: 1
- Education: University of Rhode Island, Salve Regina University, Suffolk University School of Law
- Profession: Self-employed attorney

Amy G. Rice (born 1966) is an American attorney and former Democratic member of the Rhode Island House of Representatives, representing the 72nd District from 2005 to 2011. She served on the House Committees on Judiciary, and Environment and Natural Resources. On February 11, 2010 she was elected as Deputy Majority Leader of the House of Representatives. Rice was defeated for reelection in 2010 by Daniel Patrick Reilly.
