= Morroni =

Morroni is a surname. Notable people with this surname include:

- Cristiano Morroni (born 1979), Italian actor
- John Morroni (1955–2018), American politician and businessman
- Perle Morroni (born 1997), French football player

== See also ==
- Morrone (disambiguation)
- Moroni
