= Lisa Tomasso =

Member of the Rhode Island House of Representatives

Member of the Rhode Island House of Representatives from the 29th district
- In office January 2011 – January 2015
- Preceded by: Ray Sullivan
- Succeeded by: Sherry Roberts

Personal details
- Born: July 27, 1970 (age 56)
- Party: Democratic
- Education: University of Rhode Island

Lisa P. Tomasso (born July 27, 1970) is an American politician and a Democratic former member of the Rhode Island House of Representatives representing District 29 from January 2011 to January 2015.

== Education ==
Tomasso earned her BA in political science from the University of Rhode Island.

== Elections ==
- 2010 When District 29 Republican Representative Raymond Sullivan left the Legislature and left the seat open, Tomasso ran in the September 23, 2010 Democratic Primary, winning with 632 votes (65.8%) and won the November 2, 2010 General election by 8 votes with 2,739 votes (50.1%) against Republican nominee Gregory Coutcher.
- 2012 Tomasso was unopposed for the September 11, 2012 Democratic Primary, winning with 687 votes and won the November 6, 2012 General election with 3,973 votes (58.4%) against Republican nominee Keith Anderson.
- 2014 Tomasso was unopposed for the September 9, 2014 Democratic Primary, winning with 1081 votes and lost the November 4, 2014 General election with 2,558 votes (47.6%) against Republican nominee Sherry Roberts.
