= Mary Ann Greene =

American lawyer

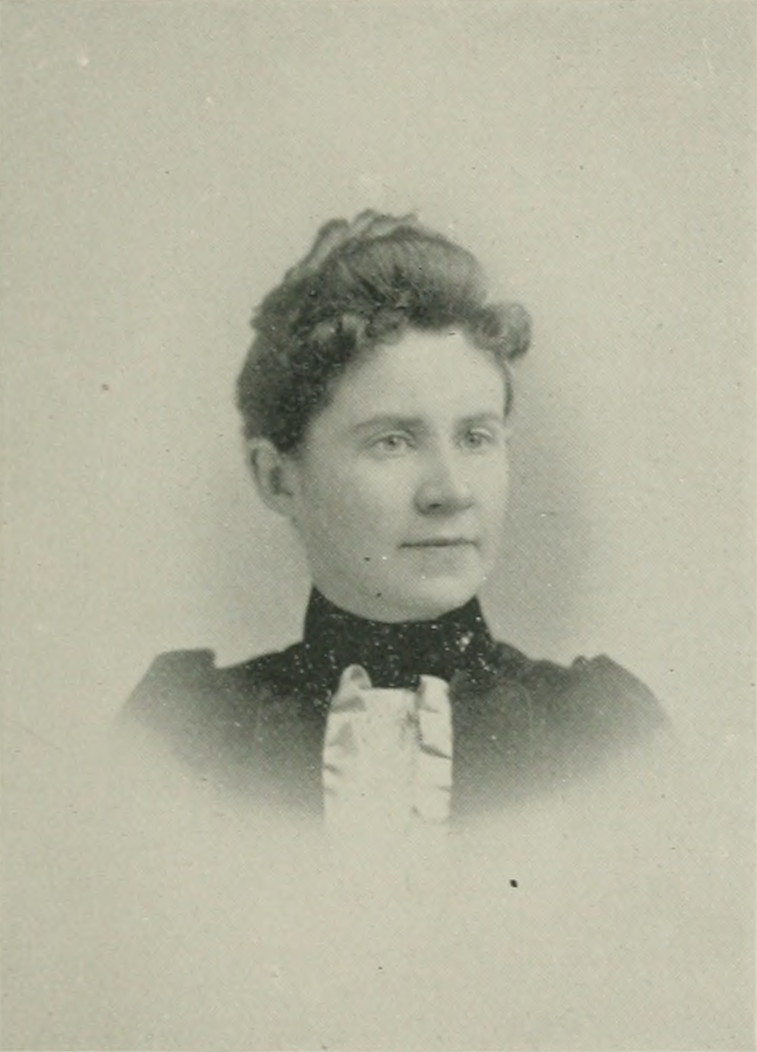
Mary Ann Greene

Mary Ann Greene (June 14, 1857 – 1936) was a 19th-century American lawyer, writer, and lecturer from Rhode Island. She was the first American woman to be invited to address the World's Congress of Jurisprudence and Law Reform, where she delivered an address upon "Married Women's Property Acts in the United States, and Needed Reforms Therein." She was also the first woman to publish in the American Law Review (1890), and the first woman to argue a case before the Rhode Island Supreme Court (1907). Greene's principal literary works were articles on legal subjects, for magazines and papers, such as The Chautauquan and the American Law Review.

== Early life and education ==
Mary Anne Greene was born in Warwick, Rhode Island, June 14, 1857, the daughter of John Waterman Aborn Greene and Mary Frances (Low) Greene. She was a lineal descendant of Roger Williams, and was of the ninth generation of the Rhode Island family founded by Dr. John Greene, son of Richard Greene, of Bowridge Hill, Gillingham, Dorset, England. John Greene came to Salem, Massachusetts from Salisbury, England, 1635, was one of the original proprietors of Providence, Rhode Island, 1636, and one of the original purchasers and founders of the town of Warwick, in 1642. This family gave to the colony and State a number of public officials, among them a Deputy Governor, John Greene Jr.; a Chief Justice, who sat on the bench of the Court of Common Pleas of Kent County, Rhode Island all through the American Revolution; Philip Greene, an Associate Justice of the Supreme Court of Rhode Island; two colonial Governors, William and William Jr.; and two Revolutionary officers of distinction, General Nathanael Greene and Colonel Christopher Greene, associated with the Battle of Red Bank, was a cousin of General Nathanael Greene.

Greene began the study of law in 1885, in order to be able to manage her own business affairs and to assist other women to do the same. She took the full course of three years in the Boston University School of Law, graduating in 1888 with the degree of Bachelor of Laws, magna cum laude, being the third woman to graduate from the school, and the second to be admitted to the Massachusetts bar.

== Career ==
=== Lawyer ===
Being at once admitted to the Suffolk bar, in Boston, Greene became the second woman member of the Massachusetts bar. After practicing 18 months in Boston, she returned to Rhode Island in 1890, residing in Providence, where she was engaged in writing and lecturing on legal topics. Although she was successful in court practice, her physical frailty left her unable to endure its strain. For that reason, she never applied for admission to the Rhode Island bar, her standing at the Boston bar being sufficient for the kind of work she wanted to do. She engaged in an office practice, focusing largely on conveyancing and the care of estates.

=== Writer ===
In 1892, at the request of the Board of Lady Managers of the World's Columbian Exposition, Greene compiled a pamphlet entitled "Legal Status of Women under the Laws of Rhode Island, 1892." It was originally published in 1893, in Providence in the Rhode Island Woman's Directory for the Columbian Year, edited by Charlotte Field Dailey, for the Rhode Island Woman's World's Fair Advisory Board, of which Greene was a member. In 1900, the laws having been altered and amended, she revised the pamphlet, and it was published by the Rhode Island State Federation of Women's Clubs under the title, "Legal Status of Women in Rhode Island, 1900," with a preface concerning the sweeping legislation for the benefit of Rhode Island wives.

Greene was the first woman contributor to the American Law Review. Some of her published articles were: "Privileged Communications in suits between Husband and Wife," American Law Review, September–October, 1890; "The Evolution of the American Fee Simple," American Law Review, March–April, 1897; "Results of the Woman Suffrage Movement," Forum, June, 1894; and a series of articles on law for women in The Chautauquan, November, 1891-August, 1892.

Greene assisted in preparing the fifth edition of James Schouler's Domestic Relations, the standard authority in the courts upon that branch of law. Greene's address at the World's Congress of Jurisprudence upon "Married Woman's Property Acts in the United States, and Needed Reforms therein," was published in the Chicago Legal News of August 12; 1893. Her address delivered, in the Woman's Building of the Columbian Exposition, entitled "Legal Condition of Women in 1492 and 1892," was printed in full in the official volumes of the Congresses in the Woman's Building. In the New England Magazine for 1898, her illustrated article on General Nathanael Greene appeared as a brief biography tracing the development of General Greene's character and attempting to show what it was that made him a military genius.

The Woman's Baptist Foreign Missionary Society published two small pamphlets written by Greene: "The Primer of Missions" in 1896 and "Women's Missionary Wills and Bonds" in 1902. Greene said, "If I get interested in any subject, legal, patriotic, or missionary, I have to deliver addresses and publish articles about it."

In 1902, Greene published "The Woman's Manual of Law," a clear, simple, and nontechnical book of reference for women who desired to inform themselves as to the laws of business and of the domestic relations. The Chicago Legal News of November 8, 1902, said of it:— "This book is the result of years of experience of Greene, a member of the Boston bar, as lecturer upon the subject of which it treats. . . . The entire cycle of a woman's life, from her marriage to the grave, is passed in review in successive chapters. First, the laws affecting the domestic relations are considered. Then follow those dealing with buying and selling and the care of all kinds of property. In every case the particular legal restrictions upon the powers of the woman who is married are considered. Lastly, the proper disposition of property by will and by the laws of inheritance is treated, including the rights of the widow or the widower in the property of either. Miss Greene has shown good judgment, not only in the selection of her subjects treated, but in her manner of treating them. Her style is pleasing and easily understood. Every woman who can read the English language, and wishes to know her legal rights, should have this manual of Miss Greene's for a companion. The gifted author tells us, while all the laws discussed in this volume are of equal importance to men, it is entitled 'The Woman's Manual of Law' because it is a selection of laws that women especially need to know."

Among Greene's literary accomplishments were a translation from the French of Dr. Louis Frank's essay, "The Woman Lawyer". The translation appeared serially in the "Chicago Law Times" for the year 1889. Dr. Frank dedicated to Greene his Cati'chisme de la Femme in 1895. This work was translated into nearly every language of Continental Europe.

=== Lecturer ===
Greene was a regular lecturer of business law for women in Lasell Seminary (now Lasell College), in Auburndale, Massachusetts, the first women's school to give systematic instruction in the principles of law. As a public speaker, Greene was very successful, speaking without notes. At the 40th anniversary of the first woman's rights convention, celebrated in Boston in January, 1891, Greene was invited to speak for "Women in Law" as the representative of that profession. She was not, however, identified in any way with the women's suffrage movement. She believed that her mission was to educate women regarding the rights they possess, and that others would work on demanding further rights for women.

=== Organizer ===
Greene was commissioned by the Governor of Rhode Island chairman of the Rhode Island Committee on a Colonial Exhibit at the Atlanta Exposition; and the Legislature, upon her sole petition as chairman, appropriated US$1,000 for the colonial exhibit. This is said to be the first time in history that State funds were placed in the control of a commission composed exclusively of women, by a direct grant to them from the Legislature itself.

Since 1898, Greene served a vice-president of the Woman's Baptist Foreign Missionary Society. In January, 1902, she was, by formal vote of the Board of Directors, made its authorized legal adviser. From 1895, she was president of the Woman's Baptist Foreign Missionary Society of Rhode Island, a State branch of the general society.

At the 40th Anniversary of the first Woman's Rights Convention she represented women in the legal profession. The meeting, presided over by Lucy Stone, was held in Tremont Temple, January 27, 1891, and Greene spoke on "Women in the Law". She was State Regent for Rhode Island of the Daughters of the American Revolution from 1895 to 1897, and later became an Honorary State Regent.

== Personal life ==
Greene was a member of the Baptist Church. She died in 1936.

== See also ==
- List of first women lawyers and judges in Rhode Island
