= Edward F. Holland =

American politician

Member of the Rhode Island Senate from the 6th district
- In office January 3, 1995 – January 7, 1997
- Preceded by: Walter J. Gray
- Succeeded by: V. Susan Sosnowski

Personal details
- Born: 1930 or 1931
- Died: May 19, 2015 (aged 83–84) Westview Health Care Center, West Warwick
- Party: Democratic
- Spouse: Eleanor Q. Webster
- Children: 0 children together. He had 3 children and 3 step children.

Edward F. Holland (1931 or 1932 – May 19, 2015) was an American politician who served as a Democratic member of the Rhode Island Senate who represented the 6th Senate district, encompassing South Kingstown and New Shoreham from 1995 to 1997.

== Political career ==
Holland was first elected to the state senate in 1994, beating Republican nominee R. Harold Thomas following the retirement of incumbent senator Walter J. Gray. Holland won the election with 3,345 votes, or 52.6% of the vote.

Holland won unopposed in the 1996 Democratic primary, winning 629 votes, but was defeated in the November 5, 1996, general election by Republican Susan Sosnowksi, with only 3,337 votes (45%) to her 4,066 votes (55%).

== Personal life ==
Holland was a cartographer for the Defense Mapping Agency, now part of the National Geospatial Intelligence Agency for 37 years. Holland was married to Eleanor Q. Webster and together they had 3 children. Holland also raised 3 step-children.

Holland died in his sleep on May 19, 2015, at the Westview Health Care Center in West Warwick at the age of 84.
