= Thomas J. Paolino =

American judge (1905–1987)

Thomas Joseph Paolino (December 4, 1905 – April 18, 1987) was an Italian-American Justice of the Rhode Island Supreme Court from 1956 to 1977. Paolino was born in Providence and graduated from Brown University and Harvard Law School.

Paolino was the leader of the Republican Party in Rhode Island,which included being a floor manager for Dwight D. Eisenhower. He was the Republican nominee in the 1936 Secretary of State of Rhode Island election, losing to Louis W. Cappelli, and a Republican nominee for Congress in the 1948 United States House of Representatives elections, losing to John E. Fogarty.

He went on to earn honorary degrees from Bryant University, St. Francis College, Suffolk University, and Salve Regina University.

Political offices
Preceded by Antonio A. Capotosto	Justice of the Rhode Island Supreme Court; 1956–1977	Succeeded by Joseph R. Weisberger
