= Maureen McKenna Goldberg =

American judge (born 1951)

Justice of the Rhode Island Supreme Court
- In office May 3, 1997 – March 27, 2026
- Appointed by: Lincoln Almond
- Preceded by: Florence K. Murray
- Succeeded by: Vacant

Personal details
- Born: Maureen McKenna; February 11, 1951 (age 75) Pawtucket, Rhode Island, U.S.
- Spouse: Robert D. Goldberg
- Education: Providence College (BA); Suffolk University (JD)

Maureen McKenna Goldberg (born February 11, 1951) is an American jurist who served as a justice of the Rhode Island Supreme Court.

== Education ==
Goldberg attended St. Mary Academy – Bay View, a college preparatory school in Riverside, Rhode Island, where she graduated from in 1969. She went on to receive her undergraduate education from Providence College, graduating in 1973. Goldberg is a 1978 graduate of Suffolk University Law School in Boston

== Career ==
Goldberg was an Assistant Attorney General in the Criminal Division from 1978 to 1984. She served as South Kingstown Town Solicitor from 1985 to 1987 and as Westerly Town Solicitor from 1987 to 1990. In 1990, Goldberg served as Acting Town Manager of Westerly.

From July 1990 to May 1997, Goldberg served as an associate justice of the Rhode Island Superior Court. In 1997, she was appointed by Governor Lincoln Almond to serve on the Rhode Island Supreme Court.

== Personal life ==
Goldberg is married to Robert D. Goldberg, a lobbyist and former Republican leader in the Rhode Island Senate.

Legal offices
Preceded by Florence K. Murray	Justice of the Rhode Island Supreme Court; 1997–2026	Vacant
