= Ada Lewis Sawyer =

American lawyer

Ada Lewis Sawyer (1892–1985) was an American lawyer. She is remembered as the first woman to take and pass the bar exam in the state of Rhode Island.

== Biography ==
=== Early years ===
Ada Lewis Sawyer was born March 3, 1892, in Providence, Rhode Island. She was one of four siblings and the daughter of Mr. and Mrs. Frank Winsor Sawyer. Her father was a salesman for an oil company. Her family resided at 50 Pitman Street in Providence during the early years of her life.

Sawyer attended Providence public schools. At age 12, Sawyer graduated from the Federal Street grammar school. In 1909, she was one of four students to receive honors from the English high school, where she and forty others graduated.

The day after graduating, Sawyer was hired by the law office of Charles E. Salisbury and Percy W. Gardner, the office at 75 Westminster Street at this time, as a stenographer. Around a year later, when Gardner separated from his partner and moved into suite 402 in the Turk's Head Building, he brought Ada along as his secretary.

=== First woman to pass the bar ===
When Ada started showing an interest in the law, Percy not only encouraged her to study it, but signed her up for the bar examination in 1917 as A. Sawyer. At this point, no woman in Rhode Island had ever sat for the bar. In order to qualify for the bar, the candidate was required to have graduated from an accredited college or graduate school or have read the law for three years. As Sawyer had not attended law school, she was signed up as a clerk for Gardner.

In 1920, Sawyer was ready to sit for the bar exam. It was only when one of the bar's examiners realized that A. Sawyer was really a female that an argument was made that the noun "person" used in the bar rules was meant to apply to men but not to women. After the Rhode Island Supreme Court debated this case, Justice Sweetland made the famous finding that the term "person" includes a woman, an important finding as women then still did not have full legal rights, such as the right to vote:

"After consideration we are of the opinion that the word "person" contained in the rules regulating the admission of attorneys and counselors should be construed to include a woman as well as a man; and that the masculine pronoun "he" contained in the rules should be construed to include the feminine "she."

"We would therefore say in answer to the question of the board that 'it can permit a woman to take the examinations for admission to the bar, she complying with all the necessary qualifications and conditions applicable, under the rules of the court, to men.'"

On September 24, 1920, Sawyer took the bar examination. Her dedication and hard work paid off, as she was the first woman in the state of Rhode Island to take and successfully complete the bar examination. Upon discovering she had passed the bar on November 10, 1920, the Providence Journal called her their "Providence Portia". Her accomplishment is even more admirable, considering that Sawyer had not had the law school education that most of the other bar candidates had had. She not only passed the bar, but she scored high out of the twelve to pass the bar. Only these, 12 of the 22 candidates passed the bar during that sitting. In 1925, Ada was admitted to practice before the Supreme Court. Of the 11 attorneys being sworn in, she was the only woman.

Rhode Island was one of the last states to admit women to the bar. Even with the progress Sawyer made for women, it was not until 1974 that the number of woman lawyers in Rhode Island really increased. In fact, Sawyer was the only woman lawyer in Rhode Island for quite some time. Ada believed that this was because Percy kept a position aside for her and helped her study for the bar, unlike most other women who might have wanted to have become lawyers.

=== Career ===
Once Ada Sawyer successfully completed the bar exam, she became a lawyer in the office of Percy Gardner in the Turks Head Building. Percy had the sign replaced to read "Gardner and Sawyer". It was only with the addition of two younger male attorneys that the sign was changed to "Gardner, Sawyer, Gates & Sloan". Once the sign included Sawyer's name, she worked for another 63 years at the office, in suite 402.

Sawyer's cases included all trust estates, corporations, and probate cases. In 1921, Sawyer landed her first case before a court, RI Hospital Trust Co v. Herbert C. Calef.

For women entering the law, Ada Sawyer was quoted as saying, "If a woman has an aptitude for this kind of work she has just as great opportunity to succeed as a lawyer as she would have in any other profession."

Sawyer was known as a hard-working and highly competent attorney. The little time she wasn't working she spent at her home on the East Side of Providence, at 47 S. Angell Street, or at her summer home in Point Judith, where she enjoyed boat rides.

In 1955, the man who helped Sawyer enter the world of law, Percy Gardner, died, thus ending their partnership.

=== Awards and organizations ===
Miss Sawyer was the President of the Providence Altrusa Club and executive secretary of the Children's Laws Commission. Miss Sawyer was also President of the RI State Federation of Women's Clubs, and a member of the Women's Republican Clubs, and active as lecturer and legal adviser to the Four Leaf Clover Club, the Providence Plantations Club, and the Gaspe Chapter of the Daughters of the American Revolution.

Sawyer was a member of the Wakefield Area Advisory Board of the Industrial National Bank, and a director of half a dozen other RI corporations. She was a corporation member of the Rhode Island Hospital, Bethany Home of RI, Hattie Ide Chaffee Home, and director of RI Tuberculosis and Health Association. During this time, Ada Sawyer became friends with Mrs. Sweetland, Judge Sweetland's wife, who was also active in some of the organizations listed above.

In the Women's Republican Club, Sawyer drafted a bill for the appointment of a Code Commission to help reform the labor laws of the state with regard to minors. This draft became a law several weeks later.

In 2000, the annual Rhode Island Woman's Bar Association Award for Excellence was named in Ada Sawyer's honor. Judge Haiganush Bedrosian (Warwick) was the first recipient of the Ada Sawyer Award.

In June 1964, Brown University awarded the 72-year-old Sawyer an honorary degree. In 1977, she received another honorary degree from Roger Williams College and a Rhode Island Women's bar honorary degree in 1978. She also received awards from the state chapter of the Federation of Business and Professional Women in 1979. In 1975, a scholarship in her name at Harvard University Law School was established by a friend, Jean Richmond.

=== Later years ===
Sawyer thought she would never retire, saying, "I'll take time off from work once in a while but I don't think I'll ever retire". Even a stroke in 1979 did not stop Ada from practicing the law; she had a driver bring her to and from work and used a cane when necessary. But in 1983, Sawyer retired at the age of 91. She remained close to her sister Bertha at this time as they still shared a house and also enjoyed time at her home in Point Judith.

After only two years of retirement, Sawyer died on May 14, 1985, at 93 years old.

== See also ==
- List of first women lawyers and judges in Rhode Island

== Other sources ==
- Martin J. Funke, "Ada Lewis Sawyer, 93, Dies: First Woman Lawyer in R.I.." Providence Journal Bulletin, May 14, 1985, section C, pg. 2.
- "Code Commission Picks Miss Sawyer for Its Secretary." Evening Bulletin, April 17, 1925, pg. 1.
- "First Woman Lawyer to be Admitted to State's Bar." Providence Journal, November 14, 1920, pg. 2.
- "Group to Resume Activities with Supper-Meeting Thursday Night." Providence Journal, September 8, 1935, pg. 5.
