= Thomas Winfield =

American politician

Member of the Rhode Island House of Representatives from the 53rd district
- In office January 2003 – January 2019
- Preceded by: Nicholas Gorham
- Succeeded by: Bernard Hawkins

Member of the Rhode Island House of Representatives from the 69th district
- In office January 1993 – January 2003
- Preceded by: Mark Dailey
- Succeeded by: Raymond Gallison

Personal details
- Born: June 15, 1963 (age 63) Providence, Rhode Island
- Party: Democratic
- Education: Providence College; Mount Ida College

Thomas J. Winfield (born June 15, 1963 in Providence, Rhode Island) is an American politician and a Democratic member of the Rhode Island House of Representatives representing District 53 since January 2003. Winfield served consecutively from January 1993 until January 2003 in the District 69 seat.

== Education ==
Winfield attended Providence College and graduated from Mount Ida College.

== Elections ==
- 2012 Winfield was unopposed for the September 11, 2012 Democratic Primary, winning with 485 votes and won the November 6, 2012 General election, winning with 3,875 votes (63.0%) against Republican nominee David Bibeault, who had challenged Winfield in 1994, 1996, and 1998.
- 1992 When District 69 Democratic Representative Mark Dailey left the Legislature and left the seat open, Winfield won the September 15, 1992 Democratic Primary and won the four-way November 3, 1992 General election with 2,024 votes (47.3%) against Republican nominee Thomas Daniels and Independents James Haigh and Stephen Kapalka.
- 1994 Winfield was unopposed for the September 13, 1994 Democratic Primary and won the three-way November 8, 1994 General election with 2,008 votes (56.1%) against Republican nominee James Barden and Independent candidate David Bibeault.
- 1996 Winfield was unopposed for the September 10, 1996 Democratic Primary and won the three-way November 5, 1996 General election against Republican nominee Genevieve Dionne and returning 1994 Independent challenger David Bibeault.
- 1998 Winfield was unopposed for the September 15, 1998 Democratic Primary, winning with 266 votes and won the three-way November 3, 1998 General election with 1,946 votes (58.3%) against Republican nominee Jean Dionne and returning 1994 and 1996 opponent David Bibeault, running as the Libertarian candidate.
- 2000 Winfield was unopposed for the September 12, 2000 Democratic Primary, winning with 408 votes and won the November 7, 2000 General election with 2,816 votes (65.2%) against Republican nominee Richard Mandeville.
- 2002 Redistricted to District 53, and with incumbent Representative Nicholas Gorham redistricted to District 40, Winfield and 2000 Republican challenger Richard Mandeville were both unopposed for their September 10, 2002 primaries, setting up a rematch; Winfield won the November 5, 2002 General election with 2,813 votes (61.2%) against Mandeville.
- 2004 Winfield was challenged in the September 14, 2004 Democratic Primary, winning with 112 votes (95.7%) and won the November 2, 2004 General election with 3,230 votes (61.3%) against Republican nominee Andrew Lyon.
- 2006 Winfield was challenged in the September 12, 2006 Democratic Primary, winning with 489 votes (68.4%) and the November 7, 2006 General election, winning with 3,818 votes (70.2%) against Republican nominee John English.
- 2008 Winfield and returning 2006 Republican challenger John English were both unopposed for their September 9, 2008 primaries, setting up a rematch; Winfield won the November 4, 2008 General election with 3,028 votes (60.3%) against English.
- 2010 Winfield and returning 2008 and 2010 Republican challenger John English were again both unopposed for their September 23, 2010 primaries, setting up their third contest; Winfield won the November 2, 2010 General election with 3,939 votes (65.1%) against English.
