= Moira Walsh =

American politician (born 1990)

Member of the Rhode Island House of Representatives from the 3rd district
- In office January 3, 2017 – January 5, 2021
- Preceded by: Thomas Palangio
- Succeeded by: Nathan Biah

Personal details
- Born: October 27, 1990 (age 36) Providence, Rhode Island, U.S.
- Party: Democratic
- Children: One son
- Occupation: Waitress; Labor organizer

Moira Jayne Walsh (born October 27, 1990) is an American activist and politician who represented the 3rd district in the Rhode Island House of Representatives from 2017 to 2021. Walsh is a member of the Democratic Party.

== Early life ==
Walsh was born August 23, 1990. She was raised in the Providence neighborhood of Smith Hill and attended Classical High School, a public magnet school in Providence. After high school, she became a waitress. In 2014, she became involved with the Restaurant Opportunities Center after a coworker brought her to an organizing meeting and became involved in the movement to increase the tipped worker minimum wage from $2.89 per hour to $3.89 per hour. During this period, she also attended Rhode Island College and Community College of Rhode Island.

== Rhode Island House of Representatives ==
=== Elections ===
==== 2016 ====
Walsh ran against incumbent Democrat Thomas Palangio after speaking with the Rhode Island state chapter of Jobs with Justice. During the election, she was endorsed by the Working Families Party. She defeated Palangio in the Democratic primary, 51.80% to 48.20%, and was unopposed in the general election.

==== 2018 ====
Walsh drew national attention when she and three other incumbent legislators did not receive the endorsement of the Rhode Island Democratic Party. The Party initially endorsed her primary challenger, Michael Earnheart, who was revealed to have supported Republican Donald Trump in the 2016 presidential election and to have been registered to vote as a Republican in at least three previous elections. They later withdrew the endorsement of Earnheart and decided to not endorse either candidate. Walsh received the endorsement of U.S. Rep. David Cicilline, who represents Rhode Island's 1st congressional district. Walsh went on to win the 2018 Democratic Primary against Earnheart, receiving 55% of the vote to Earnheart's 45%. Following her primary win, Walsh was again unopposed in the 2018 general election.

==== 2020 ====
In 2020, Walsh lost the Democratic primary to challenger Nathan Biah by a 65-35 margin.

=== Tenure ===
Walsh was sworn into office on January 3, 2017. She was assigned to the Committee on Health, Education and Welfare and Committee on Veterans' Affairs. She has made improving working conditions for tipped workers as key part of her legislative agenda. She has also advocated for the liberalization of drug laws.

In March 2017, her criticism of legislators consuming alcohol on the House floor during session made national headlines. While at the time she walked back some of the comments, "saying she had only been referring to cocktail parties and fundraisers", she later said the fallout was "one of [her] proudest accomplishments, ...that they had to be secret" about drinking in the chamber.

=== Committee assignments ===
For the 2017–2018 legislative session Walsh served on the Committee on Health, Education, and Welfare and the Veterans' Affairs committee.

In the 2019–2020 session, Walsh served on the House Committee on Environment and Natural Resources, and was also a founding member of the Rhode Island House's Reform Caucus.
