= Florence K. Murray =

American judge

Florence Kerins Murray (October 21, 1916 – March 28, 2004) was a high-ranking officer in the Women's Army Corps, the first female state senator in Rhode Island, the first female judge in Rhode Island and the first female member of the Rhode Island Supreme Court.

== Early life ==
Florence Kerins was born in Newport, Rhode Island, on October 21, 1916, the daughter of John X. and Florence MacDonald Kerins. She was of Irish American ancestry and was a member of the Roman Catholic Church. She was a graduate of Rogers High School in Newport, and Syracuse University in New York. She graduated from Boston University law school in 1942. She was married on October 21, 1943, to Paul F. Murray, who died in 1995, and they had one son, Paul M. Murray, who lives in Jamestown, RI.

== World War II service ==
Murray was commissioned as an officer in the Women's Army Corps during the Second World War and rose to the rank of lieutenant colonel, the youngest woman to achieve that rank at that time. She served on the staff of the Director of the Women's Army Corps, Colonel Oveta Hobby, in Washington, D.C.

She was discharged from the Army in 1947. For her military service she was awarded the Legion of Merit, the Army Commendation Medal, the Women's Army Corps Service Medal, the American Campaign Medal and the World War Two Victory Medal.

== Political career ==
After the war, she was elected as a Democrat to the Rhode Island state senate and served from 1949 to 1956. She was the first woman to serve as a state senator in Rhode Island. She was a delegate to the Democratic National Convention in 1952.

== Judicial career ==
In 1956, she was the first woman appointed as a Superior Court judge in Rhode Island. In 1978, she was appointed Chief Justice of the Rhode Island Superior Court.

In November 1979, she was elected by the Rhode Island General Assembly as an associate justice of the Rhode Island Supreme Court. She was the first female supreme court justice in Rhode Island. She retired from the court in 1996 after having served as a judge for 40 years.

== Honors ==
Murray received the Silver Shingle Award from Boston University School of Law.

She was inducted into the Rhode Island Heritage Hall of Fame in 1980.

== Death and burial ==
She died at her home in Newport on March 28, 2004, and is buried with her husband in Trinity Cemetery in Portsmouth, Rhode Island.

== Legacy ==
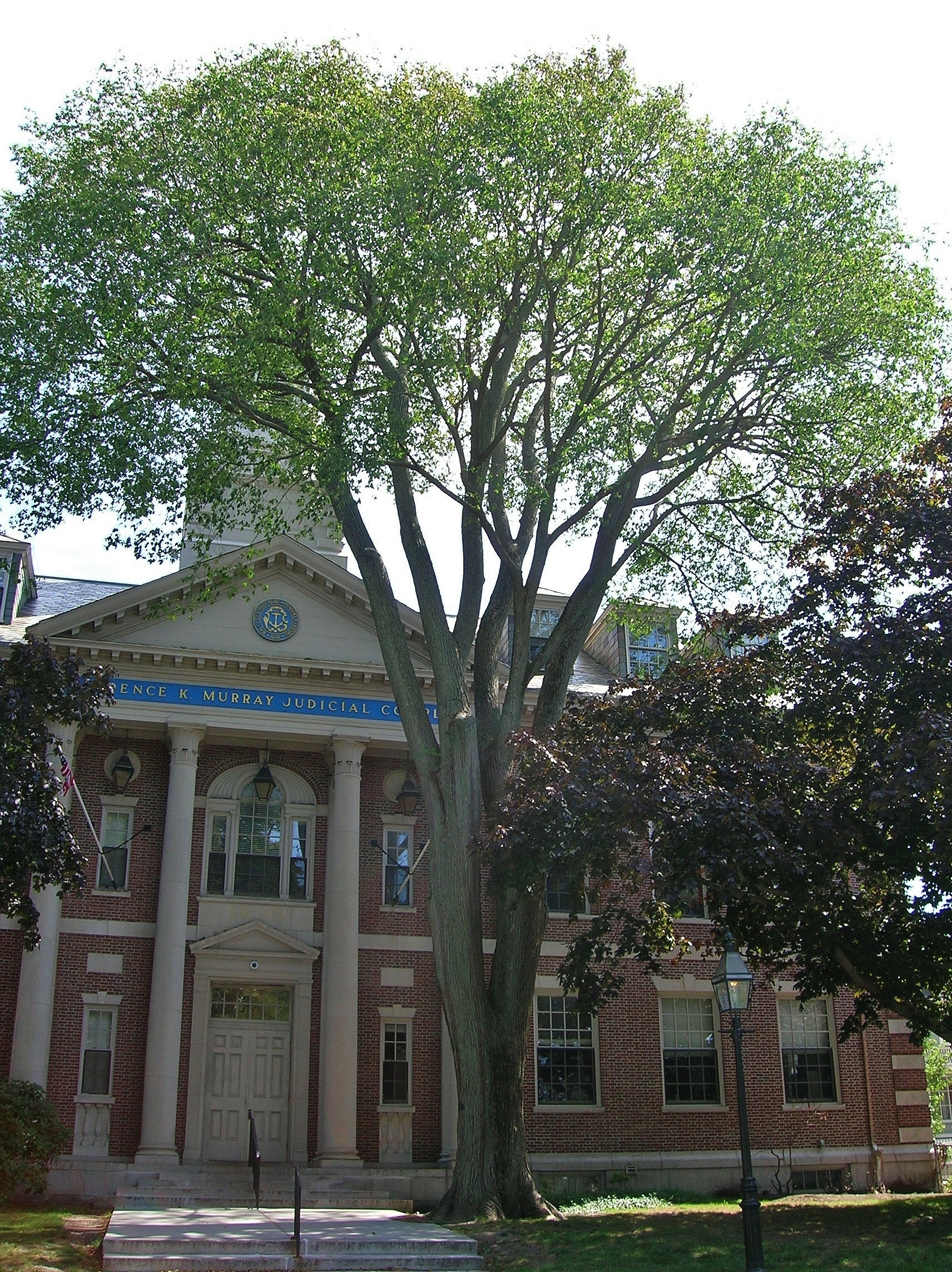
An elm tree stands in front of the Florence K. Murray Courthouse in Newport, RI

The Florence K. Murray award of the National Association of Women Judges is named after her. The award is presented to a non-judge who has influenced women to pursue legal careers, opened doors for women attorneys, or advanced opportunities for women within the legal profession.

The Rhode Island Bar Association established a Florence K. Murray Award in her honor.

The Newport County Courthouse was renamed the Florence K. Murray Judicial Complex in 1990, the first time a courthouse in the United States was named in honor of a female jurist. There is a full length, life-sized portrait of Justice Murray in the courthouse.

== See also ==
- List of female state supreme court justices
- List of first women lawyers and judges in Rhode Island
