= Agostinho Silva =

American politician

Agostinho F. Silva

Member of the Rhode Island House of Representatives from the 56th district
- In office 2 January 2007 – 6 January 2015
- Preceded by: Joseph L. Faria (D-56)
- Succeeded by: Shelby Maldonado

Personal details
- Born: November 5, 1963 (age 62)
- Party: Democratic
- Spouse: Filomena
- Children: Agostinho, Jr. Luiz; Nelson; Sofia
- Education: Community College of Rhode Island

Agostinho F. Silva (born November 5, 1963) is an American politician who is a Democratic member of the Rhode Island House of Representatives, representing the 56th District from 2007 to 2015. As a representative, Silva served on the House Committees on Finance, and Rules. Silva chose not to seek reelection in 2014, and was succeeded by Shelby Maldonado.
