= Walter J. Gray =

American politician (1928–2024)

Member of the Rhode Island Senate from the 6th district
- In office January 1, 1991 – January 3, 1995
- Preceded by: Robert D. Goldberg
- Succeeded by: Edward F. Holland

Member of the South Kingstown Town Council
- In office 1971–1975

Personal details
- Born: January 16, 1928 Woonsocket, Rhode Island, U.S.
- Died: June 23, 2024 (aged 96) Wakefield, Rhode Island, U.S.
- Party: Republican (1994–2024)
- Other political affiliations: Democrat (before 1994)
- Children: 2
- Education: Boston University (BS)

Walter J. Gray (February 16, 1928 – June 23, 2024) was an American politician who served as a member of the Rhode Island Senate who represented the 6th Senate district which encompassed South Kingstown and New Shoreham, and briefly encompassing Exeter until it was redistricted to the 41st Senate district in 1992. Gray served from 1991 to 1995.

== Political career ==
Gray was elected to the South Kingstown Town Council in 1971 and re-elected in 1973. He served until 1975.

Gray was first elected to serve as a senator in 1990, running as the Democratic nominee, defeating incumbent Senator Robert Goldberg in the November 6, 1990 general election, with 3,672 votes (50.8%) to Goldberg's 3,551 votes (49.2%). Gray was reelected in 1992, running unopposed in the November 6, 1992 general election, receiving 4,809 votes. Gray did not run for reelection in 1994, and was succeeded by Edward F. Holland.

Gray served as a member of the Judiciary Committee, the Labor Committee, and the Joint Committee on Environmental and Energy.

== Personal life and death ==
Gray attended Boston University and graduated with Bachelor of Science.

He worked at the University of Rhode Island for 30 years, where he worked as the Director of Division of Marine Resources. He won the award for Administrative Excellence in 1978.

Gray had two children. He died in Wakefield, Rhode Island on June 23, 2024, at the age of 96.
