= Jeremiah O'Grady =

Member of the Rhode Island House of Representatives

Jay O'Grady

Member of the Rhode Island House of Representatives from the 46th district
- In office January 2011 – January 2019
- Preceded by: Mary Ann Shallcross Smith
- Succeeded by: John “Jack” Lyle Jr.

Personal details
- Born: June 30, 1970 (age 56)
- Party: Democratic
- Education: University of Vermont; University of Rhode Island

Jeremiah T. “Jay” O'Grady (born June 30, 1970) is an American politician and a Democratic member of the Rhode Island House of Representatives representing District 46 since January 2011.

== Education ==
O'Grady earned his BA from the University of Vermont and his MPA from the University of Rhode Island.

== Elections ==
- 2012 O'Grady was challenged in the September 11, 2012 Democratic Primary winning with 785 votes (64%) against former Representative John Barr and won the four-way November 6, 2012 General election with 2,738 votes (38.5%) against returning 2010 opponents Republican Matthew Guerra, former Representative Mary Ann Shallcross Smith (running as an Independent), and Paul DiDomenico.
- 2010 O'Grady challenged District 46 Representative Shallcross Smith in the September 23, 2010 Democratic Primary, winning by 90 votes with 836 votes (52.8%) and won the four-way November 2, 2010 General election, winning with 2,150 votes (48.9%) against Republican nominee Matthew Guerra and Independent candidates C. Kevin McCarthy and Paul DiDomenico.
