= Peter Palumbo (politician) =

American politician (born 1961)

Member of the Rhode Island House of Representatives from the 16th district
- In office January 2003 – January 6, 2015
- Preceded by: Brian Patrick Kennedy
- Succeeded by: Robert Lancia

Member of the Rhode Island House of Representatives from the 25th district
- In office January 1995 – January 2003
- Succeeded by: Timothy A. Williamson

Personal details
- Born: March 27, 1961 (age 65) Providence, Rhode Island
- Party: Democratic
- Education: Bryant College
- Website: peterpalumbo.com

Peter G. Palumbo (born March 27, 1961, in Providence, Rhode Island) is an American politician and a Democratic member of the Rhode Island House of Representatives representing District 16 since January 2003, until his defeat in 2014. Palumbo served consecutively from January 1995 until January 2003 in the District 25 seat.

Palumbo is perhaps best remembered for his comments regarding Jessica Ahlquist, a high school student who successfully sued to have a prayer removed from her Rhode Island public high school auditorium. On the day following the ruling, Peter Palumbo spoke on a local radio show and referred to Ahlquist as "an evil little thing".

Peter Palumbo was arrested on January 19, 2017, for embezzlement.

== Early life and education ==
Palumbo was born on March 27, 1961 in Providence, Rhode Island. He attended Bryant College.

== Elections ==
Palumbo challenged District 25 incumbent Representative Joseph DeLorenzo in the September 13, 1994, Democratic Primary and was unopposed for the November 8, 1994, General election.

Palumbo was unopposed for both the September 10, 1996, Democratic Primary, winning with 391 votes and the November 5, 1996, General election, winning with 1,778 votes.

Palumbo was unopposed for both the September 15, 1998, Democratic Primary, winning with 502 votes and the November 3, 1998, General election, winning with 1,694 votes.

Palumbo was challenged in the September 12, 2000, Democratic Primary, winning with 626 votes (80.3%) and was unopposed for the November 7, 2000, General election, winning with 1,948 votes.

In 2002, Palumbo was redistricted to District 16, and with incumbent Representative Brian Patrick Kennedy redistricted to District 38, Palumbo was challenged in the September 10, 2002, Democratic Primary, winning with 883 votes (57.2%) and won the November 5, 2002, General election with 3,543 votes (69.9%) against Republican nominee Michael Bilow.

Palumbo was unopposed for the September 14, 2004, Democratic Primary, winning with 214 votes and won the November 2, 2004, General election with 3,397 votes (57.8%) against Republican nominee Michael Imbruglia.

Palumbo was unopposed for both the September 12, 2006, Democratic Primary, winning with 752 votes and the November 7, 2006, General election, winning with 4,485 votes.

Palumbo was challenged in the September 9, 2008, Democratic Primary, winning with 551 votes (61.8%) and won the November 4, 2008, General election with 3,170 votes (54.5%) against Independent Michael McManaman.

Palumbo was unopposed for the September 23, 2010, Democratic Primary, winning with 658 votes, and won the November 2, 2010, General election with 2,620 votes (54.3%) against Republican nominee Donald Botts.

Palumbo was challenged in the September 11, 2012, Democratic Primary, winning with 545 votes (53.3%) and was unopposed for the November 6, 2012, General election, winning with 5,074 votes.
