= Antonio A. Capotosto =

American judge (1879–1962)

Antonio A. Capotosto (1879 – December 3, 1962) was an Italian-American Justice of the Rhode Island Supreme Court from January 1935 to 1956.

Born in Italy, Capotosto's family moved to Boston, Massachusetts, when he was three years old. Capotosto attended Boston English High School, and received an undergraduate degree from Harvard College, followed by a law degree from Harvard Law School. The first Italian-American member of the Rhode Island Bar Association, he became an assistant attorney general. He was appointed to the Rhode Island Superior Court in 1922, and remained there until 1935, when the Democratic Party unexpectedly gained control of the state legislature, and appointed an entirely new state supreme court, including Capostosto. He retired from the court in 1956.

Capotosto married Clementine E. Castiglioni, with whom he had three sons and a daughter. He died at Jane Brown Memorial Hospital in Providence, Rhode Island, at the age of 83.

Political offices
Preceded by Newly reconstituted court	Justice of the Rhode Island Supreme Court; 1935–1956	Succeeded by Thomas J. Paolino
