= Donna Nesselbush =

American politician

Member of the Rhode Island Senate from the 15th district
- In office January 4, 2011 – January 5, 2021
- Preceded by: John F. McBurney III
- Succeeded by: Meghan Kallman

Personal details
- Born: August 9, 1962 (age 63)
- Party: Democratic
- Education: Brown University (BA); Suffolk University (JD)
- Website: Official website

Donna M. Nesselbush (born August 9, 1962) is an American lawyer, judge and politician from Pawtucket, Rhode Island. A Democrat, she served in the Rhode Island Senate, representing the 15th district. She took office on January 4, 2011 and did not seek re-election in 2020.

A graduate of Brown University (class of 1984), Nesselbush worked as executive director of the Rhode Island Coalition Against Domestic Violence from 1984 to 1991. She attended Suffolk University School of Law, earning a Juris Doctor in 1991. In 2012, Nesselbush completed Harvard University's John F. Kennedy School of Government program for Senior Executives in State and Local Government as a David Bohnett LGBTQ Victory Institute Leadership Fellow. A founding partner of the law firm of Marasco & Nesselbush, she has been an active member of the Rhode Island Bar Association, chairing its social security committee. She was appointed an associate municipal court judge in Pawtucket in 2004 and has served since.

In 2010, she declared her candidacy for the 15th district seat in the Rhode Island Senate. Incumbent John F. McBurney III, a fellow Democrat and fellow judge of the Pawtucket municipal court, subsequently announced that he would not be seeking a nineteenth term in office. Nesselbush won both the primary and general elections unopposed.

Nesselbush is openly gay. Nesselbush did not seek re-election in 2020.

== See also ==
- List of first women lawyers and judges in Rhode Island
