= Linda Finn =

Member of the Rhode Island House of Representatives

Member of the Rhode Island House of Representatives from the 72nd district
- In office January 1, 2013 – january 1, 2015
- Preceded by: Daniel Reilly
- Succeeded by: Daniel Reilly

Personal details
- Born: August 13, 1959 (age 67)
- Party: Democratic
- Education: Boston College
- Website: linda-finn.com

Linda Dill Finn (born August 13, 1959) is an American politician and a Democratic member of the Rhode Island House of Representatives representing District 72 from January 1, 2013 until January 1, 2015.

== Education ==
Finn earned her BS in marketing from Boston College.

== Elections ==
- 2012 To challenge District 72 incumbent Republican Representative Daniel Reilly, Finn was unopposed for the September 11, 2012 Democratic Primary, winning with 599 votes and won the November 6, 2012 General election by 100 votes with 3,597 votes (50.6%) against Representative Reilly.
