= Raymond Gallison =

American politician (born 1952)

Ray Gallison

Member of the Rhode Island House of Representatives from the 69th district
- In office January 2003 – May 2016
- Preceded by: Thomas Winfield
- Succeeded by: Susan R. Donovan

Member of the Rhode Island House of Representatives from the 91st district
- In office January 2001 – January 2003
- Preceded by: Lawrence Ferguson
- Succeeded by: District abolished

Personal details
- Born: March 23, 1952 (age 74) Providence, Rhode Island
- Party: Democratic
- Education: Rhode Island College; Southern New England School of Law
- Profession: Attorney

Raymond E. Gallison, Jr. (born March 23, 1952, in Providence, Rhode Island) is an American politician and a former Democratic member of the Rhode Island House of Representatives representing District 69 since January 2003. Gallison served consecutively from January 2001 until January 2016 in the District 91 seat.

Gallison agreed to plead guilty to nine counts brought by the U.S. Attorney's Office related to Fraud, Aggravated Identity Theft, and Tax Charges. According to a press release, "Gallison will admit to the theft of funds from the estate of a deceased individual to which he was appointed executor; theft of funds from a Special Needs Trust established to protect the long-term welfare of a disabled individual to which he was appointed trustee; providing false information on tax documents, including vastly inflating the number of students assisted by a non-profit organization funded by public money while failing to disclose amounts paid by that organization to him; and failure to pay taxes on income derived from his criminal actions." He resigned on May 3, 2016.

== Education ==
Gallison earned his BA from Rhode Island College and his JD from the Southern New England School of Law (since closed).

== Elections ==
- 2000 When District 91 Democratic Representative Lawrence Ferguson left the Legislature and left the seat open, Gallison was unopposed for the September 12, 2000 Democratic Primary, winning with 282 votes and won the November 7, 2000 General election with 2,156 votes (65.7%) against Republican nominee Joyce Bryant.
- 2002 Redistricted to District 69, and with incumbent Democratic Representative Thomas Winfield redistricted to District 53, Gallison and returning 2000 Republican opponent Joyce Bryant were both unopposed for their September 10, 2002 primaries, setting up a rematch; Gallison won the November 5, 2002 General election with 2,270 votes (61.3%) against Bryant.
- 2004 Gallison was unopposed for the September 14, 2004 Democratic Primary, winning with 177 votes and won the November 2, 2004 General election with 3,432 votes (67.6%) against Republican nominee Michael Smith.
- 2006 Gallison was unopposed for the September 12, 2006 Democratic Primary, winning with 565 votes and won the November 7, 2006 General election with 2,684 votes (57.2%) against Republican nominee Spencer Maguire.
- 2008 Gallison was unopposed for the September 9, 2008 Democratic Primary, winning with 277 votes and November 4, 2008, General election with 3,764 votes (69.1%) against Republican nominee William Grapentine.
- 2010 Gallison and returning 2008 Republican challenger William Grapentine were both unopposed for their September 23, 2010 primaries, setting up a rematch; Gallison won the November 2, 2010 General election with 2,773 votes (66.2%) against Grapentine.
- 2012 Gallison was unopposed for both the September 11, 2012 Democratic Primary, winning with 703 votes and the November 6, 2012 General election, winning with 4,130 votes.
