= Jared Nunes =

Member of the Rhode Island House of Representatives

Member of the Rhode Island House of Representatives from the 25th district
- In office January 2011 – January 1, 2019
- Preceded by: Timothy A. Williamson
- Succeeded by: Thomas Noret

Personal details
- Born: August 11, 1982 (age 44)
- Party: Democratic
- Education: University of Rhode Island

Jared R. Nunes (born August 11, 1982) is an American politician and a Democratic member of the Rhode Island House of Representatives representing District 25 since January 2011.

== Education ==
Nunes earned his BS degree from the University of Rhode Island.

== Elections ==
- 2012 Nunes was unopposed for both the September 11, 2012 Democratic Primary, winning with 460 votes and the November 6, 2012 General election with 3,340 votes.
- 2010 When District 25 Democratic Representative Timothy A. Williamson retired and left the seat open, Nunes ran in the September 23, 2010 Democratic Primary, winning by 14 votes with 408 votes (50.9%) and won the November 2, 2010 General election, winning by 74 votes with 1,615 votes (51.2%) against Republican nominee Giovanni Calise.
