= J. Jerome Hahn =

American judge (1868–1938)

J. Jerome Hahn (August 20, 1868 – December 6, 1938) was a justice of the Rhode Island Supreme Court from 1931 to 1935.

Born in Albany, New York, Hahn received an LL.B. from Boston University School of Law in 1889. He moved to Providence, Rhode Island, where he entered the practice of law and became "especially noted as an authority on the bankruptcy laws". He was appointed to a seat on the Rhode Island Superior Court in 1919, and elevated to the state supreme court in 1931, to a seat vacated by the death of Chester W. Barrows.

Hahn died at his home in Providence at the age of 70, "after a sickness of several weeks".

Political offices
Preceded by Chester W. Barrows	Justice of the Rhode Island Supreme Court; 1931–1935	Succeeded by Court reconstituted
