= Thomas Palangio =

Member of the Rhode Island House of Representatives

Member of the Rhode Island House of Representatives from the 3rd district
- In office January 1, 2013 – January 3, 2017
- Preceded by: Edith Ajello
- Succeeded by: Moira Walsh

Member of the Rhode Island House of Representatives from the 8th district
- In office January 1993 – 2002
- Preceded by: Armand Batastini
- Succeeded by: Steven M. Costantino

Personal details
- Born: June 14, 1962 (age 64) Providence, Rhode Island, U.S.
- Party: Democratic
- Education: Community College of Rhode Island; Rhode Island College

Thomas A. Palangio (born June 14, 1962 in Providence, Rhode Island) is an American politician and was a Democratic member of the Rhode Island House of Representatives representing District 3 from 2013 to 2017 and District 8 from 1993 until 2002.

== Education ==
Palangio attended the Community College of Rhode Island and graduated from Rhode Island College.

== Elections ==
- 2012 When District 3 Democratic Representative Edith Ajello was redistricted to District 1, Palangio was unopposed for the September 11, 2012 Democratic Primary, winning with 399 votes and won the November 6, 2012 General election with 2,710 votes (91.2%) against Republican nominee Rufus Bailey.
- 1992 Palangio won the September 15, 1992 Democratic Primary and won the November 3, 1992 General election with 2,853 votes (86.2%) against Republican nominee Thomas Shola.
- 1994 Palangio was challenged in the September 13, 1994 Democratic Primary, but won, and was unopposed for the November 8, 1994 General election, winning with 2,312 votes.
- 1996 Palangio was unopposed for both the September 10, 1996 Democratic Primary and the November 5, 1996 General election, winning with 2,312 votes.
- 1998 Palangio was unopposed for both the September 15, 1998 Democratic Primary and the November 3, 1998 General election, winning with 2,312 votes.
- 2000 Palangio was unopposed for both the September 12, 2000 Democratic Primary, winning with 529 votes and the November 7, 2000 General election, winning with 2,225 votes.
