= Robert D. Goldberg =

American politician

Member of the Rhode Island Senate
- In office 1983–1991
- Succeeded by: Walter J. Gray

Personal details
- Born: July 23, 1951 (age 75) Providence, Rhode Island, U.S.
- Party: Republican
- Spouse: Maureen McKenna Goldberg
- Education: George Washington University; University of Tulsa College of Law

Robert D. Goldberg (born July 23, 1951) is an American politician. He served as a Republican member of the Rhode Island Senate.

== Life and career ==
Goldberg was born in Providence, Rhode Island. He attended George Washington University and the University of Tulsa College of Law.

Goldberg served in the Rhode Island Senate from 1983 to 1991.
