= Edward Morrone =

American politician

Edward Morrone is an American politician who was a Senator in the State of Rhode Island representing the 51st District.
