= Edith Ajello =

American politician (born 1944)

Member of the Rhode Island House of Representatives from the 1st district
- Incumbent
- Assumed office January 1, 2013
- Preceded by: John McCauley

Member of the Rhode Island House of Representatives from the 3rd district
- In office January 5, 1993 – January 1, 2013
- Preceded by: Ray Rickman
- Succeeded by: Thomas Palangio

Personal details
- Born: April 26, 1944 (age 82) Fanwood, New Jersey, U.S.
- Party: Democratic
- Education: Bucknell University
- Profession: Retail Store Manager
- Website: edithajello.org

Edith H. Ajello (born April 26, 1944) is an American politician and retail store manager. A Democrat, she has served in the Rhode Island House of Representatives since 1993, representing District 1 since 2013, and District 3 from 1993 to 2013. She is also store manager for Rustigan Rugs, an oriental rug outlet in Providence.

== Early life ==
Ajello was born in 1944 in Fanwood, New Jersey. She earned her BA in psychology from Bucknell University in neighboring Pennsylvania.

== Career ==
Ajello works as a store manager for V. George Rustigian Rugs in Providence, Rhode Island, and also serves on the boards of the Women's Health & Education Fund, The Coalition to Preserve Choice, and the Mile of History Association (MoHa).

== Elections ==
- 1992 Ajello won the September 15, 1992 Democratic Primary and won the November 3, 1992 General election with 1,995 votes (73.6%) against Republican nominee Homer Shirley.
- 1994 Ajello was challenged in the September 13, 1994 Democratic Primary, but won, and was unopposed for the November 8, 1994 General election, winning with 1,243 votes.
- 1996 Ajello was unopposed for both the September 10, 1996 Democratic Primary, winning with 134 votes, and the November 5, 1996 General election with 1,428 votes.
- 1998 Ajello was challenged in the September 15, 1998 Democratic Primary, winning with 435 votes (55.0%) and won the November 3, 1998 General election with 1,409 votes (90.8%) against Independent candidate Peter Scharf.
- 2000 Ajello was unopposed for both the September 12, 2000 Democratic Primary, winning with 380 votes and the November 7, 2000 General election, winning with 1,980 votes.
- 2002 Ajello was unopposed for the September 10, 2002 Democratic Primary, winning with 1,548 votes and won the November 5, 2002 General election with 2,692 votes (82.4%) against Republican nominee Karl Poirier.
- 2004 Ajello was opposed by Dr. Howard Schulman in a Democratic Primary, winning 598 to 277 and won the November 2, 2004 General election with 3,241 votes (77.8%) against Republican nominee Daniel Harrop.
- 2006 Ajello was unopposed for both the September 12, 2006 Democratic Primary, winning with 969 votes, and the November 7, 2006 General election, winning with 3,104 votes.
- 2008 Ajello was unopposed for the September 9, 2008 Democratic Primary, winning with 373 votes, and the November 4, 2008 General election, winning with 3,439 votes.
- 2010 Ajello and returning 2004 Republican challenger Daniel Harrop were both unopposed for their September 23, 2010 primaries, setting up a rematch; Ajello won the November 2, 2010 General election with 2,215 votes (73.5%) against Harrop.
- 2012 Redistricted to District 1, and with incumbent Representative John McCauley retiring, Ajello was unopposed for the September 11, 2012 Democratic Primary, winning with 1,059 votes and won the November 6, 2012 General election with 2,890 votes (79.4%) against Independent candidate Francisco Gonzalez.
- 2014 Ajello faced Nathaniel Hannah in the September 9, 2014 Democratic Primary. She won the nomination with 1,392 votes (78.6%). She then ran unopposed in the November 4, 2014 General election.
- 2016 Ajello was unopposed in the September 13, 2016 Democratic Primary. She defeated Independent Raymond M. Mathieu in the November 8, 2016 General election with 2,963 votes (67.8%) to Mathieu's 1,398 votes (32%).
- 2018 Ajello was unopposed in the September 12, 2018 Democratic Primary and in the November 6, 2018 general election.
- 2020 Ajello was unopposed in the September 8, 2020 Democratic Primary and in the November 3, 2020 general election.
- 2022 Ajello was unopposed in the September 13, 2022 Democratic Primary. She defeated Independent Thomas O'Connell in the November 8, 2022 general election with 2,444 votes (87.5%) to O'Connell's 332 (11.9%).
- 2024 Ajello was unopposed in the September 10, 2024 Democratic Primary and in the November 5, 2024 general election.
- 2026 Ajello defeated Michael Garman in the September 9, 2026 Democratic Primary. She won the nomination with 1,535 votes (72.3%) and will be unopposed in the November 3, 2026 general election.
