= Ray Sullivan =

American politician (1977–2021)

Member of the Rhode Island House of Representatives from the 29th district
- In office January 3, 2005 – January 4, 2011
- Preceded by: Stephen J. Anderson
- Succeeded by: Lisa P. Tomasso

Personal details
- Born: January 31, 1977
- Died: October 11, 2021 (aged 44) Providence, Rhode Island, US
- Party: Democratic
- Education: Roger Williams University

Raymond J. Sullivan Jr. (January 31, 1977 – October 12, 2021) was an American politician who served as Democratic member of the Rhode Island House of Representatives. He represented the 29th District from 2005 to 2011, serving as the deputy majority leader. Sullivan died on October 12, 2021, at his home in Providence, Rhode Island at the age of 44.

== Early life ==
Ray J. Sullivan Jr. grew up in Coventry, Rhode Island. He received his diploma from Bishop Hendricken High School in 1995, and continued his education at Roger Williams University.

== Political career ==
Sullivan served 3 terms in the Rhode Island House of Representatives from 2005-2011. He was respected by his colleagues as a savvy and passionate political strategist. He served on several committees, including the Environmental and Natural Resources Committee, the Judiciary Committee, and the Separation of Powers and Oversight Committee. He also served as Vice Chair of the Rules Committee. In 2008 he was re-elected to the 29th District.

Sullivan paved the way for crucial discussions on issues of healthcare. He was the lead sponsor of legislation to allow the re-utilization of prescription drugs that would otherwise be thrown away and discarded, rather than go to those in need of it. In his local district, he became a key figure in ensuring that rural students had access to Epi-Pens that are needed in circumstances of an allergic reaction. He also pushed for greater investments into home health care and independent long term care services for seniors and veterans.

In February 2010, Sullivan announced his intention to not seek reelection in order to work as the deputy district director for public policy in the office of Congressman James Langevin.

== Marriage equality ==
In 2011, Sullivan was hired as executive director of Marriage Equality Rhode Island, a 501(c)(4) organization. He actively worked to support full marriage equality instead of a "discriminatory" civil unions bill. In 2013, he became campaign director of Rhode Islanders United for Marriage. In 2013, same-sex marriage passed in the Senate in April 2013, and in the House in May 2013. It was then signed into law by Governor Lincoln Chafee. Sullivan was one of the individuals awarded a House Resolution (H6116). He was committed "to making Marriage Equality possible for all loving and committed couples in the State of Rhode Island"

== Campaigns and activism ==
Sullivan was a campaign aide during the 2002 gubernatorial campaign of Democrat Myrth York. He served as state director on the Obama/Biden election campaign in 2008. He worked as a campaign manager for Democratic Congressman Jim Langevin's re-election campaign in Rhode Island's 2nd Congressional District in 2010. Before his death he directed public relations for the United Nurses and Allied Professionals (UNAP) union in Rhode Island. He also worked for Checkmate Consulting as a partner and political strategist.
