= John F. McBurney III =

American politician

Member of the Rhode Island Senate from the 15th district
- In office January 1975 – January 2011
- Succeeded by: Donna Nesselbush

Personal details
- Born: December 8, 1950 (age 75) Pawtucket, Rhode Island
- Party: Democratic
- Spouse: Cheryle
- Education: University of Rhode Island, Suffolk University
- Profession: attorney

John F. McBurney III (born December 8, 1950) was a Democratic member of the Rhode Island Senate, representing the 15th district from 1974 to 2010.

McBurney first won election to the Senate in 1974, replacing his father, John F. McBurney Jr., who had represented Pawtucket for 16 years. He announced his retirement from the Senate on July 2, 2010. Democrat Donna Nesselbush was elected to succeed him.
