= Elaine Coderre =

American politician

Member of the Rhode Island House of Representatives from the 60th district
- In office January 1985 – January 2015
- Preceded by: Scott Rabideau
- Succeeded by: David Coughlin, Jr.

Member of the Rhode Island House of Representatives from the 60th district
- In office January 1985 – January 2003
- Succeeded by: District abolished

Personal details
- Born: October 11, 1947 (age 78) Providence, Rhode Island
- Party: Democratic
- Education: University of Rhode Island

Elaine A. Coderre (born October 11, 1947, in Providence, Rhode Island) is an American politician and a Democratic member of the Rhode Island House of Representatives representing District 60 since January 2003. Coderre served consecutively from January 1985 until January 2003 in the District 78 seat.

== Education ==
Coderre earned her BA from University of Rhode Island.

== Elections ==
- 2012 Coderre was unopposed for both the September 11, 2012 Democratic Primary, winning with 586 votes, and the November 6, 2012 General election, winning with 3,225 votes.
- 1980s Coderre initially won election in the District 78 1984 Democratic Primary and the November 6, 1984 General election, and re-elected in the November 4, 1986 General election and the November 8, 1988 General election.
- 1990 Coderre won the September 11, 1990 Democratic Primary and was unopposed for the November 6, 1990 General election, winning with 1,762 votes.
- 1992 Coderre won the September 15, 1992 Democratic Primary and was unopposed for the November 3, 1992 General election, winning with 1,814 votes.
- 1994 Coderre was unopposed for both the September 13, 1994 Democratic Primary and the November 8, 1994 General election, winning with 1,414 votes.
- 1996 Coderre was unopposed for both the September 10, 1996 Democratic Primary and the November 5, 1996 General election.
- 1998 Coderre was unopposed for both the September 15, 1998 Democratic Primary, winning with 324 votes and the November 3, 1998 General election, winning with 1,247 votes.
- 2000 Coderre was unopposed for both the September 12, 2000 Democratic Primary, winning with 361 votes, and the November 7, 2000 General election, winning with 1,592 votes.
- 2002 Redistricted to District 60, and with incumbent Representative Scott Rabideau leaving the Legislature, Coderre was unopposed for both the September 10, 2002 Democratic Primary, winning with 816 votes, and the November 5, 2002 General election, winning with 1,921 votes.
- 2004 Coderre was unopposed for the September 14, 2004 Democratic Primary, winning with 430 votes and won the November 2, 2004 General election with 2,307 votes (72.4%) against Independent candidate John Arcaro.
- 2006 Coderre was unopposed for the September 12, 2006 Democratic Primary, winning with 636 votes, and won the November 7, 2006 General election with 2,151 votes (73.4%) against Republican nominee Brad Hines.
- 2008 Coderre was unopposed for both the September 9, 2008 Democratic Primary, winning with 463 votes, and the November 4, 2008 General election, winning with 3,041 votes.
- 2010 Coderre was unopposed for the September 23, 2010 Democratic Primary, winning with 820 votes, and won the November 2, 2010 General election with 1,653 votes (73.7%) against Republican nominee Samuel Tassia.
