= Timothy A. Williamson =

American politician

Member of the Rhode Island House of Representatives from the 38th (pre-2003); 25th (after 2003) district
- In office 5 January 1993 – 4 January 2011
- Preceded by: Thomas A. Lamb (D-38)
- Succeeded by: Jared Nunes (D-25)

Personal details
- Born: April 23, 1962 (age 64)
- Party: Democratic
- Spouse: Mary Ann
- Children: Connor and Avery
- Education: Rhode Island College, Creighton University School of Law
- Profession: Self-employed attorney

Timothy A. Williamson (born 1962) is an American attorney who is also a Democratic party member of the Rhode Island House of Representatives, representing the 38th District from 1993 to 2003 and the 25th district from 2003 to 2011. During the 2009-2010 sessions, he served on the House Committees on Separation of Powers, Judiciary, and Rules. He also served on the Joint Committee on Highway Safety and served as Senior Deputy Majority Leader. Williamson announced in late June 2010 that he would not be seeking reelection.
