= Robert Phillips (politician) =

Member of the Rhode Island House of Representatives

Bob Phillips

Member of the Rhode Island House of Representatives from the 51st district
- Incumbent
- Assumed office January 2011
- Preceded by: Christopher M. Fierro

Personal details
- Born: May 29, 1956 (age 70) Wiltshire, England, UK
- Party: Democratic
- Education: University of Rhode Island (BS)

Robert D. Phillips (born May 29, 1956) is an American politician and a Democratic member of the Rhode Island House of Representatives representing District 51 since January 2011.

== Education ==
Phillips earned his BS in business administration from the University of Rhode Island.

== Elections ==
- 2012 Phillips was unopposed for the September 11, 2012 Democratic Primary, winning with 620 votes and won the November 6, 2012 General election with 2,805 votes (63.7%) against Republican nominee Christopher Roberts.
- 2008 When District 51 Democratic Representative Roger Picard ran for Rhode Island Senate and left the seat open, Phillips ran in the six-way September 23, 2008 Democratic Primary, but lost to Christopher M. Fierro, who was unopposed for the November 4, 2008 General election.
- 2010 Phillips challenged Representative Fierro in the September 23, 2010 Democratic Primary, winning with 562 votes (53.3%) and was unopposed for the November 2, 2010 General election, winning with 2,373 votes.
