= Al Gomes =

American record producer

Al Gomes is an American record producer, music industry strategist, historian, and songwriter from Providence, Rhode Island, United States. Gomes has been in the music business for over 40 years, is the co-founder of Big Noise, was part of the team that launched the career of Christina Aguilera, and ran the successful publicity campaign that won The Beach Boys their first Grammy Award.

== Early years ==
After winning first place in an art contest in May 1973 at the age of 13 (juried by Rhode Island School of Design faculty), Gomes set his sights on a career in arts and entertainment. At this time, Gomes began writing, producing, and selling homemade cassettes of both original songs and comedic skits featuring neighborhood friends including Steven Yuppa.

He attended high school at LaSalle Academy in Providence, Rhode Island, pursuing a Liberal Arts curriculum with studies in illustration, writing, and filmmaking. Gomes earned a Varsity Letter from LaSalle Academy for his work with the school's Drama Club, as well as serving on the Social Awareness Committee (which organized the school's annual Fast Day and Food Drive at Thanksgiving time). By 1977, while still a student at LaSalle, he became a DJ at Brown University's student-run radio station WBRU-AM. He also served as News Director for a Junior Achievement-produced youth-oriented radio show at WPRO-FM (92 PRO-FM) called 'J.A.M.,' and as an on-air student reporter for LaSalle Academy for The Providence Journal-owned WPJB-FM (JB 105).

Gomes earned his Bachelor of Arts degree in Communication and Graphic Design at Rhode Island College in Providence. While attending college, he worked for the school paper, The Anchor, first as a columnist, then as Arts and Entertainment Editor. After the college radio organization, WRIC-FM, recruited him as a DJ, Gomes produced an on-air interview and music show, Backstage Pass, for the station. Interviews for both the newspaper and the radio show included The Police, The Ramones, Spyro Gyra, The Tubes, Dead Boys, Herman's Hermits, Ellen Foley, The Monkees, and Estelle Parsons.

His ongoing interest in songwriting solidified when Rhode Island College approved and financed a student-produced staging of Gomes and his new songwriting partner Jim Deragon's musical play, Suite Samantha in 1983. The play's poster was designed by noteworthy artist Spencer Crooks (Who's Who In American Art). A sequel to the musical, Rich Moves, was later staged at the concert venue The Living Room in Providence, RI.

== Career ==
=== Bandwagon ===
In 1986, inspired by Sir Bob Geldof's Band Aid and Live Aid projects, Gomes conceived the Bandwagon project with publicist Jamie Kurtis, and co-wrote and executive produced the three-song benefit recording, "Three Sides of Hunger" featuring "Surrender to Serenity" performed by co-writer Jim Beaupre, "Where Homes Is" performed by co-writers Mark Cutler and John Cafferty, and "A Piece of Our Hearts" (co-written with Mark Bram and Jamie Kurtis), performed by a 150-person celebrity chorus consisting of musicians, journalists (including MTV Networks executive producer Bill Flanagan), TV broadcasters, politicians, and the heads of human service agencies. Soloists on "A Piece of Our Hearts" included Cheryl Wheeler, and Belly and L7’s Gail Greenwood. All three songs received widespread radio airplay including "A Piece of Our Hearts", which was played simultaneously on dozens of radio stations on December 10, 1986 at 10:15 am EST.

Gomes also produced two sold-out televised Bandwagon benefit concerts. Bandwagon's goal was to elevate awareness of the plight of the poor in America and raise monies for American agencies that aid the hungry and homeless. For his efforts, Gomes went on to win The Jefferson Award from the Jacqueline Kennedy Onassis Foundation for Outstanding Public Service, joining past recipients Oprah Winfrey, President Jimmy Carter, Bob Hope, Paul Newman, and Harry Belafonte.

=== Big Noise ===
In 1990, Gomes, along with A. Michelle, founded Big Noise, an award-winning international music production, artist development, and music promotion and publicity firm. Gomes has assisted with the release of 900+ recordings of diverse musical genres by superstar and independent recording artists. He has managed many of the projects from concept to completion including helping the artist set a budget for each project, choice of the artist's material and producer, hands-on A&R direction in the studio, art direction of recording package, manufacturing of finished CD, and the publicity, marketing and distribution of the release. Gomes also assists with the branding of an artist, image, their business strategy and decisions, and the overall direction of their career.

Along with landing contracts for his artists with record companies and management firms, Gomes' creative work and marketing campaigns have earned his artists a total of six Grammy Award wins and ten Grammy Award nominations.

Gomes was part of the team that helped launch Christina Aguilera's career. After Aguilera was discovered by his good friend and colleague Steve Kurtz, Gomes served as Director of Online Entertainment and Marketing for Aguilera and her company, Three Wishes Productions, Inc. from 1998 to 2003, working as her publicist and webmaster ('Best Sites of the 21st Century' - Entertainment Weekly), as well as being her biographer and archivist, and serving on her promotion and marketing team. In addition, Gomes produced two singles for Aguilera ('Holiday With Christina' and 'What A Valentine Wants') and executive produced a #1 dance remix of her single 'What A Girl Wants' for RCA/BMG Records.

He also conceived and produced American Idol's Katharine McPhee's iTunes Christmas single, "A Gift to You", as well as serving as a regional judge for the TV show.

Gomes has also worked with The Beach Boys, Red Hot Chili Peppers, Chicago, Smokey Robinson, Dionne Warwick, Jim Brickman, Béla Fleck, Rock and Roll Hall of Famers Little Anthony and the Imperials, Gregory Porter, Jay Geils, Paul Doucette (Matchbox 20), Glenn Tilbrook (Squeeze), Freddy Cole, Bill Harley, multi-platinum producer Shelly Yakus, actor/directors Andrew McCarthy, Tiffani Thiessen, William Shatner, and many great independent artists.

Gomes' work has earned him Gold and Multi-Platinum Records from the Recording Industry Association of America.

He has produced 19 award-winning CD compilations including CDs for First Night Boston and the National Association of College Broadcasters. The NACB CD received Print Magazine's annual 'CD Design Award.'

He also produced the original motion picture soundtrack CDs for the directorial debuts of actors Andrew McCarthy ('News for the Church') and Tiffani Thiessen ('Just Pray,' which featured Paul Doucette from Matchbox 20 and Lori McKenna). He also produced two music documentaries, 1988’s 'The Rash Christmas Special' and 2005's 'Billy Gilman: The Making of Everything and More.'

Gomes is a full voting and nominating member of The Recording Academy (The Grammy Awards), as well as serving on the Grammy Nomination Craft Committees for Best Recording Package and Best Box Set.

Gomes has composed songs with many award-winning and renowned songwriters including four-time Emmy Award Winner Sean Callery ("24," "Medium", "La Femme Nikita"), John Cafferty ("Eddie and the Cruisers"), Jimmie Crane (Elvis Presley, Doris Day), Mike Viola ("That Thing You Do", "Walk Hard"), David Minehan (Paul Westerberg, The Neighborhoods), and Emmy Award Winner Chris Dominici (National Geographic Network, Fox Sports), among others.

In 2010, Gomes produced and co-wrote all of the tracks on pop singer Derek Carvalho's debut CD, Simple As That.

In 2013, The Beach Boys hired Gomes (along with his partner Connie Watrous) to run the successful publicity campaign that won the band their first Grammy Award for 'Best Historical Recording' for their box set The Smile Sessions. In the Rock and Roll Hall of Famers' 50-year career, The Beach Boys had never won a Grammy Award from the voting members of The Recording Academy. That all changed on February 10, 2013 at the 55th Annual celebration. Beach Boys' founder Brian Wilson and box set producers Alan Boyd and Dennis Wolfe accepted their Grammy Awards with words of thanks to The Beach Boys, extended family, and Gomes. The New York Times declared, "The Drought is Over!"

On August 9, 2017, Gomes and Watrous conceived, produced and MC'd a commemoration ceremony on-stage with The Beach Boys which honored the 40th Anniversary of the band performing for the largest concert audience ever assembled in the history of the State of Rhode Island - over 40,000 fans on September 2, 1977 at the Narragansett Park Race Track in Pawtucket, RI. Gomes and Watrous were also successful in getting the stretch of street where the concert stage stood forever renamed as 'Beach Boys Way.'

Gomes was inducted into the Rhode Island College Hall of Fame / Alumni Honor Roll in 2016.

In 2023, Gomes and Watrous, along with two-time Emmy Award Nominee Tim Labonte, ran the For Your Consideration strategic and outreach campaign that helped acclaimed actress Viola Davis win her Grammy Award for Best Audio Book, Narration & Storytelling Recording for the narration of her autobiography 'Finding Me.' This Grammy Award win gave Davis the prestigious status of EGOT, having won an Emmy, Grammy, Oscar, and Tony Award, making her one of only a few creative artists in history to achieve this honor. This was Gomes' sixth Grammy Award win for one of his artists that includes The Beach Boys, Gregory Porter, Ricky Kej and Wouter Kellerman, and Bill Harley.
