= Leonidas Raptakis =

American politician (born 1959)

Lou Raptakis

Member of the Rhode Island Senate from the 33rd district
- Incumbent
- Assumed office January 2013
- Preceded by: Glenford Shibley
- In office January 2003 – January 2011
- Preceded by: Daniel Connors
- Succeeded by: Glenford Shibley

Member of the Rhode Island Senate from the 20th district
- In office January 1997 – January 2003
- Preceded by: Jennie Day
- Succeeded by: Roger Badeau

Member of the Rhode Island House of Representatives from the 31st district
- In office January 1993 – January 1997
- Preceded by: Edward Dodd
- Succeeded by: Myrna George

Personal details
- Born: November 18, 1959 (age 66) Cranston, Rhode Island, U.S.
- Party: Democratic
- Education: Community College of Rhode Island; Rhode Island College

Leonidas P. “Lou” Raptakis (born November 18, 1959, in Cranston, Rhode Island) is an American politician and a Democratic member of the Rhode Island Senate representing District 33 since January 2013. Raptakis served non-consecutively from January 1997 until January 2011 in the District 20 and 33 seats, having served consecutively in the Rhode Island General Assembly from January 1993 until January 1997 in the Rhode Island House of Representatives District 31 seat. He was a candidate for Secretary of State of Rhode Island in 2010.

== Education ==
Raptakis earned his associate degree from the Community College of Rhode Island and his BA from Rhode Island College.

== Elections ==
- 2012 To challenge District 33 incumbent Republican Senator Glenford Shibley, Raptakis ran in the September 11, 2012, Democratic Primary, winning with 1,318 votes (61.1%), and won the November 6, 2012, General election with 7,761 votes (61.6%) against Senator Shibley.
- 1992 Raptakis won the House District 31 September 15, 1992, Democratic Primary and won the three-way November 3, 1992, General election with 2,943 votes (57.6%) against Republican nominee Alice Stratton and Independent candidate John Trafford.
- 1994 Raptakis was unopposed for both the September 13, 1994, Democratic Primary and the November 8, 1994, General election, winning with 3,024 votes.
- 1996 Raptakis challenged Senate District 20 incumbent Senator Jennie Day in the three-way September 10, 1996, Democratic Primary, winning with 940 votes (56.3%) and was unopposed for the November 5, 1996, General election, winning with 5,572 votes.
- 1998 Raptakis was challenged in the September 15, 1998, Democratic Primary, winning with 677 votes (%84.7), and was unopposed for the November 3, 1998, General election, winning with 4,813 votes.
- 2000 Raptakis was unopposed for both the September 12, 2000, Democratic Primary, winning with 886 votes, and the November 7, 2000, General election, winning with 5,838 votes.
- 2002 Redistricted to District 33, and with incumbent Senator Daniel Connors redistricted to District 19, Raptakis was challenged in the September 10, 2002, Democratic Primary, winning with 1,475 votes (73.6%), and won the November 5, 2002, General election with 5,639 votes (60.3%) against Republican nominee Jonathan Farnum.
- 2004 Raptakis was unopposed for both the September 14, 2004, Democratic Primary, winning with 673 votes, and the November 2, 2004, General election, winning with 8,876 votes.
- 2006 Raptakis was unopposed for both the September 12, 2006, Democratic Primary, winning with 1,170 votes, and the November 7, 2006, General election, winning with 9,432 votes.
- 2008 Raptakis was unopposed for both the September 9, 2008, Democratic primary, winning with 692 votes, and the November 4, 2008, General election, winning with 9,736 votes.
- 2010 Raptakis challenged incumbent Rhode Island Secretary of State A. Ralph Mollis in the September 23, 2010, Democratic Primary, but lost to Mollis, who won re-election in the November 2, 2010, General election against Republican nominee Catherine Taylor.
