= Christopher M. Fierro =

American politician (born 1980)

Member of the Rhode Island House of Representatives from the 51st district
- In office 2 January 2009 – 4 January 2011
- Preceded by: Roger A. Picard (D-51)
- Succeeded by: Robert D. Phillips (D-51)

Personal details
- Born: February 22, 1980 (age 46)
- Party: Democratic
- Spouse: Julie Fierro
- Children: Annabelle, and Vincenzo
- Education: University of Massachusetts Amherst: MS, 2004, BA, 2002
- Profession: Research specialist

Christopher M. Fierro (born February 22, 1980) is an American politician who is a Democratic member of the Rhode Island House of Representatives, representing the 51st District since 2 January 2009. During the 2009-2010 sessions, he served on the House Committee on Finance. Fierro was defeated for reelection in the 14 September November 2010 Democratic primary elections to Robert D. Phillips, who went on to win the seat in the general election.
