= Rhode Island College =

Public college in Providence, Rhode Island, U.S.

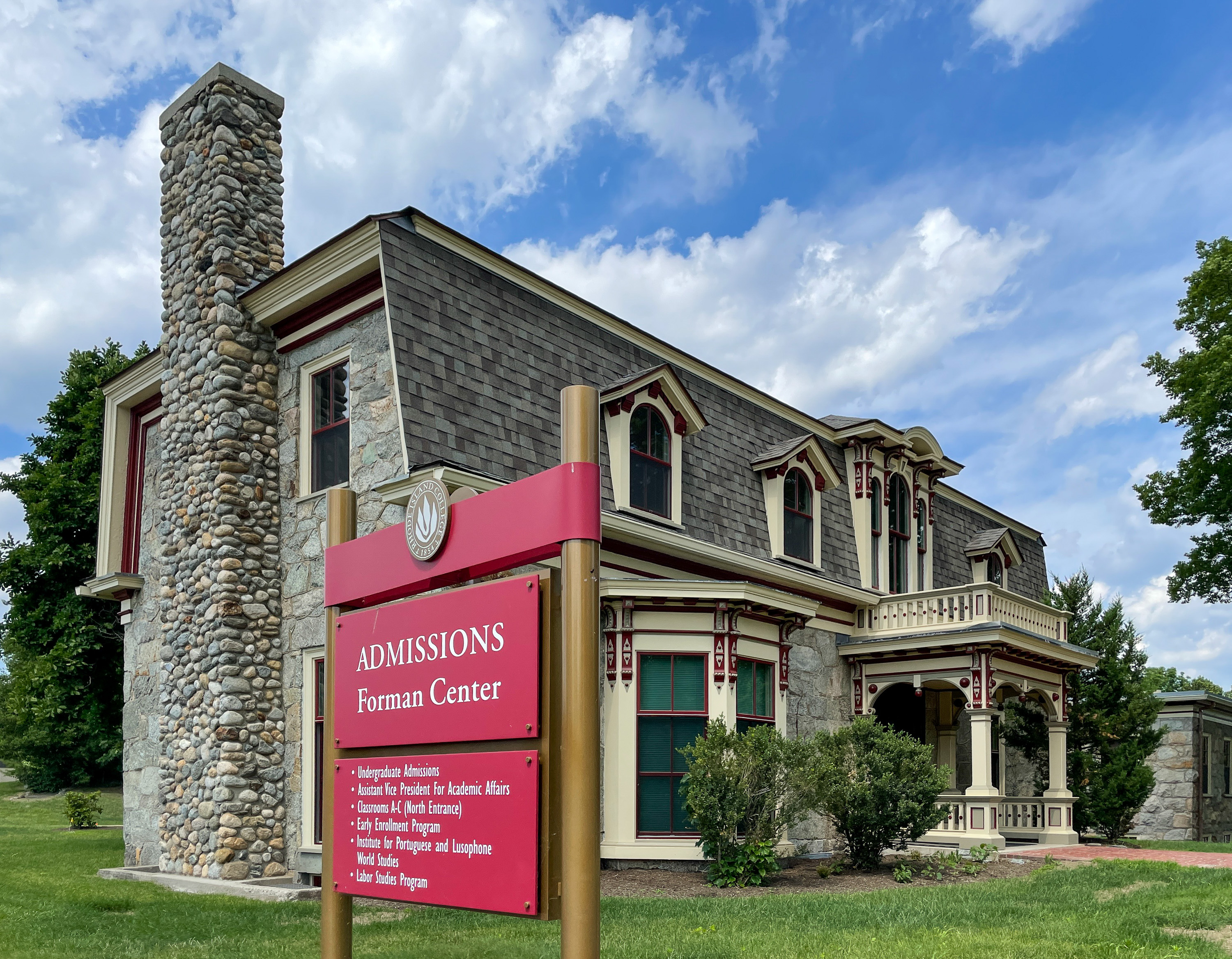
- Former names: Rhode Island State Normal School (1854–1871); Rhode Island Normal School (1871–1920); Rhode Island College of Education (1920–1959)
- Motto: Reach. Inspire. Connect.
- Type: Public college
- Established: 1854; 172 years ago
- Academic affiliations: CUMU; Space-grant
- Endowment: $33.5million
- President: Jack R. Warner
- Students: 6,158
- Undergraduates: 5,157
- Postgraduates: 1,001
- Location: Providence and North Providence, Rhode Island, U.S. 41°50′32″N 71°27′40″W
- Campus: Suburban, 180 acres (73 ha)
- Newspaper: The Anchor
- Colors: Burgundy, gold, white
- Nickname: Anchormen
- Mascot: Anchorman
- Website: ric.edu

Rhode Island College (RIC) is a public college in Providence, and North Providence, Rhode Island, United States. The college was established in 1854 as the Rhode Island State Normal School, making it the second-oldest institution of higher education in Rhode Island after Brown University. Located on a 180-acre (73 ha) campus, the college has a student body of 6,000. RIC is a member of the NCAA and has 17 Division III teams.

== History ==
Rhode Island College was first established as the "Rhode Island State Normal School" by the Rhode Island General Assembly in 1854. Its creation can be attributed to the labors of Henry Barnard, the first state agent for education in Rhode Island who had established the Rhode Island Teachers Institute at Smithville Seminary in 1845, and his successor, Elisha Potter. The Rhode Island State Normal School was one of the nation's first normal schools (teacher preparatory schools), which grew out of the humanitarian groundswell of the mid-19th century spurred by educational missionaries like Horace Mann. The school attracted hard working young people who came chiefly from ordinary backgrounds.

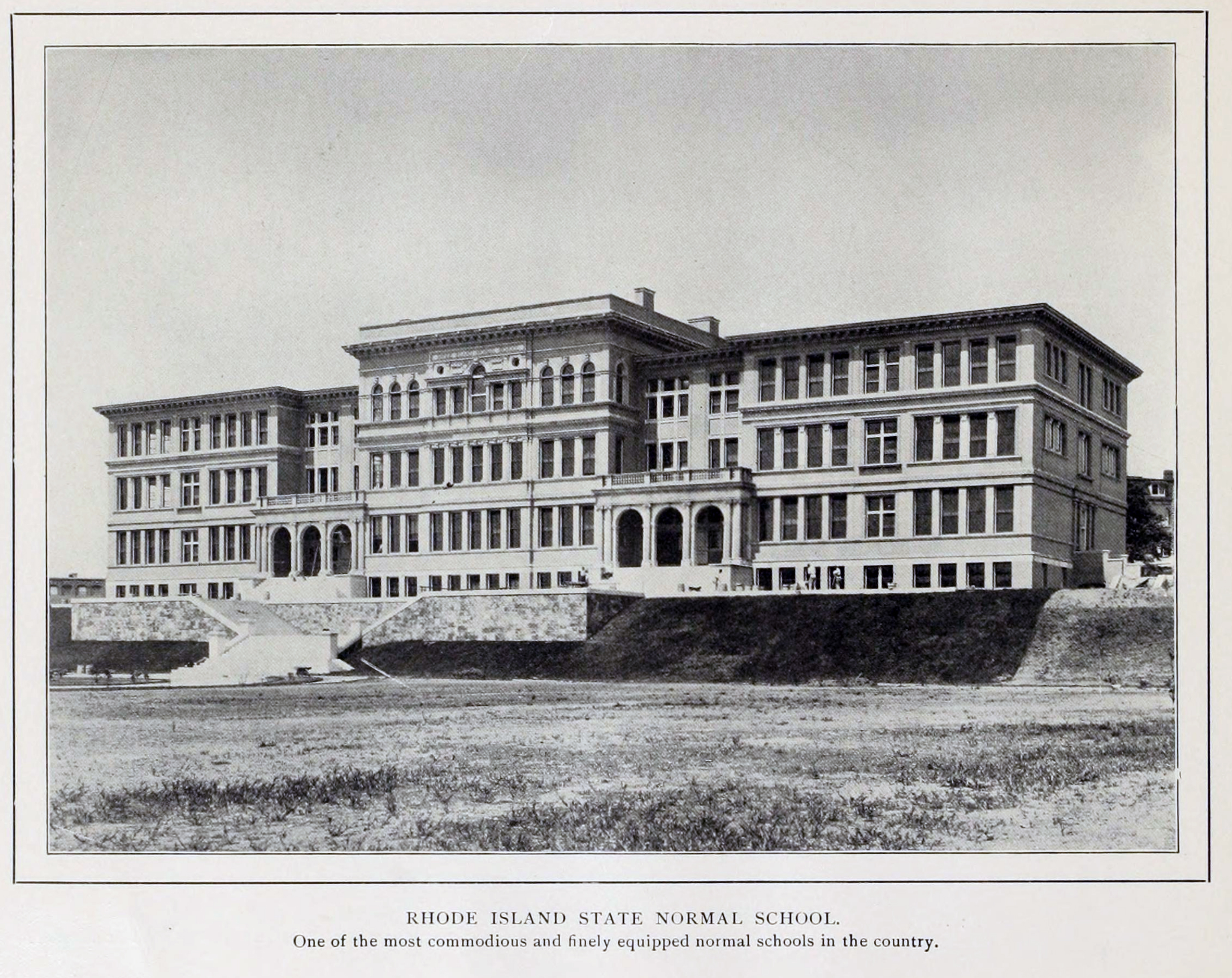
Rhode Island Normal School, 1900

Not yet thoroughly convinced of the school's value, the General Assembly curtailed its financial support in 1857 and the school was moved to Bristol where it lingered until 1865 before closing. However, in 1869, the newly appointed state commissioner of education, Thomas W. Bicknell, began a vigorous personal campaign to revive the school. His efforts were rewarded in 1871 when the General Assembly unanimously voted a $10,000 appropriation for the school's re-opening in Providence.

Renamed the "Rhode Island Normal School", the institution settled into a period of steady growth punctuated by periodic moves to larger quarters. The general favor won by the school, after its first difficult years had passed, was confirmed in 1898 when it moved into a large building specially constructed for it on Providence's Capitol Hill near the State House.

In 1920, the Rhode Island Normal School was renamed "Rhode Island College of Education" by order of the General Assembly. The college now offered a four-year program which upon a student's completion would grant a Bachelor of Education degree. At this time the observation school, which dated back to the 1890s, was renamed the Henry Barnard School. The college's graduate program also originated in the early 1920s and the first master's degrees were conferred in 1924.

For the next three decades the college remained a teachers' college with a student body of four to six hundred men and women. Early in the 1950s, intense debate arose over the college's role in the state system of higher education, and, for a time, serious doubt was cast on its continued existence. There were plans to merge the institution with Rhode Island's other four-year college, the University of Rhode Island. After careful consideration, the Board of Trustees of State Colleges decided to keep the college independent and strengthen it overall.

In 1958, the college was moved to its current campus in the Mount Pleasant section of Providence. In 1959, the Rhode Island Commission to Study Higher Education recommended the development of the institution into a general college which was approved by the General Assembly. Reflecting the broadening of purpose, the institution's name was changed to its current name "Rhode Island College" in 1959.

The East Campus includes the former grounds of the Rhode Island State Home and School for Dependent and Neglected Children, the first post-Civil War orphanage in the country. In recent years, many efforts have been undertaken by Rhode Island College and its benefactors to preserve the Yellow Cottage (or Cottage C), one of the original structures from the State Home.

=== Principals and presidents ===
The president is the chief executive officer; prior to 1920, the chief academic officer of the college was known as the principal. Jack R. Warner is the eleventh president, and 19th chief officer of Rhode Island College, starting his position in 2022. On January 6, 2022, previous president Frank Sánchez announced that he would not seek a third term as president of the college; his term ended on June 30, 2022 and was replaced by Jack R. Warner.

Principal	Years in office
Dana P. Colburn	1854–1859
Joshua Kendall	1860–1864
James C. Greenough	1871–1883
Thomas J. Morgan	1883–1888
George A. Littlefield	1889–1892
William E. Wilson	1892–1898
Fred Gowing	1898–1901
Charles S. Chapin	1901–1907
John L. Alger	1908–1920
John L. Alger	1920–1938

Principal	Years in office
Lucius A. Whipple	1939–1950
William C. Gaige	1952–1966
Joseph Kauffman	1968–1973
Charles B. Willard	1973–1977
David E. Sweet	1977–1984
Carol J. Guardo	1986–1989
John Nazarian	1990–2008
Nancy Carriuolo	2008–2016
Frank Sánchez	2016–2022
Jack R. Warner	2022–

== Academics ==
Academic programs at Rhode Island College are divided into five colleges: the Faculty of Arts and Sciences, the Feinstein School of Education and Human Development, the School of Business, the School of Nursing, and the School of Social Work. These schools offer more than 90 undergraduate and 30 graduate programs for students. Rhode Island College is accredited by the New England Commission of Higher Education. Among the five colleges, individual departments have received additional accreditation from the following associations: Council on Social Work Education, National Association of Schools of Art and Design, National Association of Schools of Music, National Association of State Directors of Teacher Education and Certification, National Council for Accreditation of Teacher Education, and the Commission on Collegiate Nursing Education. Forbes magazine ranked the college 618th.

== Student life ==
Undergraduate demographics as of fall 2023
Race and ethnicity	Total
White	49%
Hispanic	26%
Black	12%
Unknown	7%
Asian	3%
Two or more races	2%
American Indian/Alaska Native	1%
Economic diversity
Low-income (Note: The percentage of students who received an income-based federal Pell grant intended for low-income students.)	43%
Affluent (Note: The percentage of students who are a part of the American middle class at the bare minimum.)	57%

Enrollment is predominantly from Rhode Island, Massachusetts and Connecticut. Of the students, 67% are female.

The school's newspaper, The Anchor, has been running since 1928 as an independent, student-run publication. Its radio station is 90.7 WXIN Rhode Island College Radio.

Student activities and clubs on campus are governed and funded by Student Community Government, Inc., a semi-autonomous organization financed by the college's student activity fee, consisting of an executive board, parliament, and several committees. Student Parliament consists of 34 student positions and a number of by-lawed positions. Those positions include seats taken by administrators, faculty, staff and alumni. All student representatives of Student Parliament represent a constituency whose concerns they are supposed to represent throughout the academic year.

The James P. Adams Library is the main library. Students, faculty, staff, and the community have access to a wide variety of knowledge resources including electronic reference resources, e-books, databases, audiovisual materials, and special collections. The library is also the academic, social, and intellectual center of the campus, hosting a variety of lectures, exhibits and performances to the benefit of the campus community.

RIC has six residence halls which house 1,194 undergraduate students. Penfield Hall, a new $30 million, energy efficient, LEED-certified residence hall opened in 2007. The 125,000-square-foot (11,600 m^{2}) building expanded the institution's existing housing capacity by 44%.

The Unity Center is non-denominational with many religions, ethnic groups, and academic concentrations represented.

=== Greek life ===
Rhode Island College has recently seen an increase in Greek life on campus. The Greek Council consists of two fraternities and three NPC sororities, as well as numerous multicultural organizations. Fraternities at Rhode Island College are Alpha Sigma Phi and Kappa Sigma. Sororities at Rhode Island College are Alpha Sigma Tau, Delta Phi Epsilon, Theta Phi Alpha, and Zeta Phi Beta.

=== Athletics ===
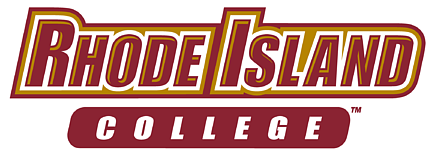
Rhode Island athletics mark

Rhode Island College teams, the Anchormen, participate in the National Collegiate Athletic Association's Division III as a member of the Little East Conference. Men's sports include baseball, basketball, cross country, golf, soccer, swimming & diving, tennis, track & field and wrestling; women's sports include basketball, cross country, golf, gymnastics, lacrosse, soccer, softball, swimming & diving, tennis, track & field, and volleyball.

The Intercollegiate Athletic Arena, an 8,000-seat facility, is the home of the Rhode Island College Anchormen basketball teams.

=== Arts ===
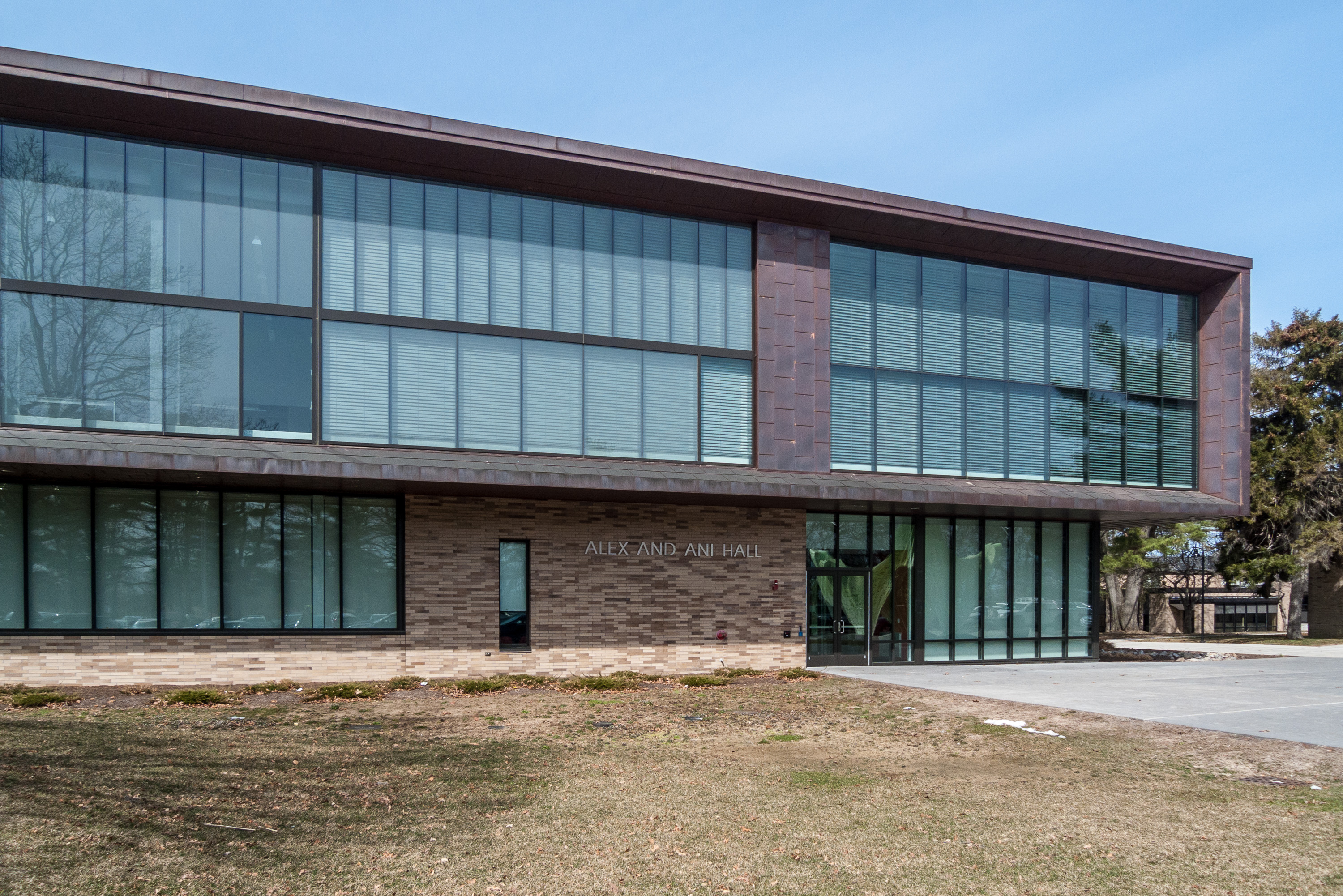
Alex and Ani Hall opened in 2014 as the school's renovated and expanded center for the visual arts.

The Rhode Island College Department of Music, Theatre, and Dance was established in 1972.

Theatre students in the program have been top competitors at the Region I American College Theatre Festival, either winning first, second or honorable distinction. The department's faculty have included pianist, composer, and filmmaker Judith Lynn Stillman, who serves as artist-in-residence and professor of Music.

== Gallery ==
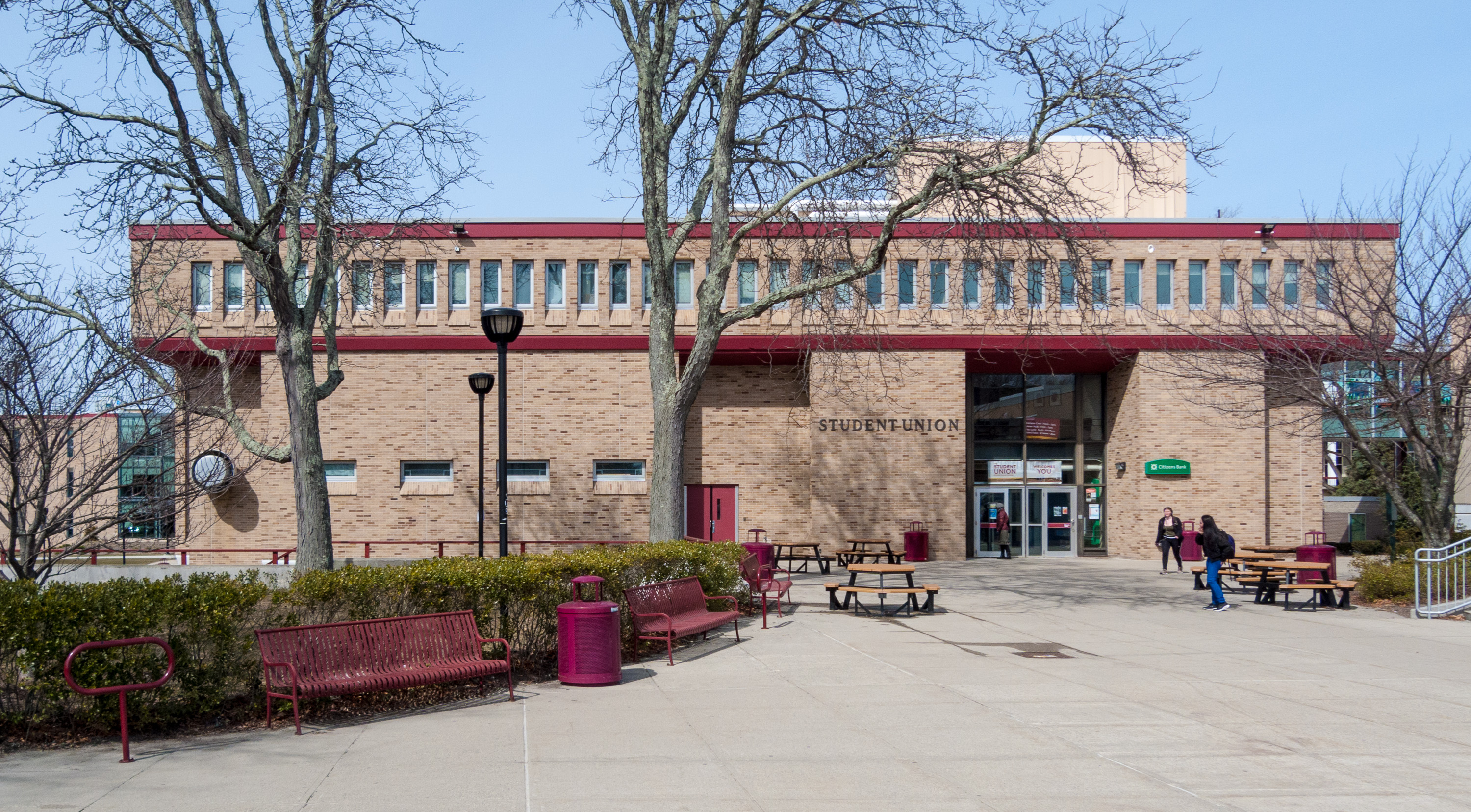
The Student Union opened in 1968.

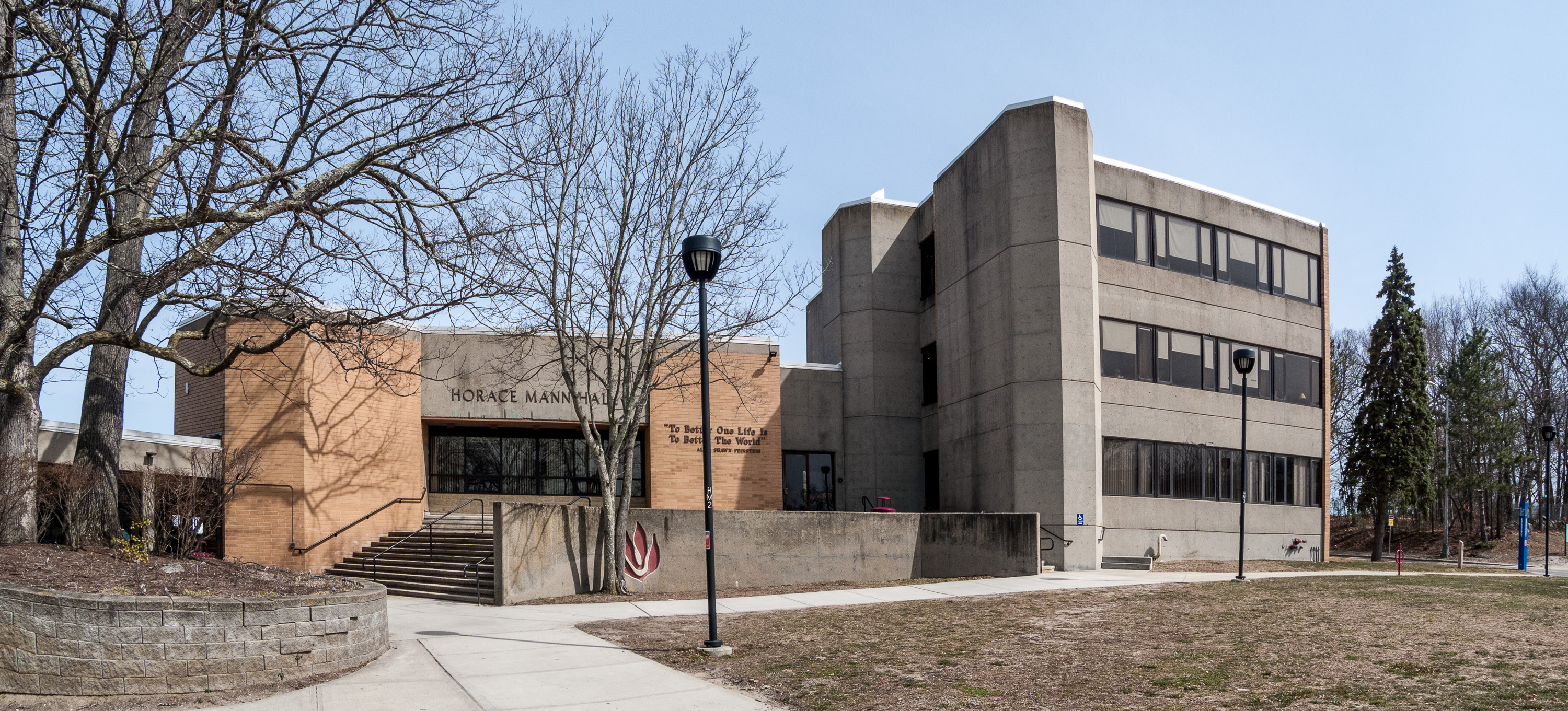
Horace Mann Hall, built in 1971, houses the Feinstein School of Education and Human Development.

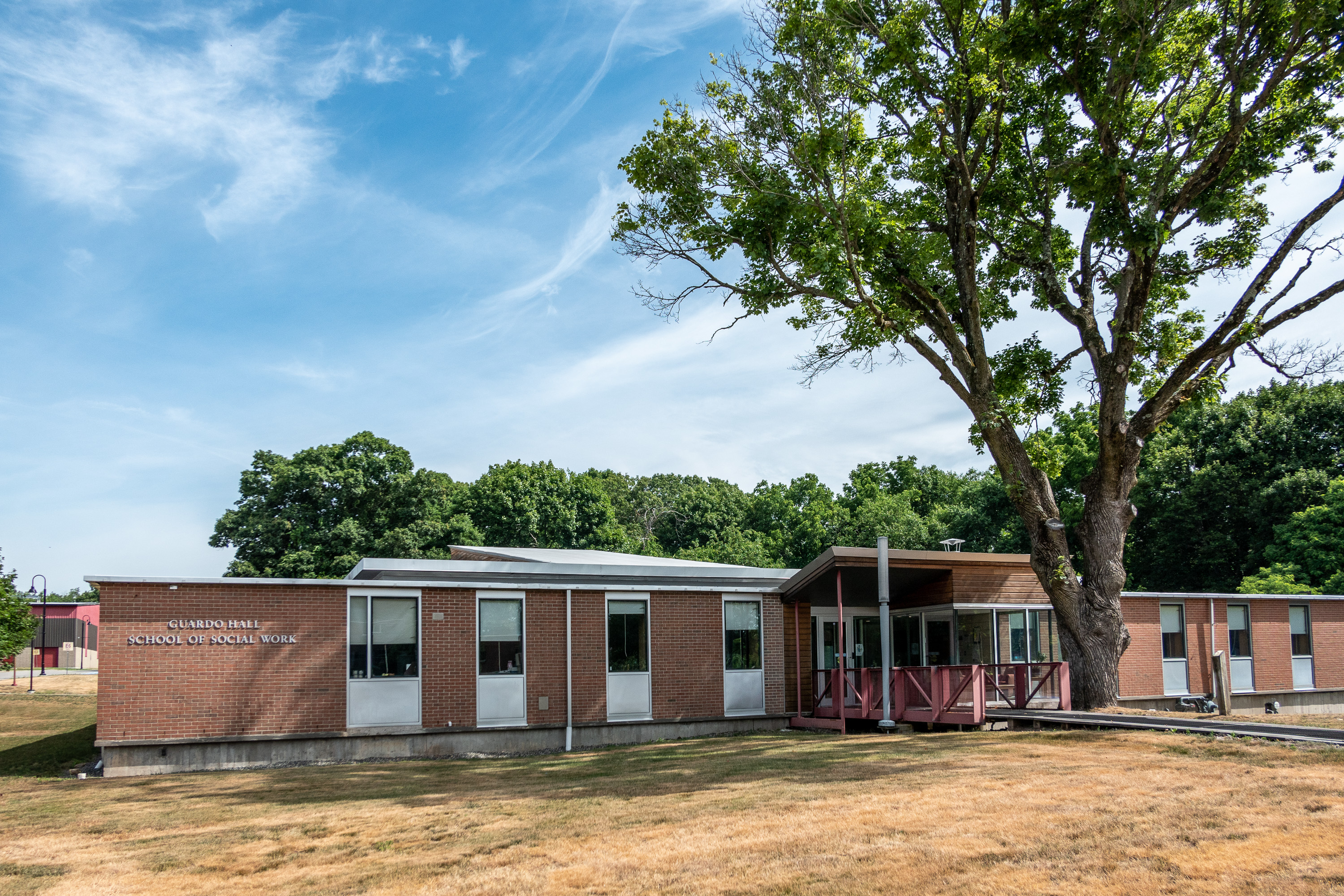
Guardo Hall, School of Social Work

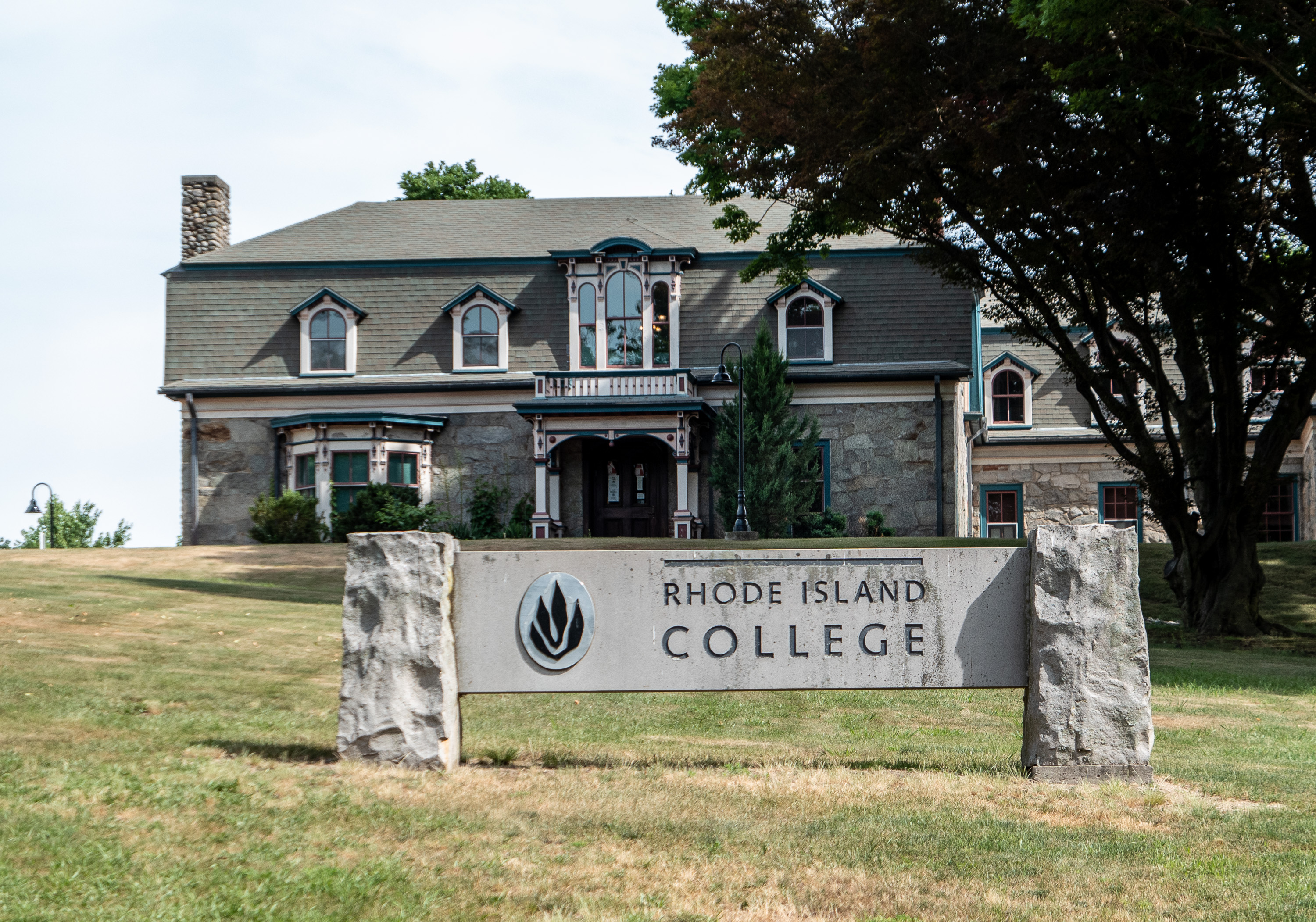
Former superintendent's residence of the State Home and School for Dependent and Neglected Children

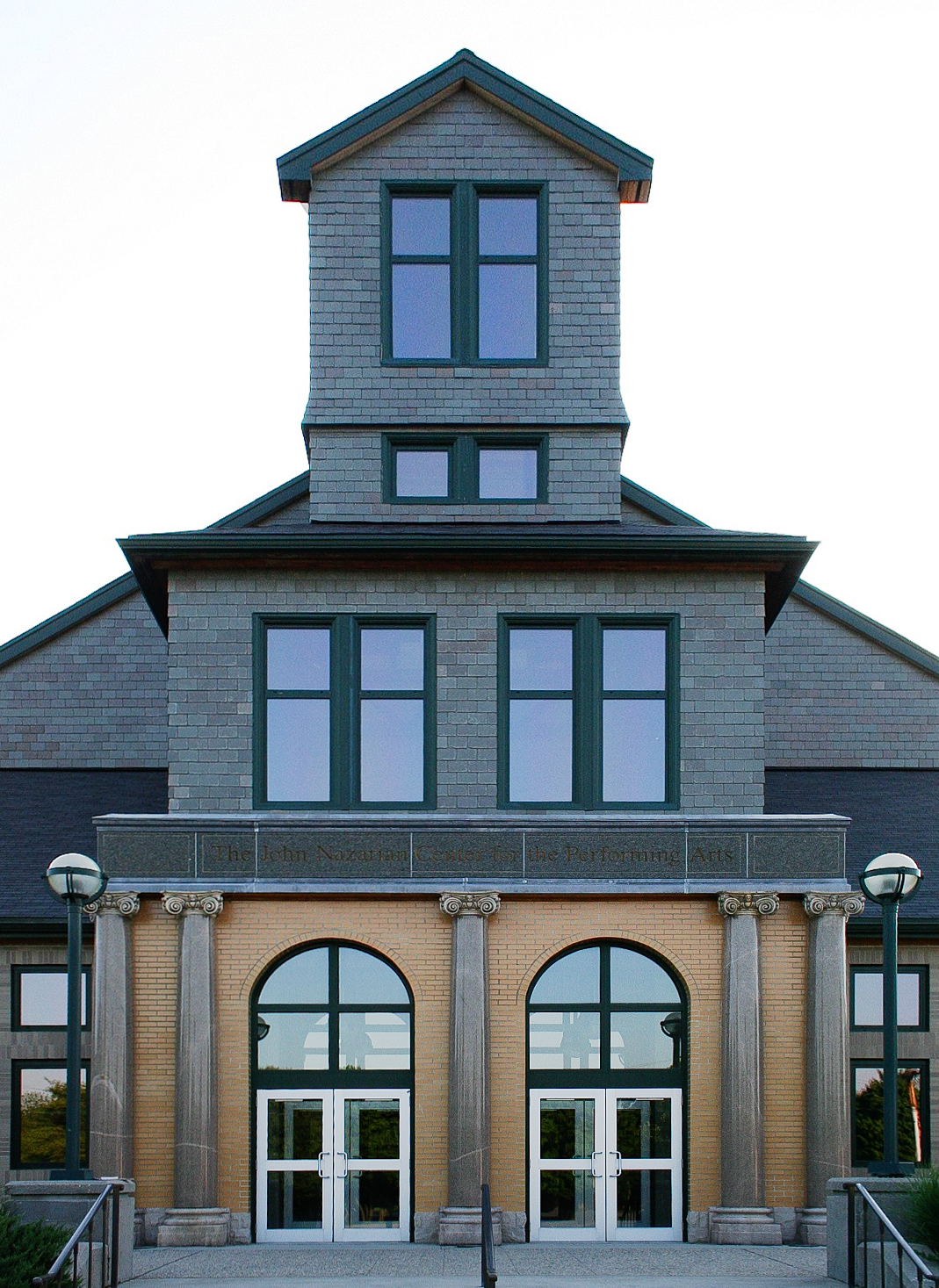
The facade of the John Nazarian Center for the Performing Arts incorporates columns from the original Normal School Building.

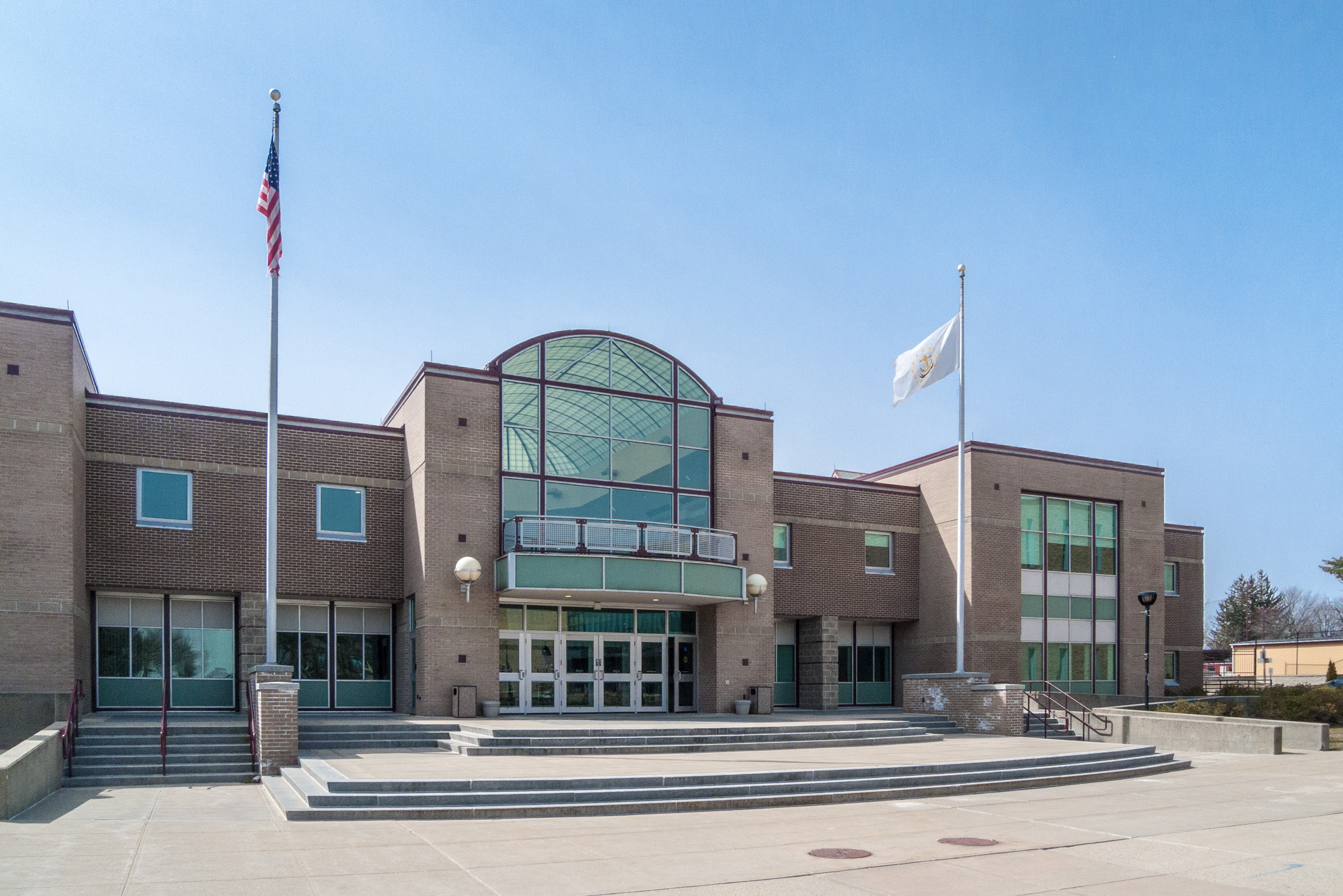
Murray Center is home to the school's health and athletics facilities.

== Notable alumni ==
Notable alumni of Rhode Island College in arts and media include Grammy-, Tony-, Emmy-, and Oscar-winning actress Viola Davis (Class of 1988); actor and playwright Ron McLarty (Class of 1969); visual artist Patricia Cronin (Class of 1986); Grammy-nominated composer Peter Boyer (Class of 1991); Jefferson Award-winning music producer Al Gomes (Class of 1986); figurative painter Ann Gale (Class of 1988); and Family Guy producer Danny Smith (Class of 1981). Alumni in journalism and reporting include news anchor Anaridis Rodriguez, and sports anchor Jim Rose.

Alumni who have served as members of the Rhode Island House of Representatives include Maria Cimini (Class of 2002), Raymond Gallison (Class of 1974), Karen MacBeth, Mary Messier, Patricia Morgan, William O'Brien, Thomas Palangio, Harold Metts, David Bennett. Graduates in the Rhode Island State Senate include Maryellen Goodwin, Nicholas Kettle, Daniel Issa, J. Michael Lenihan, Roger Picard, Juan Pichardo, Leonidas Raptakis, James Sheehan, Adam Satchell, and Frank Lombardo. Other alumni in politics include Allan Fung (Class of 1992), former congressman James Langevin (D-RI-2, Class of 1990), 70th Lieutenant Governor of RI Sabina Matos (Class of 2001), and Robert J. Healey (Class of 1979).

Other notable graduates include 1995 US Women's Chess Champion Sharon Ellen Burtman; mountaineer, educator, and suffragist Annie Smith Peck; and pioneering African-American educator and chemist Josephine Silone Yates (Class of 1879).

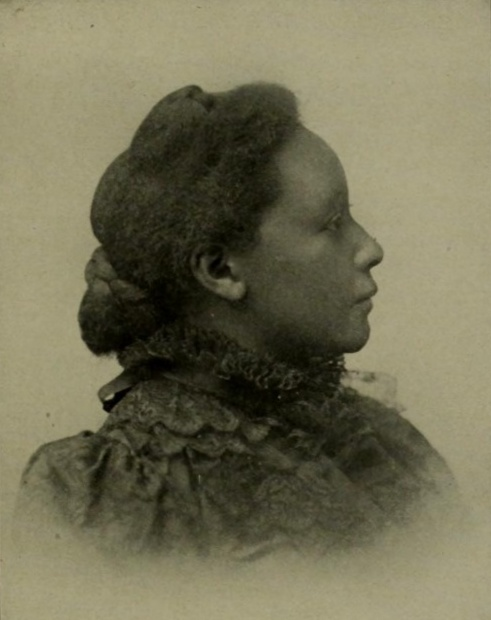
Educator and chemist, Josephine Silone Yates (Class of 1879)

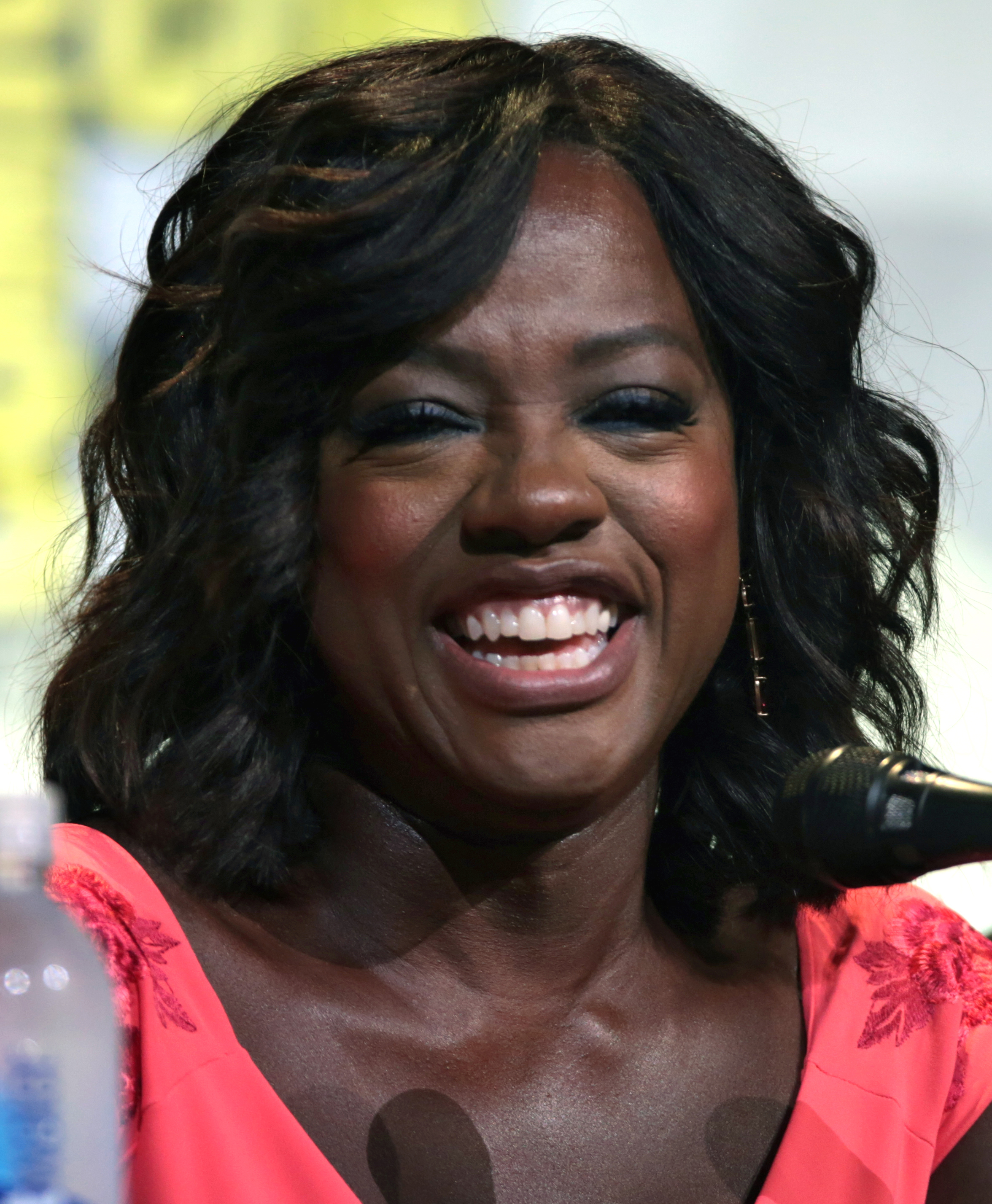
Oscar-winning actress Viola Davis (Class of 1988)

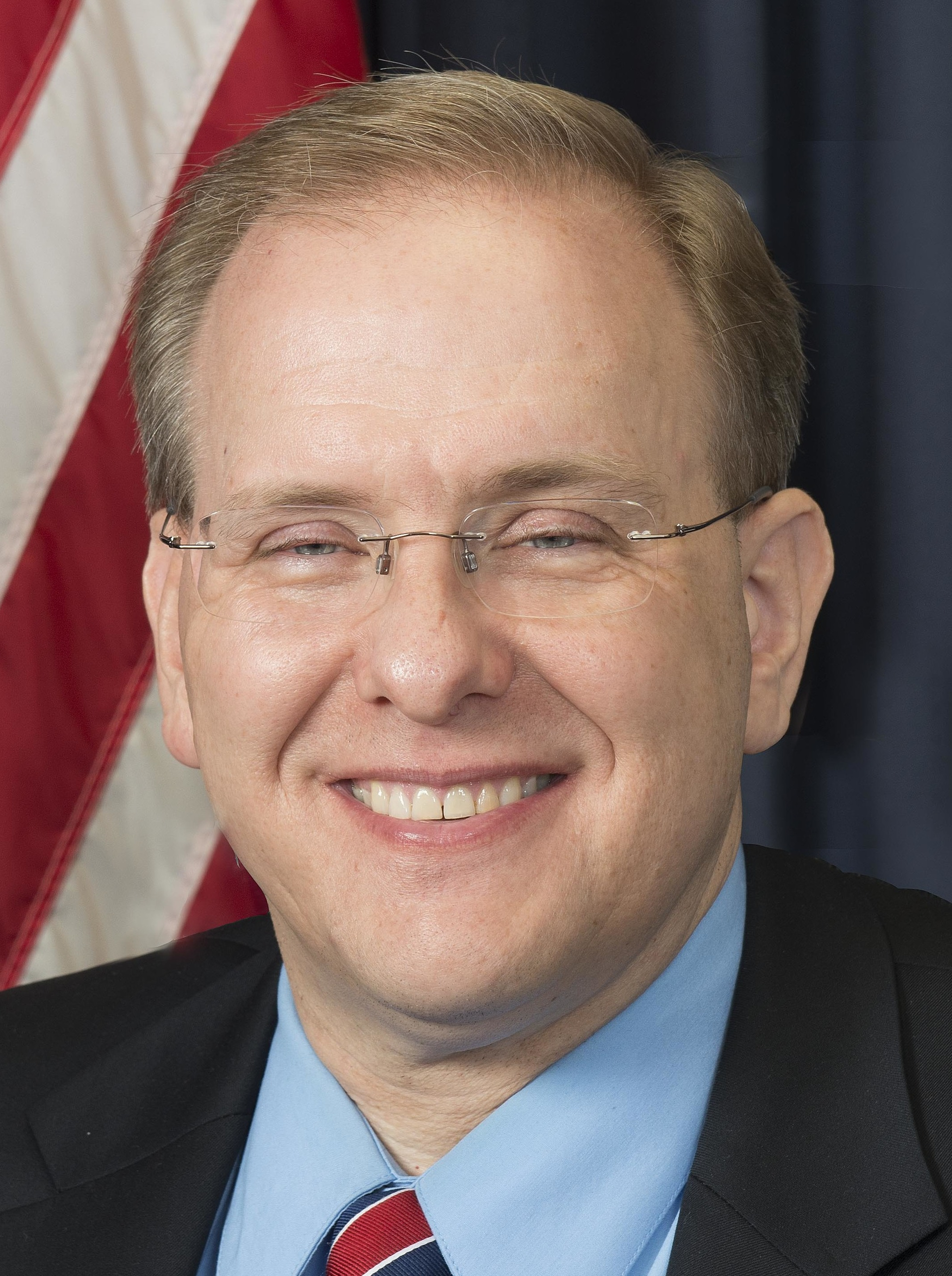
Congressman James Langevin (D-RI-2, Class of 1990)

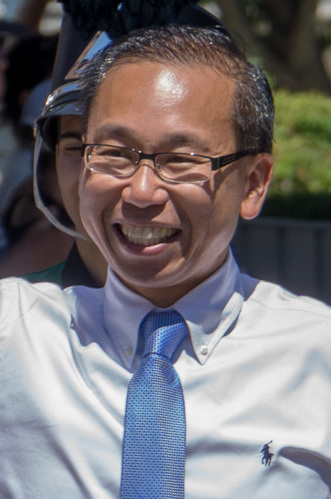
First Asian-American mayor of Cranston, Allan Fung (Class of 1992)

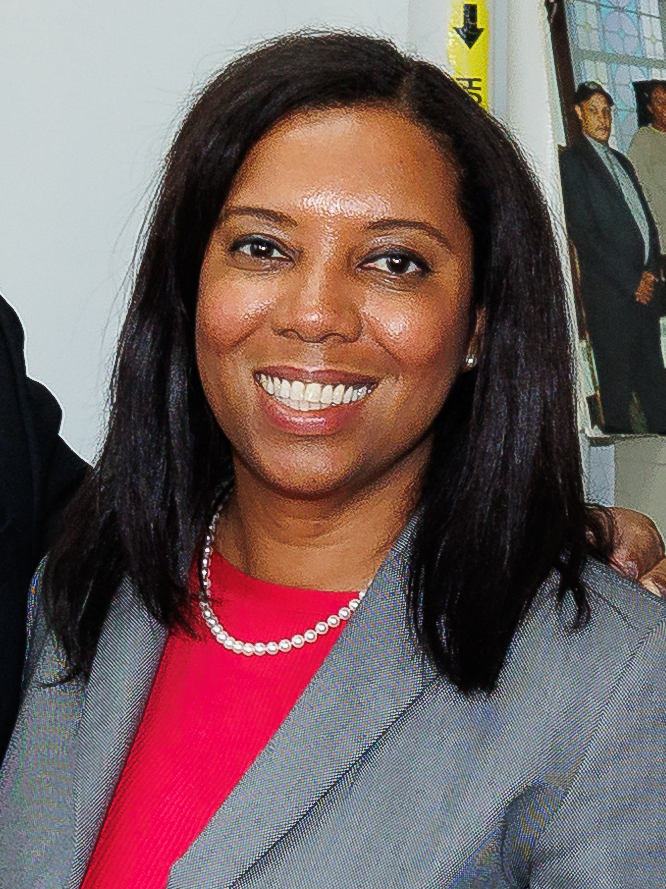
70th Lieutenant Governor of Rhode Island, Sabina Matos (Class of 2001)
