= The Anchor (newspaper) =

Newspaper for the Rhode Island College campus

- "Free Access to Ideas... Full Freedom of Expression"
- Type: Weekly student newspaper
- Format: Newspaper
- School: Rhode Island College
- Editor-in-chief: Kelcy Conroy
- Managing editor: Tim Yean
- Founded: 1928
- Headquarters: Ducey Student Media Center; Student Union Plaza; Rhode Island College; Providence, Rhode Island
- Circulation: 500 (as of the 2023-24 academic year)
- Website: anchorweb.org

The Anchor is a student newspaper at Rhode Island College, established in 1928. It is student-run and published weekly during the academic year. Editorial decisions are made by a majority vote of its student editorial board.

As of October 2025, articles are posted online weekly on Monday, with a print edition published once a month.

== Notable alumni ==
- Al Gomes, music producer and songwriter
- Danny Smith, executive producer (Family Guy)
