= Glenford Shibley =

American politician

Member of the Rhode Island Senate from the 33rd district
- In office January 4, 2011 – January 1, 2013
- Preceded by: Leonidas Raptakis
- Succeeded by: Leonidas Raptakis

Personal details
- Born: March 18, 1951 Pontiac, Michigan, U.S.
- Died: September 17, 2021 (aged 70) Coventry, Rhode Island, U.S.
- Party: Republican

Glenford Shibley (March 18, 1951 – September 17, 2021) was an American politician who served in the Rhode Island Senate from the 33rd district from 2011 to 2013.

He died on September 17, 2021, in Coventry, Rhode Island at age 70.
