= Jonathan Farnum =

American politician (1939–2025)

Jonathan Knight Farnum (April 17, 1939 – August 19, 2025) was an American politician.

== Life and career ==
Farnum attended school in Summit, New Jersey. After graduating from Phillips Exeter Academy in 1957, he earned degrees from Yale College in 1961, and Harvard Business School in 1963. He worked within Brown University's financial department, rising to become associate vice president of finance and operations. Farnum left Brown for the Wardwell Braiding Machine Company, where he spent three decades, including stints as chief executive officer and president.

Farnum sat on the Rhode Island House of Representatives for District 21, and served as minority leader during a portion of his term. In 2002, Farnum faced Leonidas Raptakis in a legislative election. In June 2005, the Rhode Island Senate appointed Farnum to the Narragansett Bay Commission until April 2006. He was reconsidered for the position in March 2007, for a term ending in April 2009.

In 2024, the Jonathan K. Farnum Scholarship was established at the University of Rhode Island by the Simon W. Wardell Foundation. Farnum died on August 19, 2025, at the age of 86.
