= State Home and School for Dependent and Neglected Children =

- State Home and School for Dependent and Neglected Children Historic District
- U.S. National Register of Historic Places
- U.S. Historic district
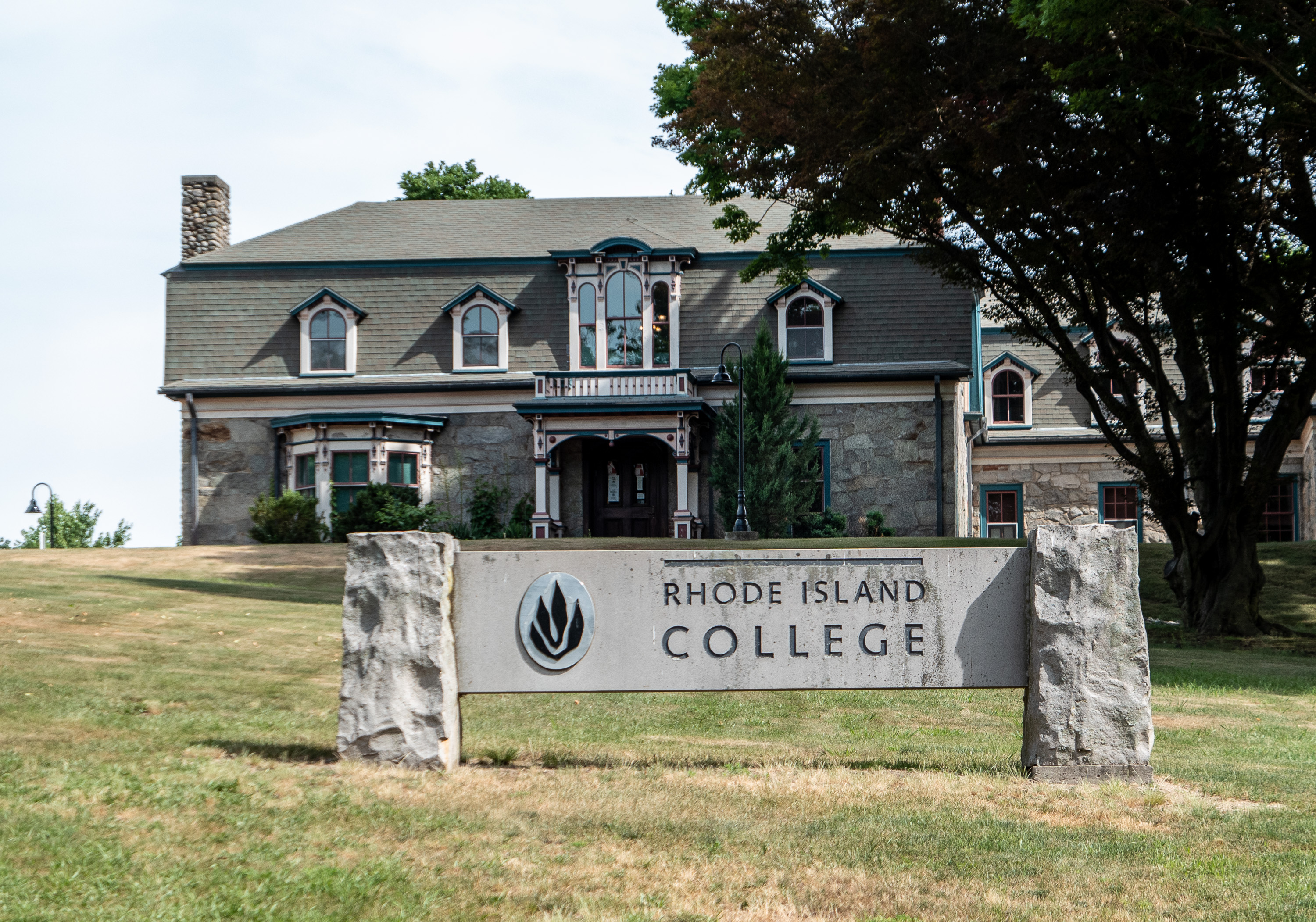
- Former superintendent's residence

- Location within Rhode Island Location within the United States
- Location: Rhode Island College, East Campus, 600 Mount Pleasant Ave. Providence, Rhode Island
- Coordinates: 41°50′38″N 71°27′24″W
- Area: 38 acres (15 ha)
- Architect: Multiple
- NRHP reference No.: 100004820
- Added to NRHP: December 30, 2019

The State Home and School for Dependent and Neglected Children was a state institution for children in Providence, Rhode Island. Following the American Civil War, states assumed new responsibilities for the care of adults and children living in poverty or with serious illnesses. The State Home, and organizations like it across the country, sought to remove dependent children from adult correctional institutes, almshouses, and juvenile reformatories. It was located on a cottage-plan campus in what was originally rural western Providence, on a former gentleman's farm. The school was established in 1884 and operated until 1979, when its remaining functions were taken over by other state organizations. Most of its surviving grounds and buildings are now on the Rhode Island College East Campus, and have been listed as a historic district on the National Register of Historic Places.

== History ==
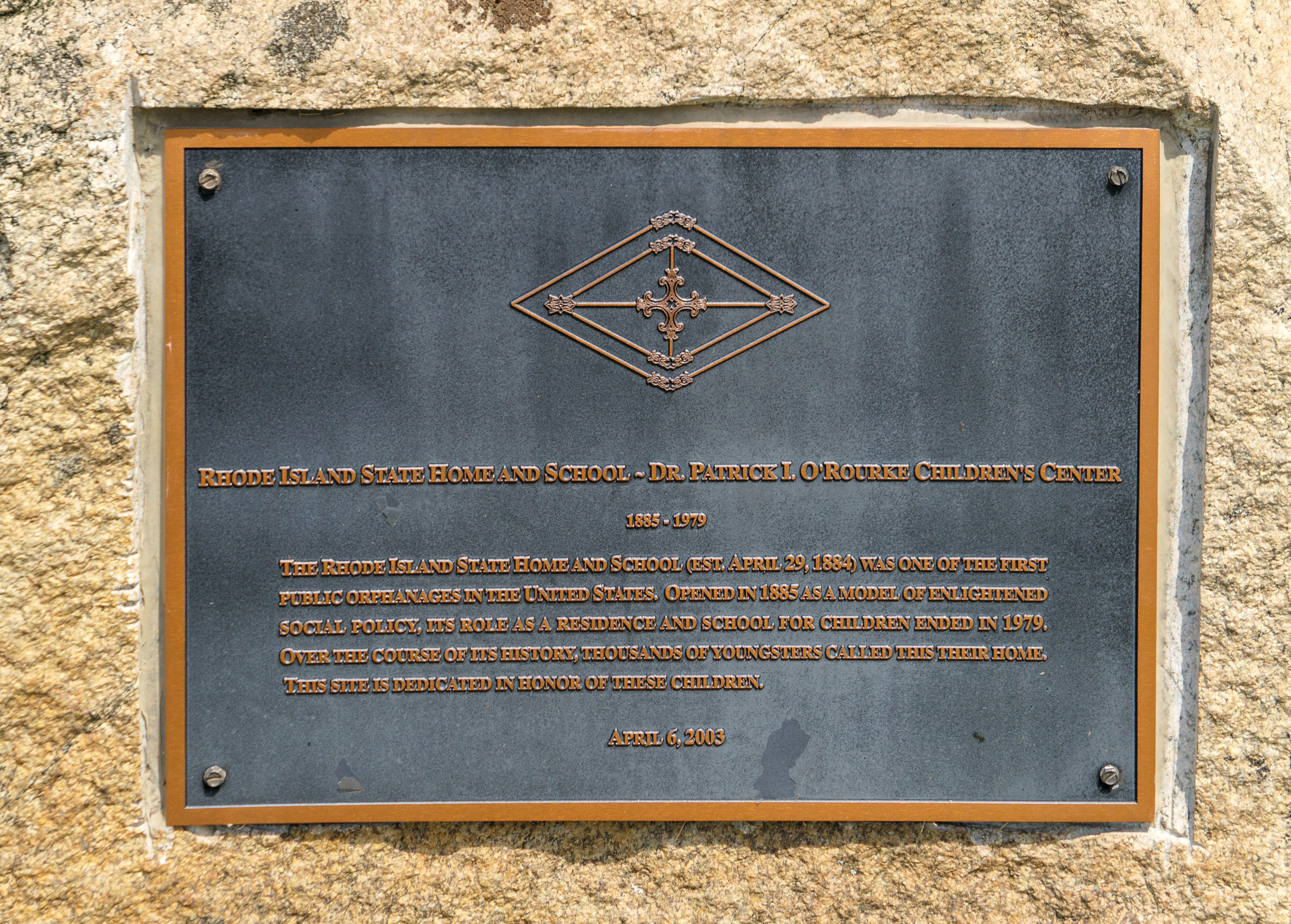
Plaque on the Rhode Island College campus

Prior to the founding of this school, neglected and needy children (either orphans or those whose parents could not care for them) were typically cared for at the local or county level in poor houses. In 1884, the state purchased a 43-acre (17 ha) farm in what was then rural western Providence, which was adapted for use as a school and home. The facility was modeled on the State Public School at Coldwater, Michigan, and was built on the "cottage style" plan, with home-like dormitories and a central administration building. The original stone farmhouse, built in 1870, was adapted for use as the superintendent's residence. The first wards of the State Home were removed from the almshouse and juvenile reformatories at state-run properties in Cranston.

=== The Cottage Plan ===
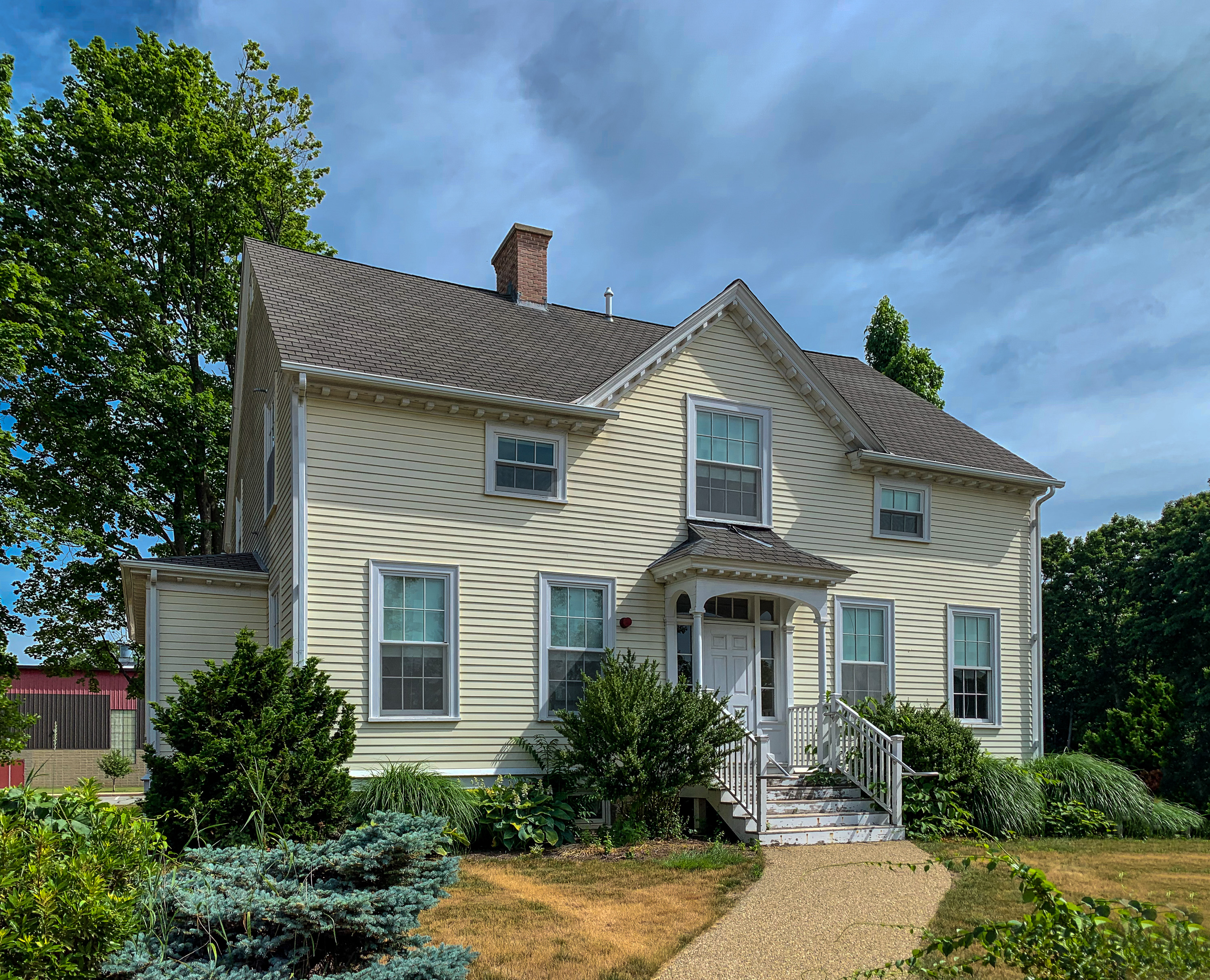
Cottage C, nicknamed the "Yellow Cottage"

The early dormitories were domestic scale wood frame structures, of which only "Cottage C" (nicknamed the "Yellow Cottage") survives today. The school experienced significant growth in its first several decades, necessitating the construction of additional cottages and a schoolhouse. The facility's architecture and landscape were always considered an important element of the care it provided for children. The State Home, later called the Dr. Patrick I. O'Rourke Children's Center, continued to grow and expand into the mid-twentieth century. During the 1950s and 1960s, updated views of the treatment of children prompted the demolition of most of the older cottages in favor of more modern residential facilities, with an emphasis on short-term stays. The original wood cottages were replaced with Modern, red brick dormitories that were also laid out in the cottage plan. By the 1970s, the school's principal function came under attack for extreme overcrowding. The state began emphasizing placement of needy children in foster homes or other specialized state institutions instead.

The facility continued to suffer from management and treatment issues and was finally closed in 1979, with its functions taken over by the state Department of Children, Youth, and Families. Rhode Island College had established its current campus adjacent to the facility in 1958, and began to take over the former school buildings and grounds in the 1990s. The former State Home and Children's Center buildings are now used as college classrooms and offices.

== See also ==
- National Register of Historic Places listings in Providence, Rhode Island
