= Judith Lynn Stillman =

American musician and educator

- Born: Judith Lynn Stillman; New York City, United States
- Origin: Providence, Rhode Island, United States
- Education: Juilliard School (BM, MM, DMA)
- Genres: Classical music
- Occupations: Pianist; Composer; Filmmaker; Music educator
- Instrument: Piano
- Member of: Lancaster Festival Orchestra
- Website: judithlynnstillman.com

Judith Lynn Stillman is an American classical pianist, composer, filmmaker, and music educator. She is the artist-in-residence and a professor of music at Rhode Island College and has performed as a soloist and chamber musician internationally.

== Early life and education ==
Stillman was born in New York City. She began piano lessons at the age of three and was performing publicly by five. At nine, she entered the Juilliard School's pre-college division. She earned Bachelor's, Master's, and Doctor of Musical Arts degrees from Juilliard. During her studies, she won the Juilliard Concerto Competition and the Dethier Prize.

== Career ==
=== Teaching ===
After completing her doctorate, Stillman joined the faculty of Rhode Island College as Artist-in-Residence and a Professor of music. She has received institutional honors including the Maixner Award for Outstanding Teaching, the Thorp Award for Scholarly and Creative Activity, and a faculty award from Alumni and College Relations.

=== Performance ===
Stillman has performed at venues and festivals including Carnegie Hall, Alice Tully Hall, Avery Fisher Hall, Lincoln Center, Marlboro, and Tanglewood, and has toured as a visiting artist in countries such as China, Russia, France, Israel, the United Kingdom, and Canada.

She has collaborated with artists including Jordan Rudess, Sara Sant'Ambrogio, Carol Wincenc, Will Liverman, Wynton Marsalis, Mark O'Connor, Richard Stoltzman, András Schiff, and members of the Borromeo, Muir, and Lydian string quartets. She has also appeared as a guest artist with The Beach Boys.

Stillman is the artistic director and pianist of the chamber music series "Judith Lynn Stillman and Friends from the Rhode Island Philharmonic Orchestra" and serves as the principal keyboardist with the Lancaster Festival Orchestra in Ohio.

In 2024, Stillman served as the on-stage music director and pianist for a production of Amadeus at Rhode Island’s Gamm Theatre.

=== Composition ===
Stillman composes and produces multimedia events that combine music with theatrical and visual elements. Her works include the short opera Essential Business, which won first prize in the international #OperaHarmony competition; Small Step, Giant Leap: A Lunar Fantasy, a multimedia piece for the 50th anniversary of Apollo 11; and song cycles such as Phoenix from the Ashes, based on poetry from the Terezín concentration camp, and When the Music Stopped, commemorating the Armenian Genocide Centennial.

She is also the creator of Play-within-a-Concert, a multidisciplinary live format presenting biographical narratives of composers through music, theatre, and film. Productions include Beethoven: Torment and Triumph, Mozart’s Musical Mystery Tour, April in Paris with Poulenc, and Dvořák: A Bohemian Rhapsody.

=== Film ===
Stillman's film projects have been recognized at numerous festivals. Titles include the opera film Essential Business, honored by Opera Europa; Vanishing Act: A Fantasy on Extinction, which earned awards from the Five Continents and Global Music Awards festivals; and When the Music Stopped, an official selection of the Glendale Film Festival. Other prize-winning films include A Woman’s Place Is in the House, Beneath a Silent Blue Sky, and Women Trailblazers in Music.

== Personal life ==
Stillman resides in Providence, Rhode Island. In 2016, she traveled to refugee camps in Greece to perform for Syrian and Afghan refugees, inspiring her “Refugee Artistry” initiative.

== Discography ==
=== Selected albums ===
- 1993 – On the Twentieth Century with Wynton Marsalis
- 1994 – Christmas Remembered
- 1994 – Classics Remembered
- 1994 – Piano Silhouettes
- 1994 – Seasons Remembered
- 2004 – Chardonnay Classics
- 2004 – Christmas Reflections
- 2013 – Viennese Gems with Richard Stoltzman
- 2017 – Bernstein: Chamber and Concert Music featuring Judith Lynn Stillman, Wynton Marsalis, Yo-Yo Ma, Joshua Bell and Richard Stoltzman

== Awards and honors ==
Stillman has won eighteen international and national piano competitions. In 1997, she received the inaugural Rhode Island Pell Award for Excellence in the Arts. In 2017, she became the first recipient of the Christiana Carteaux Bannister Award for Civil Service in the Arts. In 2019, she was named an Honored Artist by The American Prize for piano and composition, and in 2023, Providence Business News honored her as Creative Services Industry Leader.
