= Roger Picard (politician) =

American politician

Member of the Rhode Island Senate from the 20th district
- Incumbent
- Assumed office January 2009
- Preceded by: Roger Badeau
- Succeeded by: Brian Thompson (elect)

Member of the Rhode Island House of Representatives from the 51st district
- In office January 2003 – January 2009
- Preceded by: Peter Lewiss
- Succeeded by: Christopher M. Fierro

Member of the Rhode Island House of Representatives from the 66th district
- In office January 1993 – January 2003
- Preceded by: Charles Gould
- Succeeded by: Susan Story

Personal details
- Born: January 26, 1957 (age 69) Woonsocket, Rhode Island, U.S.
- Party: Democratic
- Education: University of Rhode Island; Rhode Island College

Roger A. Picard (born January 26, 1957, in Woonsocket, Rhode Island) is an American politician and a Democratic member of the Rhode Island Senate representing District 20 since January 2009. Picard served consecutively in the Rhode Island General Assembly from January 1993 until January 2009 in the Rhode Island House of Representatives District 66 and 51 seats.

On April 9, 2024, he announced that he would not be seeking reelection in 2024.

== Education ==
Picard graduated from the University of Rhode Island and earned his MSW from Rhode Island College.

== Elections ==
- 2012 Picard was unopposed for both the September 11, 2012, Democratic Primary, winning with 1,743 votes, and the November 6, 2012, General election, winning with 7,727 votes.
- 1992 When District 66 Democratic Representative Charles Gould left the Legislature and left the seat open, Picard won the September 15, 1992, Democratic Primary and won the three-way November 3, 1992, General election with 2,589 votes (70.8%) against Republican nominee Joseph Doucette and Independent Sharon Bailey.
- 1994 Picard was challenged in the September 13, 1994, Democratic Primary, but won, and won the November 8, 1994, General election with 1,842 votes (86.7%) against Independent candidate Michael Moniz.
- 1996 Picard was unopposed for the September 10, 1996, Democratic Primary and won the November 5, 1996, General election against Republican nominee Edward Doura.
- 1998 Picard was unopposed for both the September 15, 1998, Democratic Primary, winning with 192 votes and the November 3, 1998, General election, winning with 1,863 votes.
- 2000 Picard was unopposed for both the September 12, 2000, Democratic Primary, winning with 253 votes, and the November 7, 2000, General election, winning with 2,344 votes.
- 2002 Redistricted to District 51, and with incumbent Representative Peter Lewiss redistricted to District 37, Picard faced fellow incumbent Representative Ronald Munschy (who had been redistricted from District 65) in the September 10, 2002, Democratic Primary, winning with 755 votes (67.4%), and was unopposed for the November 5, 2002, General election, winning with 2,778 votes.
- 2004 Picard was unopposed for both the September 14, 2004, Democratic Primary, winning with 160 votes, and the November 2, 2004, General election, winning with 3,368 votes.
- 2006 Picard was unopposed for both the September 12, 2006, Democratic Primary, winning with 549 votes, and the November 7, 2006, General election, winning with 3,309 votes.
- 2008 When District 20 Democratic Senator Roger Badeau retired and left the seat open, Picard was unopposed for both the September 9, 2008, Democratic Primary, winning with 2,072 votes, and the November 4, 2008, General election, winning with 8,657 votes.
- 2010 Picard was challenged in the September 23, 2010, Democratic Primary, winning with 1,722 votes (67.2%) and won the six-way November 2, 2010, General election with 5,026 votes (64.1%) against Republican nominee Stephen Orsini.
