= WXIN (Rhode Island College) =

Radio station at Rhode Island College

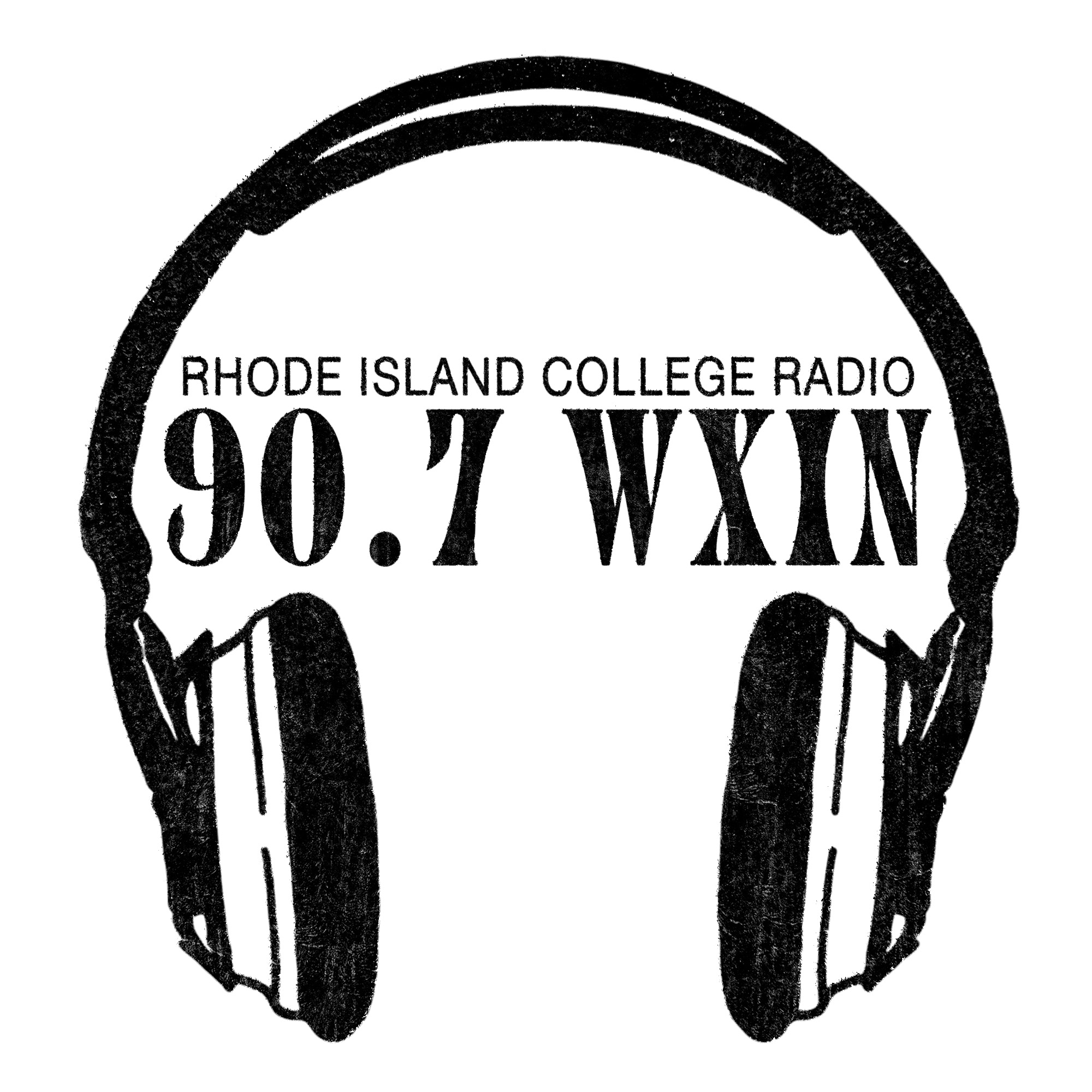
- Logo Design by Meg Tancrede

Providence, Rhode Island; United States
- Frequency: 90.7 MHz (Part 15)
- Branding: 90.7 WXIN

Programming
- Format: College radio

Ownership
- Owner: Rhode Island College

History
- First air date: 1979; 46 years ago

Links
- Webcast: https://www.twitch.tv/RICRadioStudio01
- Website: ricradio.org

"WXIN" (90.7 FM) is the student campus radio broadcast service of Rhode Island College. It operates a part 15 FM transmitter on the property of Rhode Island College, in North Providence, Rhode Island, United States. In addition, WXIN streams its programming on Twitch under RICRadioStudio01. The stream is also picked up and played over speakers at various locations throughout the campus. The station also does podcasting through the name "NIXM" and can be found on Spotify and SoundCloud.

WXIN is a team-oriented organization that strives to create a welcoming and safe space for RIC students as well as visitors who attend their events. The team aims to bring music to the Rhode Island campus through radio shows, live music events, and DJing. As well as supporting local musicians, encouraging creativity, and providing opportunities for our team members to get involved in the local music scene. The organization stays active on Instagram (@ricradio) to encourage community involvement.

== Organization and history ==
WXIN is a student organization, officially recognized by Rhode Island College, and funded by Student Community Government, Inc. The organization has been broadcasting as Rhode Island College's sole radio station consistently since 1979. The station began as a carrier-current station on campus, operating as "WRIC" on 580 AM, and began broadcasting on 88.1 FM and later 90.7 FM in the late 1980s. The student-run organization was named "Organization of the Year" at RIC for a third time in 2011, a fourth time in 2013, and received the honor again for a fifth time in 2023. In October 2015, WXIN was awarded as the "Biggest Champion of the Local Scene" at the College Radio Awards hosted by the College Music Journal. In 2023, WXIN was featured in Motif Magazine article "The Kids Are Alright".

By 2025, WXIN established a reputation in the Providence, Rhode Island music scene, hosting local bands for monthly live shows on campus. Most notably their annual WXINstock music festival in September and their annual battle of the bands, Rock Hunt, in April. During the 2024–2025 academic year, WXIN hosted 11 events, 25 bands, and had 24 student-run radio shows.
