= Roger Badeau =

American politician

Member of the Rhode Island Senate from the 20th district
- In office January 1, 1985 – January 25, 2008
- Succeeded by: Roger Picard

Personal details
- Born: October 30, 1936 Woonsocket, Rhode Island, U.S.
- Died: January 25, 2008 (aged 71) Woonsocket, Rhode Island, U.S.
- Party: Democratic

Roger Badeau (October 30, 1936 – January 25, 2008) was an American politician who served in the Rhode Island Senate from the 20th district from 1985 until his death in 2008.

He died of pancreatic cancer on January 25, 2008, in Woonsocket, Rhode Island at age 71.
